= March 1919 =

Month in 1919

| << | March 1919 | | | | | >> |
| Su | Mo | Tu | We | Th | Fr | Sa |
| | | | | | | 1 |
| 2 | 3 | 4 | 5 | 6 | 7 | 8 |
| 9 | 10 | 11 | 12 | 13 | 14 | 15 |
| 16 | 17 | 18 | 19 | 20 | 21 | 22 |
| 23 | 24 | 25 | 26 | 27 | 28 | 29 |
| 30 | 31 |

The following events occurred in March 1919:

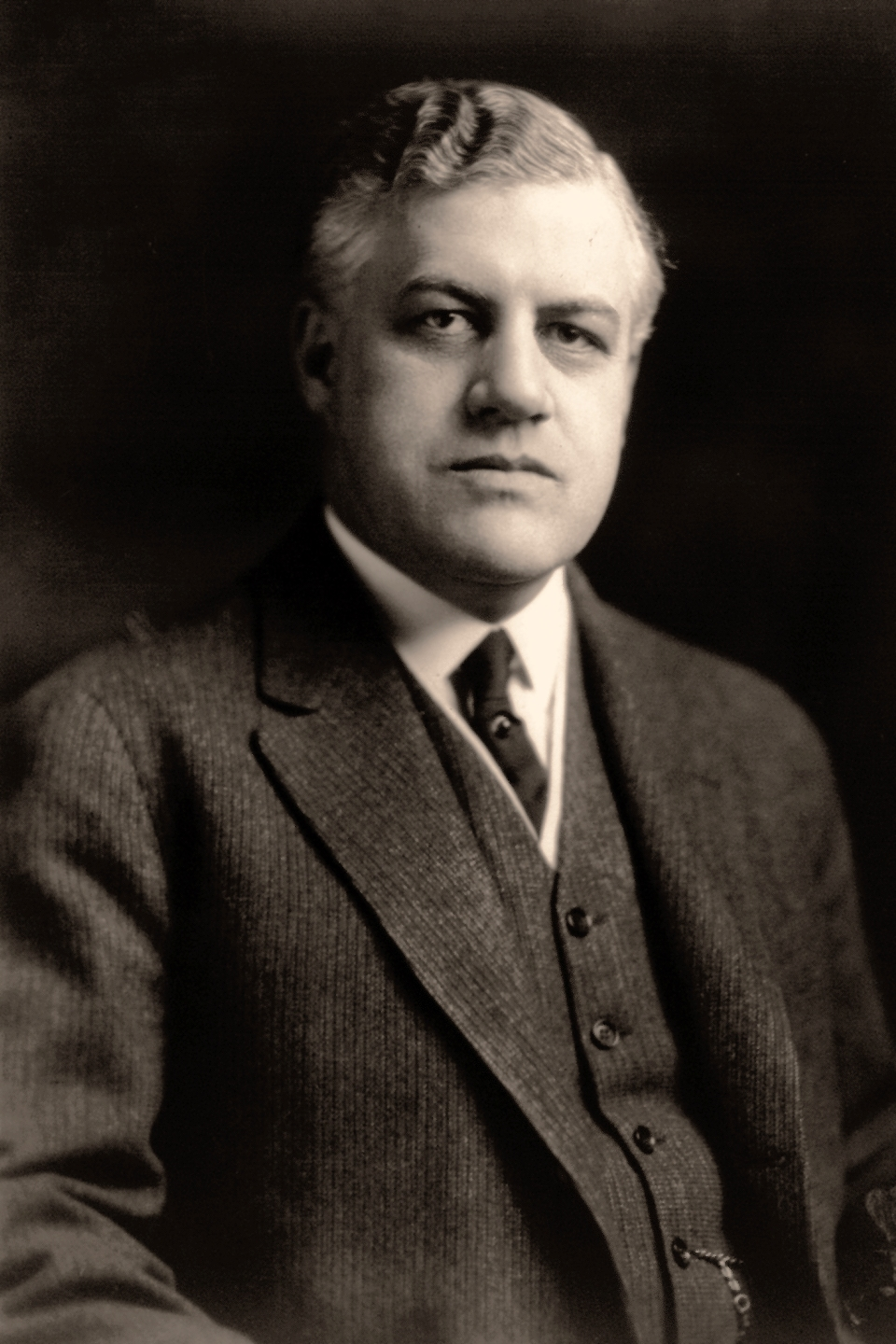
A. Mitchell Palmer, United States Attorney General

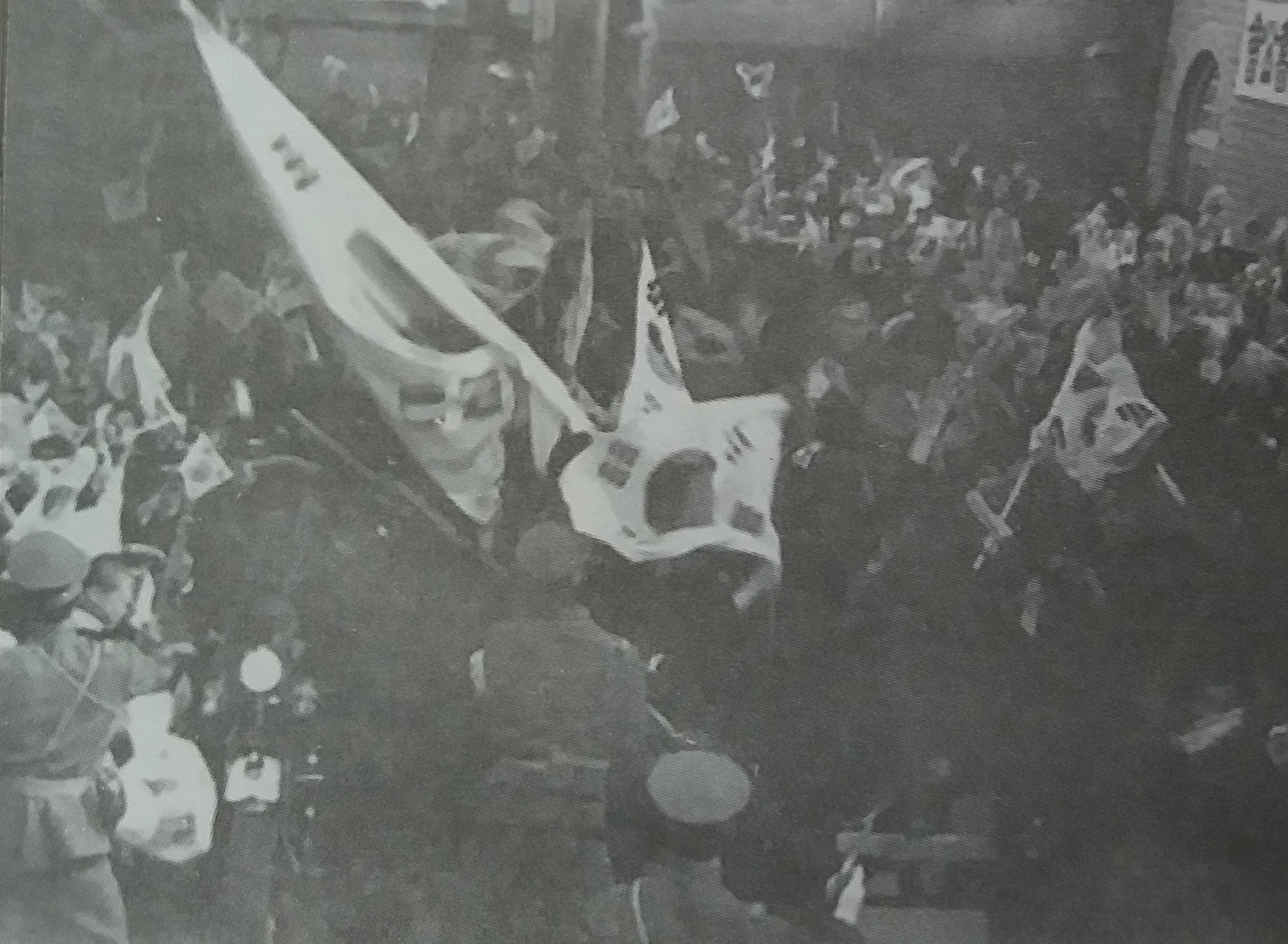
Koreans organize the March 1st Movement in Seoul to protest Japanese rule in Korea.

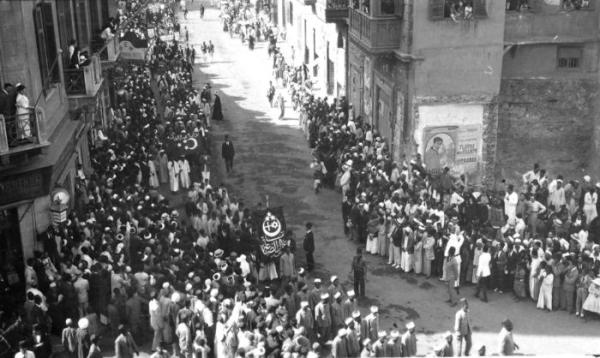
Demonstrators during the Egyptian Revolution.

== March 1, 1919 (Saturday) ==
- The March 1st Movement against Japanese colonial rule in Korea began when 33 activists convened at the Taehwagwan Restaurant in Seoul and read the Korean Declaration of Independence drawn up by historian Choe Nam-seon.
- The West African colonial state French Upper Volta was established using colonial territory from Upper Senegal and Niger and the Côte d'Ivoire. It would be dissolved again in 1932.
- To appease protests across Hungary over the government crackdown on communists, the political offices of the Socialist Party of Hungary were allowed to reopen, its imprisoned leaders could receive visitors, and its official newspaper Vörös Újság (Red News) could resume publication.
- The Temporary National Representation convened as the first parliamentary body in the Kingdom of Yugoslavia.
- The No. 80 Wing of the Royal Air Force was disbanded.
- The German airline DLR began scheduled flights to Hamburg.
- Auto and aircraft parts manufacturer Jihostroj was established in Velešín, Czechoslovakia.
- The Chūō rail line was extended in the Tokyo area, with stations such as Kanda serving the line.
- Several rail stations were reopened in Great Britain after being closed down during World War I, including stations Lugton, Scotland, and in Burnham and Folkestone in England, and Crystal Palace and Lordship Lane in London.
- The first issue of the American pulp magazine The Thrill Book was released featuring stories of fantasy or science fiction.
- The borough of Trainer, Pennsylvania was incorporated.
- Born:
  - Reg Sprigg, Australian geologist, known for his research in the Precambrian period; in Yorketown, Australia (d. 1994)
  - Ernest Radcliffe Bond, British law enforcer, commander of the Bomb Squad with the Metropolitan Police in London; in Barrow-in-Furness, England (d. 2003)
  - Alberto A. Nido, Puerto Rican air force officer, co-founder of the Puerto Rico Air National Guard, recipient of the Distinguished Flying Cross and Air Medal; in Arroyo, Puerto Rico (d. 1991)
  - João Goulart, Brazilian state leader, 24th President of Brazil; in São Borja, Rio Grande do Sul, Brazil (d. 1976)

== March 2, 1919 (Sunday) ==
- The Founding Congress of the Comintern opened in Moscow with over 50 representatives from two dozen countries. The assembly led to the establishment of the Communist International.
- About 55% of voters in Liechtenstein rejected lowering the voting age from 24 to 21 and increasing the number of seats in the Landtag during a referendum.
- The Russian government established the Institute of Economics and Finance, now known as the Financial University in Moscow.
- American publisher Claude Albert Barnett established the Associated Negro Press in Chicago as a news service for African American issues.
- Several rail stations were reopened in Great Britain after being closed down during World War I, including stations in Kelvinside in Scotland and Abbeytown in England.
- Born:
  - Jennifer Jones, American actress, known for roles in Duel in the Sun, Love Is a Many-Splendored Thing, and The Towering Inferno, recipient of the Academy Award for Best Actress for The Song of Bernadette; as Phylis Lee Isley, in Tulsa, Oklahoma, United States (d. 2009)
  - Tamara Toumanova, Russian-born Georgian American ballet dancer, known for her collaborations with the Original Ballet Russe and New York City Ballet; in Tyumen, Russian SFSR (present-day Russia) (d. 1996)
- Died:
  - Wellington R. Burt, 87, American industrialist, developer of the lumber industry in Saginaw, Michigan (b. 1831)
  - William "Honey" Mellody, 35, American boxer, World Welterweight Champion from 1906 to 1907; died of pneumonia (b. 1884)

== March 3, 1919 (Monday) ==
- Finland held the first elections since the Finnish Civil War, with voter turnout at 67 percent. The Social Democratic Party of Finland won the majority of the seats in the Parliament of Finland.
- Amanullah Khan, Emir of Afghanistan, had his brother Nasrullah Khan arrested.
- Austrian president Karl Renner dissolved his government for the Republic of German-Austria to make way for the new Constitutional Assembly elected in February.
- The first U.S. international airmail was carried between Vancouver, British Columbia and Seattle, Washington by William E. Boeing in a Boeing Model 2 airplane.
- The Supreme Court of the United States upheld the conviction of Charles Schenck, a member of the American Socialist Party, for violation of the Espionage Act when he oversaw the distribution of 15,000 fliers to men of voting age that encouraged them to refuse the draft for World War I. The phrase "shouting fire in a crowded theater" became popular in reference to a passage in the court's decision that stated reasons why Schenk's actions were not protected under the First Amendment, particularly during wartime: "The most stringent protection of free speech would not protect a man in falsely shouting fire in a theatre and causing a panic."
- English composer T. Tertius Noble established the Saint Thomas Choir School in New York City.
- A rail station was opened at Billingstad, Norway to serve the Drammen Line.
- Several rail stations were reopened in England after being closed down during World War I, including stations in Stourbridge and south London.
- Born: Peter Abrahams, South African-born Jamaican writer, known for his novels Mine Boy and A Wreath for Udomo; as Peter Henry Abrahams Deras, in Vrededorp, Gauteng, Union of South Africa (present-day South Africa) (d. 2017, murdered)
- Died:
  - Hari Narayan Apte, 54, Indian writer, founder of the literary magazine Karamanuk (b. 1864)
  - James Withycombe, 64, American politician, 15th Governor of Oregon (b. 1854)

== March 4, 1919 (Tuesday) ==
- White Army spring offensive – The Siberian Army under the Russian Whites launched renewed attacks against the Red Army on the Eastern Front of the Russian Civil War.
- The 66th United States Congress began sitting in Washington, D.C.
- Soldiers with the Canadian Expeditionary Force awaiting repatriation at Kinmel Camp, Bodelwyddan, Wales mutinied. The violence resulted in five deaths and 28 injuries. A total 25 Canadian soldiers were convicted of mutiny.
- The LETA, the main news agency in Latvia, was established in Riga.
- The film drama The Red Lantern, directed by Albert Capellani, was released through Metro Pictures with Alla Nazimova in dual roles. It was also the screen debut for Chinese-American actress Anna May Wong.
- The Slangkop Lighthouse, standing 33 metres high, was inaugurated at Kommetjie, South Africa.
- Born:
  - Buck Baker, American racing driver, two-time winner of the NASCAR Sprint Cup Series; as Elzie Wylie Baker, in Richburg, South Carolina, United States (d. 2002)
  - Tan Chee Khoon, Malaysian politician, Leader of the Opposition from 1964 to 1978; in Chera, British Malaya (present-day Malaysia) (d. 1996)

== March 5, 1919 (Wednesday) ==
- U.S. President Woodrow Wilson appointed A. Mitchell Palmer as United States Attorney General.
- The new central railway station, designed by Eliel Saarinen, opened in Helsinki.
- Died:
  - Ernest von Koerber, 68, Austrian state leader, 18th and 25th Prime Minister of Austria (b. 1850)
  - Frances Anne Hopkins, 81, British painter, best known for her historic paintings of the fur trade in Canada including Shooting the Rapids, Canoe Manned by Voyageurs Passing a Waterfall and Voyageurs at Dawn (b. 1838)

== March 6, 1919 (Thursday) ==
- White Army spring offensive – The Western Army of the White Movement fought the Second and Fifth Red Armies near Simbirsk and Samara, Russia.
- The Reichswehr was established as Germany's new armed forces, with President Friedrich Ebert as commander-in-chief. The force had two branches, with the Reichswehr to be composed of 100,000 soldiers for land defense and the Reichsmarine of 15,000 sailors for all sea defense.
- Women voted for the first time in Michigan following the passing of a state law in November 1918. The first Michigan woman to exercise the vote was Rosa John, the wife of a prominent Syrian merchant.
- The Montreal Canadiens defeated the Ottawa Senators in a best-of-seven series to win the National Hockey League championship.
- Died:
  - George Eyser, 48, German-American gymnast, three-time gold and two-time silver medalist at the 1904 Summer Olympics, first known American Olympic athlete to compete with a prosthetic; committed suicide (b. 1870)
  - Hilary A. Herbert, 84, American politician, 33rd United States Secretary of the Navy (b. 1834)

== March 7, 1919 (Friday) ==
- A new coalition government was formed to lead the People's State of Bavaria, with Johannes Hoffmann as head of state.
- Hungarian composer Jenő Huszka premiered his opera Baroness Lili at the Erkel Theatre in Budapest.
- Born: M. N. Nambiar, Indian film actor, known for his roles in Tamil movies including Market of Illusions, The Sacred Dwelling and The Dance Queen Mohanambal; as Manjeri Narayanan Nambiar, in Cannanor, British India (present-day Kannur, India) (d. 2008)

== March 8, 1919 (Saturday) ==
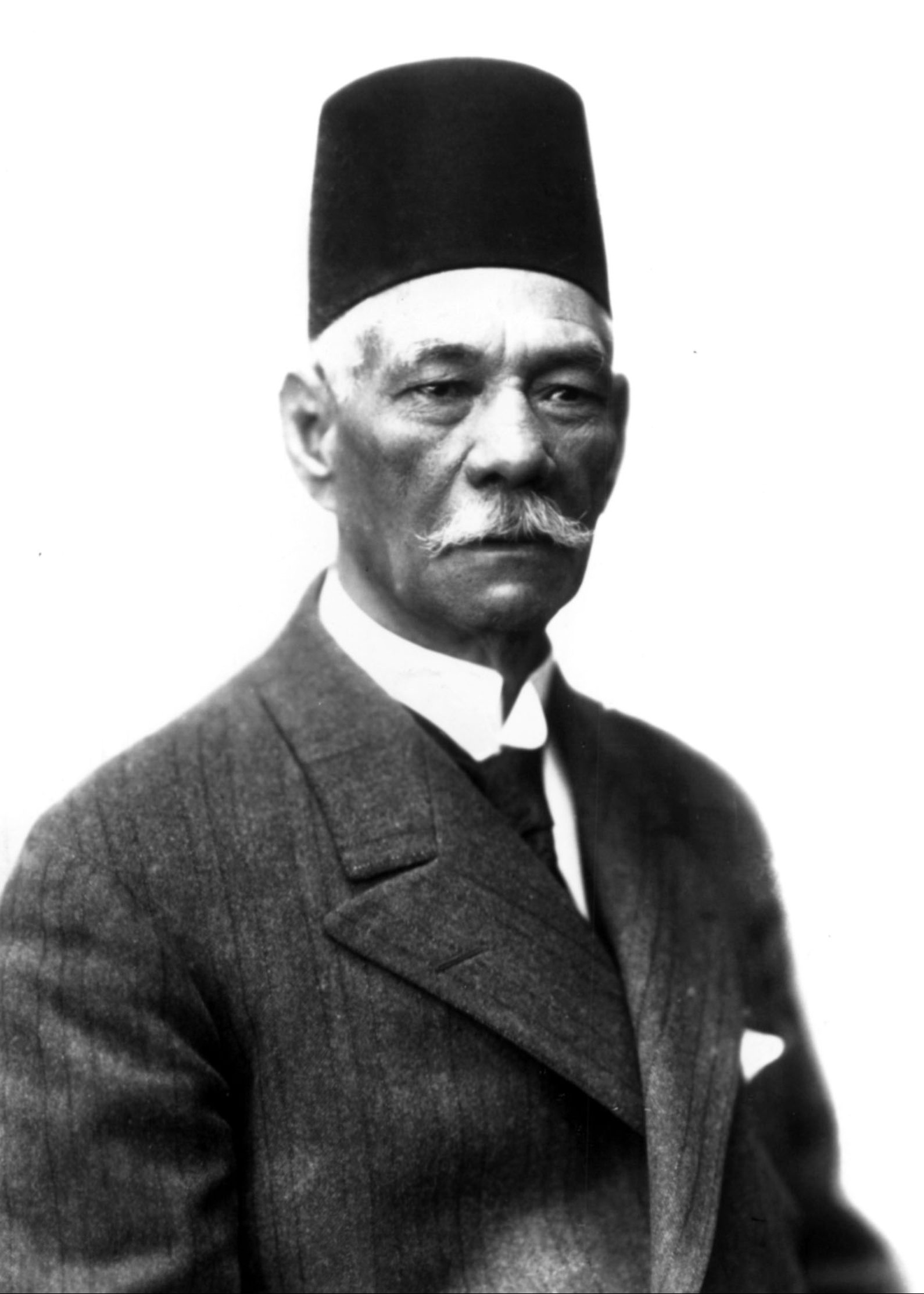
Saad Zaghloul

- White Army spring offensive – The Siberian Army captured the towns of Okhansk and Osa before advancing on the Kama River.
- Egyptian Revolution – British authorities arrested Egyptian politician Saad Zaghloul, leader of the popular nationalistic Wafd Party, for promoting grassroots civil disobedience in Egypt and exiled him and other party leaders to Malta.
- The Rowlatt Act was passed by the Imperial Legislative Council in London, indefinitely extending the emergency provisions of the Defence of India Act.
- The War School of Kaunas was established in Kaunas, Lithuania to train needed junior officers for the Lithuanian Army during the Lithuanian Wars of Independence.
- The Christmas Bullet biplane, named after designer William Whitney Christmas, was released to the public at Madison Square Garden in New York City. However, many of first prototypes crashed due to its unusual wing design.
- Born: Bob Homme, American-Canadian actor, best known for the title role in the CBC Television children's program The Friendly Giant, recipient of the Order of Canada; in Stoughton, Wisconsin, United States (d. 2000)
- Died: Gavino Gutierrez, 69, Spanish-American architect, designer of Ybor City, Florida (b. 1849)

== March 9, 1919 (Sunday) ==
- Italy passed a new law which eliminated husbands' superiority in family law. This gave women the right to control their own property, have equal guardianship of their children, stand for public office and enter professions.
- Málaga Airport was established at Málaga, and has become the fourth busiest airport in Spain.
- Born:
  - Frank King, British army officer, commander of Northern Ireland during "The Troubles" in the early 1970s, commander of the British Army of the Rhine and Northern Army Group during the Cold War, recipient of the Order of the Bath and Order of the British Empire; in Brightwell-cum-Sotwell, England (d. 1998)
  - Ralph Miller, American basketball coach, managed the Wichita State Shockers men's basketball team, Iowa Hawkeyes men's basketball team, and Oregon State Beavers men's basketball team from 1951 to 1989; in Chanute, Kansas, United States (d. 2001)

== March 10, 1919 (Monday) ==
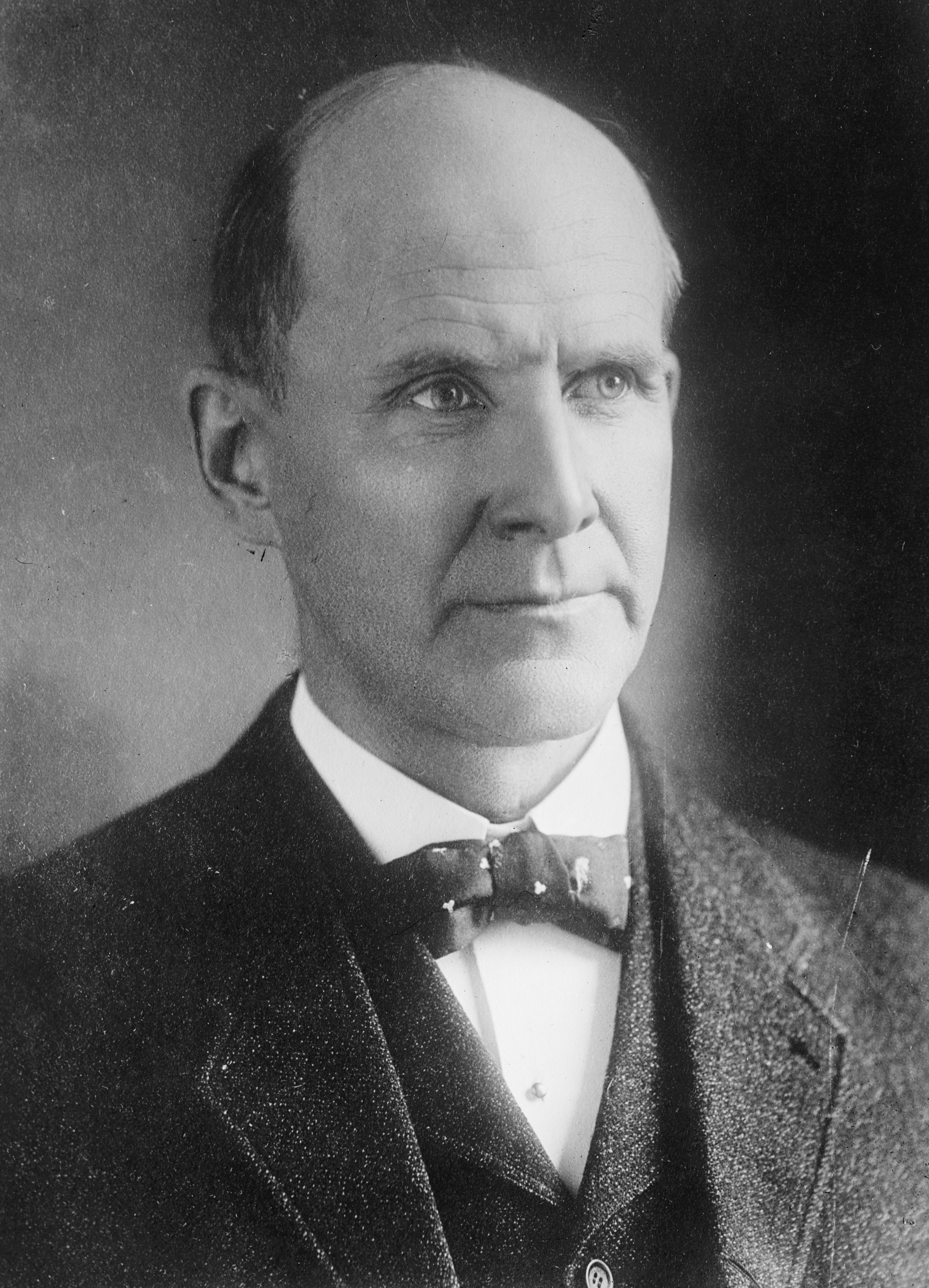
Eugene V. Debs

- White Army spring offensive – The Western Army of the White Movement defeated the Fifth Red Army and forced them to retreat to Simbirsk and Samara, Russia.
- The Ukrainian Soviet Socialist Republic was established, completed with its own flag, but White Russian forces threatened to overthrow it almost immediately.
- Women were given the right to vote in Ukraine.
- Australian Prime Minister Billy Hughes announced a £10,000 reward to the first aviator who could fly from the United Kingdom to Australia in less than 30 days.
- The Supreme Court of the United States upheld the conviction of labor leader Eugene V. Debs under the Espionage Act for making an antiwar speech in Canton, Ohio in 1917.
- Axeman of New Orleans – After months of inactivity, a new string of home break-ins and attacks on inhabitants with an ax commenced in New Orleans, starting with Italian immigrant Charles Cortimiglia and his wife while they were sleeping with their two-year-old daughter. The couple survived the attack despite being badly injured, but their daughter was killed.
- Elections were held to fill one of the seats on the Hong Kong Sanitary Board, with incumbent F. M. G. Ozorio retaining his seat.
- The 148th Aero Squadron the United States Army Air Service was disbanded at Mitchell Field, New York.
- Football Club 3 de Febrero was established in Asunción, Paraguay.
- Born:
  - Marion Hutton, American singer, lead female vocalist for the Glenn Miller Orchestra, sister to Betty Hutton; as Marion Thornburg, in Fort Smith, Arkansas, United States (d. 1987)
  - John Plagis, Rhodesian air force officer, commander of the No. 64 and No. 126 Squadrons during World War II, recipient of the Distinguished Service Order, Distinguished Flying Cross, and Airman's Cross; as Ioannis Agorastos Plagis, in Gadzema, Southern Rhodesia (present-day Zimbabwe) (d. 1974)
  - Bulldog Turner, American football player, center for the Chicago Bears from 1940 to 1952; as Clyde Douglas Turner, in Plains, Texas, United States (d. 1998)
- Died: Leo Jogiches, Russian-German revolutionary leader, founder of the Social Democracy of the Kingdom of Poland and Lithuania and member of the Spartacus League in Germany; assassinated (b. 1867)

== March 11, 1919 (Tuesday) ==
- Cossacks in Vyoshenskaya, Russia began rebelling against the Bolsheviks after the execution of 300 Cossack soldiers who refused to surrender their arms to the Red Army. The rebellion helped the Russian White Army capture much of the region along the Don River.
- The Saku Railway opened the Koumi Line in Yamanashi Prefecture, Japan, with stations Koumi, Managashi, Takaiwa, Sakuhozumi, and Kaize serving the line.

== March 12, 1919 (Wednesday) ==
- The Lithuanian Army formed an aviation unit, the precursor to the Lithuanian Air Force.
- The 173rd Infantry Brigade of the British Army was disbanded.
- The Order of St. Augustine established the La Consolacion College in Bacolod, Philippines.
- American composer Joseph Carl Breil premiered his tragic opera The Legend at the Metropolitan Opera in New York City, however scathing reviews forced it to close after three performances.

== March 13, 1919 (Thursday) ==
- Axeman of New Orleans – Three days after the attack on Charles Cortimiglia and his family, a letter was distributed to newspapers through New Orleans purportedly by the person responsible for the home invasions starting in 1918. The letter opened with: "They have never caught me and they never will ... I am what you Orleanians and your foolish police call the Axeman." After several more boasts, the letter concluded that if jazz music was played in homes after midnight on the following Tuesday, he would spare the inhabitants.
- Italian bank Cassa Rurale di Depositi e Prestiti di Pompiano was founded in Pompiano, Italy. It merged with other banks over the next century to become the Banca del Territorio Lombardo cooperative.
- Born: Irina Baronova, Russian ballet dancer, one of the noted Baby Ballerinas for the Original Ballet Russe; in Petrograd, Russian SFSR (present-day Saint Petersburg, Russia) (d. 2008)

== March 14, 1919 (Friday) ==
- The Seattle Metropolitans defeated the Vancouver Millionaires in a two-game playoff to win the PCHA title, advancing them to play against the Montreal Canadiens in the Stanley Cup Final.
- The Ukrainian Socialist Soviet Republic adopted its emblem which included the iconic hammer and sickle design adopted by Russia.
- Died: Roger Atkinson Pryor, 90, American politician, member of the Confederate States Congress for Virginia during the American Civil War (b. 1828)

== March 15, 1919 (Saturday) ==
- Egyptian Revolution – Widespread disturbances erupted throughout Egypt over the arrest of the leaders of the Wafd Party, with reports of villages being burned down, large land properties plundered and major rail stations destroyed over the next 15 days.
- About 2,000 members of the American Expeditionary Forces convened in Paris for the first American Legion caucus to form "one permanent nation-wide organization...composed of all parties, all creeds, and all ranks who wish to perpetuate the relationships formed while in military service."
- The United States Navy dissolved the 2nd Naval District and incorporated it into the 1st and 3rd naval districts.
- The Massachusetts Bay Transportation Authority extended the Orange Line in Boston with the Charlestown Elevated rail, and served by the Everett station.
- Born:
  - George Avakian, Russian-born Armenian-American music producer, prolific producer of hit jazz albums for Columbia Records, Warner Records, and RCA Records; as Kevork Mesrop Avakian, in Armavir, Russian SFSR (present-day Russia) (d. 2017)
  - Lawrence Tierney, American actor, known for his tough guy performances including John Dillinger in Dillinger, Born to Kill, The Devil Thumbs a Ride, and Reservoir Dogs; in New York City, United States (d. 2002)

== March 16, 1919 (Sunday) ==
- White Army spring offensive – The Western Army of the White Movement captured Ufa, Russia from the Fifth Red Army.
- The military arm of Cheka, the secret police organization for Soviet Russia, was reorganized into the Troops for the Internal Defense of the Republic. The group policed labor camps, ran the Gulag system and put down rebellions wherever they occurred. By 1921, the organization had 200,000 men.
- The Soviet authorities conducted a census of Kyiv with the goal of finding out the status of various demographic indicators of the city.
- The first surface extension of the IND Culver Line opened in New York City from Ninth Avenue to Kings Highway, and included stations 13th Avenue, 18th Avenue, Avenue I, Avenue N, Avenue P, Bay Parkway, Ditmas Avenue, and Fort Hamilton Parkway.
- Died: Yakov Sverdlov, 33, Russian politician, Bolshevik party administration and chairman of the All-Russian Central Executive Committee (b. 1885)

== March 17, 1919 (Monday) ==
- The Philippine Legislature passed a "Declaration of Purposes" stating an "inflexible desire" for a free and sovereign Philippines.
- The Federal Council of Switzerland agreed to put the question of women's suffrage on the ballot to be decided by voters.
- Battle of Bolshie Ozerki – A Red Army brigade of 600 to 800 men overwhelmed a small Allied garrison at the village of Bolshie Ozerki near the port of Onega, Russia, capturing 60 to 80 French and White Russian troops.
- The 13th, 67th, 68th, and 69th Infantry Divisions of the British Army were disbanded, including the 201st, 202nd, and 214th Brigades.
- The Oklahoma Senate established the Miami School of Mines in Miami, Oklahoma, initially for students pursuing careers in the mining industry. The school became a junior college to broaden its curriculum and eventually became Northeastern Oklahoma A&M College.
- The Penang Chinese Girls' High School was established in George Town, Penang, Malaysia.
- The Shimotsuke Tramway was extended in the Tochigi Prefecture, Japan, with stations Shimo-Taki serving the line.
- Football club Náutico Marcílio Dias was established in Itajaí, Brazil.
- Powder River County, Montana was established with its county seat in Broadus.
- Born: Nat King Cole, American singer, best known for his hits "Unforgettable", "Mona Lisa", "The Christmas Song", "Ramblin' Rose", and "When I Fall in Love"; as Nathaniel Adams Coles, in Montgomery, Alabama, United States (d. 1965)
- Died:
  - Kenyon Cox, 62, American artist, noted instructor of the Art Students League of New York and National Academy of Design; died of pneumonia (b. 1856)
  - Constance Crawley, 48, English actress, known for her collaborations with Ben Greet and husband John Sayer Crawley (b. 1870)
  - James Dalton, 84-85, Irish-Australian agriculture baron, developed the food distribution system for the Colony of New South Wales, Australia (b. 1834)

== March 18, 1919 (Tuesday) ==
- The 8th Congress of the Russian Communist Party was held in Moscow with over 300 delegates representing over 313,000 party members in attendance.
- The 13th Australian Battalion was disbanded after the last members returned to Australia.
- The 37th and 95th Aero Squadrons of the United States Army Air Service were disbanded.
- DeMolay, an international fraternal organization for male adolescents, was established in Kansas City, Missouri.
- Football club Valencia was established in Valencia, Spain.
- Born:
  - G. E. M. Anscombe, Irish philosopher, leading promoter of analytic philosophy; as Gertrude Elizabeth Margaret Anscombe, in Limerick, Ireland (d. 2001)
  - Isaac Woodard, American soldier and activist, his attack while still in army uniform in 1946 resulted in blindness that led to U.S. President Harry S. Truman releasing a bill to desegregate the United States Armed Forces; in Fairfield County, South Carolina, United States (d. 1992)
- Died: James Taylor Ellyson, 71, American politician, 20th Lieutenant Governor of Virginia (b. 1847)

== March 19, 1919 (Wednesday) ==
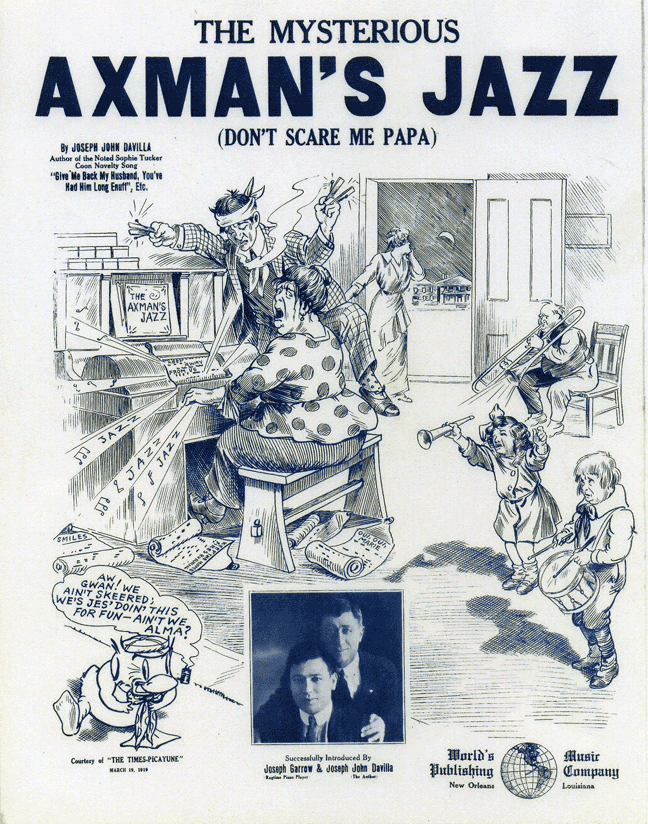
Cover of sheet music popularizing the March 19 evening when New Orleans homes played jazz at midnight to prevent a potential attack from the Axeman of New Orleans.

- Axeman of New Orleans – Motivated by press coverage of a mysterious letter sent to newspapers from the purported ax murderer promising those who were not playing jazz music on March 19 "will get the axe", dance halls in New Orleans were filled to capacity and hundreds of professional and amateur jazz musicians were hired to play at private parties in residential homes as a way to protect from attacks. No murders occurred that night.
- The Division of Military Aeronautics was absorbed into the United States Army Air Service.
- The Russian Soviet Government Bureau was established in New York City as a trade and information agency between Soviet Russia and the United States since the two countries did not have formal diplomatic relations. However, the agency roused anti-communist suspicions and was raided within months of the operations before closing in 1921.
- The 106th Infantry Regiment of the United States Army was disbanded.
- The 21st Rifle Division of the Red Army was established for fighting on the Eastern Front of the Russian Civil War.
- Surrealism figures André Breton, Philippe Soupault, and Louis Aragon founded the literary magazine Littérature, but it did not find the desired audience and folded in five years.
- The Bolivian daily newspaper La Patria began publication in Oruro, Bolivia.
- Football club Erlenbach was established in Erlenbach am Main, Germany.
- Born:
  - Hubert Raymond Allen, British air force officer, commander of the No. 66 Squadron during World War II and No. 43 Squadron during the post-war, recipient of the Distinguished Flying Cross and Order of Orange-Nassau (d. 1987)
  - Arthur Cronquist, American biologist, developer of the Cronquist system for classifying flowering plants; in San Jose, California, United States (d. 1992)
  - Lennie Tristano, American jazz musician, known for mentoring jazz saxophonists Lee Konitz and Warne Marsh; as Leonard Joseph Tristano, in Chicago, United States (d. 1978)
  - Patricia Laffan, English actress, known for film roles including Quo Vadis and Devil Girl from Mars; in Streatham, London, England (d. 2014)
  - D. K. Pattammal, Indian singer, leading promoter of carnatic music in the Tamil language; as Damal Krishnaswamy Pattammal, in Kanchipuram, Madras, British India (present-day India) (d. 2009)

== March 20, 1919 (Thursday) ==
- The administration under Dénes Berinkey resigned as the government of Hungary, after refusing to comply with a request from France to pull Hungarian troops out of Transylvania for Romanian occupation.
- The 18th Infantry Division and 25th Infantry Brigade of the British Army were disbanded.
- The Protestant Hospital opened in Nashville, Tennessee to better respond to the demand of caring for Spanish flu patients.
- The St. Patrick Church in Imogene, Iowa was completed. It was listed on the National Register of Historic Places in 1983.
- Born:
  - Gerhard Barkhorn, German air force officer, commander of Jagdbombergeschwader 31 for the Luftwaffe during World War II, recipient of the Knight's Cross of the Iron Cross, second highest German war ace with 300 kills; in Königsberg, Free State of Prussia, Weimar Republic (present-day Kaliningrad, Russia) (d. 1983)
  - Peter Conder, British biologist, noted director for the Royal Society for the Protection of Birds; in Streatham, London, England (d. 1993)
- Died:
  - Edward Charles Stirling, 70, Australian anthropologist, first professor of physiology at the University of Adelaide; died of bronchitis (b. 1848)
  - Pauline Markham, 71, English actress, best known for her collaborations with Niblo's Garden in New York City (b. 1847)

== March 21, 1919 (Friday) ==
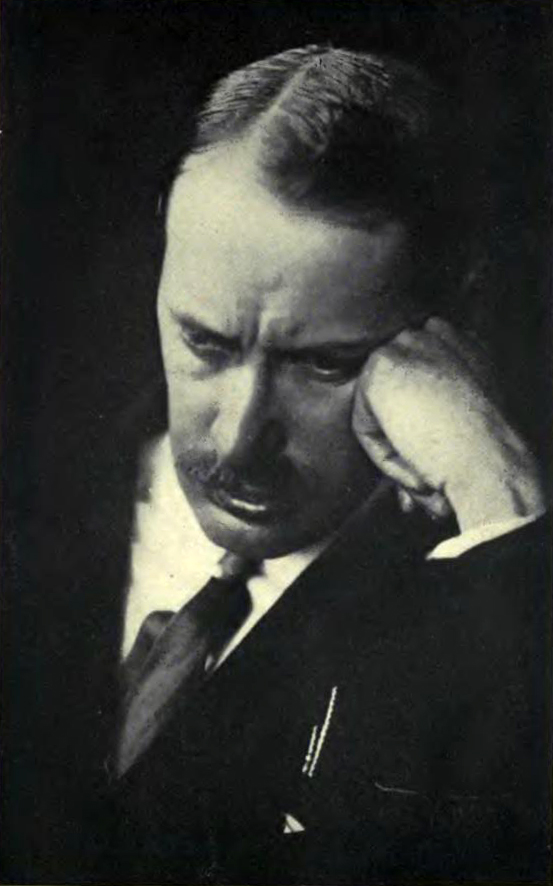
Mihály Károlyi

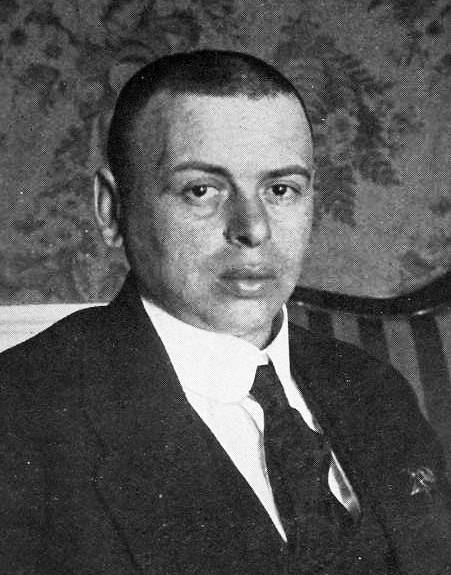
Béla Kun

- During what was supposed to be an official transition of the executive in Hungary, president Mihály Károlyi unknowingly allowed Hungarian soviets led by Béla Kun to seize power. The Social Democratic Party of Hungary that Károlyi favored in fact had secretly negotiated to merge with the Socialist Party of Hungary that was backed by Russian soviets. Faced with a coup d'état, Károlyi resigned as president and was replaced by a government under Sándor Garbai. However, as Foreign Affairs commissar, Kun held the real power behind the scene as he had direct support from Vladimir Lenin in Moscow.
- The Republic of Baden unanimously passed a new constitution.
- Nikolay Chkheidze was elected president of the Democratic Republic of Georgia.
- Universal suffrage was extended to women in Hungary, provided they were trade union members. It was overturned when the soviet republic dissolved in August and would not be reinstated until 1945.
- The Jones Library was established in Amherst, Massachusetts.
- Chong Hwa Independent High School, one of the oldest in Malaysia, was established in Kuala Lumpur.
- Singaporean businessman Tan Kah Kee established The Chinese High School in Singapore, the first secondary school in Southeast Asia for overseas Chinese students. The school merged with Hwa Chong Junior College to become the Hwa Chong Institution.
- Football and sports clubs were established in the following cities: Queen of the South in Dumfries, Scotland, Itala San Marco Gradisca in Gradisca d'Isonzo, Italy, and sports club Åsa in Åsa, Kungsbacka, Sweden, with programs in football, bandy, and gymnastics.
- Born: R. M. Hare, English philosopher, developed universal prescriptivism and preference utilitarianism; as Richard Mervyn Hare, in Backwell, England (d. 2002)

== March 22, 1919 (Saturday) ==
- The first regular international commercial air route opened between Paris and Brussels, flown by an Goliath airplane built by Farman Aviation Works.
- The University of Toronto Schools won the first Memorial Cup by defeating the Regina Pats 29–8 in a two-game aggregate at the Arena Gardens in Toronto.
- The Committee of 48 released through four liberal publications a call for new organization on creating a new political party committed to social reform.
- British author Arthur Mee published the first issue of The Children's Newspaper. It merged with children's weekly magazine Look and Learn in 1965.
- Born:
  - Isidora Aguirre, Chilean playwright, known for theatrical dramas including La pérgola de las flores, recipient of the Pablo Neruda Order of Artistic and Cultural Merit; as Isidora Aguirre Tupper, in Santiago, Chile (d. 2011)
  - Matthew Feldman, American politician, member of the New Jersey Senate from 1966 to 1994; in Jersey City, New Jersey, United States (d. 1994)
- Died: Prenk Bib Doda, Albanian noble, member of the Young Turks, one of the leaders of the Peasant Revolt in Albania, cabinet minister for Turhan Pasha Përmeti; assassinated (b. 1860)

== March 23, 1919 (Sunday) ==
- Vladimir Lenin issued an order to Hungarian foreign affairs commissar Béla Kun to purge members of the Social Democratic Party of Hungary so a "dictatorship of the proletariat" would be governing Hungary.
- Benito Mussolini organized a rally at Piazza San Sepolcro in Milan where he proclaimed the principles of Fasci Italiani di Combattimento, giving birth to Italian fascism.
- Battle of Bolshie Ozerki – An Allied force of around 400 British, 300 White Russian and 70 American troops launched two coordinated attacks against Bolshie Ozerki, Russia but failed to recapture the village and lost 75 men.
- The 8th Russian Congress elected its 8th Central Committee.
- The Bashkir Revolutionary Committee, which was then located in the village Temyasovo (Ufa was occupied by white troops) formally became the first autonomous soviet republic in the Russian Soviet Federative Socialist Republic.
- The Australian First Division was disbanded.
- Belgian cyclist Henri Vanlerberghe won the first Tour of Flanders cycling race held since the end of World War I.
- The first Dominion supermarket opened in Toronto, and expanded to over 60 stores within two years.
- The National Restaurant Association held its inaugural meeting in Kansas City, Missouri, with the organization representing 43,000 restaurants across the United States.
- Regional governing body Skånes Fotbollförbund was established within the Swedish Football Association.

== March 24, 1919 (Monday) ==
- Charles, last Emperor of Austria, left the country for exile in Switzerland while issuing a public proclamation maintaining that he was still the sovereign of Austria.
- The Hungarian Soviet Republic began a campaign of purging members of the Social Democratic Party of Hungary from government through arrests and imprisonment, including former Hungarian president Mihály Károlyi (who would not escape to Paris until July). The soviet republic was unpopular among most of the population, particularly the peasantry. To maintain control, an enforcement group nicknamed the Lenin Boys was created, and was linked to nearly 600 murders over the next few months.
- Red Flag riots – A crowd of 8,000 ex-servicemen clashed with police in Brisbane. Police officers used bayonets to drive back the mob, injuring 100 servicemen.
- The 66th Infantry Division of the British Army was disbanded.
- The 57th, 58th, and 59th Australian Battalions were disbanded.
- A contingent of Women's Royal Air Force (WRAF) personnel arrived in France for overseas service, the first time that WRAF personnel served outside the United Kingdom. Later in the year, another WRAF contingent would be sent to Germany.
- The Cybele Palace opened to the public in Madrid after 12 years of construction.
- The Taiwan Governor-General Railway completed the first leg of the Yilan line in Yilan County, Taiwan, with stations Yilan, Erjie, Luodong, Dongshan, and Su'ao serving the line.
- Football club Hauenstein was established in Hauenstein, Germany.
- Born:
  - Lawrence Ferlinghetti, American poet and publisher, member of the Beat Generation, known for his poetry collection A Coney Island of the Mind, co-founder of the City Lights Bookstore; in Yonkers, New York, United States (d. 2021)
  - John Duncan Sr., American politician, U.S. Representative from Tennessee from 1965 to 1988; in Huntsville, Tennessee, United States (d. 1988)
- Died: Aaron Kosminski, 53, Polish barber, one of the suspects investigated in the Jack the Ripper murders (b. 1865)

== March 25, 1919 (Tuesday) ==
- The New Zealand Division of the New Zealand Expeditionary Force was disbanded.
- The musical revue Joy Bells premiered at the Hippodrome in London with a line-up that included vaudevillian star George Robey, and ran for a successful 723 performances.
- Born: Jeanne Cagney, American actress, known for roles with her brother James Cagney in Yankee Doodle Dandy and The Time of Your Life; in New York City, United States (d. 1984)

== March 26, 1919 (Wednesday) ==
- New York State Senator Clayton R. Lusk was tasked to chair an investigative committee into individuals and organizations suspected of sedition.
- The 15th Australian Brigade was disbanded.
- The Danish-Baltic Auxiliary Corps was established as a military volunteer unit to assist Estonia and Latvia achieve independence from Russia.
- Football club Djerv was established in Haugesund, Norway.
- The borough Glen Gardner, New Jersey was established.
- Born:
  - Strother Martin, American actor, best known for his film roles in The Man Who Shot Liberty Valance, Cool Hand Luke, The Wild Bunch and Butch Cassidy and the Sundance Kid; in Kokomo, Indiana, United States (d. 1980)
  - Joe Egan, English rugby player, hooker for the Wigan Warriors and Leigh Centurions from 1938 to 1955, and the England national rugby league team from 1943 to 1950; in Wigan, England (d. 2012)
- Died: Ernest Henry, 81, British explorer, charted much of northeast Australia (now Queensland) (b. 1869)

== March 27, 1919 (Thursday) ==
- The name Bratislava was officially adopted for the city of Pressburg in Slovakia.
- The 15th Australian Battalion was disbanded.
- Born: Julian Amery, British politician, cabinet minister for the Edward Heath administration; as Harold Julian Amery, in London, England (d. 1996)

== March 28, 1919 (Friday) ==
- Women in Missouri were granted the right to vote in the United States Electoral College.
- The Titles Deprivation Act came into effect, which authorized depriving titles held by nobles that were part of countries against the United Kingdom in World War I. It stripped Charles Edward of his title Duke of Albany, Ernest Augustus for his title Prince of the United Kingdom, and Henry Taaffe of his title as Peerage of Ireland.
- The Sopwith Atlantic aircraft to be used for the first transatlantic flight arrived for assembly at St. John's, Newfoundland and Labrador. Despite its design for the historic long-distance flight, the aircraft's engine overheated on its inaugural journey in May and forced the flight to be abandoned.
- Race horse Poethlyn, ridden by jockey Ernest Piggott, won the 78th renewal of the Grand National horse race at the Aintree Racecourse in Liverpool.
- The village of Rockyford, Alberta, was incorporated.
- Born:
  - Dewey F. Bartlett, American politician, 19th Governor of Oklahoma, U.S. Senator from Oklahoma from 1973 to 1979; in Marietta, Ohio, United States (d. 1979)
  - Tom Brooks, Australian cricketer, bowler for the New South Wales cricket team from 1947 to 1953, umpire for 23 Test cricket matches from 1970 to 1978; in Paddington, New South Wales, Australia (d. 2007)

== March 29, 1919 (Saturday) ==
- The Stanley Cup series final ended undecided when players on both the Montreal Canadiens and Seattle Metropolitans became too ill to play due to the Spanish flu. The hockey final series was tied, 2–2, with the scheduled April 1 game cancelled.
- The Dominion Labor Party of Alberta was established in Calgary following a merger with the Alberta Labor Representation League, and would contest in the 1921 Alberta provincial election.
- Born: Eileen Heckart, American actress, known for film roles in Somebody Up There Likes Me and The Bad Seed, recipient of the Academy Award for Best Supporting Actress for Butterflies Are Free; as Anna Eileen Herbert, in Columbus, Ohio, United States (d. 2001)

== March 30, 1919 (Sunday) ==
- The 105th Siege Battery of the Royal Garrison Artillery, British Army was disbanded in Le Havre, France.
- The 105th Medium Battery of the Royal Australian Artillery was disbanded.
- Russian aviation designer Igor Sikorsky fled Europe for the United States.
- Football club Bad Vilbel was established at Bad Vilbel, Germany.
- Born: McGeorge Bundy, American public servant, 6th U.S. National Security Advisor; in Boston, United States (d. 1996)

== March 31, 1919 (Monday) ==
- Egyptian Revolution – British forces suppressed the most violent part of the revolution in Egypt, with reports of some 800 Egyptians killed and another 1,600 wounded, along with 31 European civilians killed. However, student and intellectual demonstrations for Egyptian independence continued in the cities while violent attacks against British military personnel in the rural areas went on for another four months.
- Battle of Bolshie Ozerki – The Allies amassed 2,000 troops to retake the village of Bolshie Ozerki, Russia while the Red Army assembled 7,000 soldiers to counter the offensive. A barrage of White Russian artillery drove back the first Red Army assault with heavy casualties.
- Tens of thousands of miners in the Ruhr of Germany agreed to unionize and go on strike.
- The 1st, 2nd, 3rd Cavalry Divisions, as well as the 1st, 2nd, 3rd, 4th, 5th, 6th, and 7th, and 9th Cavalry Brigades of the British Army were disbanded.
- The 93rd Aero Squadron of the United States Army Air Service was disbanded.
- The Belgian airline Syndicat national d'Etude des Transports Aériens or SNETA was formed near Brussels and established commercial flights to London, Amsterdam, and Paris. It would merge with airline Sabena in 1923.
- The official building to house the office of the Governor-General of Taiwan was opened in Taipei. It is now the Presidential Office Building for the office of the President of the Republic of China.
- The British Armed Forces began publishing The Cologne Post for British soldiers handling occupation in former German territory after World War I. The military paper ran until 1926.
- Football club Novese was established in Novi Ligure, Italy.
- Born: Jack L. Treadwell, American army officer, commander of the 180th Cavalry Regiment during World War II, recipient of the Medal of Honor, Silver Star, Distinguished Service Cross, four Legion of Merits, 13 Air Medals, and Distinguished Flying Cross; in Ashland, Alabama, United States (d. 1977)
