= Yachiho Station =

Railway station in Sakuho, Nagano Prefecture, Japan

Yachiho Station 八千穂駅
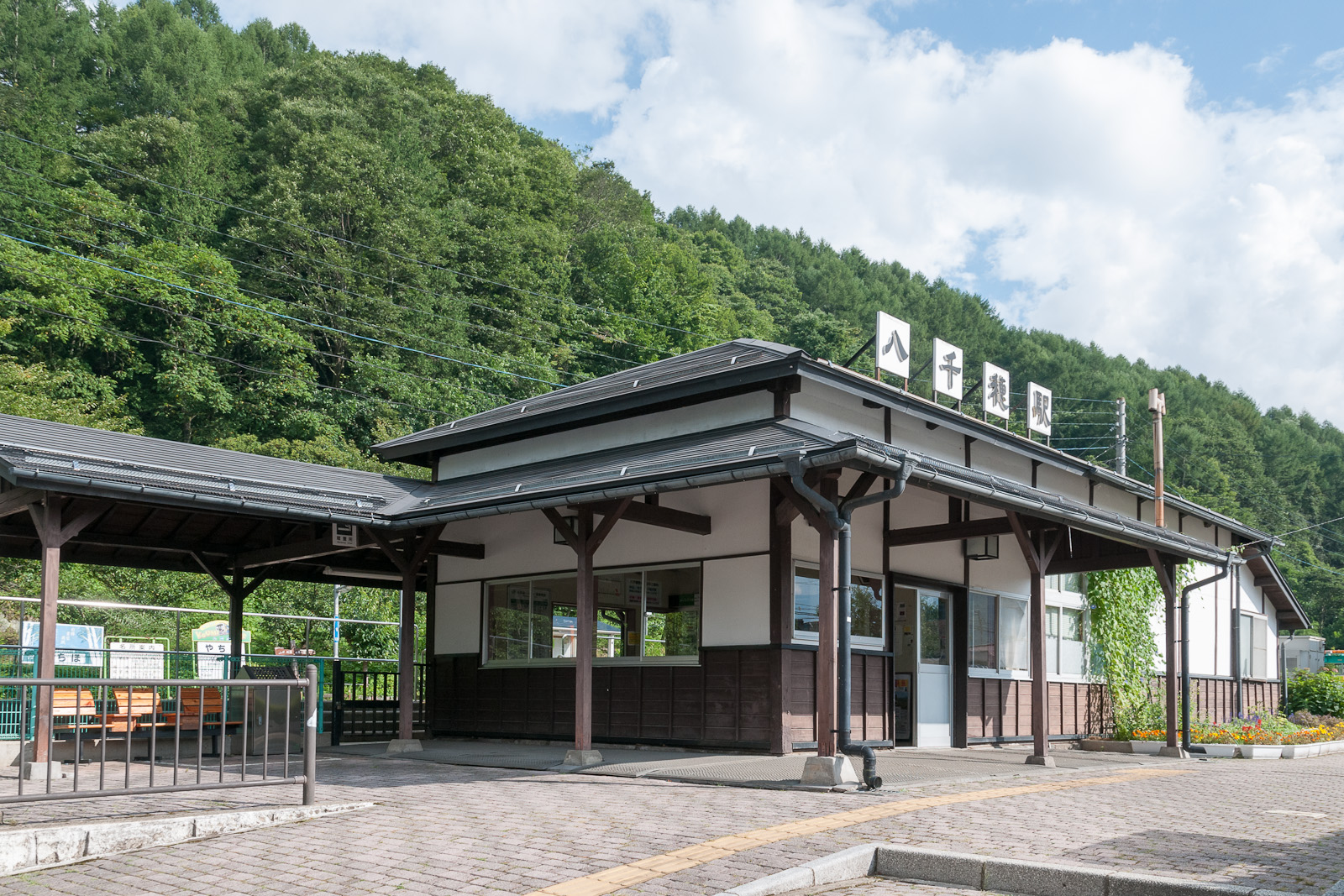
- Yachiho Station in July 2012

General information
- Location: Hozumi, Sakuho-machi, Minamisaku-gun, Nagano-ken 384-0702; Japan
- Coordinates: 36.1334°N 138.4774°E
- Elevation: 785.4 meters
- Operator: JR East
- Line: ■ Koumi Line
- Distance: 53.9 km from Kobuchizawa
- Platforms: 2 side platforms
- Tracks: 2

Other information
- Status: Staffed
- Website: Official website

History
- Opened: 11 March 1919
- Former names: Sakuhozumi Station (until 1959)

Passengers
- FY2015: 123 (daily)

Services
Preceding station	JR East	Following station
Kaize towards Komoro	Koumi Line	Takaiwa towards Kobuchizawa
Location
- Location within Nagano Prefecture Location within Japan

Yachiho Station (八千穂駅, Yachiho-eki) is a railway station on the Koumi Line in the town of Sakuho, Minamisaku District, Nagano Prefecture, Japan, operated by East Japan Railway Company (JR East).

== Lines ==
Yachiho Station is served by the Koumi Line, and is 53.9 kilometers from the starting point of the line at Kobuchizawa Station.

== Layout ==
The station has two ground-level opposed side platforms connected by a level crossing.

=== Platforms ===
station side	■ Koumi Line	for Koumi and Kobuchizawa
opposite side	■ Koumi Line	for Nakagomi and Komoro

== History ==
The station opened on 11 March 1919 as Sakuhozumi Station (佐久穂積駅). It was renamed Yachiho on 1 October 1959. With the privatization of Japanese National Railways (JNR) on 1 April 1987, the station came under the control of JR East.

== Passenger statistics ==
In fiscal 2015, the station was used by an average of 123 passengers daily (boarding passengers only).

== Surrounding area ==
- Chikuma River
- former Yachiyo Village Hall
- National Route 141
- Yachiyo Post Office

== See also ==
- List of railway stations in Japan
