= Haguroshita Station =

Railway station in Sakuho, Nagano Prefecture, Japan

Haguroshita Station 羽黒下駅
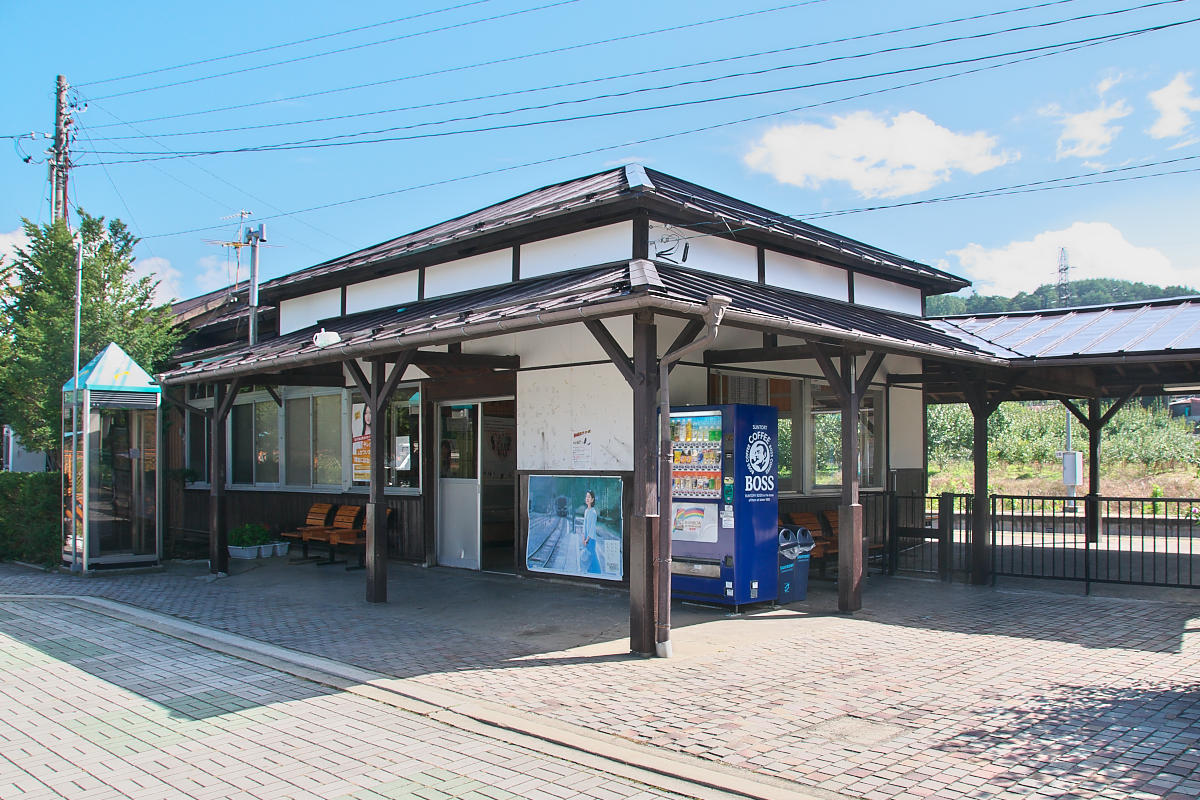
- Haguroshita Station in October 2008

General information
- Location: 115 Hirabayashi, Sakuho-machi, Minamisaku-gun, Nagano-ken 384-0611; Japan
- Coordinates: 36.1666°N 138.4898°E
- Elevation: 740.7 meters
- Operator: JR East
- Line: ■ Koumi Line
- Distance: 57.8 km from Kobuchizawa
- Platforms: 2 side platforms
- Tracks: 2

Other information
- Status: Staffed
- Website: Official website

History
- Opened: 25 December 1915

Passengers
- FY2015: 118 (daily)

Services
Preceding station	JR East	Following station
Aonuma towards Komoro	Koumi Line	Kaize towards Kobuchizawa
Location
- Location within Nagano Prefecture Location within Japan

Haguroshita Station (羽黒下駅, Haguroshita-eki) is a train station on the Koumi Line in the town of Sakuho, Minamisaku District, Nagano Prefecture, Japan, operated by East Japan Railway Company (JR East).

== Lines ==
Haguroshita Station is served by the Koumi Line and is 57.8 kilometers from the starting point of the line at Kobuchizawa Station.

== Station layout ==
The station consists of two ground-level side platforms connected by a level crossing. The station is staffed.

=== Platforms ===
1	■ Koumi Line	for Koumi and Kobuchizawa
2	■ Koumi Line	for Nakagomi and Komoro

== History ==
Haguroshita Station opened on 25 December 1915. With the privatization of Japanese National Railways (JNR) on 1 April 1987, the station came under the control of JR East.

== Passenger statistics ==
In fiscal 2015, the station was used by an average of 118 passengers daily (boarding passengers only).

== Surrounding area ==
- Chikuma River
- Haguroshita Post Office
- National Route 141

== See also ==
- List of railway stations in Japan
