= Takaiwa Station (Nagano) =

Railway station in Sakuho, Nagano Prefecture, Japan

Takaiwa Station 高岩駅
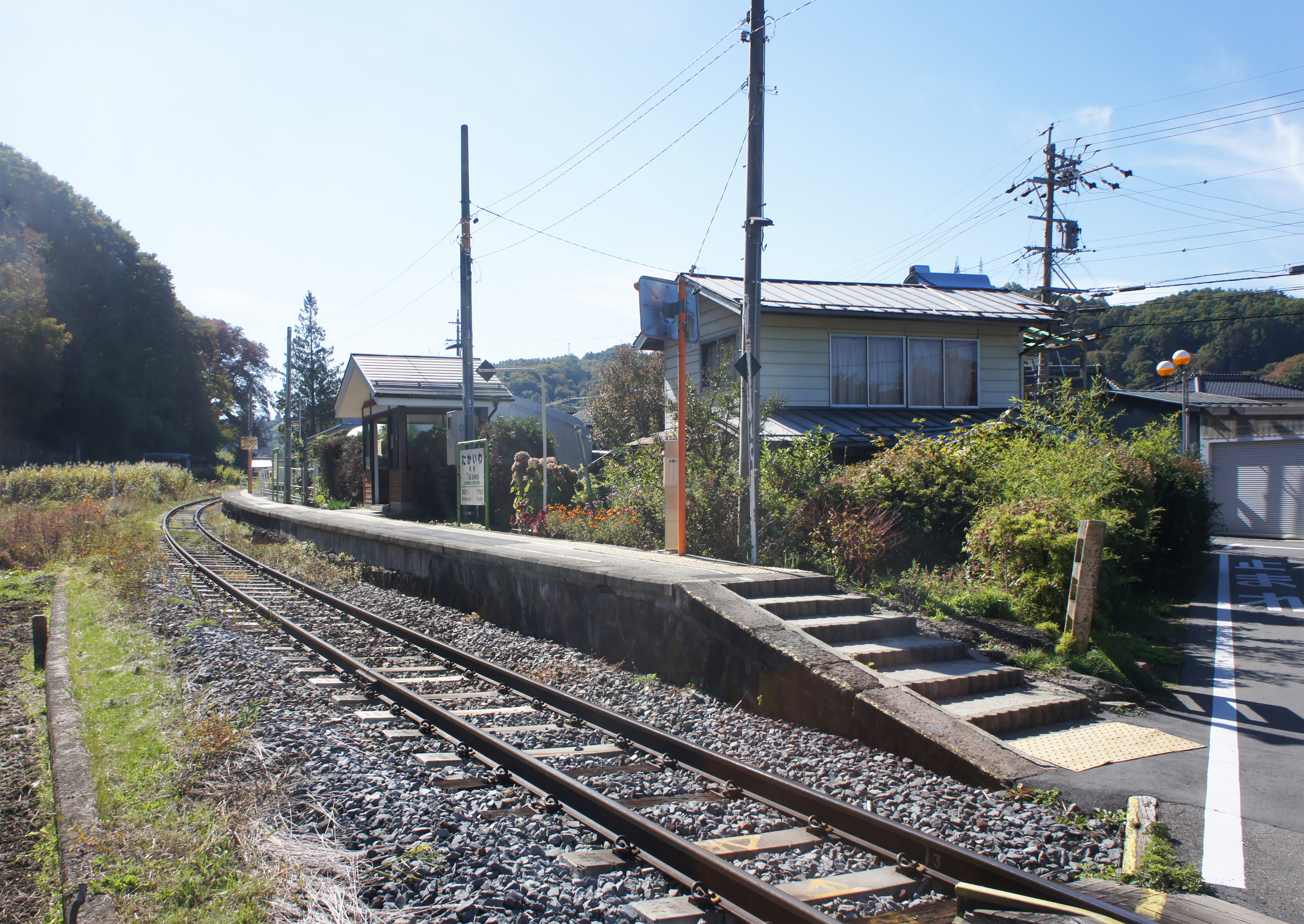
- Takaiwa Station, October 2021

General information
- Location: Hozumi, Sakuho-machi, Minamisaku-gun, Nagano-ken 384-0702; Japan
- Coordinates: 36°06′57″N 138°28′38″E
- Elevation: 812.9 meters
- Operator: JR East
- Line: ■ Koumi Line
- Distance: 51.7 km from Kobuchizawa
- Platforms: 1 side platform

Other information
- Status: Unstaffed
- Website: Official website

History
- Opened: 11 March 1919

Services
Preceding station	JR East	Following station
Yachiho towards Komoro	Koumi Line	Managashi towards Kobuchizawa
Location
- Location within Nagano Prefecture Location within Japan

Takaiwa Station (高岩駅, Takaiwa-eki) is a train station in the town of Sakuho, Minamisaku District, Nagano Prefecture, Japan, operated by East Japan Railway Company (JR East).

== Lines ==
Takaiwa Station is served by the Koumi Line and is 51.7 kilometers from the terminus of the line at Kobuchizawa Station.

== Station layout ==
The station consists of one ground-level side platform serving a single bi-directional track. The station is unattended.

== History ==
Takaiwa Station opened on 11 March 1919. With the privatization of Japanese National Railways (JNR) on 1 April 1987, the station came under the control of JR East. On 19 December 1995, the station building burned down in an act of arson and was replaced with a log cabin structure in 1996.

== Surrounding area ==
- Chikuma River
- Koumi High School
- National Route 141

== See also ==
- List of railway stations in Japan
