= Kaize Station =

Kaize Station is the name of two train stations in Japan:

- Kaize Station (Nagano) (海瀬駅)
- Kaize Station (Nagasaki) (皆瀬駅)
