= Takaiwa Station =

Takaiwa Station (高岩駅) is the name of two train stations in Japan:

- Takaiwa Station (Nagano)
- Takaiwa Station (Nagasaki)
