= Managashi Station =

Railway station in Koumi, Nagano Prefecture, Japan

Managashi Station 馬流駅
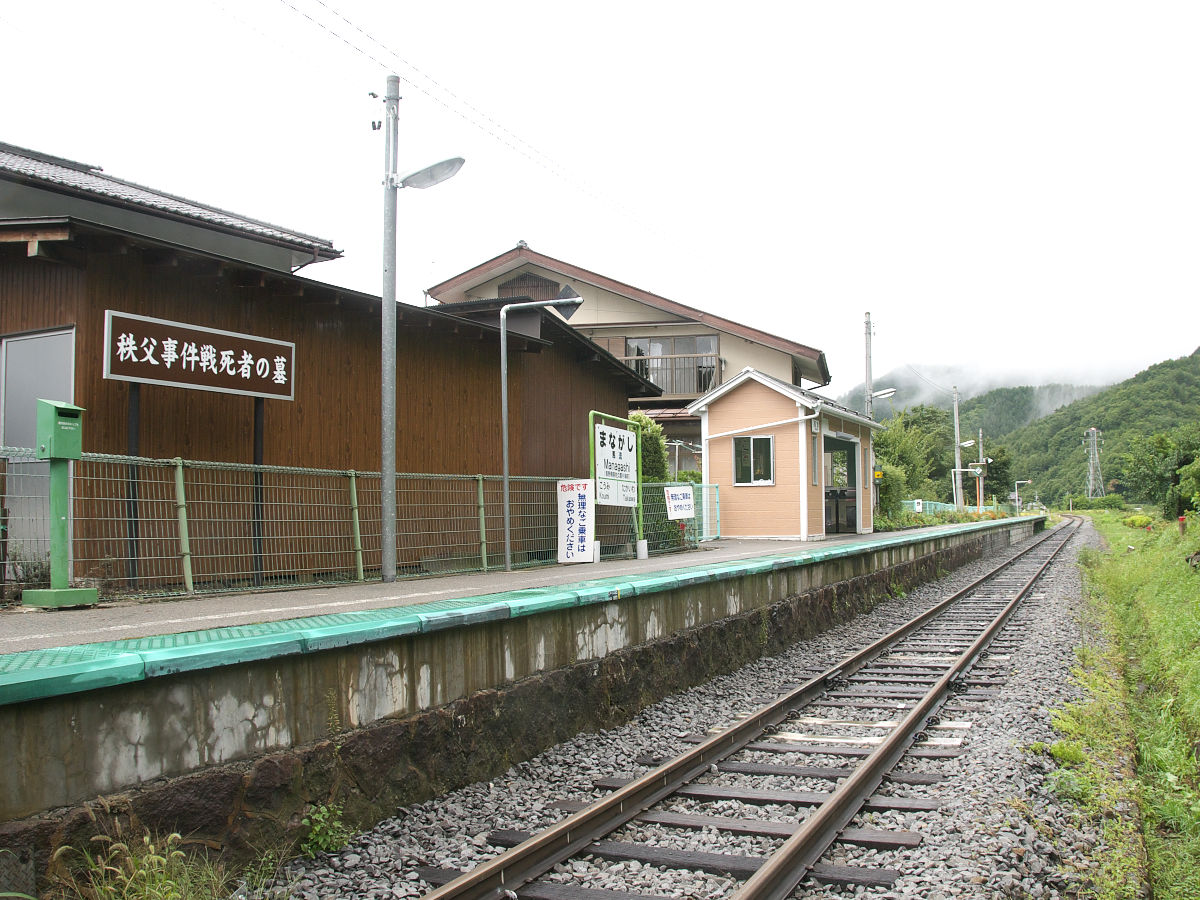
- Managashi Station, September 2008

General information
- Location: Higashi-Managashi, Koumi-machi, Minamisaku-gun, Nagano-ken 384-1101; Japan
- Coordinates: 36.1020°N 138.4861°E
- Elevation: 814.5 meters
- Operator: JR East
- Line: ■ Koumi Line
- Distance: 49.9 km from Kobuchizawa
- Platforms: 1 side platform

Other information
- Website: Official website

History
- Opened: 11 March 1919

Services
Preceding station	JR East	Following station
Takaiwa towards Komoro	Koumi Line	Koumi towards Kobuchizawa
Location
- Location within Nagano Prefecture Location within Japan

Managashi Station (馬流駅, Managashi-eki) is a train station in the town of Koumi, Minamisaku District, Nagano Prefecture, Japan, operated by East Japan Railway Company (JR East).

== Lines ==
Managashi Station is served by the Koumi Line and is 49.9 kilometers from the terminus of the line at Kobuchizawa Station.

== Station layout ==
The station consists of one ground-level side platform serving a single bi-directional track. The station is unattended.

== History ==
Managashi Station opened on 11 March 1919. With the privatization of Japanese National Railways (JNR) on 1 April 1987, the station came under the control of JR East.

== Surrounding area ==
- Chikuma River
- Koumi High School
- Chichibu incident Historical Park
- National Route 141

== See also ==
- List of railway stations in Japan
