= Koumi Line =

Railway line in Yamanashi & Nagano Prefectures, Japan

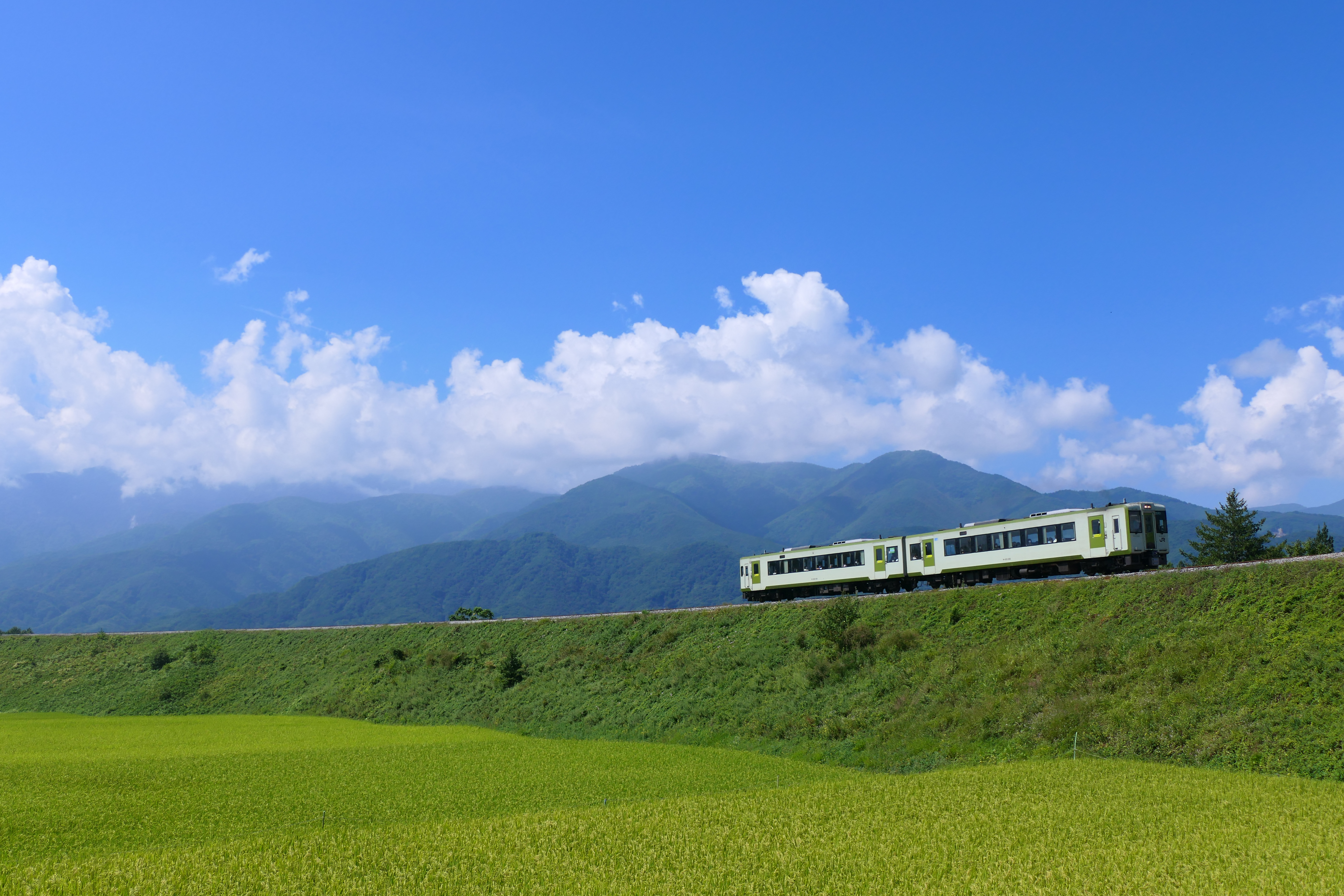
- JR East KiHa 110 series DMU on the Koumi Line

Overview
- Native name: 小海線
- Status: In operation
- Owner: JR East
- Locale: Yamanashi, Nagano prefectures
- Termini: Kobuchizawa; Komoro
- Stations: 31

Service
- Type: Regional rail
- Operator(s): JR East
- Rolling stock: KiHa E200 DMU, KiHa 110 series DMU

History
- Opened: August 8, 1919; 106 years ago

Technical
- Line length: 78.9 km (49.0 mi)
- Number of tracks: Entire line single tracked
- Character: Rural and scenic
- Track gauge: 1,067 mm (3 ft 6 in)
- Electrification: None
- Operating speed: 85 km/h (53 mph)
Route map

The Koumi Line (小海線, Koumi-sen) is a railway line in Japan operated by East Japan Railway Company (JR East). It links Kobuchizawa Station in Hokuto, Yamanashi with Komoro Station in Komoro, Nagano, and extends 78.9 km (49.0 mi) through the mountains with a total of 31 stations. It roughly follows the route of National Route 141, paralleling the road at some places and crossing it twice.

The southern section of the line is also known as the Yatsugatake Kogen Line, as it runs along the southeastern foot of the Yatsugatake Mountains.

== Stations ==
All local trains stop at all stations. Extra rapid trains stop at specific stations.

Some of the stations along the Koumi Line are among the highest in Japan, with Nobeyama Station reaching 1,345 meters (4,413 ft) above sea level. Because of the frequent stops and winding route, the full 78.9 kilometers (49.0 mi) journey often takes as long as two and a half hours to traverse. However, the journey is known for its scenery, in which passengers can see nature, highlands, high mountains and one of the most beautiful starlit skies at night.

Local trains run between Koumi or Nakagomi and Komoro, between Kobuchizawa and Nobeyama or Koumi respectively, excluding local trains running the full length of the line. In 2022, JR East announced the names of railway lines which were failing to make a profit, which included the section of this line between Koumi and Kobuchizawa.

Local trains are driver-only operated (one-person operation) between Nakagomi and Kobuchizawa. However, lots of passengers use the stations between Nakagomi and Komoro, so local trains in this section have conductors onboard.

Nakagomi Station is located near the Koumi Line Operation Office, where many train staff are working.

Station	Japanese	Yatsugatake Kogen Ressha	High Rail 1375	Distance (km)		Transfers		Location	
Station	Japanese	Yatsugatake Kogen Ressha	High Rail 1375	Between stations	Total	Transfers		Location	
Kobuchizawa	小淵沢	●	●	-	0.0	Chūō Main Line	∨	Hokuto	Yamanashi
Kai-Koizumi	甲斐小泉	●	|	7.1	7.1		｜	Hokuto	Yamanashi
Kai-Ōizumi	甲斐大泉	●	|	5.1	12.2		◇	Hokuto	Yamanashi
Kiyosato	清里	●	●	5.3	17.5		◇	Hokuto	Yamanashi
Nobeyama	野辺山	●	●	5.9	23.4		◇	Minamimaki, Minamisaku District	Nagano
Shinano-Kawakami	信濃川上	▼	◆	8.1	31.5		◇	Kawakami, Minamisaku	Nagano
Saku-Hirose	佐久広瀬	↓	|	3.4	34.9		｜	Minamimaki, Minamisaku	Nagano
Saku-Uminokuchi	佐久海ノ口	↓	|	4.8	39.7		｜	Minamimaki, Minamisaku	Nagano
Umijiri	海尻	↓	|	2.4	42.1		｜	Minamimaki, Minamisaku	Nagano
Matsubarako	松原湖	↓	|	2.7	44.8		｜	Koumi, Minamisaku	Nagano
Koumi	小海	▼	●	3.5	48.3		◇	Koumi, Minamisaku	Nagano
Managashi	馬流	↓	|	1.6	49.9		｜	Koumi, Minamisaku	Nagano
Takaiwa	高岩	↓	|	1.8	51.7		｜	Sakuho, Minamisaku	Nagano
Yachiho	八千穂	↓	◆	2.2	53.9		｜	Sakuho, Minamisaku	Nagano
Kaize	海瀬	↓	|	2.6	56.5		｜	Sakuho, Minamisaku	Nagano
Haguroshita	羽黒下	↓	|	1.3	57.8		◇	Sakuho, Minamisaku	Nagano
Aonuma	青沼	↓	|	1.7	59.5		｜	Saku	Nagano
Usuda	臼田	↓	◆	1.4	60.9		｜	Saku	Nagano
Tatsuokajō	龍岡城	↓	|	1.2	62.1		｜	Saku	Nagano
Ōtabe	太田部	↓	|	2.0	64.1		｜	Saku	Nagano
Nakagomi	中込	▼	●	1.4	65.5		◇	Saku	Nagano
Namezu	滑津		|	1.0	66.5		｜	Saku	Nagano
Kita-Nakagomi	北中込		|	1.9	68.4		｜	Saku	Nagano
Iwamurada	岩村田		◆	2.2	70.6		◇	Saku	Nagano
Sakudaira	佐久平		●	0.9	71.5	Hokuriku Shinkansen	｜	Saku	Nagano
Nakasato	中佐都		|	0.9	72.4		｜	Saku	Nagano
Misato	美里		|	1.4	73.8		｜	Komoro	Nagano
Mitsuoka	三岡		|	1.5	75.3		◇	Komoro	Nagano
Otome	乙女		|	1.1	76.4		｜	Komoro	Nagano
Higashi-Komoro	東小諸		|	1.0	77.4		｜	Komoro	Nagano
Komoro	小諸		●	1.5	78.9	Shinano Railway Line	∧	Komoro	Nagano

Legend

◇・∨・∧ - passing loop
｜ - no passing loop

== Rolling stock ==
- KiHa 110 series DMUs, since November 1991
- KiHa E200 hybrid DMUs, since July 2007
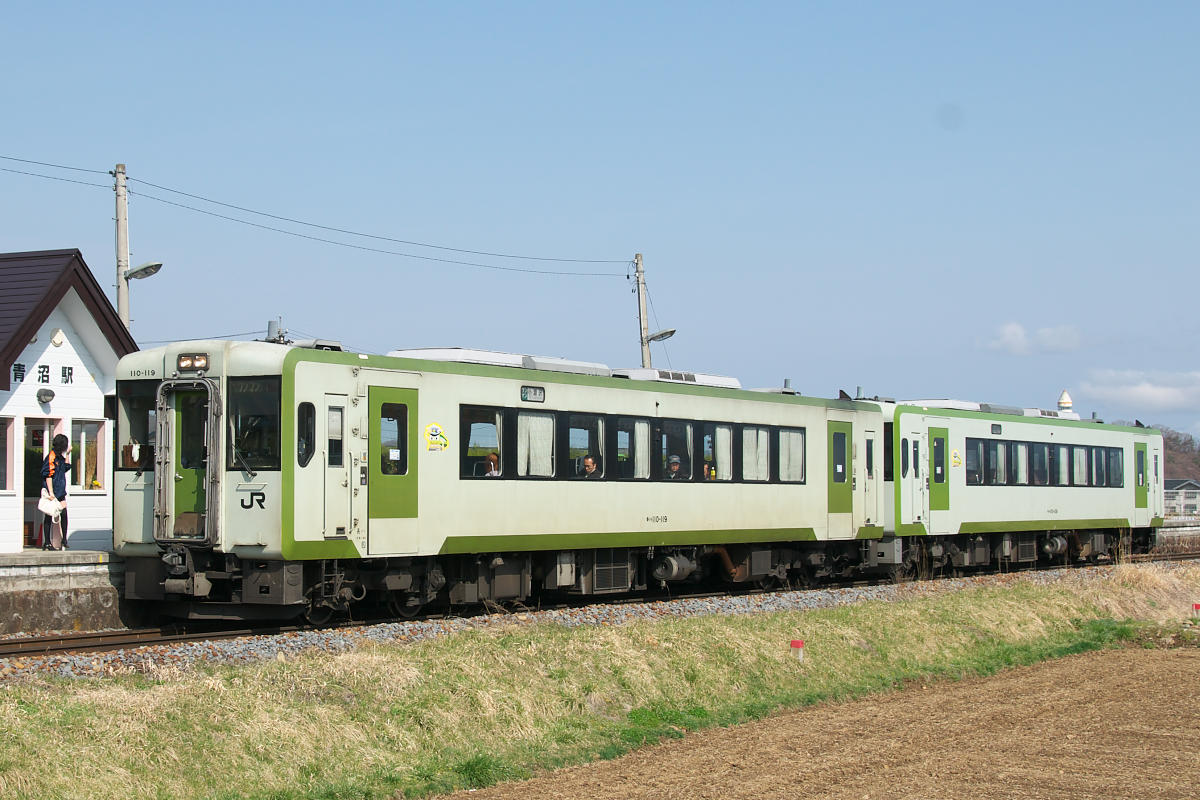
A two-car KiHa 110 series train on the Koumi Line, April 2008

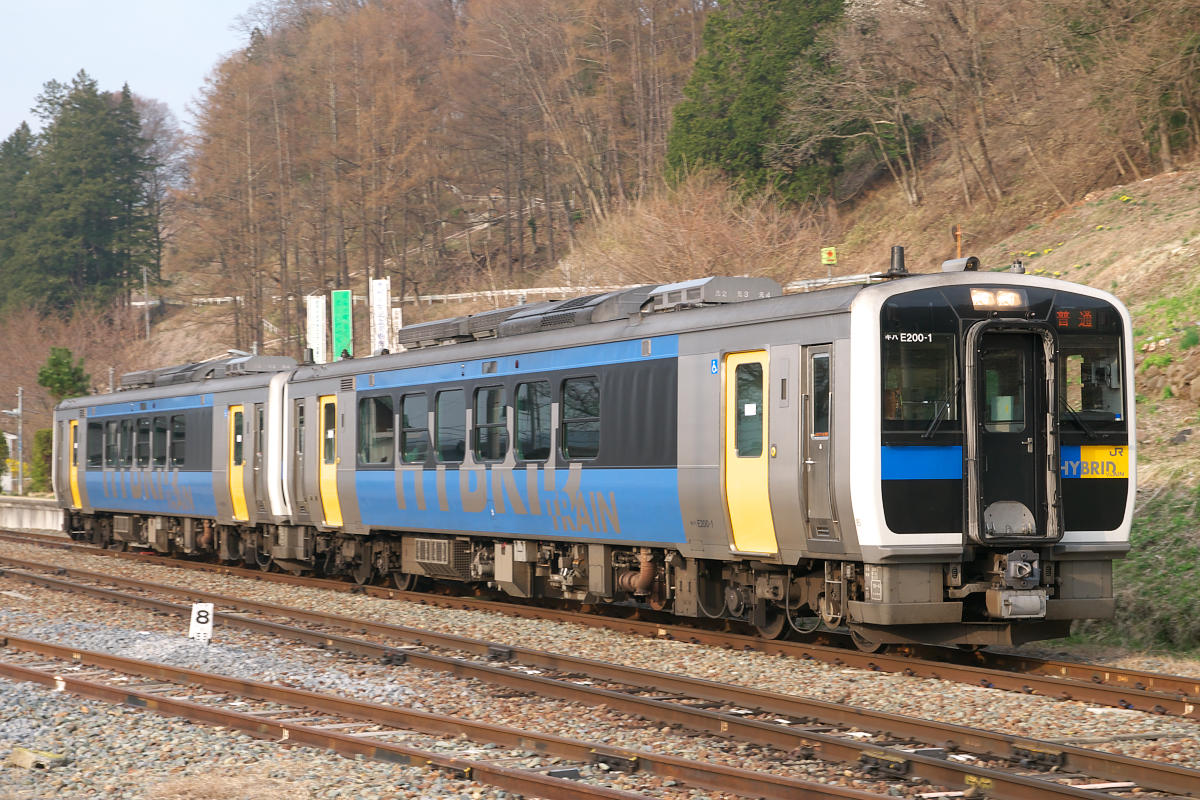
A two-car KiHa E200 series train on the Koumi Line, April 2009

=== Special liveries ===
In February 2015, to mark the 80th anniversary of the opening of the Koumi Line, a single-car KiHa 110 series unit was repainted into the "Metropolitan" all-over red livery carried by KiHa 52 DMUs formerly used on the line. This was followed in March 2015 by a two-car KiHa 110 series unit repainted into the vermillion and cream livery carried by KiHa 58 series DMUs formerly used on the line.

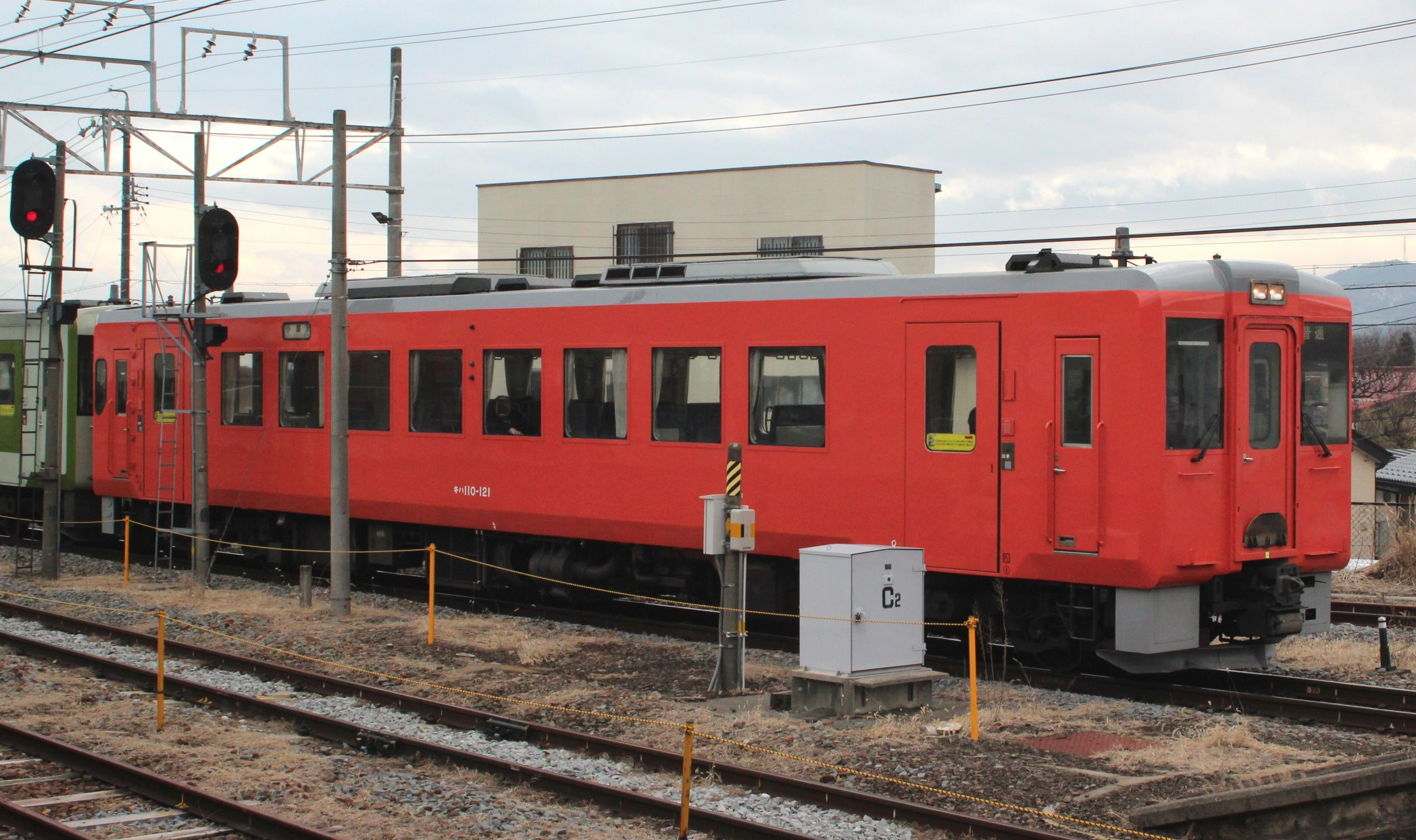
Koumi Line KiHa 110-121 in "Metropolitan" all-over red livery, February 2015

== History ==
The Saku Railway opened the section from Komoro to Haguroshita in 1915, and extended the line to Koumi in 1919. The company planned a railway network extending from Kōfu in the south to Naoetsu and Nagaoka in the north, linking up with the Fuji Minobe Railway to create a coast-to-coast rail line. North of Komoro, Saku Railway obtained a construction permit for a section between Yashiro and Suzaka, but this was transferred to the local Katō Railway (predecessor of the Nagano Electric Railway). Due to World War I construction of the line south of Koumi was not undertaken. Diesel railcars were introduced on the line in 1930.

The Koumi - Saku-Uminokuchi section was opened in 1932 by Japanese National Railways (JNR), which also opened the Kobuchizawa — Kiyosato section in 1933. The Saku Railway was nationalised in 1934, and the Saku-Uminokuchi - Kiyosato section opened in 1935, completing the line.

In July 2017, JR East launched the tourist train High Rail 1375. "1375" refers to the elevation of 1,375 m of the highest point on any JR line in Japan. The train makes the most of its backdrop, and offers unique services for day and night operations.

=== Timeline ===
- November 29, 1935: Nobeyama Station opens.
- March 1, 1944: Kubo Station renamed Kita-Nakagomi Station. Namezu Station closed.
- November 11, 1944: Operations stopped at Managashi, Irizawa, Ōnara, and Otome stations.
- March 1, 1952: Second Namezu Station opens. Operations resume at Managashi, Aonuma (formerly Irizawa), Tatsuokajō (formerly Ōnara), Otome stations.
- May 1, 1952: Ōtabe Station opens.
- July 10, 1952: Higashi-Komoro Station opens.
- October 1, 1959: Sakuhozumi Station renamed Yachiho Station.
- October 1, 1963: Sandanda Station renamed Usuda Station.
- February 1, 1984: Freight operations end.
- July 26, 1986: Photo Deck Station opens.
- September 1, 1986: Photo Deck Station closes.
- April 1, 1987: With the privatization and breakup of JNR, line becomes part of East Japan Railway Company (JR East).
- December 1, 1988: Misato Station opens.
- November 8, 1991: KiHa 110 series DMUs begin operation.
- March 14, 1992: Driver-only operation begins.
- October 12, 1995: Iwamurada — Nakasato section elevated.
- October 1, 1997: Sakudaira Station opens.
- July 31, 2007: KiHa E200 series hybrid DMUs begin operation.

== See also ==
- List of railway lines in Japan
