= Kaize Station (Nagano) =

Railway station in Sakuho, Nagano Prefecture, Japan

Kaize Station 海瀬駅
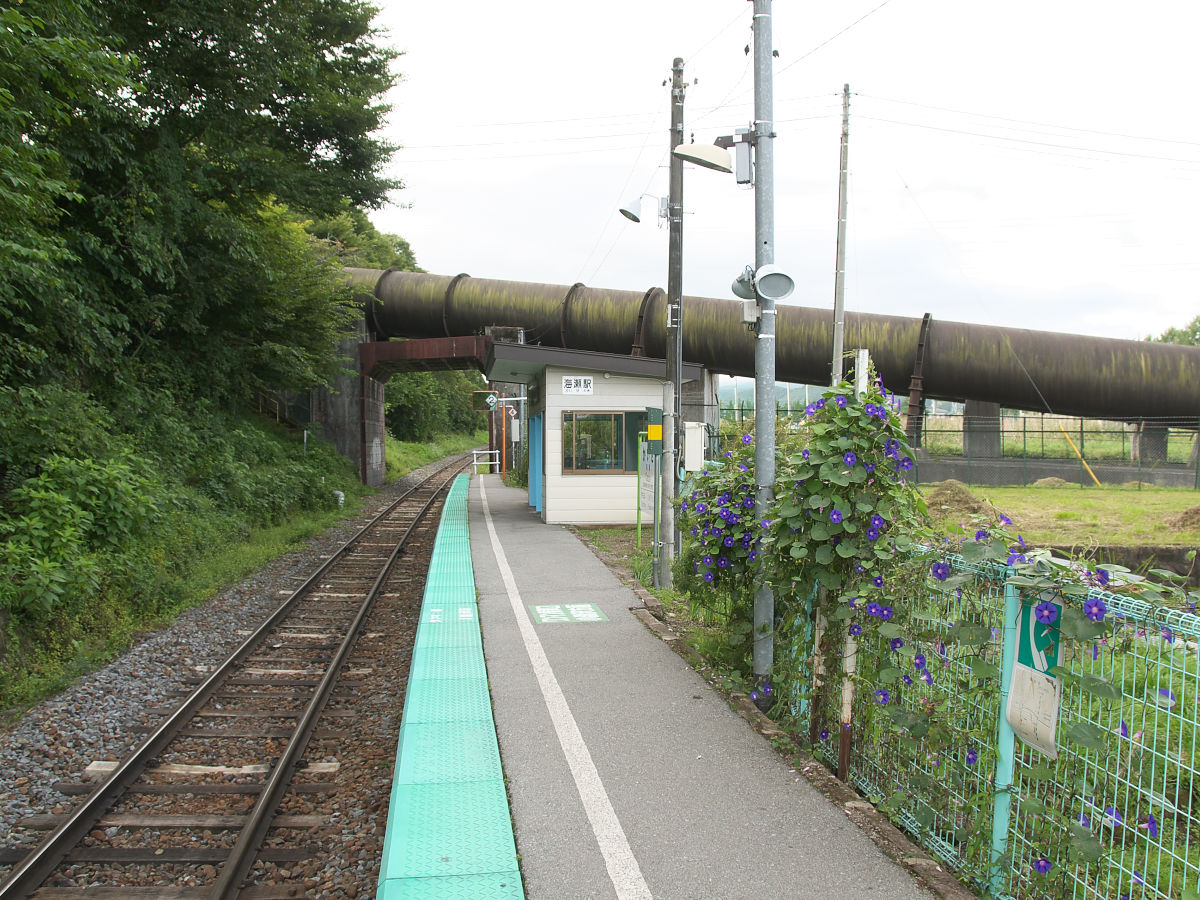
- Kaize Station, September 2008

General information
- Location: Kaize, Sakuho-machi, Minamisaku-gun, Nagano-ken 384-0503; Japan
- Coordinates: 36.1560°N 138.4861°E
- Elevation: 755.2 meters
- Operator: JR East
- Line: ■ Koumi Line
- Distance: 56.5 km from Kobuchizawa
- Platforms: 1 side platform

Other information
- Status: Unstaffed
- Website: Official website

History
- Opened: 11 March 1919

Passengers
- FY2011: 137

Services
Preceding station	JR East	Following station
Haguroshita towards Komoro	Koumi Line	Yachiho towards Kobuchizawa
Location
- Location within Nagano Prefecture Location within Japan

Kaize Station (海瀬駅, Kaize-eki) is a train station in the town of Sakuho, Minamisaku District, Nagano Prefecture, Japan, operated by East Japan Railway Company (JR East).

== Lines ==
Kaize Station is served by the Koumi Line and is 56.5 kilometers from the terminus of the line at Kobuchizawa Station.

== Station layout ==
The station consists of one ground-level side platform serving a single bi-directional track. The station is unattended.

== History ==
Kaize Station opened on 11 March 1919. With the privatization of Japanese National Railways (JNR) on 1 April 1987, the station came under the control of JR East.

== Surrounding area ==
- Sakuho Town Hall
- Sakuho Elementary School
- Sakuho Middle School
- National Route 299

== See also ==
- List of railway stations in Japan
