= Koumi Station =

Railway station in Koumi, Nagano Prefecture, Japan

Koumi Station 小海駅
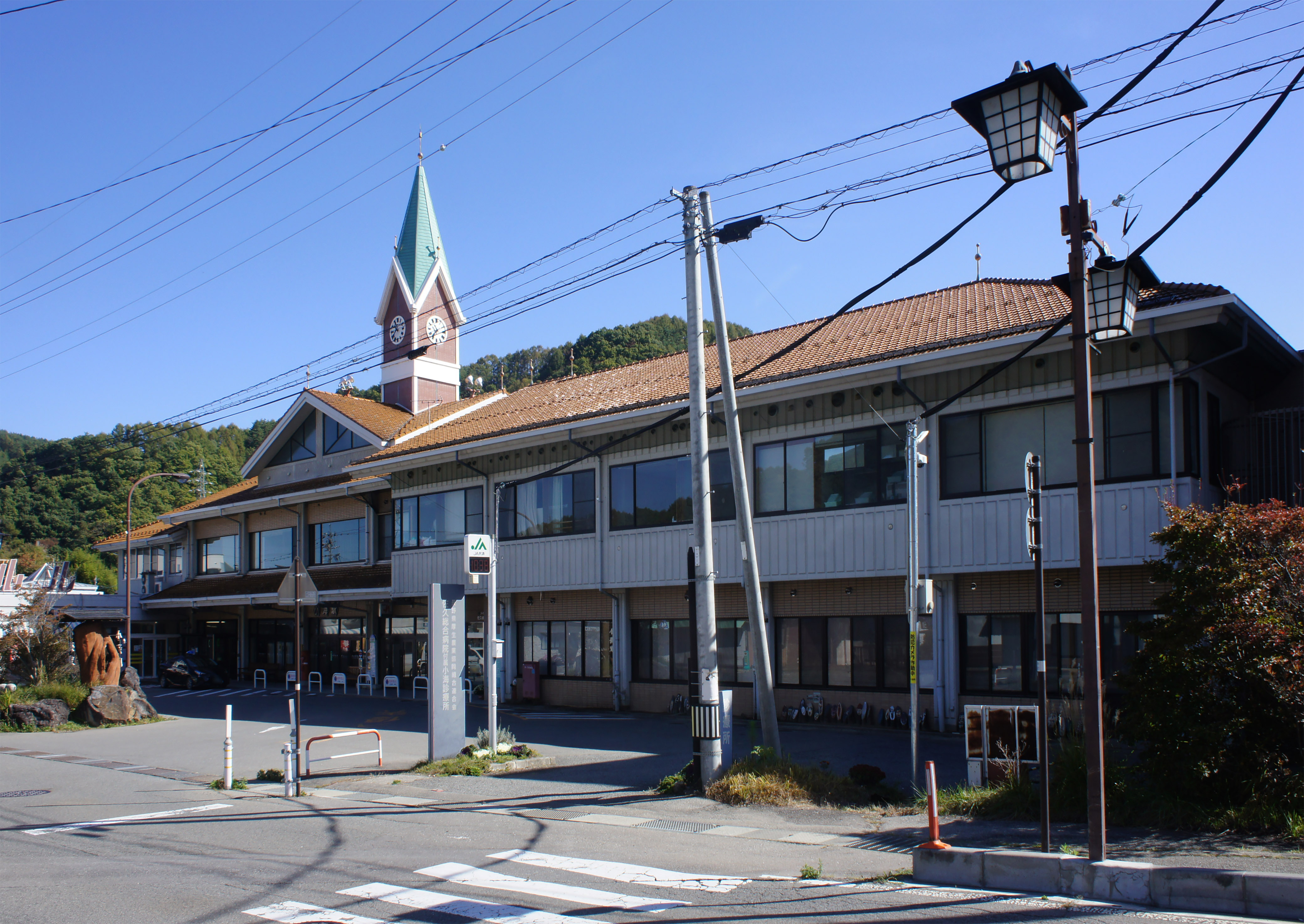
- Koumi Station, October 2021

General information
- Location: 4269 Koumi, Koumi-machi, Minamisaku-gun, Nagano-ken 384-1102; Japan
- Coordinates: 36.0888°N 138.4827°E
- Elevation: 865.1 meters
- Operator: JR East
- Line: ■ Koumi Line
- Distance: 48.3 km from Kobuchizawa
- Platforms: 1 side + 1 island platform

Other information
- Status: Staffed (Midori no Madoguchi)
- Website: Official website

History
- Opened: 11 March 1919

Passengers
- FY2015: 199 (daily)

Services
Preceding station	JR East	Following station
Managashi towards Komoro	Koumi Line	Matsubarako towards Kobuchizawa
Location
- Location within Nagano Prefecture Location within Japan

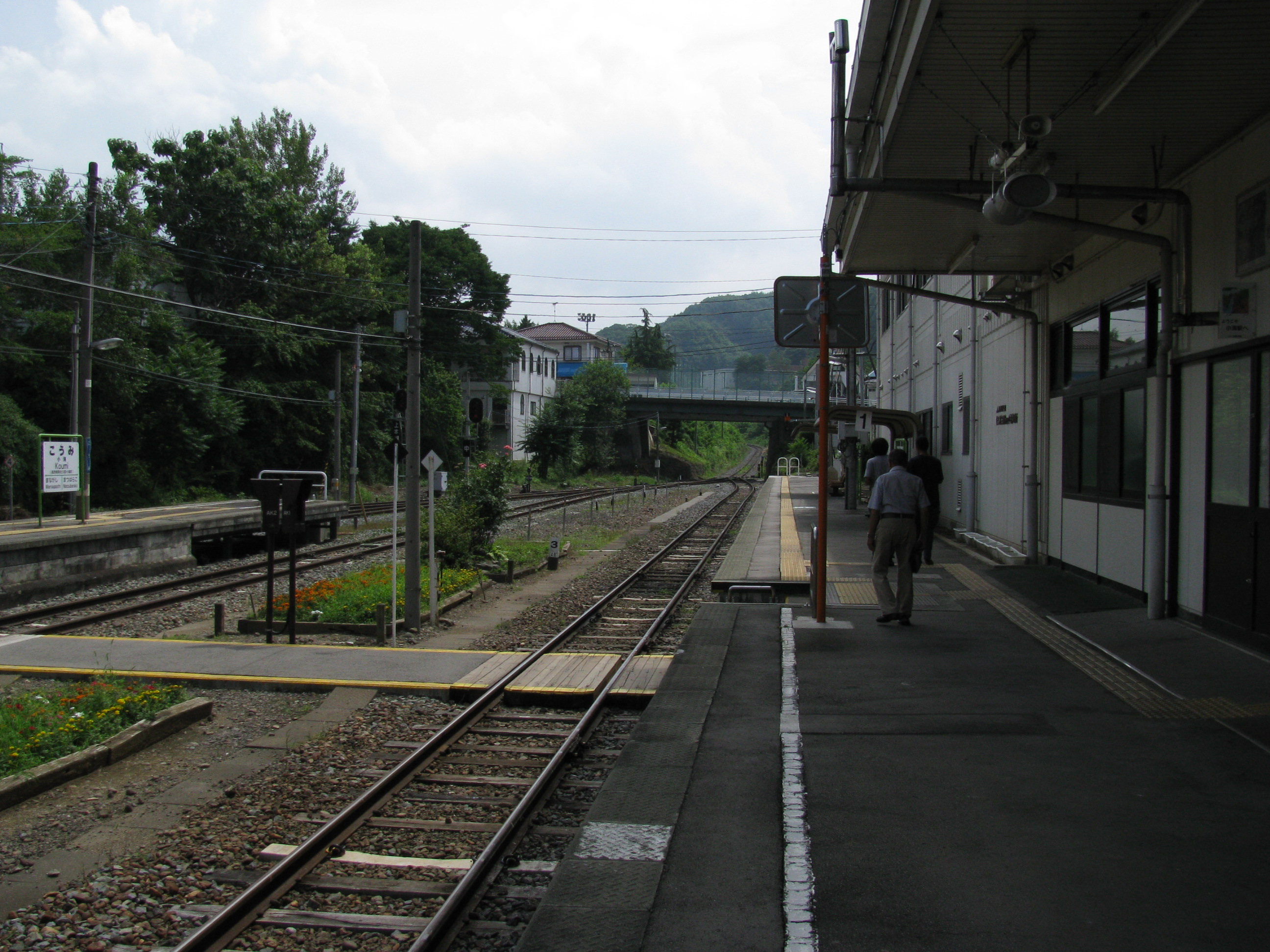
Level crossing at Koumi Station

Koumi Station (小海駅, Koumi-eki) is a train station in the town of Koumi, Minamisaku District, Nagano Prefecture, Japan, operated by East Japan Railway Company (JR East).

== Lines ==
Koumi Station is served by the Koumi Line and is 48.3 kilometers from the terminus of the line at Kobuchizawa Station.

== Station layout ==
The station consists of one ground-level side platform and one island platform connected to the station building by a level crossing. The station has a Midori no Madoguchi staffed ticket office.

=== Platforms ===
1	■ Koumi Line	for Sakudaira and Komoro
2	■ Koumi Line	for Nobeyama and Kobuchizawa
3	■ Koumi Line	(starting trains)

== History ==
Koumi Station opened on 11 March 1919. With the privatization of Japanese National Railways (JNR) on 1 April 1987, the station came under the control of JR East.

== Passenger statistics ==
In fiscal 2015, the station was used by an average of 199 passengers daily (boarding passengers only).

== Surrounding area ==
- Chikuma River
- Koumi Town Hall
- National Route 141

== Bus routes ==
- Koumi Town-Run Bus
  - For Ota Danchi (This bus stop is located near Chikuma Bus Ōshirokawa bus stop)
- Kitaaiki Village-Run Bus
- Minamiaiki Village-Run Bus

== See also ==
- List of railway stations in Japan
