= Sakuho, Nagano =

Sakuho 佐久穂町
- Town
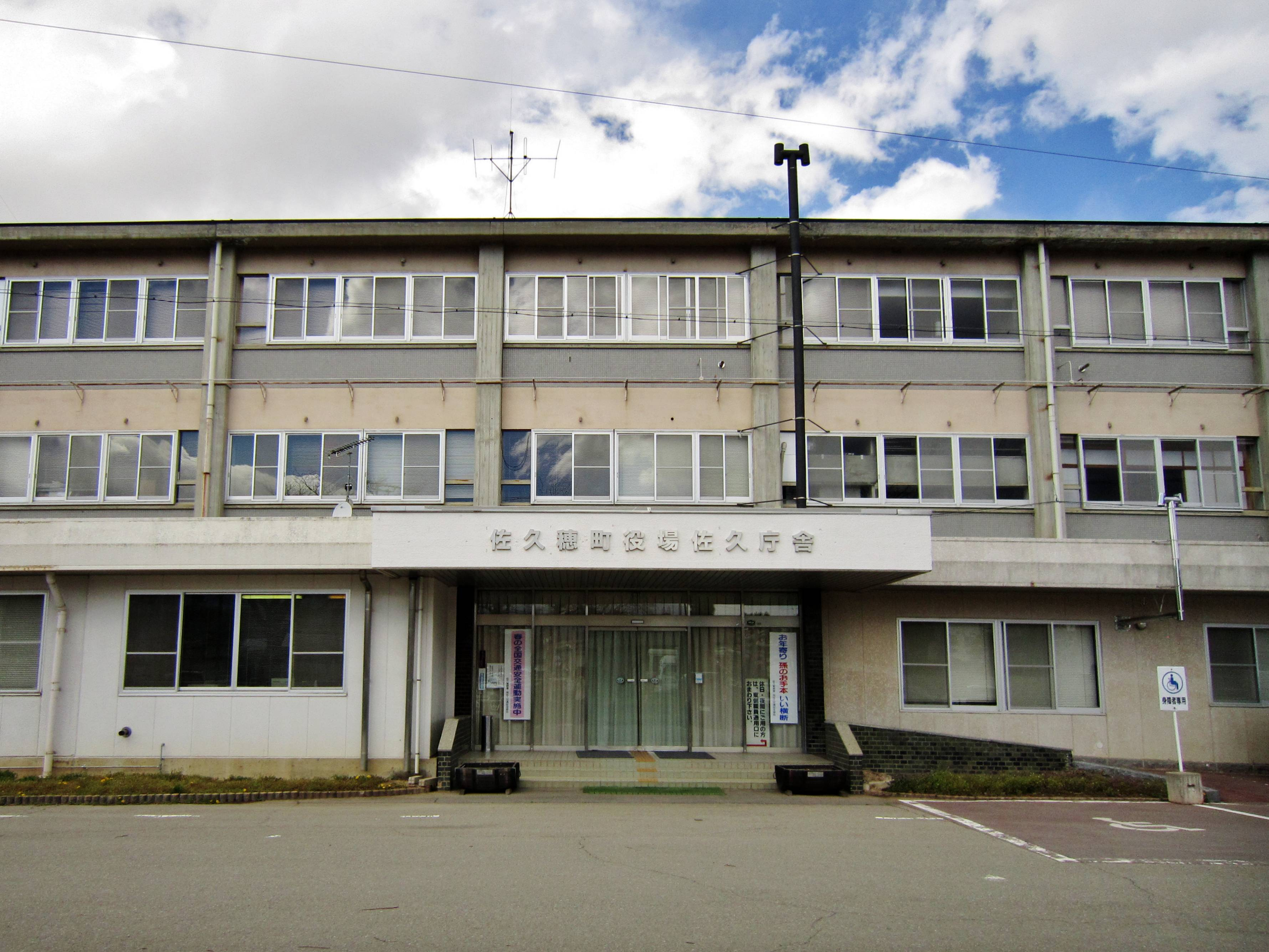
- Sakuho Town Hall

- Flag Seal

- Location of Sakuho in Nagano Prefecture

- Coordinates: 36°9′39.5″N 138°29′0.1″E
- Country: Japan
- Region: Chūbu (Kōshin'etsu)
- Prefecture: Nagano
- District: Minamisaku

Area
  - Total: 188.15 km^{2} (72.65 sq mi)

Population (April 2019)
  - Total: 11,076
  - Density: 58.868/km^{2} (152.47/sq mi)
- Time zone: UTC+9 (Japan Standard Time)
- Symbols
- Phone number: 0267-86-2525
- Address: 569 Takano-machi, Sakuho-machi, Minamisaku-gun, Nagano-ken 384-0697
- Website: http://www.town.sakuho.nagano.jp/

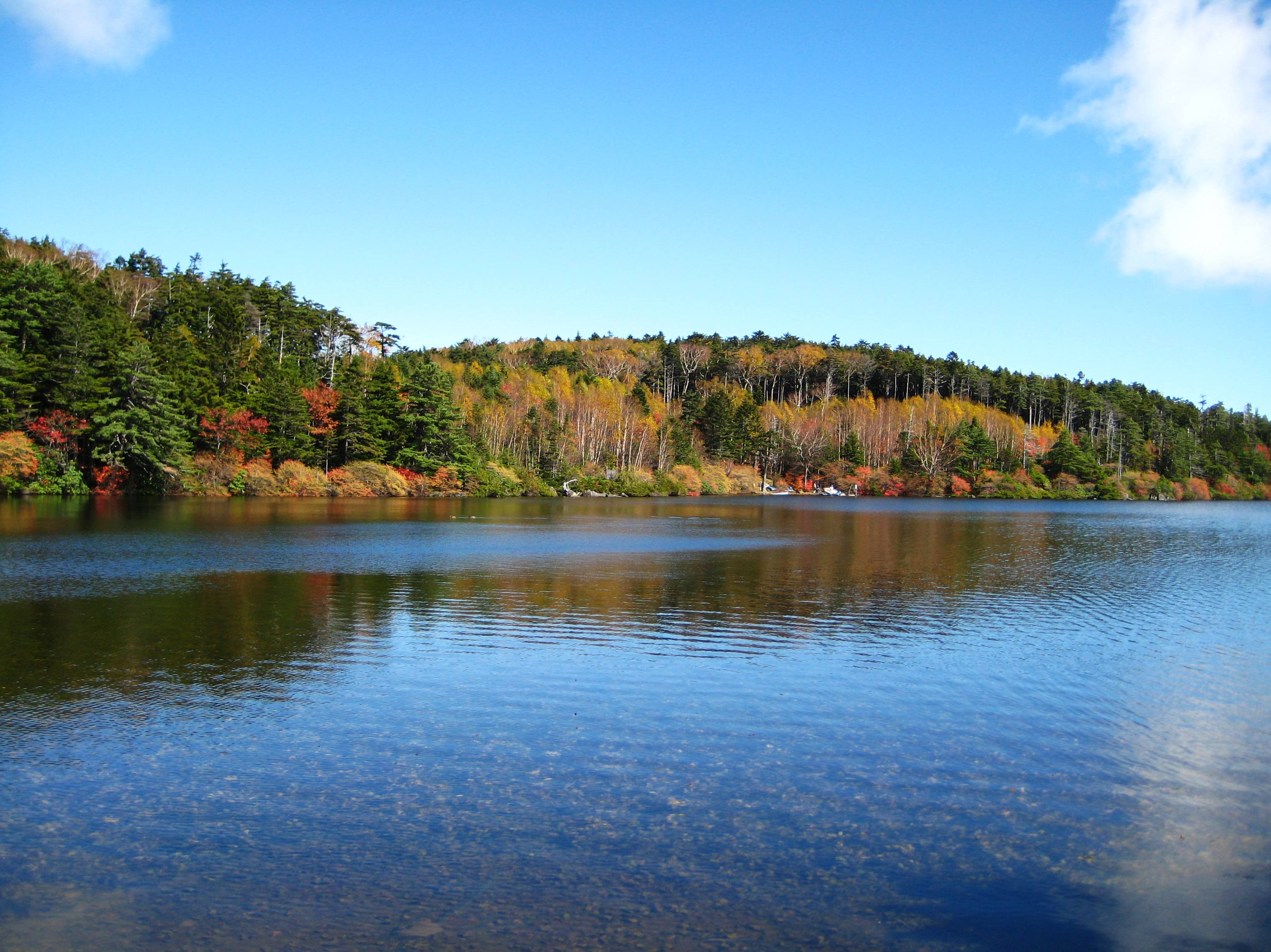
Shirakoma Pond in Sakuho

Sakuho (佐久穂町, Sakuho-machi) is a town located in Nagano Prefecture, Japan. As of 1 April 2019, the town had an estimated population of 11,076 in 4330 households, and a population density of 59 persons per km^{2}. The total area of the town is 188.15 square kilometres (72.65 sq mi).

== Geography ==
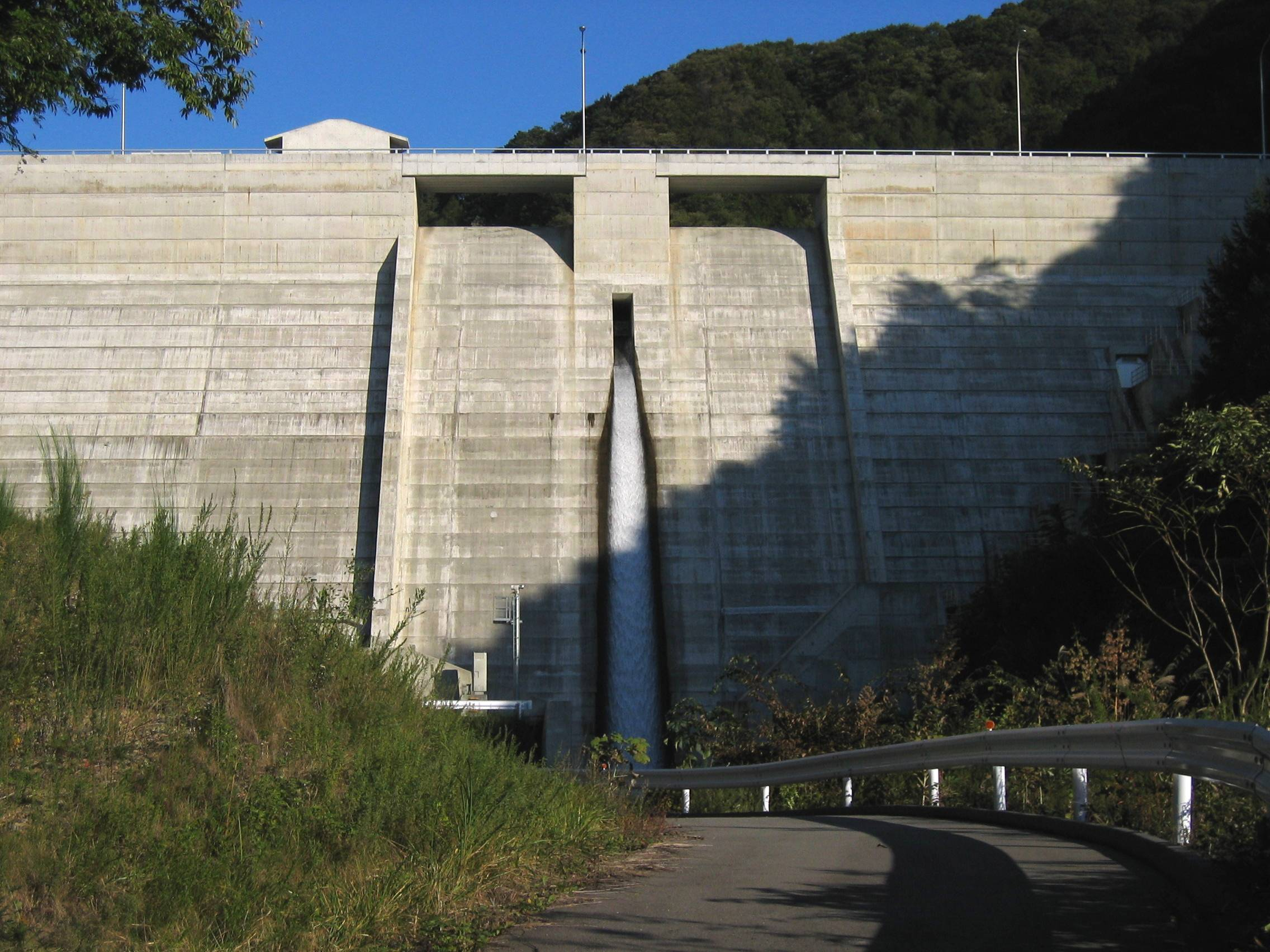
Yoji Dam in the town

Located in eastern Nagano prefecture, Sakuho stretches from west to east. It is situated in the Saku Basin, between the high peaks Mount Arafune and Mount Tateshina. The Shinano River flows through, and the mountainous parts of the town are located in the Yatsugatake-Chushin Kogen Quasi-National Park and the Myogi-Arafune-Saku Kogen Quasi-National Park.

- Mountains: Mount Morai
- Rivers: Chikuma River, Ōishi River, Nukui River
- Lakes: Futago Pond, Shirakoma Pond

=== Surrounding municipalities ===
- Gunma Prefecture
  - Nanmoku
  - Ueno
- Nagano Prefecture
  - Chino
  - Kitaaiki
  - Koumi
  - Saku

=== Climate ===
The town has a climate characterized by hot and humid summers, and cold winters (Köppen climate classification Cfa). The average annual temperature in Sakuho is 10.4 °C. The average annual rainfall is 1661 mm with September as the wettest month. The temperatures are highest on average in August, at around 23.4 °C, and lowest in January, at around -0.2 °C.

== Demographics ==
Per Japanese census data, the population of Sakuho has declined gradually over the past 50 years.

Historical population
Year	Pop.	±%
1960	17,267	—
1970	14,969	−13.3%
1980	14,228	−5.0%
1990	13,842	−2.7%
2000	13,622	−1.6%
2010	12,070	−11.4%
2020	10,218	−15.3%

== History ==
The area of present-day Sakuho was part of ancient Shinano Province. The villages of Kaisei and Sakai were created with the establishment of the modern municipalities system on April 1, 1889, merging to form the town of Sakuho on February 1, 1955. Sakuho was created by the merger of Saku and the village of Yachiho on March 20, 2005.

== Education ==
Sakuho has one public elementary school and one public middle school operated by the city government. The town does not have a high school.

== Transportation ==
=== Railway ===
- East Japan Railway Company - Koumi Line
  - Haguroshita - Aonuma - Usuda - Tatsuokajō

=== Highway ===
- National Route 141
- National Route 299

== Local attractions ==
- Togyū Okumura Memorial Museum
