= Kobuchizawa Station =

Railway station in Hokuto, Yamanashi Prefecture, Japan

CO51 Kobuchizawa Station 小淵沢駅
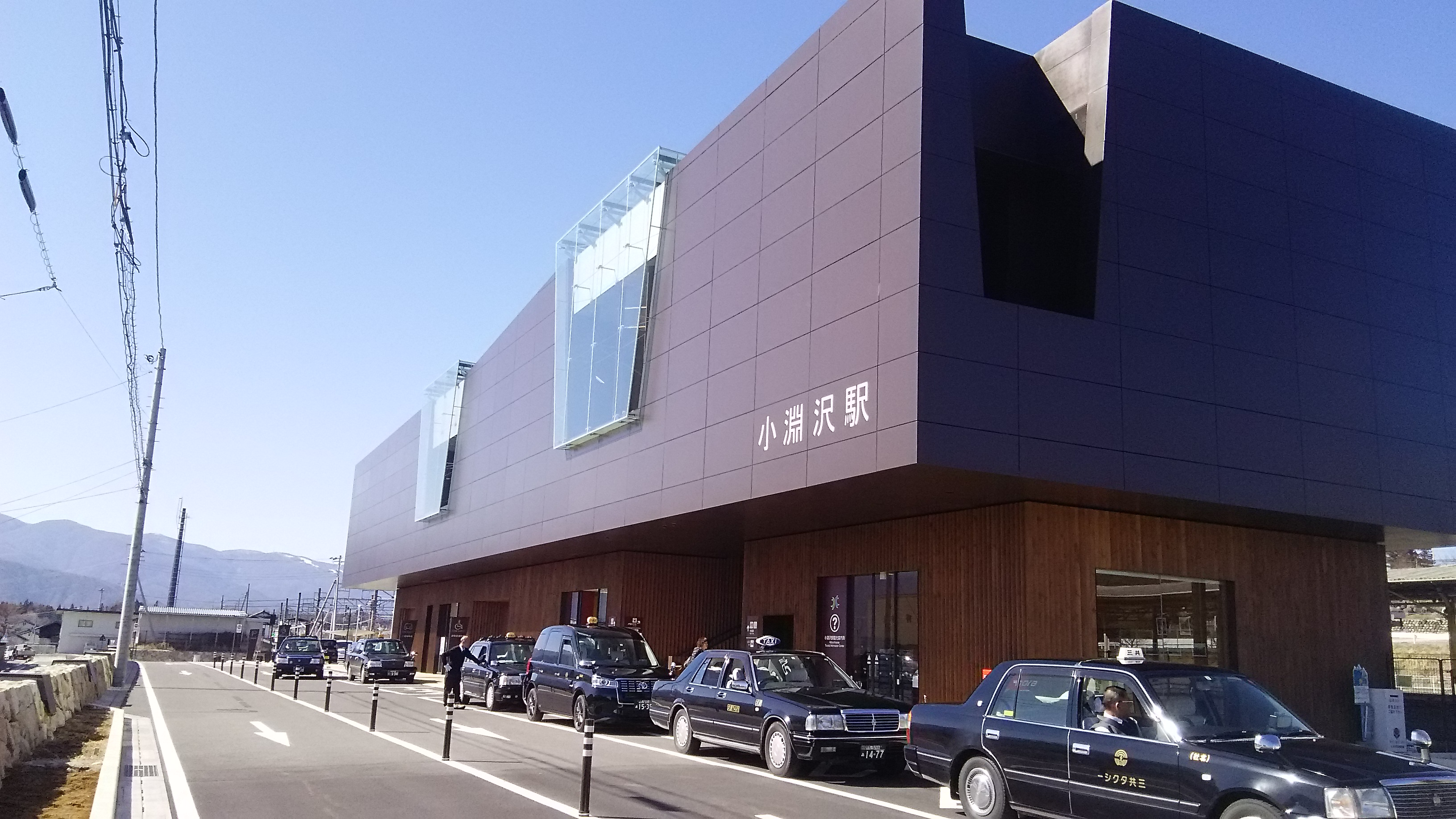
- Kobuchizawa Station in March 2018

General information
- Location: 1024 Kobuchizawa-cho, Hokuto-shi, Yamanashi-ken; Japan
- Coordinates: 35°51′49″N 138°19′01″E
- Operator: JR East
- Lines: ■ Chuo Main Line; ■ Koumi Line
- Distance: 173.7 kilometers from Tokyo
- Platforms: 2 island platforms
- Connections: Bus stop

Other information
- Status: Staffed ("Midori no Madoguchi")

History
- Opened: 21 December 1904; 121 years ago

Passengers
- FY2024: 2,802 (daily) ▲1.37%

Services
Preceding station	JR East	Following station
Fujimi CO53 towards Hakuba	Azusa	Nirasaki CO46 towards Chiba or Tokyo
Shinano-Sakai CO52 towards Shiojiri	Chūō Main Line Local	Nagasaka CO50 towards Tachikawa
Kai-Koizumi towards Komoro	Koumi Line	Terminus
Location
- Location within Yamanashi Prefecture Location within Japan

Kobuchizawa Station (小淵沢駅, Kobuchizawa-eki) is a railway station on the Chuo Main Line in Kobuchisawa in the city of Hokuto, Yamanashi Prefecture, Japan, operated by East Japan Railway Company (JR East).

== Lines ==
Kobuchizawa Station is served by the Chuo Main Line and is located 173.7 kilometers from the starting point of the line at Tokyo Station. It also forms the starting point of the rural Koumi Line to Komoro in Nagano Prefecture.

== Station layout ==
Kobuchizawa Station has two island platforms connected to a wooden station building by a footbridge. The station has a "Midori no Madoguchi" staffed ticket office.

=== Platforms ===
1	■ Chuo Main Line	for Kami-Suwa, Shiojiri, and Matsumoto
2	■ Chuo Main Line	for Kōfu, Hachiōji, and Shinjuku
4-5	■ Koumi Line	for Nobeyama, Sakudaira, and Komoro

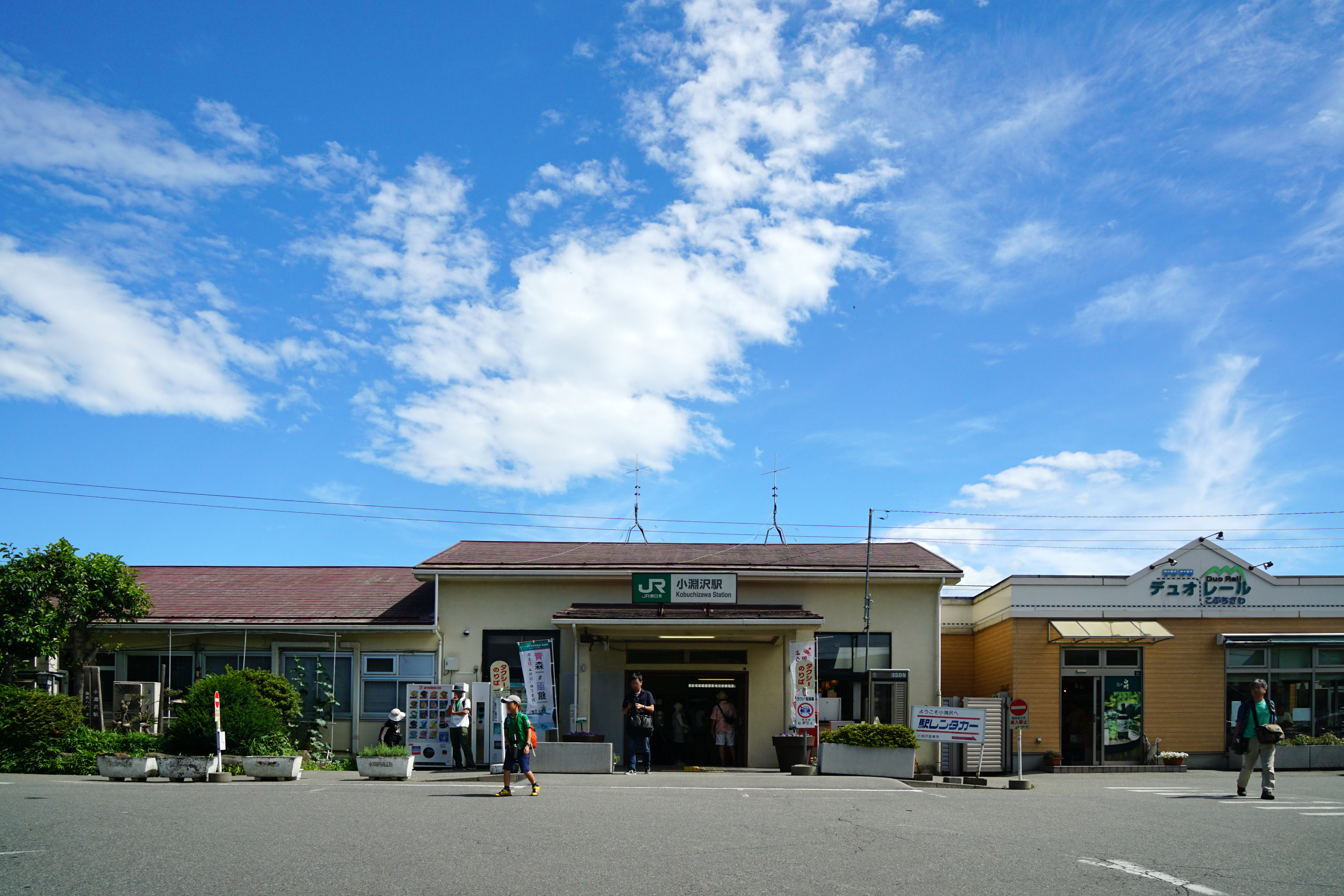
Kobuchizawa Station in July 2015

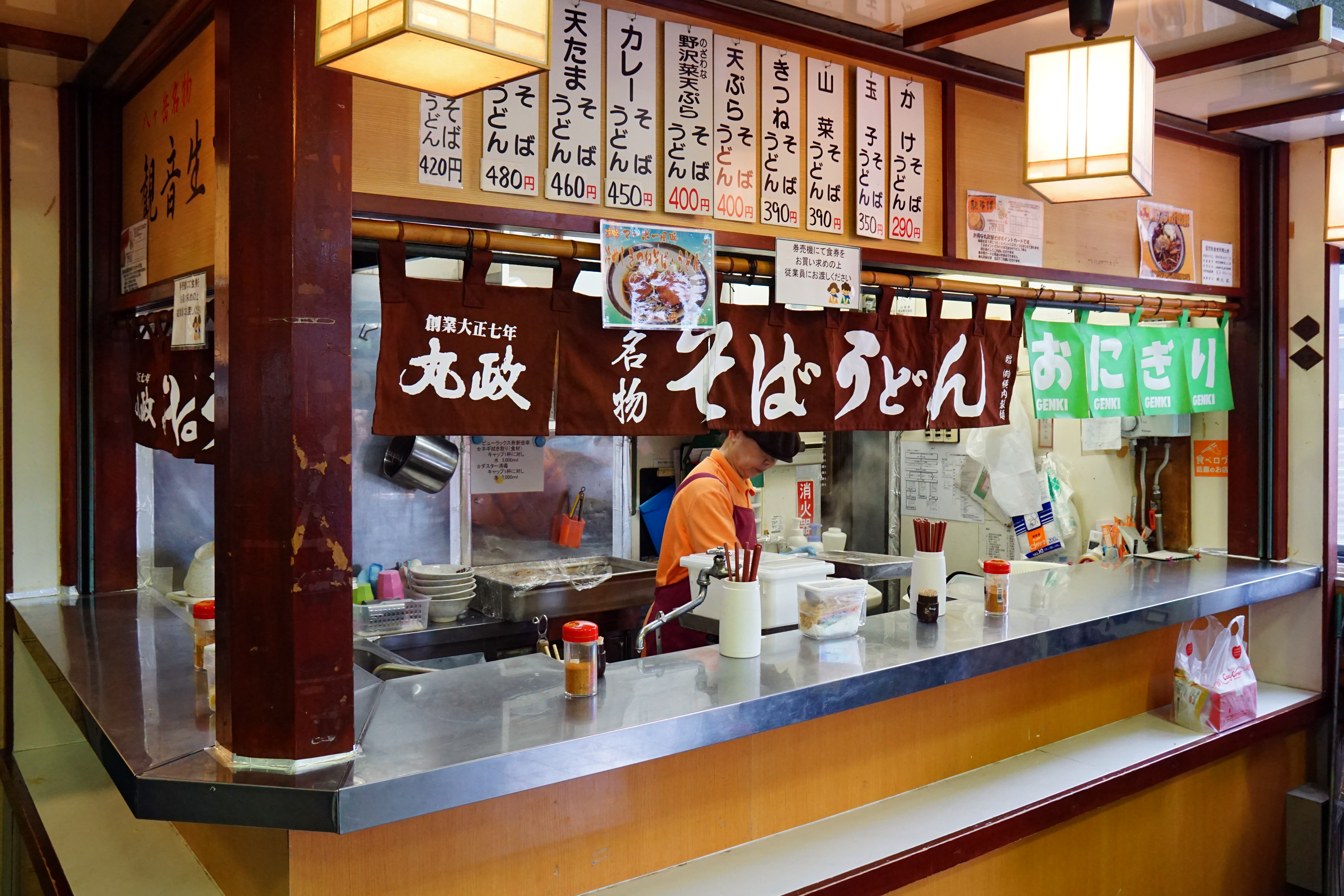
A soba and udon noodle stand inside the station in July 2015

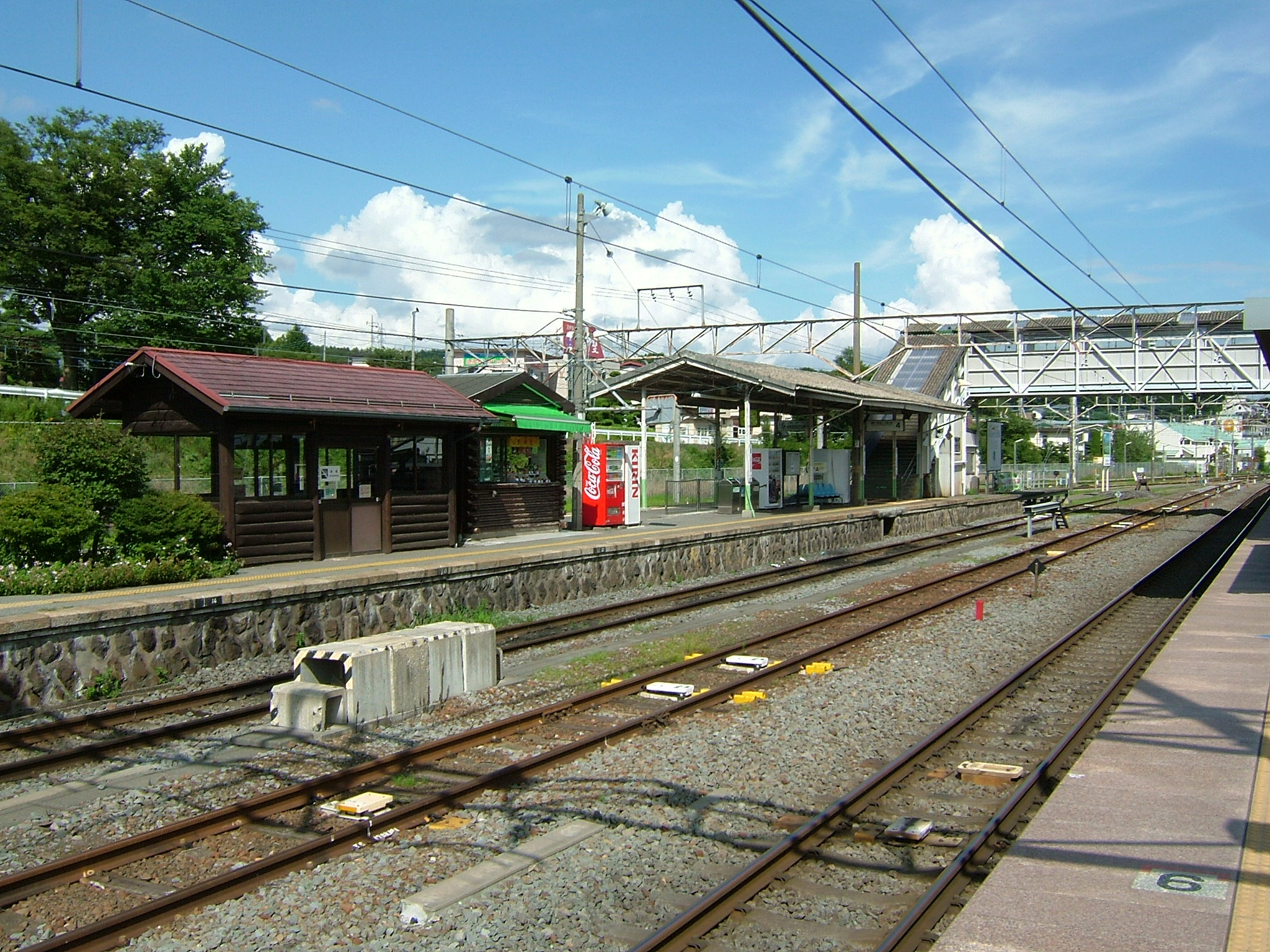
The Koumi Line platforms in August 2009

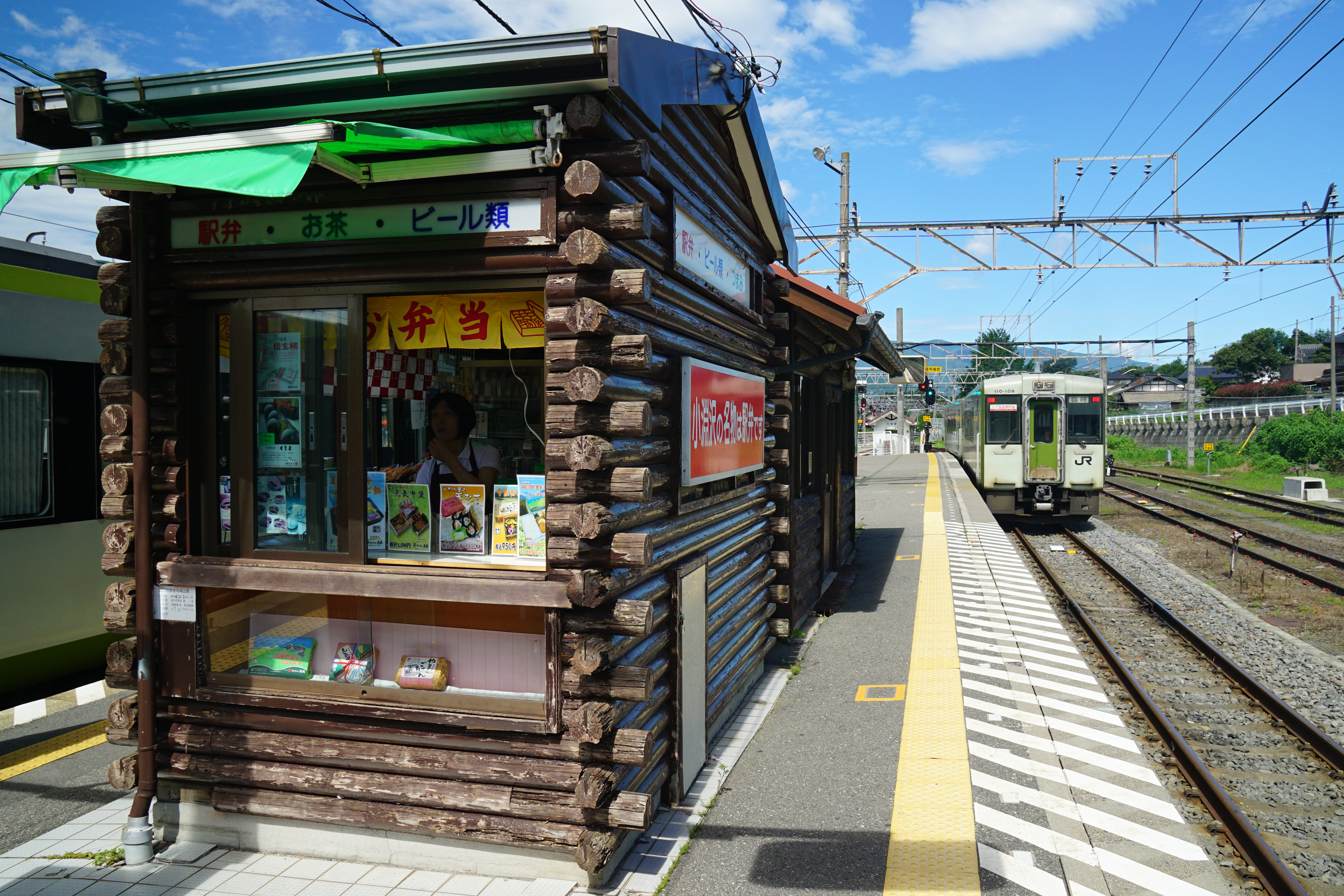
The ekiben kiosk on the Koumi Line platform in July 2015

== History ==
The station opened on December 21, 1904 as a station on the Japanese Government Railways (JGR). The Koumi Line began operations from the station on July 27, 1933. The JGR became the Japanese National Railways (JNR) after the end of World War II. With the dissolution and privatization of JNR on April 1, 1987, the station came under the control of the East Japan Railway Company (JR East).

The station has been rebuilt and opened in 2017, with the new structure, designed by architectural firm Atsushi Kitagawara Architects.

== Passenger statistics ==
In fiscal 2019, the station was used by an average of 1,486 passengers daily (boarding passengers only).

== Surrounding area ==
- Kobuchizawa Interchange on the Chuo Expressway
- Resort Outlets Yatsugatake shopping center
- Teikyo Daisan High School

== Famous Ekiben ==
- Awabi no takikomimeshi - abalone rice served inside a woven basket in the shape of a clamshell

== See also ==
- List of railway stations in Japan
