= Japan National Route 141 =

National highway in Japan

National Route 141
- 国道141号
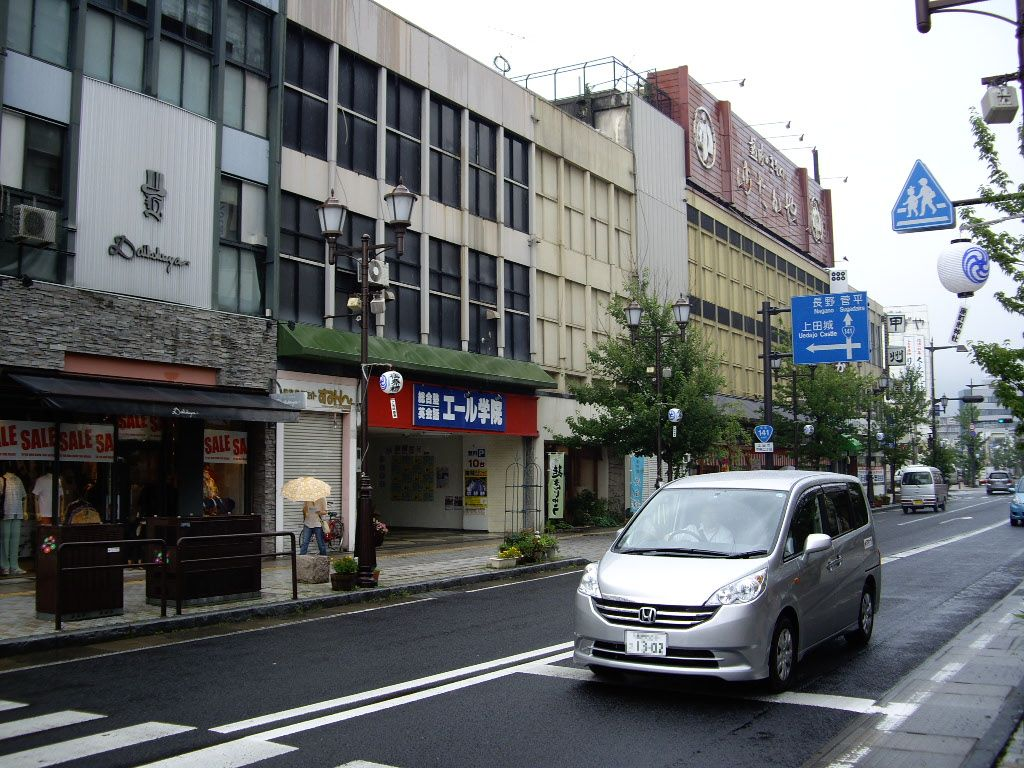

Route information
- Length: 104.9 km (65.2 mi)
- Existed: 1953–present

Major junctions
- South end: National Route 20 / Prefectural Route 6 in Nirasaki, Yamanashi
- North end: National Route 18 in Ueda, Nagano

Location
- Country: Japan

Highway system
- National highways of Japan; Expressways of Japan
← National Route 140	→ National Route 142

National Route 141 is a national highway of Japan connecting Nirasaki, Yamanashi and Ueda, Nagano in Japan, with a total length of 104.9 km (65.2 mi).

== History ==
When designated on 18 May 1953, Route 141 originally ran from Shimizu to Ueda. The section from Shimizu to Nirasaki was redesignated as Route 52 on 1 April 1963, shortening Route 141 to its current route.
