= Yato Castle =

Castle in Japan

- 谷戸城
- Hokuto, Yamanashi, Japan
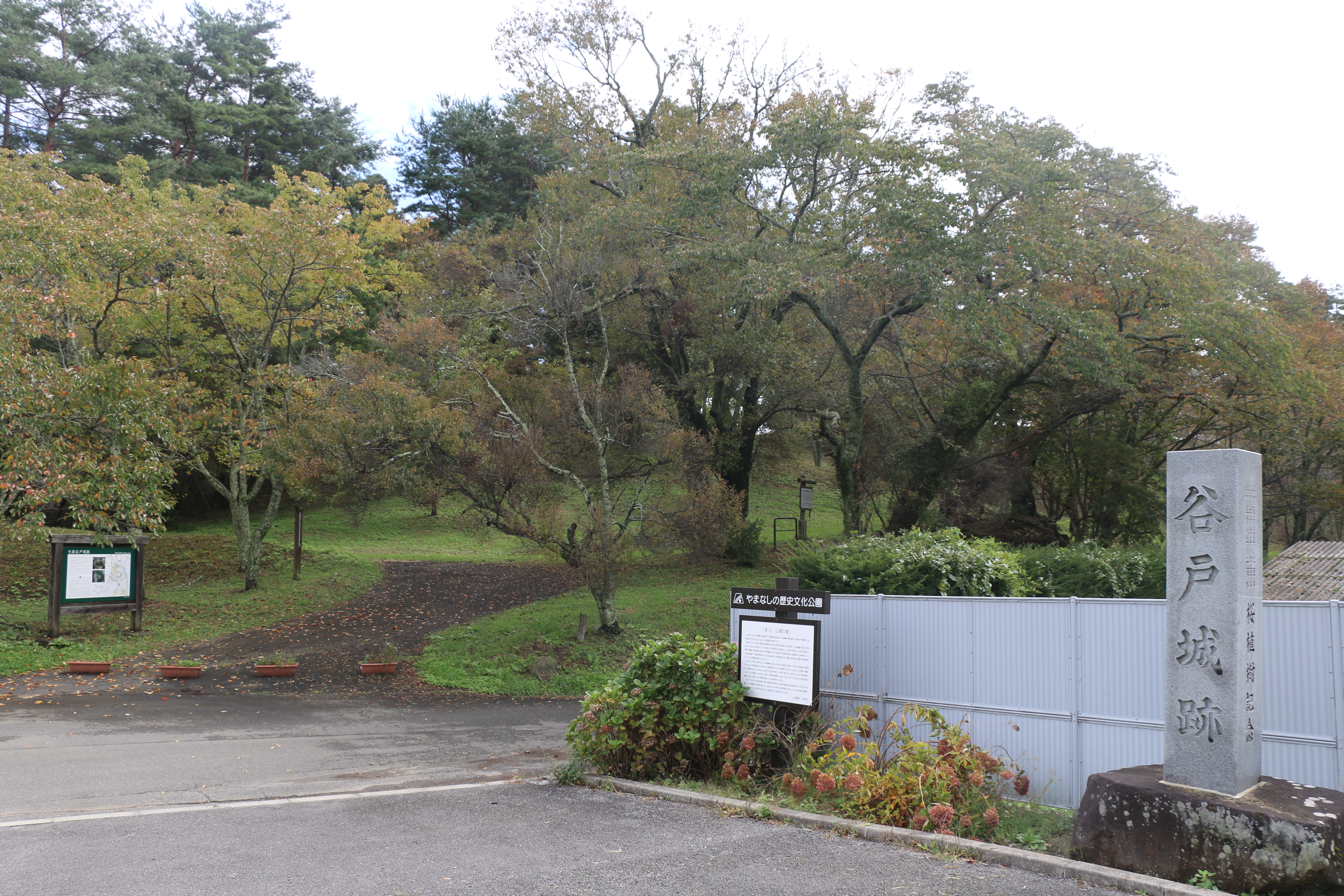
- Site of Yato Castle

Site information
- Type: yamashiro-style Japanese castle
- Controlled by: Takeda clan
- Condition: Ruins

Location
- Coordinates: 35°51′25″N 138°23′10″E

Site history
- Built: late Heian period
- Built by: Henmi Kiyomitsu
- In use: late Sengoku period

Yato Castle (谷戸城, Yato-jō) was a Heian period yamashiro-style Japanese castle located in the Ōizumi neighborhood of the city of Hokuto, Yamanashi prefecture, Japan. It was the primary fortress of the warlord Henmi Kiyomitsu, ancestor of the Takeda clan. The ruins have been protected as a National Historic Site since 1993.

== Overview ==
Yato Castle is located on a ridge extending from Mount Yatsugatake at an elevation of 850 meters. It was protected on three sides by steep cliffs, and to the east and west by rivers. As was typical for fortifications of the time, consisted of a series of enclosures protected by earthen ramparts with moats. The main enclosure is 90 meters east-to-west by 60 meters north-to-south, and inner moats can be seen on the north and east sides. In the case of Yata Castle, the design is unusual in that there is a large moat on the inside of the rampart, rather than outside. It is not known if the purpose of this moat was for drainage, or if it served a defensive purpose. There were many residential buildings with this enclosure, and the cornerstones of 23 buildings have been found, along with the remains of a garden with garden stone and a small blacksmith facility filled with burnt soil.

In the late Heian period, Minamoto no Yoshikiyo and his son, Kiyomitsu, were exiled to Kai Province from Hitachi Province. Yoshikiyo developed the area surrounding Yato castle as "Takeda shōen" and Kiyomitsu took the surname of "Henmi" after the location where he built a fortified residence, which was later called Yato Castle. He died at this castle in 1199, and his descendants became the Takeda clan, of which the famous Takeda Shingen was the 16th generation descendant of Kiyomitsu's younger son. Yato Castle disappears from historical records after Kiyomitsu's death; however, due to its strategic location on a road to Shinano Province, it is likely that some form of fortification survived. After the fall of the Takeda clan, the site was used by the forces of the Odawara Hōjō in their struggle for supremacy over the Tokugawa clan for the province. The remnants of a bailey with moats and earthen ramparts dates from this period.

The site was excavated by a Yamanashi University team in 1976, and again in 1982. Excavated relics include earthenware pottery that is thought to be used as lamps due to the adhesion of soot, glazed plates from Seto Mino, and Tenmoku tea bowls, Chinese celadon and white porcelain, as well as gun balls and sword fittings. A wide range of daily objects such as gold chopsticks, mallets, hair removers, tea mills, and metal farm tools as well as religious accessories have been excavated. In 2007, the Yato Castle Furusato History Hall (谷戸城ふるさと歴史館, Yatojō furusato rekishi-kan) was opened next to the site to display excavated artifacts.

The castle site is a 45 minute walk from Kai-Koizumi Station or a 60 minute walk from Nagasaka Station on the JR East Chūō Main Line.

== See also ==
- List of Historic Sites of Japan (Yamanashi)
