= Kinsei ruins =

Archaeological site in Ōizumi, Japan

- 金生遺跡 (Japanese)
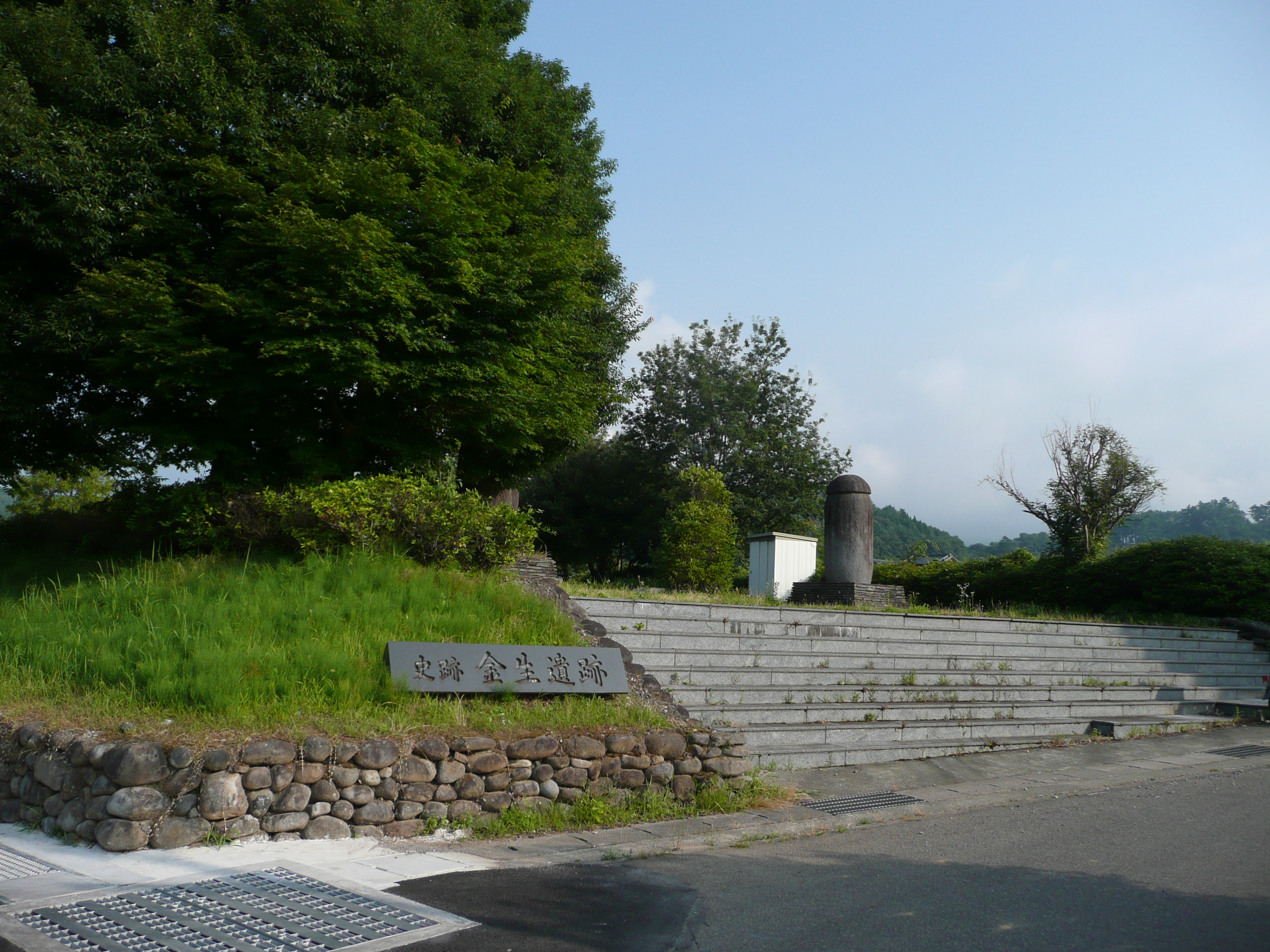
- Kinsei ruins

- Kinsei ruins Kinsei ruins (Japan)
- 35°50′54″N 138°23′07″E
- Periods: Jōmon period
- Location: Hokuto, Yamanashi, Japan
- Region: Chūbu region

Site notes
- Excavation dates: 1980
- Public access: Yes (archaeological park)

The Kinsei site (金生遺跡, Kinsei iseki) is an archaeological site consisting of the ruins of a late to final Jōmon period settlement, located in the Ōizumi neighborhood of the city of Hokuto, Yamanashi in the Chūbu region of Japan. The site was designated a National Historic Site of Japan in 1983.

== Overview ==
The Kinsei site is located on a ridge near the middle of the southern foot of Mount Yatsugatake at an elevation of 770 meters. The foot of Mount Yatsugatake is an area where many sites from the Jōmon period are densely distributed; however, by the late Jōmon period, the cooling climate made much of this region less attractive for settlement, and the Kinsei site is one of the largest which has been excavated from this period. The primary excavation took place in 1980.

The site consists of two separate areas. In Site A to the north, the foundations of 41 pit dwellings were discovered, 38 of which are from the final period of the Jōmon period (1000–300 BCE). In addition, Jōmon pottery shards, stone tools, containers and tools made from bone were found from both within and outside of these building foundations. The site also included a ritual area with stone circles, which also contained ritual objects (included over 200 human-shaped clay figurines), clay earrings, and human and animal bone fragments. The presence of 138 lower jaws from wild boar indicates that these animals were used as some form of animal sacrifice, perhaps similar to the iomante ceremony conducted by the Ainu people with black bears. As many of these boar mandibles came from juvenile animals, the site has also attracting attention as a possible indication that wild boars may have been bred as domesticated animals during the Jōmon period.

From Site B district to the south, more than ten buildings with pillar hole rows, surrounded by a moat were discovered. The site included a water reservoir and 49 underground structures, most of which were probably tombs, but some of which may have been prehistoric storage pits. Excavated artifacts included earthenware, stone products, and other items, including items made of materials originating from distant areas of Japan. Site B appears to have been inhabited into the Edo period, as the foundations of dwellings from the 16th and 17th centuries have been found in the upper strata.

The site is now preserved as an archaeological park by the city of Hokuto with some faux reconstructed buildings. The excavated items can be seen at the Yamanashi Prefectural Archaeological Museum (山梨県立考古博物館, Yamanashi kenritsu kōkohakubutsukan) in Kōfu. The site is located about 10 minutes by car from Nagasaka Station on the JR Tōkai Chūō Main Line.

== Gallery ==
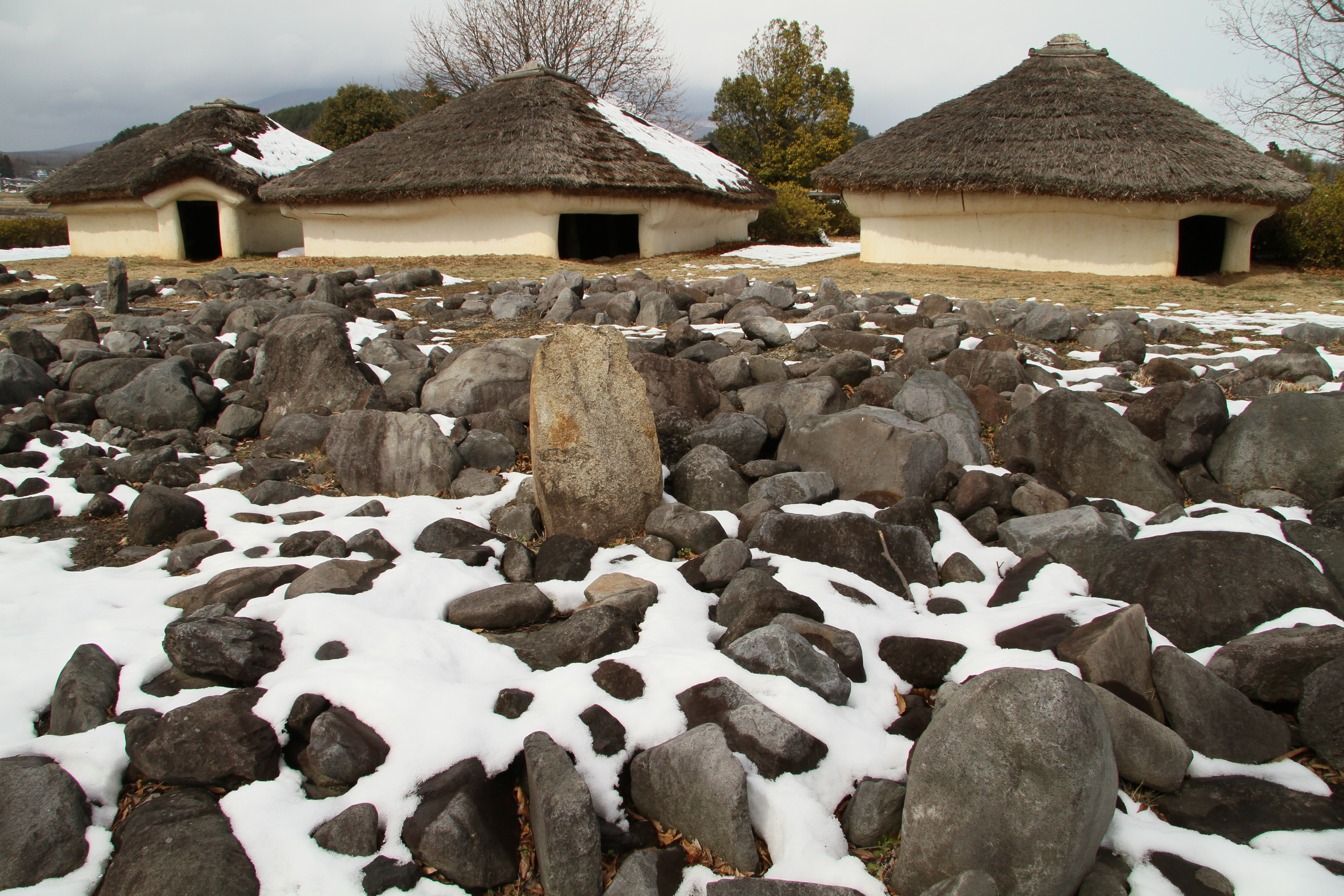
Restored House and Stone Circles

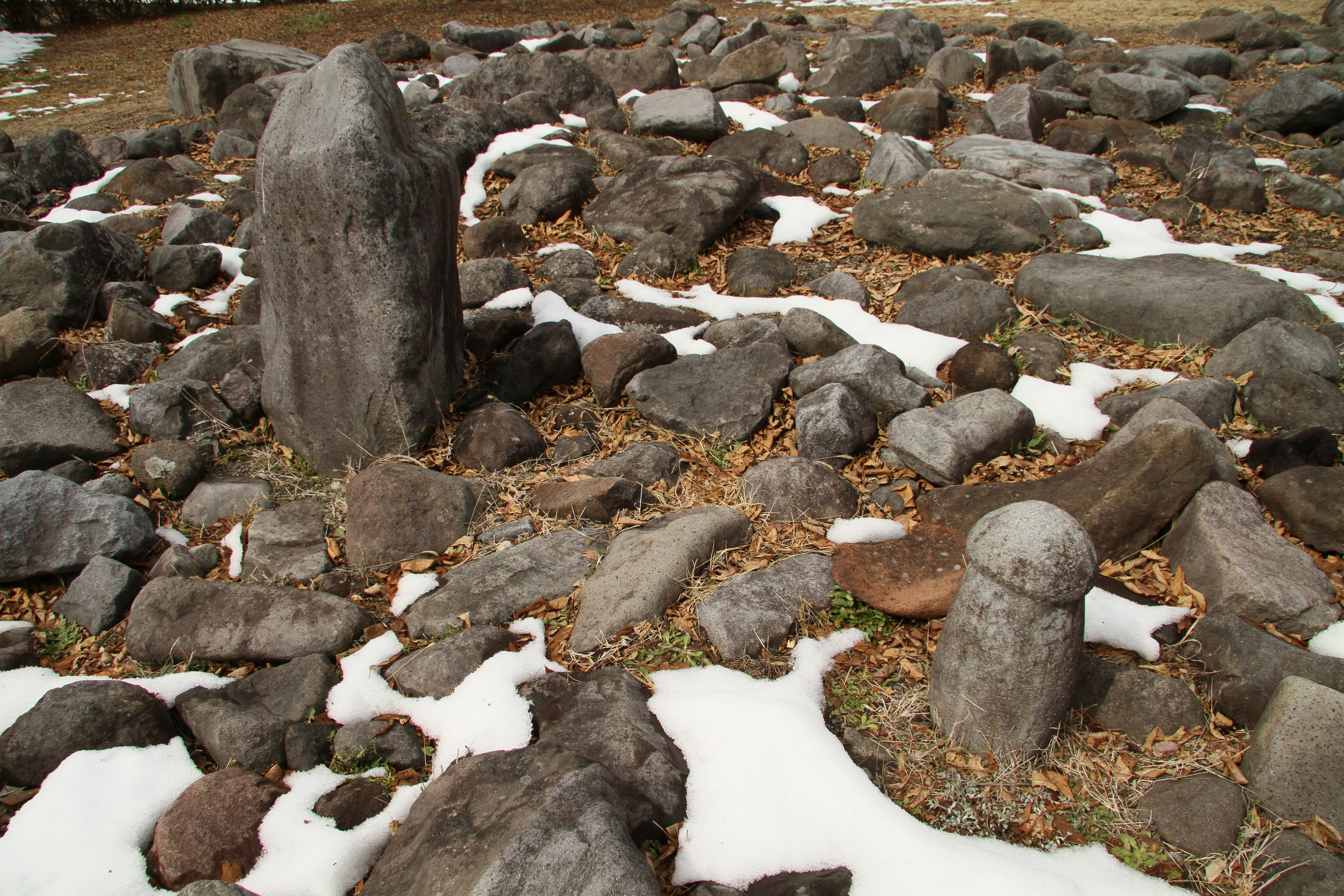
Stone Circles

== See also ==
- List of Historic Sites of Japan (Yamanashi)
