= Hinoharu Station =

Railway station in Hokuto, Yamanashi Prefecture, Japan

CO49 Hinoharu Station 日野春駅
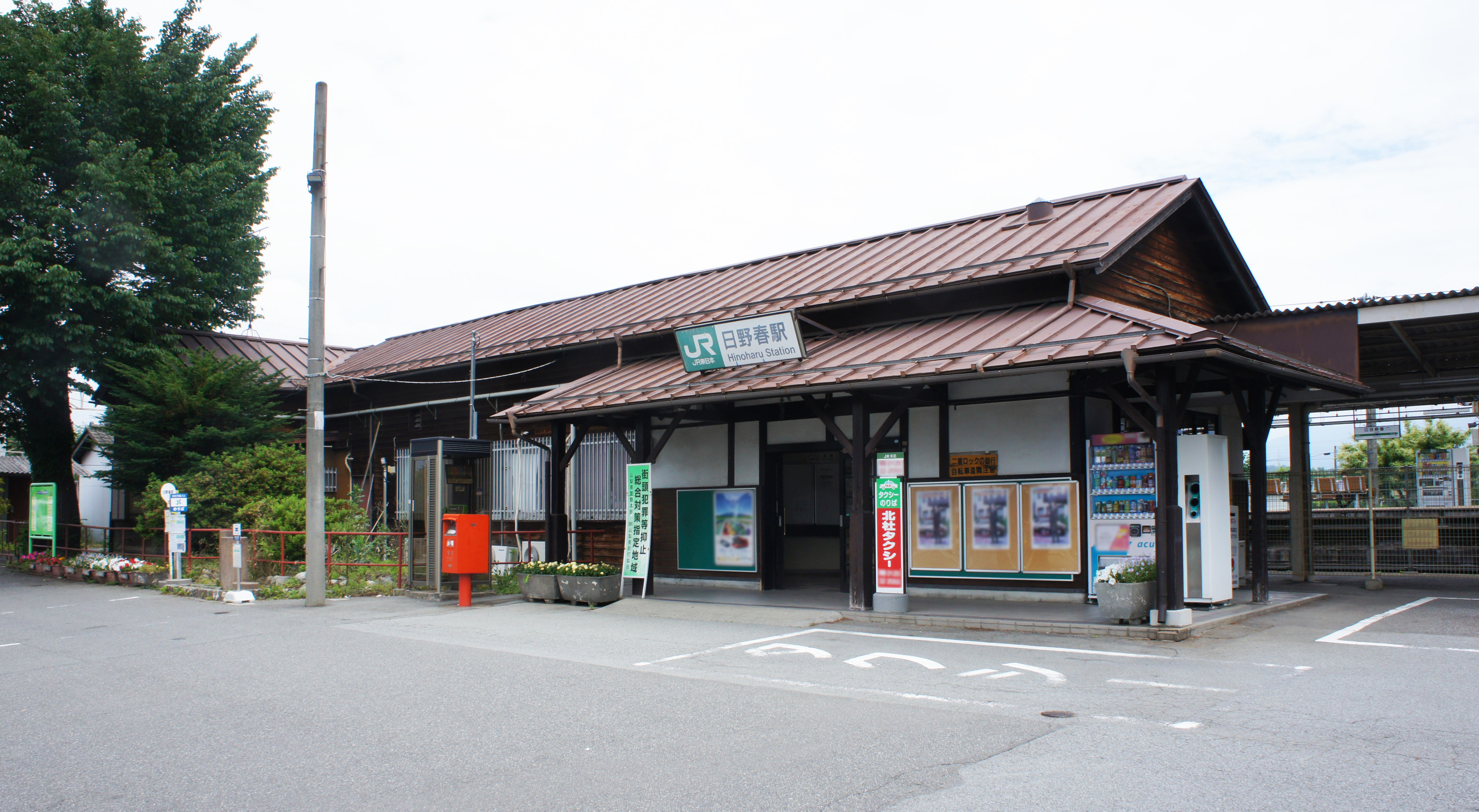
- Hinoharu Station, June 2021

General information
- Location: 50, Nagasaka-cho Tomioka, Hokuto-shi, Yamanashi-ken; Japan
- Coordinates: 35°47′24″N 138°23′41″E
- Operator: JR East
- Line: ■ Chūō Main Line
- Distance: 160.1 km from Tokyo
- Platforms: 1 side + 1 island platform
- Tracks: 3

Other information
- Status: Staffed
- Website: Official website

History
- Opened: December 21, 1904

Passengers
- FY2024: 950 (daily) ▲5.79%

Services
Preceding station	JR East	Following station
Nagasaka CO50 towards Shiojiri	Chūō Main Line Local	Anayama CO48 towards Tachikawa
Location
- Location within Yamanashi Prefecture Location within Japan

Hinoharu Station (日野春駅, Hinoharu-eki) is a railway station of Chūō Main Line, East Japan Railway Company (JR East) in Nagasaka, in the city of Hokuto, Yamanashi Prefecture, Japan.

== Lines ==
Hinoharu Station is served by the Chūō Main Line, and is 160.1 kilometers from the terminus of the line at Tokyo Station.

== Station layout ==
The station consists of one ground level side platform and one ground level island platform, connected to the wooden station building by a footbridge. The station is staffed.

=== Platforms ===
1, 2	■ Chūō Main Line	for Kobuchizawa, Shiojiri and Matsumoto
3	■ Chūō Main Line	for Kōfu

== History ==
Hinoharu Station opened on December 21, 1904 a station on the Japanese Government Railways (JGR) Chūō Main Line. The station was built as a watering point for steam locomotives, which were still used on the line until August 1964. A freshwater spring, called the Hino spring, occupied this location, and was a noted local landmark due to an ancient pine tree from which local legend stated that Takeda Shingen once hung his battle standard. When the government appropriated the land for the station, the local landowner insisted that the tree be spared. However, through neglect and due to smoke from the locomotives, the pine tree died in 1914. Descendants of the owner sued the Railroad Ministry in 1917, and won the case in 1919. A monument was erected in front of the station on the location of the pine tree in 1933 to commemorate the incident. The JGR became the JNR (Japanese National Railways) after the end of World War II. Scheduled freight services were discontinued from February 1972. With the dissolution and privatization of the JNR on April 1, 1987, the station came under the control of the East Japan Railway Company.

== Passenger statistics ==
In fiscal 2017, the station was used by an average of 590 passengers daily (boarding passengers only).

== Surrounding area ==
- Hinoharu post office

== See also ==
- List of railway stations in Japan
