= Umenoki ruins =

- 梅之木遺跡 (Japanese)
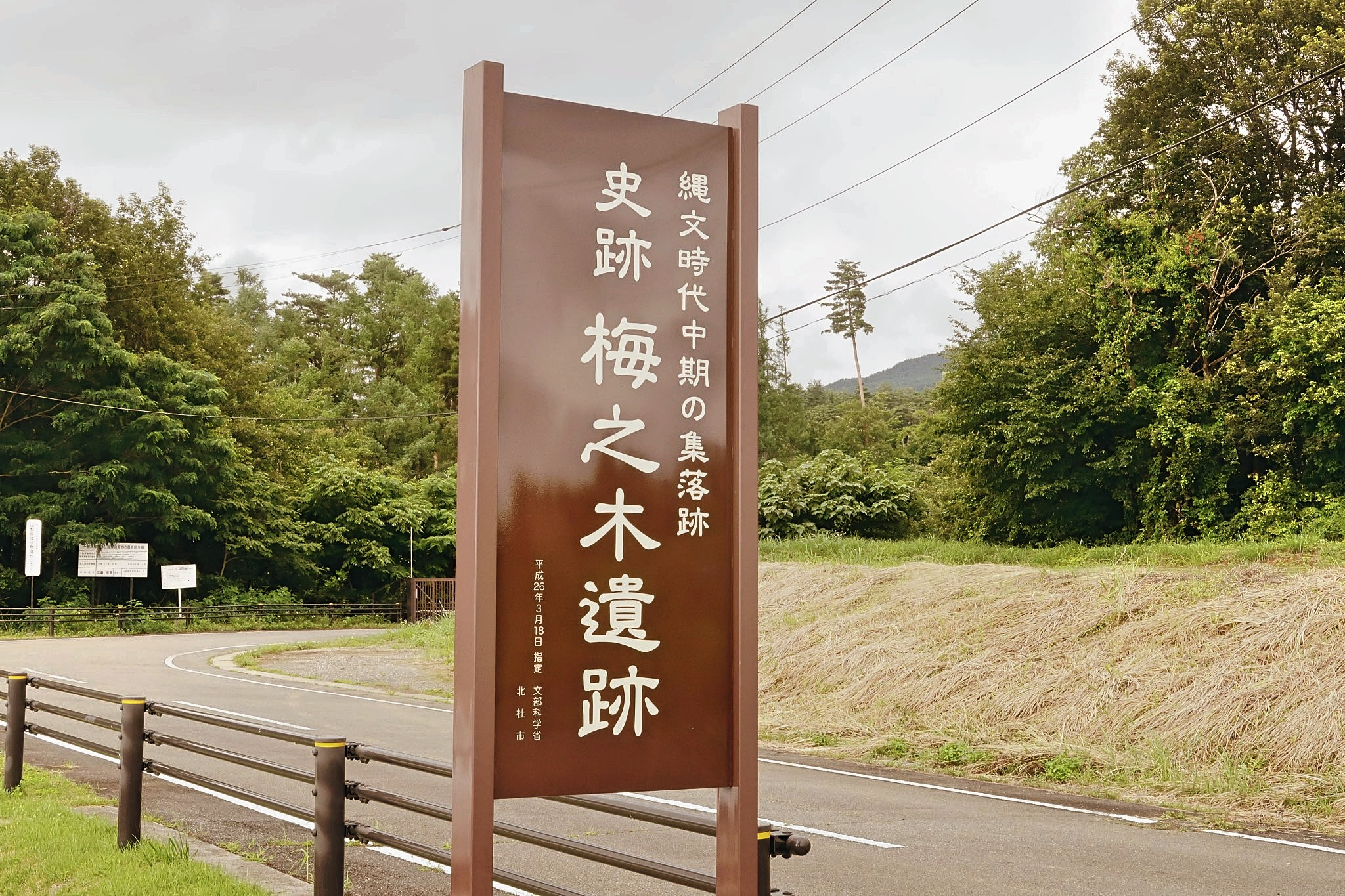
- Umenoki ruins entrance

- Location in Yamanashi Location in Japan
- 35°47′22″N 138°27′48″E
- Periods: Jōmon period
- Location: Hokuto, Yamanashi, Japan
- Region: Chūbu region

Site notes
- Public access: yes (archaeological park)

The Umenoki ruins (梅之木遺跡, Umenoki iseki) is an archaeological site consisting of the ruins of middle Jōmon period settlement, located in what is now part of the city of Hokuto, Yamanashi in the Chūbu region of Japan. The site was designated a National Historic Site of Japan in 2014.

== Overview ==
The Umenoki site is located on the eastern end of the southern foot of Mount Yatsugatake on a gentle slope facing west at an elevation of 770 to 790 metres (2,530 to 2,590 ft), on the left bank of the Yuzawa River. In this region, the density of middle Jōmon period ruins is very great, at about three to five kilometer intervals on river terraces of the Yuzawa River, connected by traces of a road, and with remnants related to cultivated areas in side valleys. The Umenoki ruins consist of the traces of a village with up to 150 dwellings surrounding an elliptical central plaza with dimensions of 60 meters north-to-south by 20 meters east-to-west. The village consisted of pit dwellings from the middle to the end of the Jōmon period (About 5000 to 4500 years ago). These structures are assumed to have had conical roofs, and were five to seven meters in diameter. Many artifacts of Jōmon pottery and stone tools were also excavated from the site.

The site is now preserved as the Umenoki Archaeological Park by the city of Hokuto with a small museum and where volunteers have recreated some faux pit house reconstructions. The site if located about 20 minutes by car from Anayama Station or 30 minutes by car from Nagasaka Station on the JR East Chūō Main Line.

== See also ==
- List of Historic Sites of Japan (Yamanashi)
