= Kai-Ōizumi Station =

Railway station in Hokuto, Yamanashi Prefecture, Japan

Kai-Ōizumi Station 甲斐大泉駅
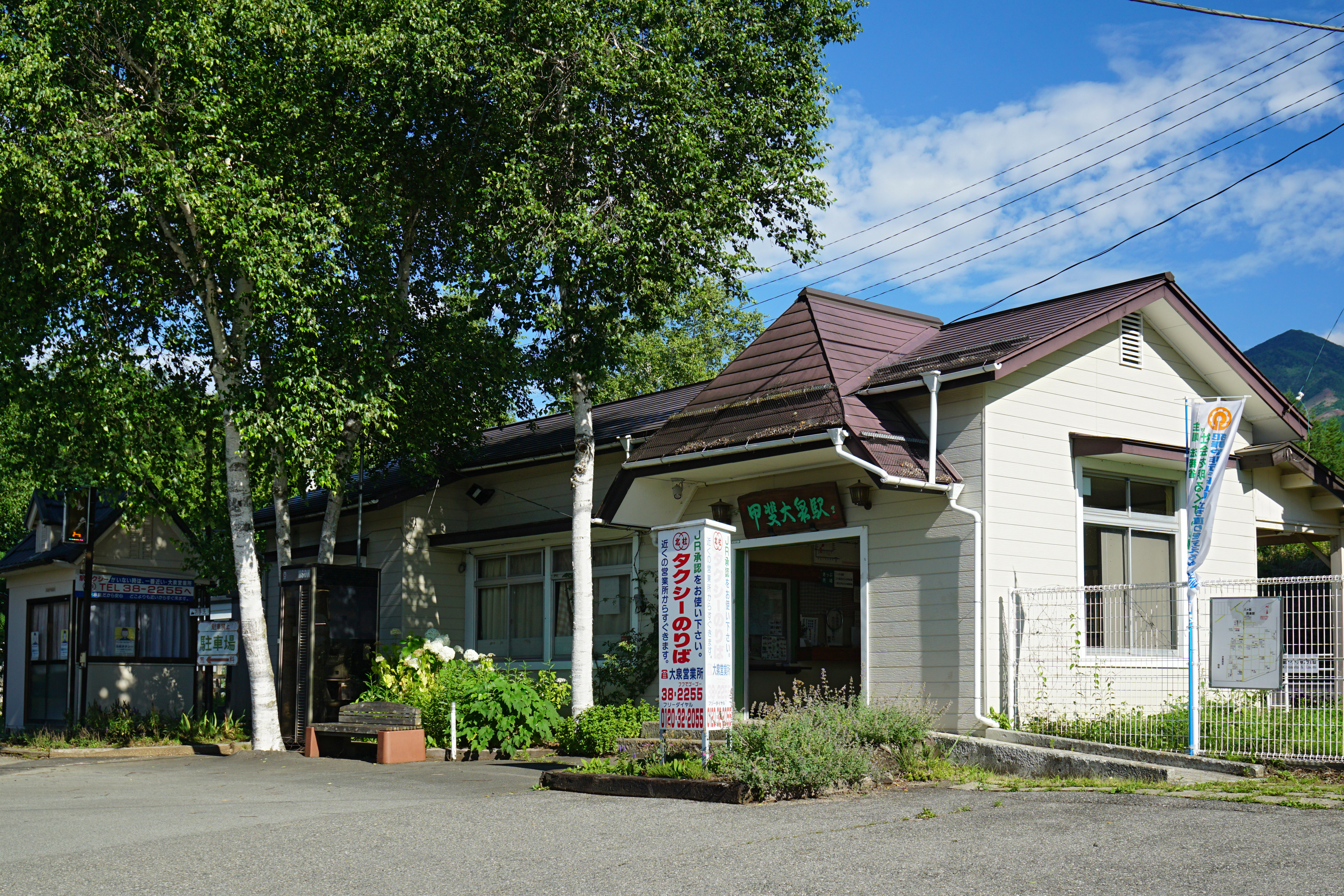
- Kai-Ōizumi Station in July 2015

General information
- Location: 8241 Nishiide, Ōizumi-cho, Hokuto-shi, Yamanashi-ken 409-1501; Japan
- Coordinates: 35.8962°N 138.4096°E
- Elevation: 1,158 m (3,799 ft)
- Operator: JR East
- Line: ■ Koumi Line
- Distance: 12.2 km from Kobuchizawa
- Platforms: 2 side platforms

Other information
- Status: Staffed (Midori no Madoguchi)
- Website: Official website

History
- Opened: 29 July 1933

Passengers
- FY2015: 74 daily

Services
Preceding station	JR East	Following station
Kiyosato towards Komoro	Koumi Line	Kai-Koizumi towards Kobuchizawa
Location
- Location within Yamanashi Prefecture Location within Japan

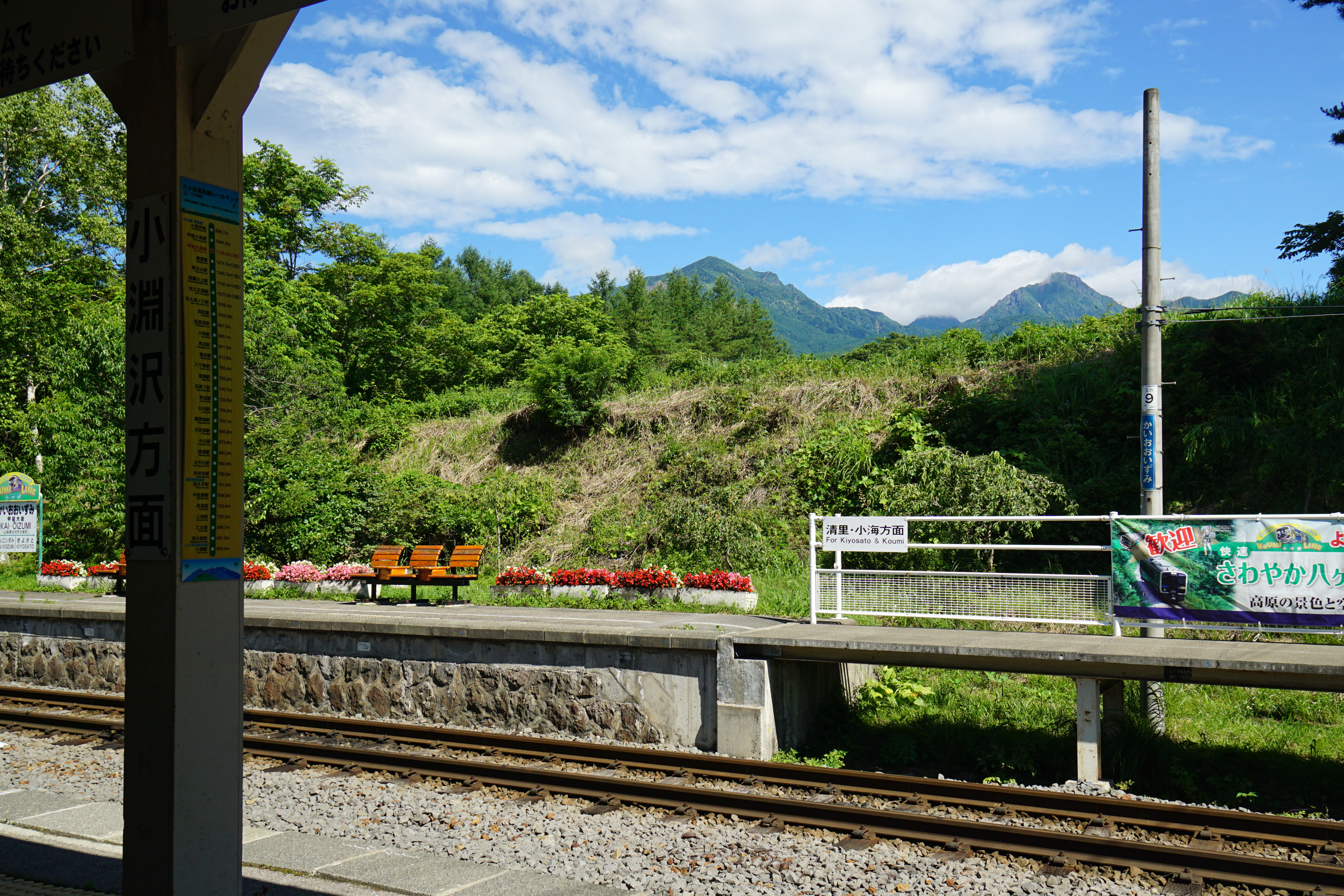
Platform

Kai-Ōizumi Station (甲斐大泉駅, Kai-Ōizumi-eki) is a railway station in Ōizumi-Nishiide in the city of Hokuto, Yamanashi Prefecture, Japan. With an elevation of 1,274 m (4,180 ft) on the southern slopes of Mount Yatsugatake, Kai-Ōizumi Station is the third highest station on the JR East rail network.

== Lines ==
Kai-Ōizumi Station is served by the Koumi Line and is 12.2 kilometers from the terminus of the line at Kobuchizawa Station.

== Station layout ==
The station consists of two ground-level opposed side platforms, connected by a level crossing. The station has a Midori no Madoguchi staffed ticket office.

=== Platforms ===
station side	■ Koumi Line	for Kobuchizawa
opposite side	■ Koumi Line	for Koumi and Komoro

== History ==
Kai-Ōizumi Station was opened on 27 July 1933 by the Japanese Government Railways. With the privatization of Japanese National Railways (JNR) on 1 April 1987, the station came under the control of JR East.

== Passenger statistics ==
In fiscal 2015, the station was used by an average of 74 passengers daily (boarding passengers only).

== Surrounding area ==
- Ōizumi Post Office
- Ōizumi Onsen
- Seicho-no-Ie International Headquarters

== See also ==
- List of railway stations in Japan
