= Ōizumi =

Ōizumi may refer to:

- Ōizumi, Gunma, a town located in Gunma Prefecture, Japan
- Ōizumi, Yamanashi, a village located in Kitakoma District, Japan
- Yo Oizumi, Japanese TV personality and a stage actor
