= Streptomyces hokutonensis =

Scientific classification
- Domain: Bacteria
- Kingdom: Bacillati
- Phylum: Actinomycetota
- Class: Actinomycetia
- Order: Streptomycetales
- Family: Streptomycetaceae
- Genus: Streptomyces
- Species: S. hokutonensis

Binomial name
- Streptomyces hokutonensis Yamamura et al. 2014

Type strain
- KCTC 29186, NBRC 108812, R1-NS-10

Species of bacterium

Streptomyces hokutonensis is a bacterium species from the genus of Streptomyces which has been isolated from rhizosphere roots from strawberries in Hokuto, Yamanashi in Japan.

== See also ==
- List of Streptomyces species
