= Gikosan Yanodo Temple =

Buddhist temple in Yamanashi, Japan

Gikousan Yanodo 義光山矢の堂
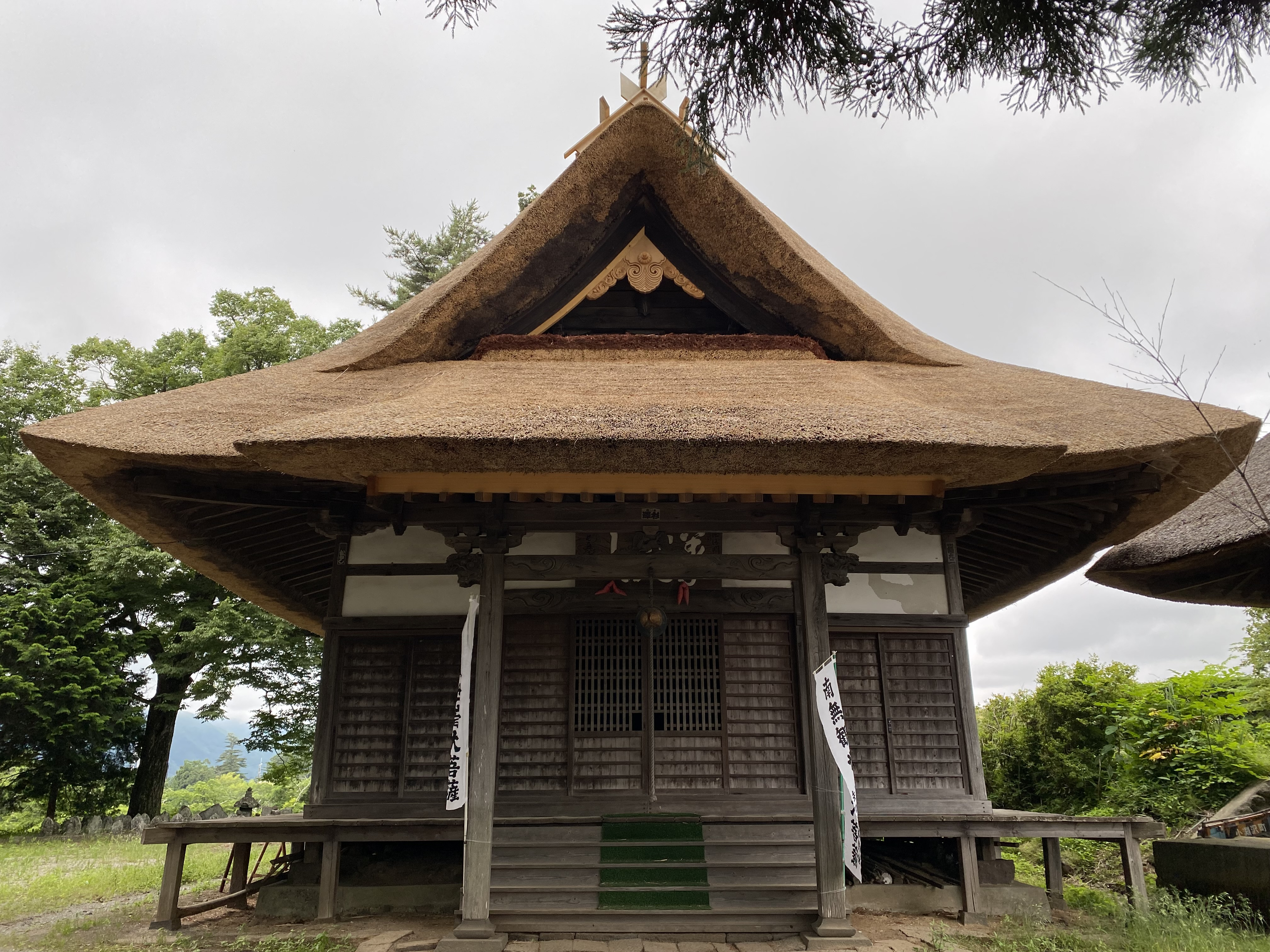

- Location within Japan

Religion
- Affiliation: Buddhist
- Deity: Guanyin 観世音菩薩

Location
- Location: 2139 Kobuchisawa-machi, Hokuto-shi, Yamanashi-ken, 408-0044 Japan
- Country: Japan
- Interactive map of Gikousan Yanodo 義光山矢の堂
- Coordinates: 35°51′45.8″N 138°18′40.7″E

Architecture
- Completed: 1781

Boasting three tangible cultural properties of the city- “Hall, Hokyointo pagoda and Japanese Drum”, Gikosan (Mount Giko) Yanodo Temple, hereinafter called “Yanodo” shows its presence today in the local community and visitors from here and there, locating in Kobuchisawa-cho, Hokuto City, Yamanashi Prefecture, Japan. The object of worship is the Guanyin, and every in May, about 10 Buddhist monks are invited inside the hall to chant Daihannyakyo Sutra (Great Perfection of Wisdom Sutra) as an annual event.

== History ==
It is said to have originated when military commander Shinra Sabro Yoshimitsu (1045–1127) solicited Mitsui Temple at Otsu, now in Shiga-ken, to move a statue of the Guanyin (Yano Kannon) carved by a holy priest called Kukai Shonin himself to then Kobuchisawa-mura and built a hall, accordingly it called "Yanodo”.

Yoshimitsu's grandson, Kiyomitsu Kurogenta, settled in Hemi and founded a temple in Tonohira, Kobuchisawa-mura, and made Kobuchisan Tentakuji Temple the head of a temple serving temporarily as Yanodo. According to the history of Shokyuji Temple located currently in Kobuchisawa-cho, this was the period of 1166–1168.

Takeda Shingen (1521–1573) who was competent warlord in the late stage of the Sengoku period had been venerating Yanodo associated with the Kai Genji clan and enshrined the Yano Kannon put in the place named "Dodaira" located halfway up Mt. Yatsugatake because he won the battle of Daimon Pass with this blessing, and hence called it "Kannondaira" plateau.

After the fall of the Takeda clan, "Kannondaira" in the deep mountains was devastated, and the villagers, thinking that they could not abandon the Yano Kannon with its great miraculous power, moved it back to Tentakuji Temple, but later, when the said Temple was deteriorated, it was enshrined for some time at Shokyuji Temple which took a role of the head of a temple serving temporarily as Yanodo.

The history of the above can be found in the book of "Daihannyakyo Sutra Kanka Bo" complied in 1820. It is said that the Jokoji Armor Hall in Kurabara, Takane-cho in Hokuto-shi and the Yumido (archery hall) at the lateral side of Nagano-ken are also related facilities to Yanodo, but the details are unfortunately unclear.

Existing Yanodo as of year 2020 was rebuilt in 1781 by those who lived in the O-Ne district of then Kobuchisawa-mura and its surrounding area, and a statue of the Kannon was enshrined.

Since 1820, the temple has offered 600 scrolls of the Daihannyakyo Sutra and performed event of chanting those and unveiled Guanyin as well as held February-noon Puja. As of today, the chanting ceremony is held every year on May 3.

== Precincts ==
In addition to the main hall, sutra storehouse and Hokyointo pagoda, there are 53 stone structures in the compound including Hayagriva, the Nembutsu Memorial pagoda and the Blue-faced Vajra Koshin tower.

Until the beginning of the Showa era (1926–1989), there was a small Emado hall beside Yanodo, where the plaques of Ema (votive picture) were dedicated, and it was worshipped by the local farmers, but in the mid-20th century, both the hall and the plaques were lost and no longer exist.

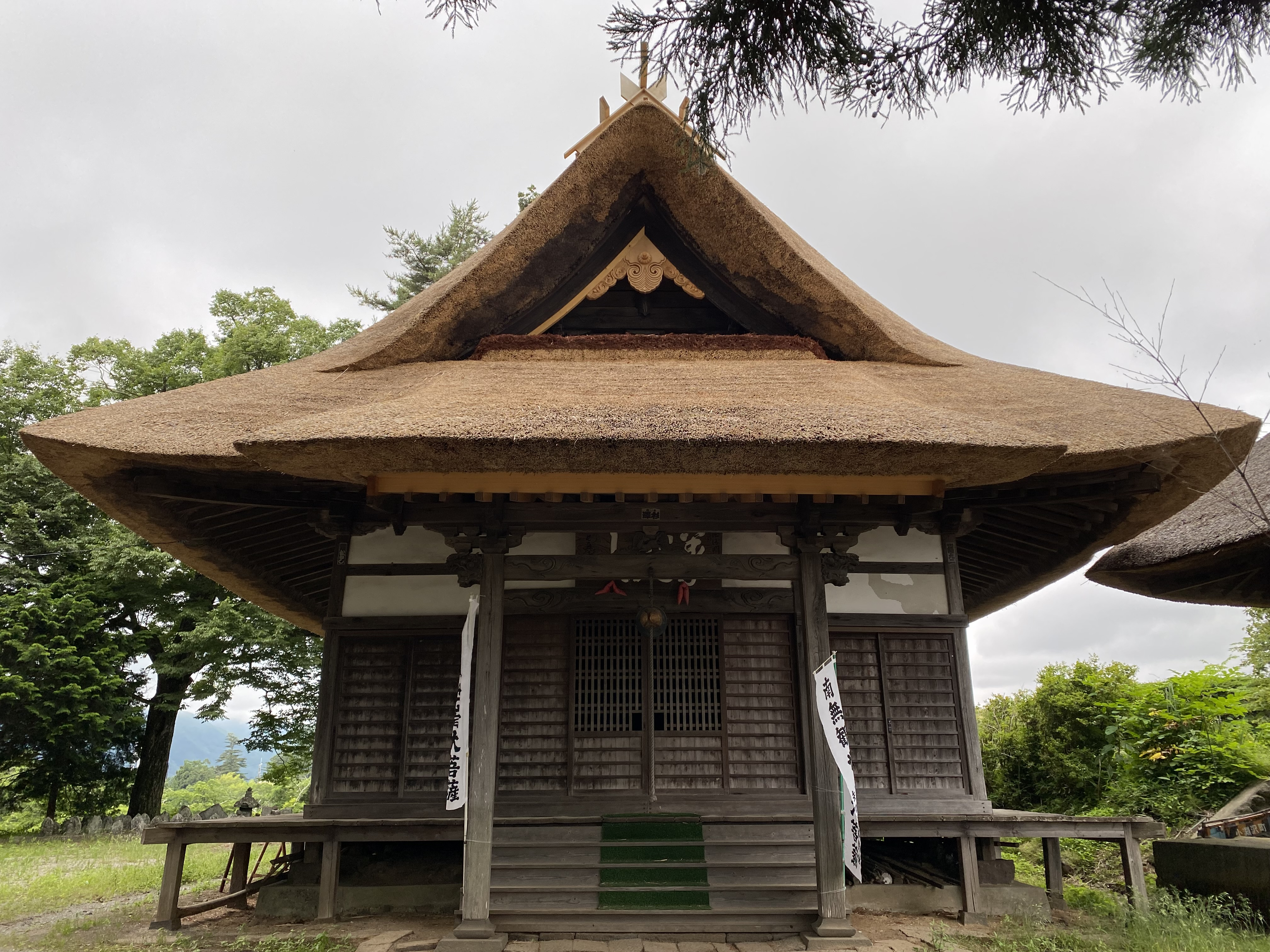
The main hall

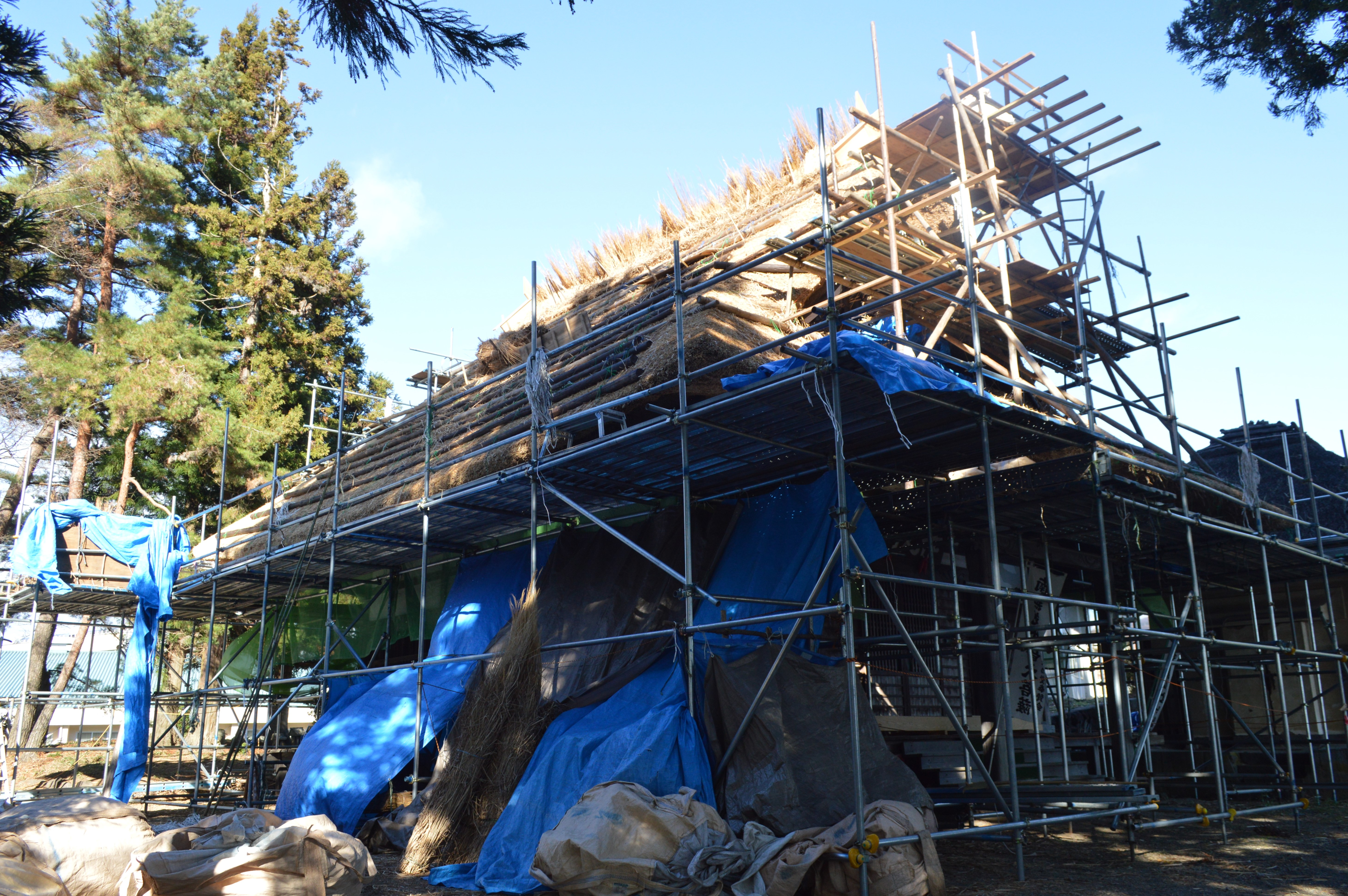
The main hall (under repair)

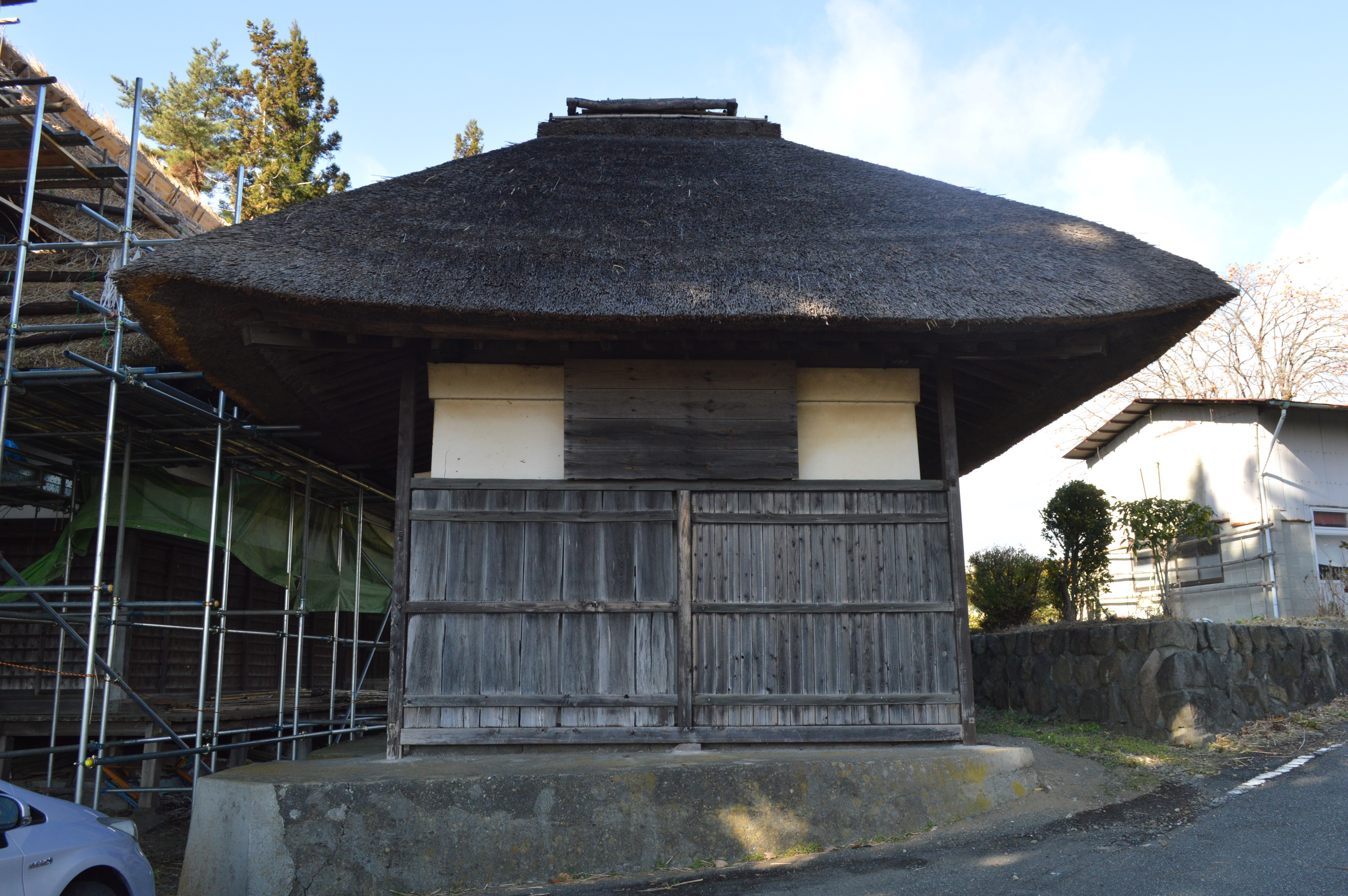
Sutra storehouse

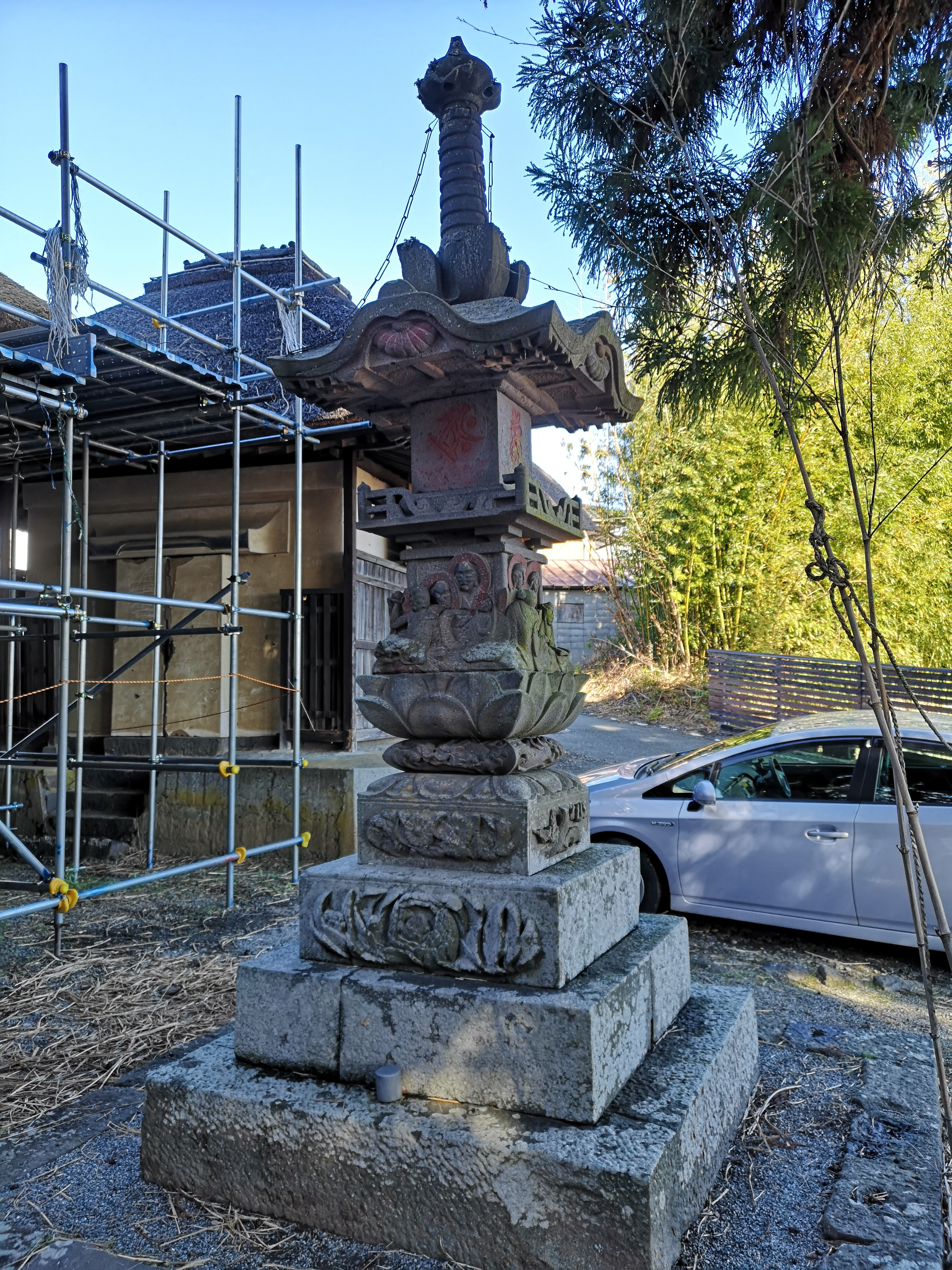
Hokyointo Pagoda

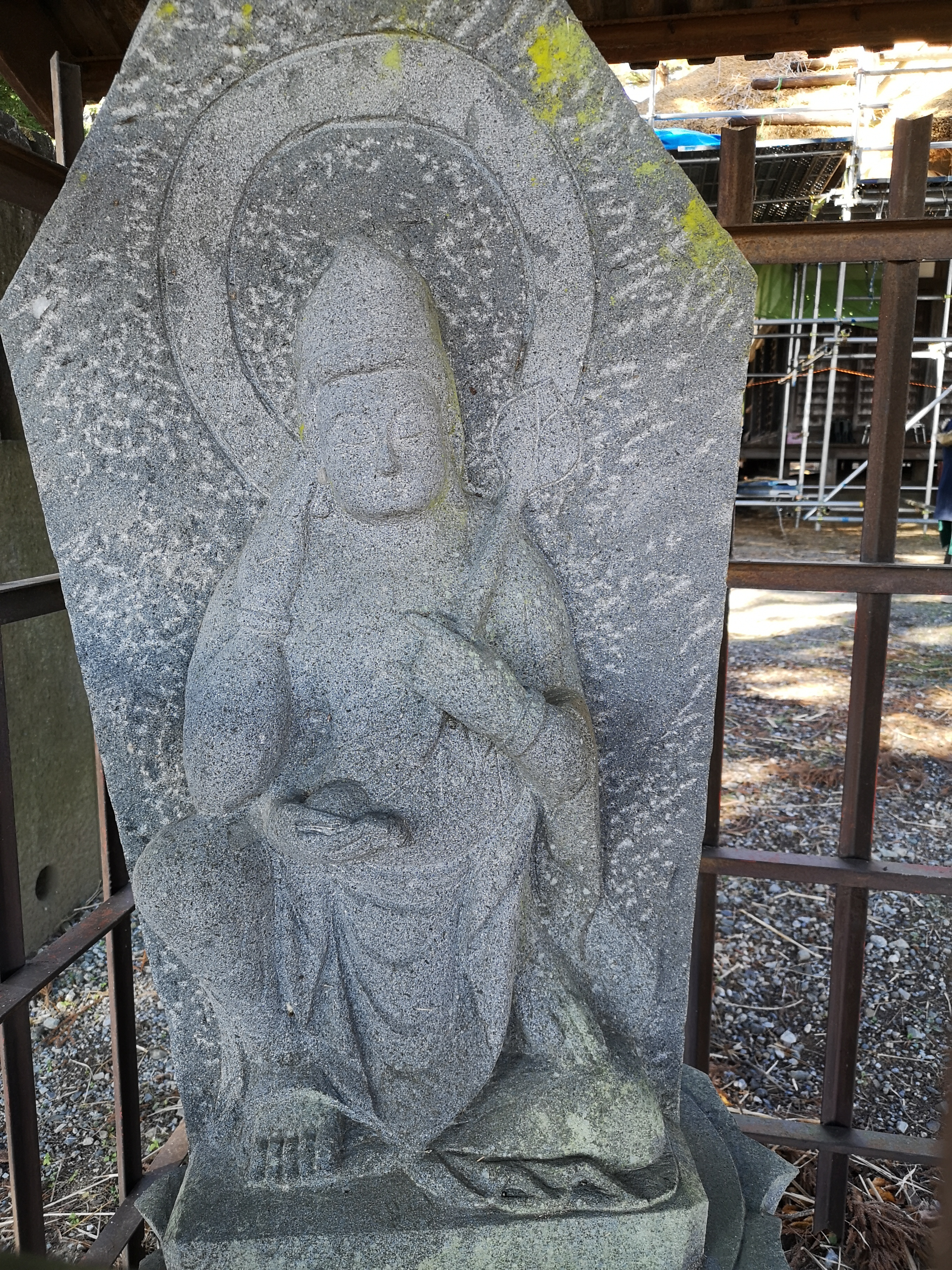
Statue of Kannon with engraved inscriptions

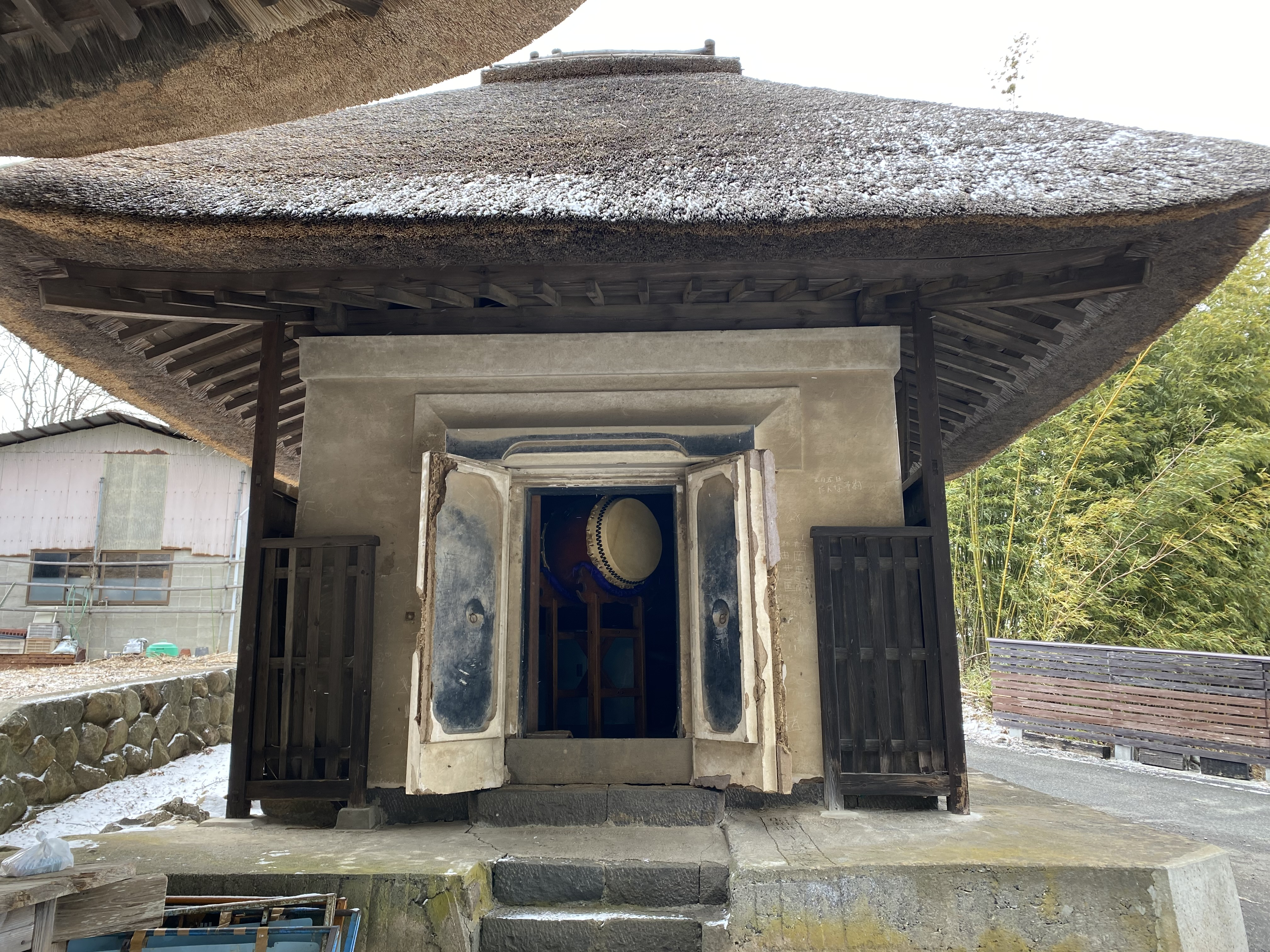
Kyodo (Sutra storehouse)

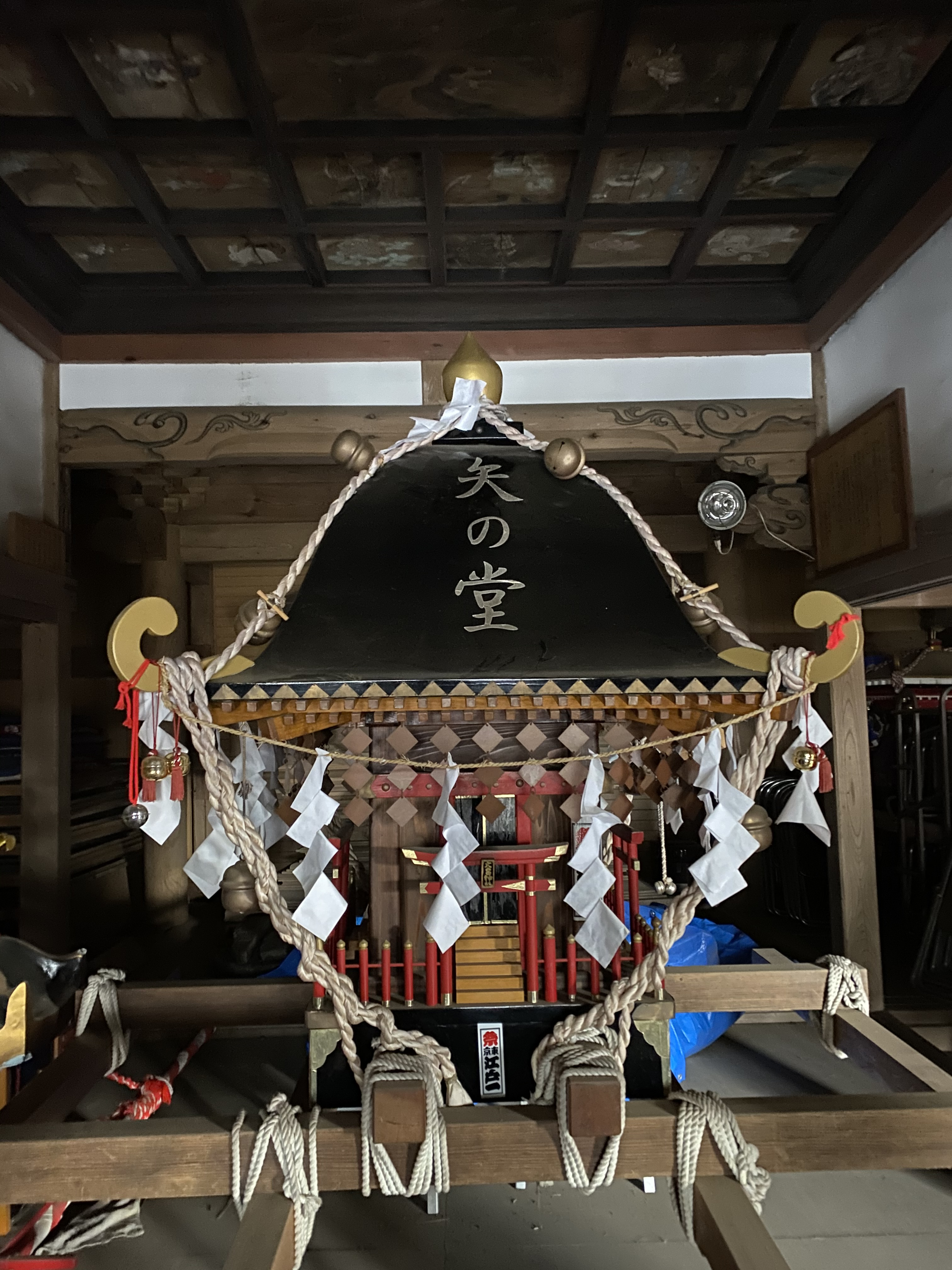
Portable shrine of Yanodo

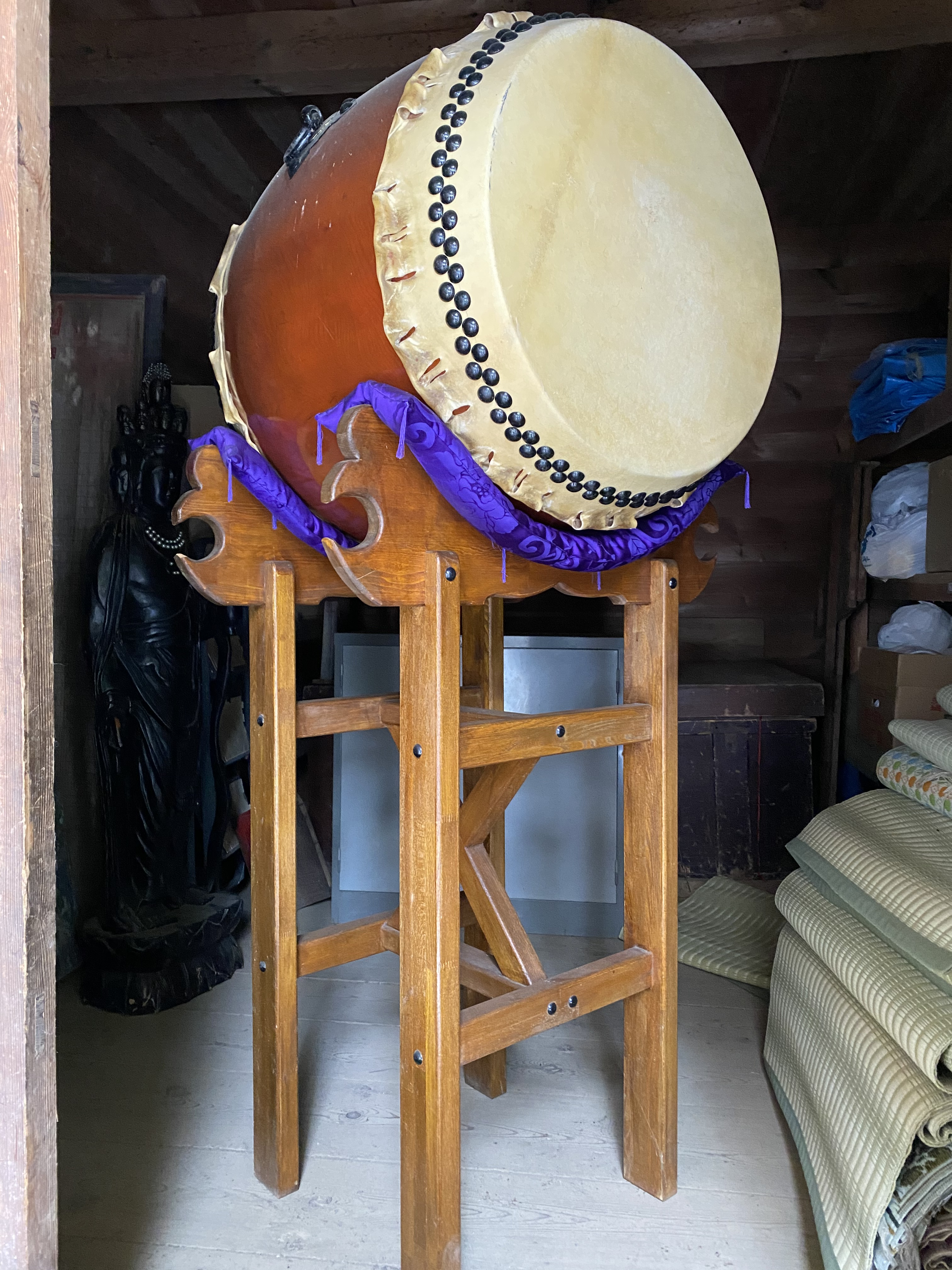
Yanodo Japanese Drum

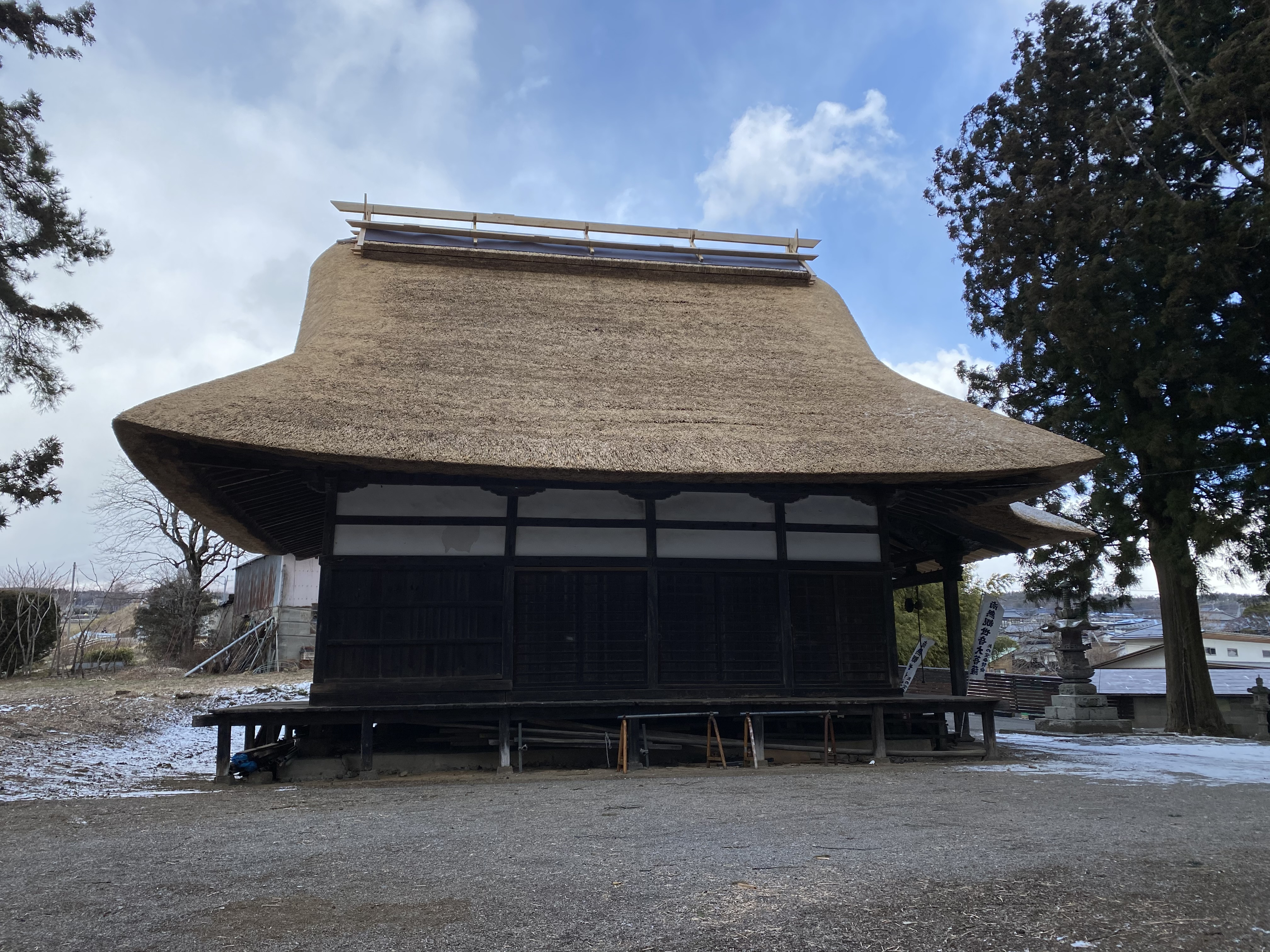
Full view of the main hall

== Cultural Properties ==
=== Yanodo ===
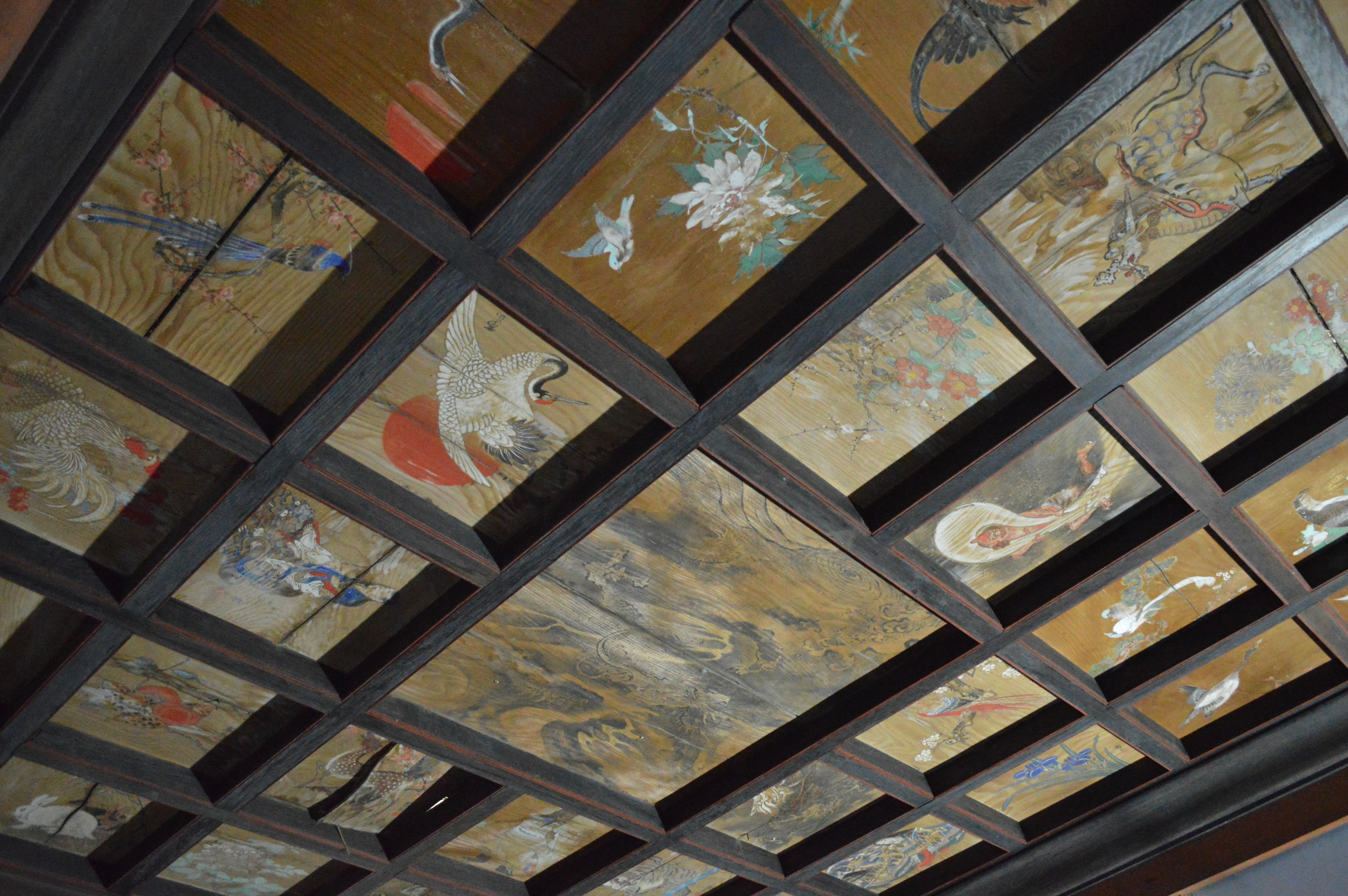
Amazing artistic flower paintings

Rebuilt in 1781, it was designated as a cultural asset by Kobuchisawa-machi on June 10, 1968.

The main hall with a thatched roof and being blessed with a talisman called "Gohei" in its attic has a frontage of 7.3m and adepth of 9m. It has spleded flower painting on the ceiling drawn by Unkei, Tokoh and Untai.

With old Japanese style architectural structure named “Seiro Dukuri”, the sutra storehouse with thatched roof is 3.6m wide and 3.6m deep, remaining Goeika or a Tanka (a poem forming with thirty-one syllabled verse) depicting nature of Yanodo.

=== Hokyointo Pagoda ===
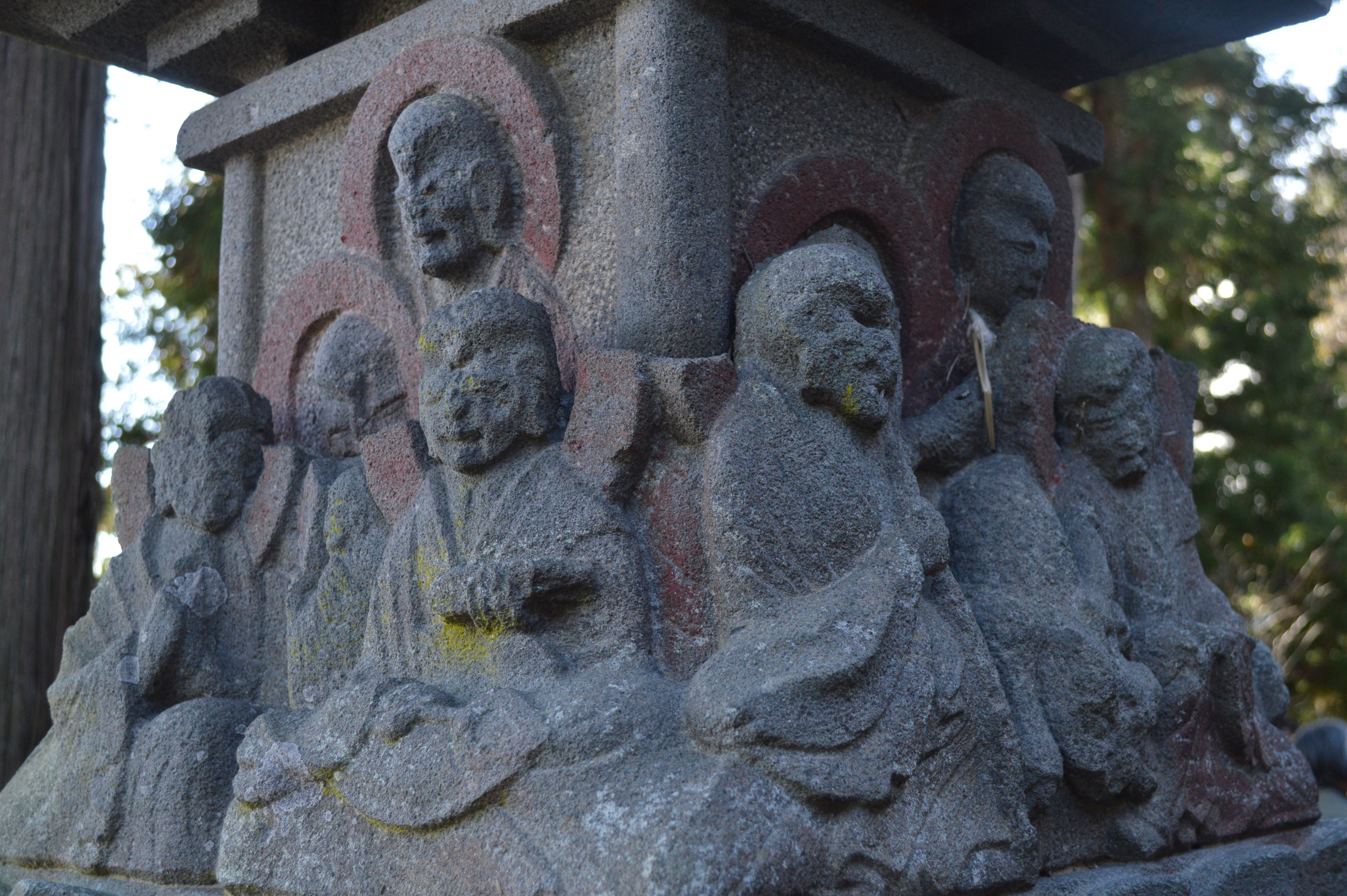
Hokyointo Pagoda with Sixteen Arhats

In 2000, it was designated as a cultural asset of Kobuchisawa-machi. Its registered name is "Hokyointo pagora of Yanodo".

It was made in 1813 by Ikegami Heiuemon Shuko, a stonecutter in Takato(Currently, Ina-shi, Nagano-ken). It is made of andesite and is 370 cm high. Under the roof, the upper layer is carved by relief engraving with the images of Buddha in all four directions and the lower layer with images of Sixteen Arhats, and the lotus seat and its lower part are also meticulously carved.

=== Yanodo Japanese Drum ===
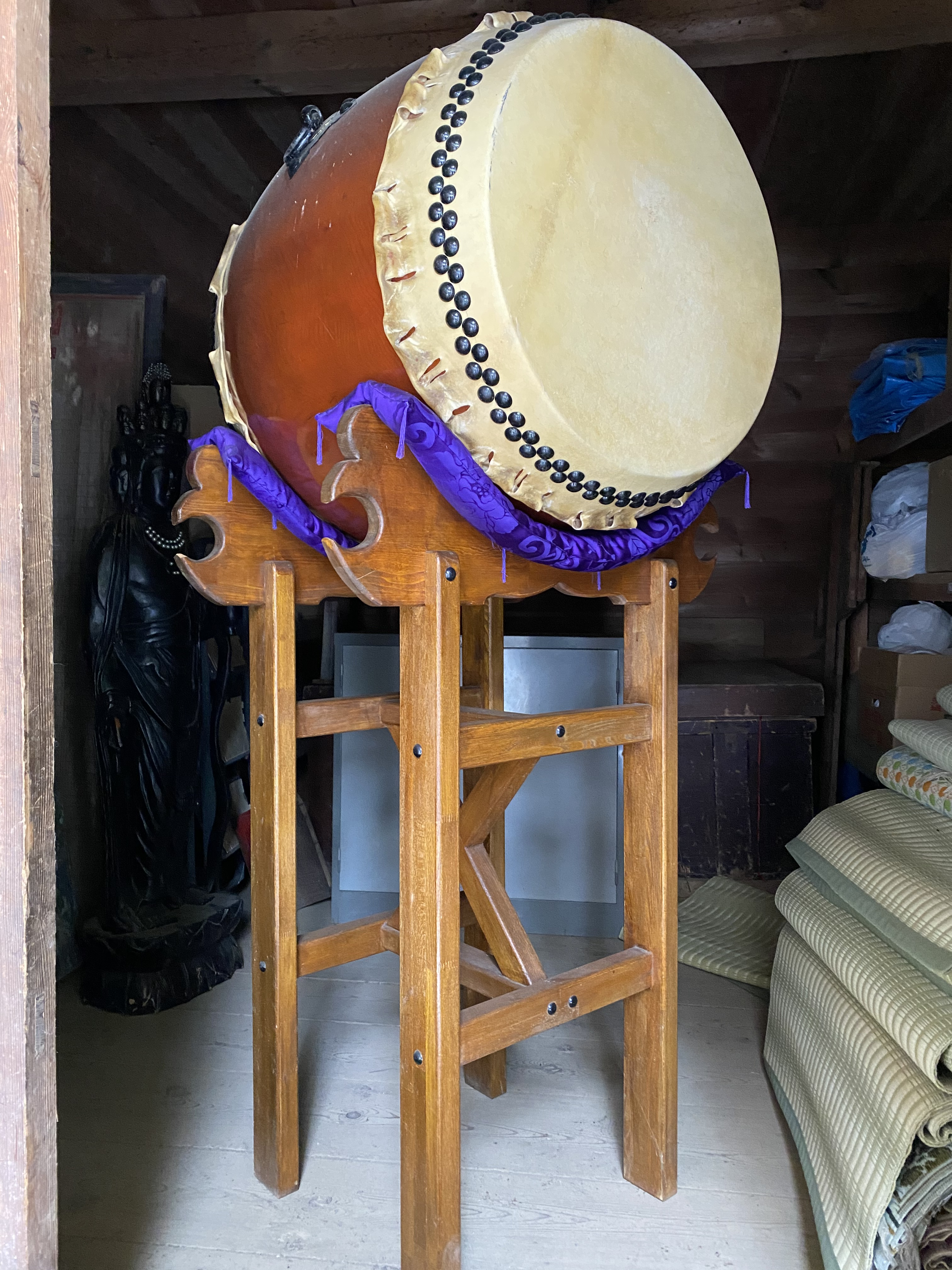
Yanodo Japanese Drum

Designated as a cultural asset by Kobuchisawa-machi in 2005. The registered name is "Yanodo-no-Taiko".

In 1850, the drum was made by Kyuzo, an artisan from Daigaharajyuku on the old Koshu Highway adjacent to the Kobuchisawa area. The manufacture year is written on the inside of the drum body, which is made of hollowed-out Japanese zelkova, not on the drum's front and back skins.

== Ritual Events ==
It's worth watching that the main events are the annual "Yanodo Festival", and the "Unveiled Guanyin" of Yano Kannon which held every 61 years.

The "Yanodo Festival" has been held on the second-noon day of February every year since 1820, and it used to consist of the chanting of the Daihannyakyo Sutra and the second-noon Festival by Shokyuji Temple in concert with the Second-noon Religious Association, and was considered the first spring festival in the region.

At the beginning, the Daihannyakyo Sutra chanting was held once every 61 years along with the Unveiled Guanyin statue, at some point however, it became an annual event as part of the Yanodo Festival.

On the day of the festival, members of religious association from nearby villages and people belonging to it pulling horses even from far away in Shinano province (today, Nagano-ken) gather early in the morning to pray for a good harvest, safety in their homes, and good health for their horses and are offered a prayer by chanting 600 scrolls of the Daihannyakyo Sutra. Then, they get an amulet, Ema and sacred sake before getting back to their homes.

There are two types of Ema: the "East Maya" and the "West Maya," which were drawn with the horse's head facing the direction of the stable's exit, and the Ema that suited each stable was brought home and displayed in a stable. Those who had borrowed money from the association to buy a horse would settle the loan while those who had borrowed money to buy a new horse would conclude the loan on the occasion of this festival.

After the Pacific War ended, the Yanodo Festival chaired by Yanodo Hosankai, referring to item #5, was held on March 30. Its date however has been changed to May 3 since 1965. In the 21st century, the second-noon day event was discontinued, and only the Daihannyakyo Sutra chanting ceremony has been held up until today.

== Yanodo Hosankai ==
The Yanodo Hosankai (hereinafter called “the Hosankai”) as a supporting association for continuously preserving Yanodo has been its owner since the Showa era, and it is written clearly in the official documents that the Hosankai was already active at the end of the Pacific War.

After more than 25 years had passed since the re-thatching work done in 1996, the Hosankai found the rafters and timbers that provide structural support for the roof of the hall had begun to deteriorate and decay for long time, so activities to restore the hall at last began in 2019.

In order to make it possible, they secured about 9 million yen in project expenses leveraged by subsidies from Hokuto-shi coupled with donations from local residents and their own funds, then began replacing the thatch in July 2020.

The work is being carried out by thatchers from Fujikawaguchiko-machi in Yamanashi-ken, who are removing old thatch and replacing it with new one as well as repairing decayed beams.

The protection activities are being vigorously implemented by the Hosankai in the hope of sustainably passing down the history and culture of the region from generation to generation through the preservation of the important cultural properties and heritages of the district.

== Address and Place ==
- Address:2139 Kobuchisawa-cho, Hokuto-shi, Yamanashi-ken, Japan
- Place:Adjacent to Omiya Jinja shrine, it is located in one block of the village square that was mobilized by the new village development project.
