= Mukawa, Yamanashi =

Dissolved municipality in Yamanashi prefecture, Japan

Mukawa (武川村, Mukawa-mura) was a village located in Kitakoma District, Yamanashi Prefecture, Japan.

On November 1, 2004, Mukawa, along with the towns of Hakushū, Nagasaka, Sutama and Takane, and the villages of Akeno and Ōizumi (all from Kitakoma District), was merged to create the city of Hokuto.

Mukawa is the home of the Yamataka Jindai Zakura, cherry blossom tree, estimated to be nearly 2,000 years old.

== Demographics ==
As of 2003, the village had an estimated population of 3,301 people.

== Geography ==
The village has a density of 54.31/km^{2} (140.7/sq mi). The total area was 60.78 km^{2} (23.47 sq mi).
