= Kitashōji Falls =

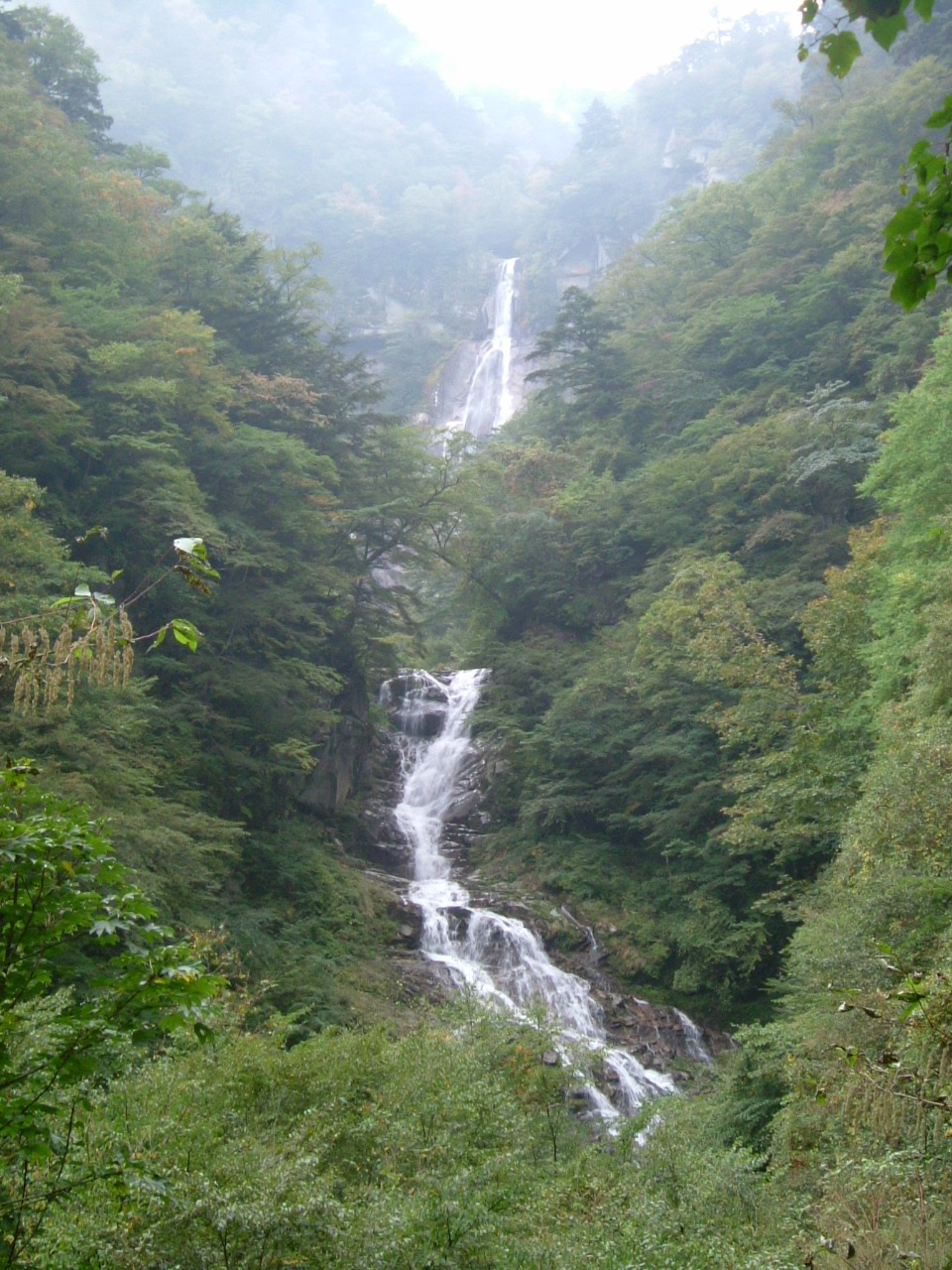
- Kitashōji Falls (upper) and Kudan Falls (lower)

- Location within Yamanashi Prefecture Location within Japan
- Location: Hokuto; Yamanashi Prefecture, Japan
- Coordinates: 35°43′52.42″N 138°21′17.90″E
- Type: cascade
- Total height: 121 metres (397 ft)
- Watercourse: Ishiutoro River/Fuji River

Kitashōji Falls (北精進ケ滝, Kitashōji-ga-taki) is a waterfall in northern Yamanashi Prefecture Japan, on the Ishiutoro River, an upper tributary of the Fuji River. It is located in the Minami Alps National Park, in the city of Hokuto. The falls have a width of 35 metres (115 ft) and a drop of 121 metres (397 ft).

The Kitashōji Falls is listed as one of the "Japan’s Top 100 Waterfalls", in a listing published by the Japanese Ministry of the Environment in 1990.

The falls drop down a granite cliff, which is part of the Itoigawa-Shizuoka Tectonic Line in three cascades. Below the main falls is the Kudan Falls (九段の滝, Kudan-no-taki), with a width of 20 metres (66 ft) and a drop of 40 metres (130 ft).
