= Teikyo-Gakuen Junior College =

Private university in Japan

Coordinates: 35°52′07.21″N 138°19′18.44″E

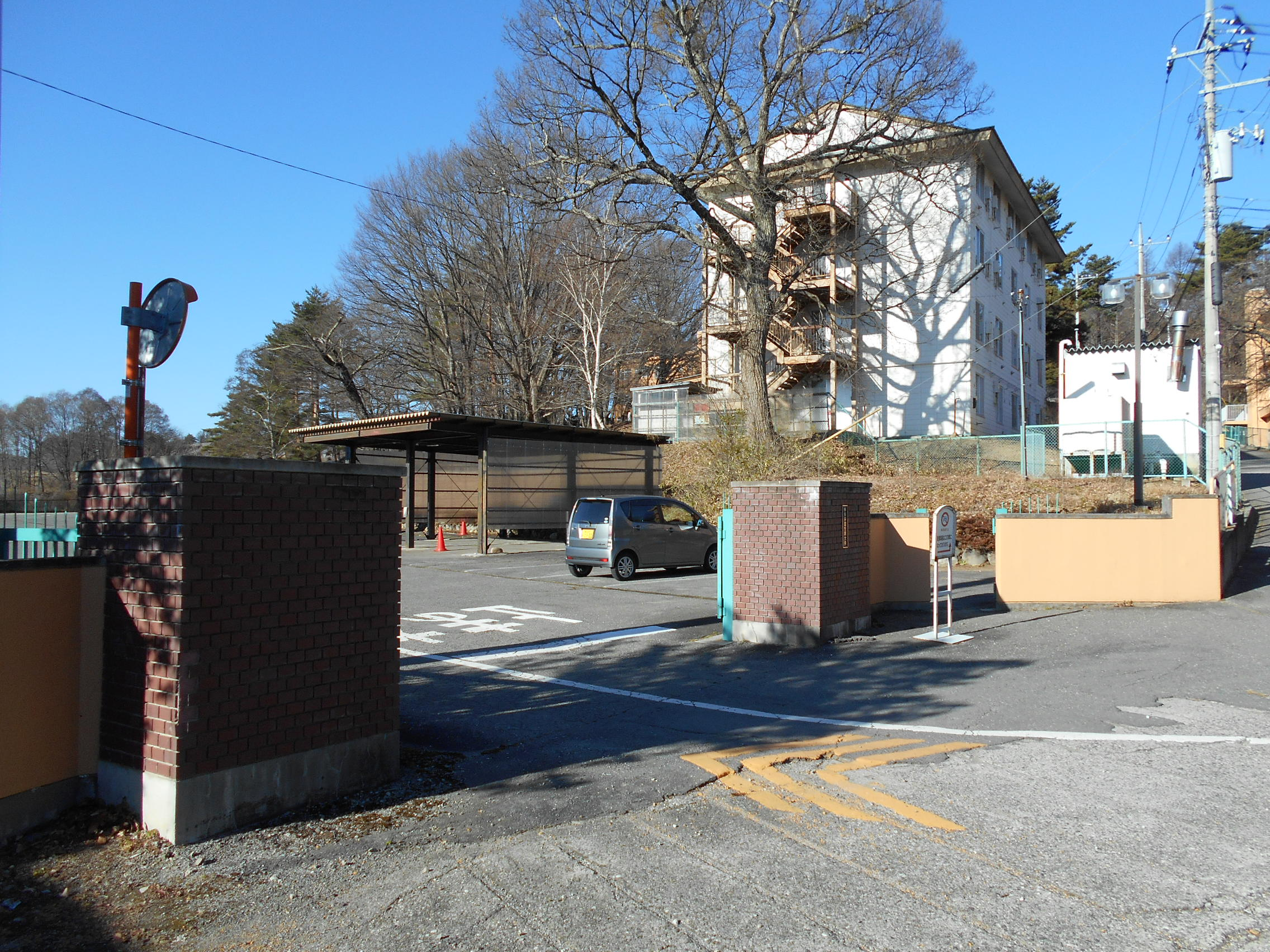
Teikyo Gakuen Junior College

Teikyo-Gakuen Junior College (帝京学園短期大学, Teikyō gakuen tanki daigaku) is a private university in Hokuto, Yamanashi, Japan. The school was founded in April 1967 as a women's junior college. It became coeducational in 1990.
