= Sutama, Yamanashi =

Dissolved municipality in Yamanashi prefecture, Japan

Sutama (須玉町, Sutama-chō) was a town located in Kitakoma District, Yamanashi Prefecture, Japan.

As of 2003, the town had an estimated population of 7,126 and a density of 40.89 persons per km^{2}. The total area was 174.26 km^{2}.

On November 1, 2004, Sutama, along with the towns of Hakushū, Nagasaka and Takane, and the villages of Akeno, Mukawa and Ōizumi (all from Kitakoma District), was merged to create the city of Hokuto.
