= Akeno, Yamanashi =

Dissolved municipality in Yamanashi prefecture, Japan

Flag of Akeno village

Akeno (明野村, Akeno-mura) was a village located in Kitakoma District, Yamanashi Prefecture, Japan. Its territory includes Yama-Ogasawara, the village which gave its name to Ogasawara Nagakiyo, his clan of samurai, and—eventually—to the Ogasawara Islands in the North Pacific south of Tokyo. (Ogasawara itself is twinned with another location—Hara-Ogasawara in nearby Minami-Alps—due to the similar names.)

As of 2003, the village had an estimated population of 4,750 and a density of 169.04 persons per km^{2}. The total area was 28.10 km^{2}.

On November 1, 2004, Akeno, along with the towns of Hakushū, Nagasaka, Sutama and Takane, and the villages of Mukawa and Ōizumi (all from Kitakoma District), was merged to create the city of Hokuto.
