= Takane, Yamanashi =

Dissolved municipality in Yamanashi prefecture, Japan

Takane (高根町, Takane-chō) was a town located in Kitakoma District, Yamanashi Prefecture, Japan.

As of 2003, the town had an estimated population of 9,579 and a density of 148.14 persons per km^{2}. The total area was 64.66 km^{2}.

On November 1, 2004, Takane, along with the towns of Hakushū, Nagasaka and Sutama, and the villages of Akeno, Mukawa and Ōizumi (all from Kitakoma District), was merged to create the city of Hokuto.
