= Kobuchisawa, Yamanashi =

Dissolved municipality in Yamanashi prefecture, Japan

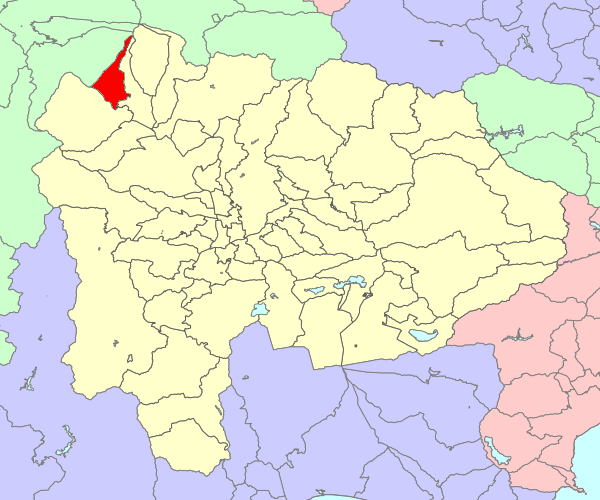
Kobuchizawa in Yamanashi Prefecture

Kobuchizawa (小淵沢町, Kobuchizawa-chō) was a town located in Kitakoma District, Yamanashi Prefecture, Japan.

As of 2003, the town had an estimated population of 6,127 and a density of 184.88 persons per km^{2}. The total area was 33.14 km^{2}.

On March 15, 2006, Kobuchizawa was merged into the expanded city of Hokuto. Therefore, Kitakoma District was dissolved as the result of this merger.
