= Kitakoma District, Yamanashi =

Former district in Yamanashi prefecture, Japan

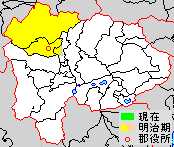
Map showing original extent of Kitakoma District in Yamanashi Prefecture: * yellow - areas formerly within the district borders during the early Meiji period

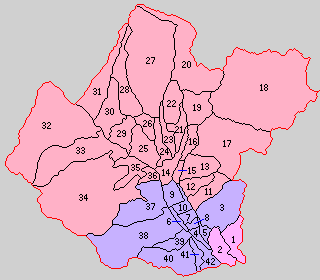
Colored areas are in this district.

Kitakoma (北巨摩郡, Kitakoma-gun) was a district located in Yamanashi Prefecture, Japan.

As of March 2006, the district had an estimated population of 6,127 with a density of 184.88 persons per km^{2}. The total area was 33.14 km^{2}.

== Municipalities ==
Prior to its dissolution, the district consisted of only one town:

- Kobuchisawa (Note: Classified as a town.)

== History ==
=== District Timeline ===
Kitakoma District was founded from the split of Koma District during the early Meiji period establishment of the municipalities system on July 22, 1878 and initially consisted of 44 villages.

=== Recent mergers ===
- On September 1, 2004 - The town of Futaba was merged with the towns of Ryūō and Shikishima (both from Nakakoma District) to create the city of Kai.
- On November 1, 2004 - The towns of Hakushū, Nagasaka, Sutama and Takane, and the villages of Akeno, Mukawa and Ōizumi were merged to create the city of Hokuto.
- On March 15, 2006 - The town of Kobuchisawa was merged into the expanded city of Hokuto. Kitakoma District was dissolved as a result of this merger.

== See also ==
- List of dissolved districts of Japan
