= Hakushū, Yamanashi =

Dissolved municipality in Yamanashi prefecture, Japan

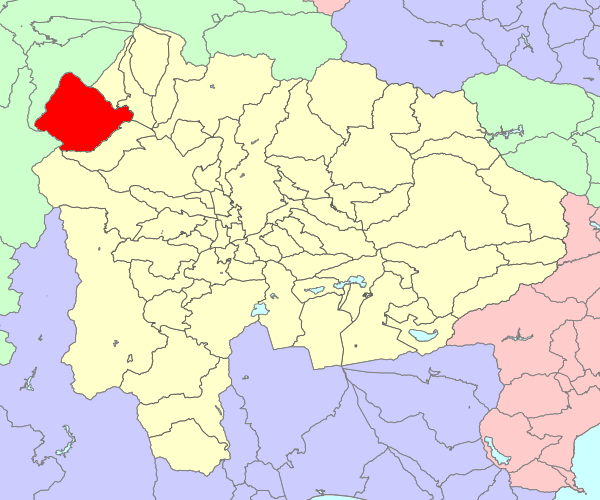
Hakushū in Yamanashi Prefecture

Hakushū (白州町, Hakushū-machi) was a town located in Kitakoma District, Yamanashi Prefecture, Japan.

As of 2003, the town had an estimated population of 4,287 and a density of 31.06 persons per km^{2}. The total area was 138.02 km^{2}.

== History ==
On November 1, 2004, Hakushū, along with the towns of Nagasaka, Sutama and Takane, and the villages of Akeno, Mukawa and Ōizumi (all from Kitakoma District), was merged to create the city of Hokuto.
