= Hokuto, Yamanashi =

Hokuto 北杜市
- City
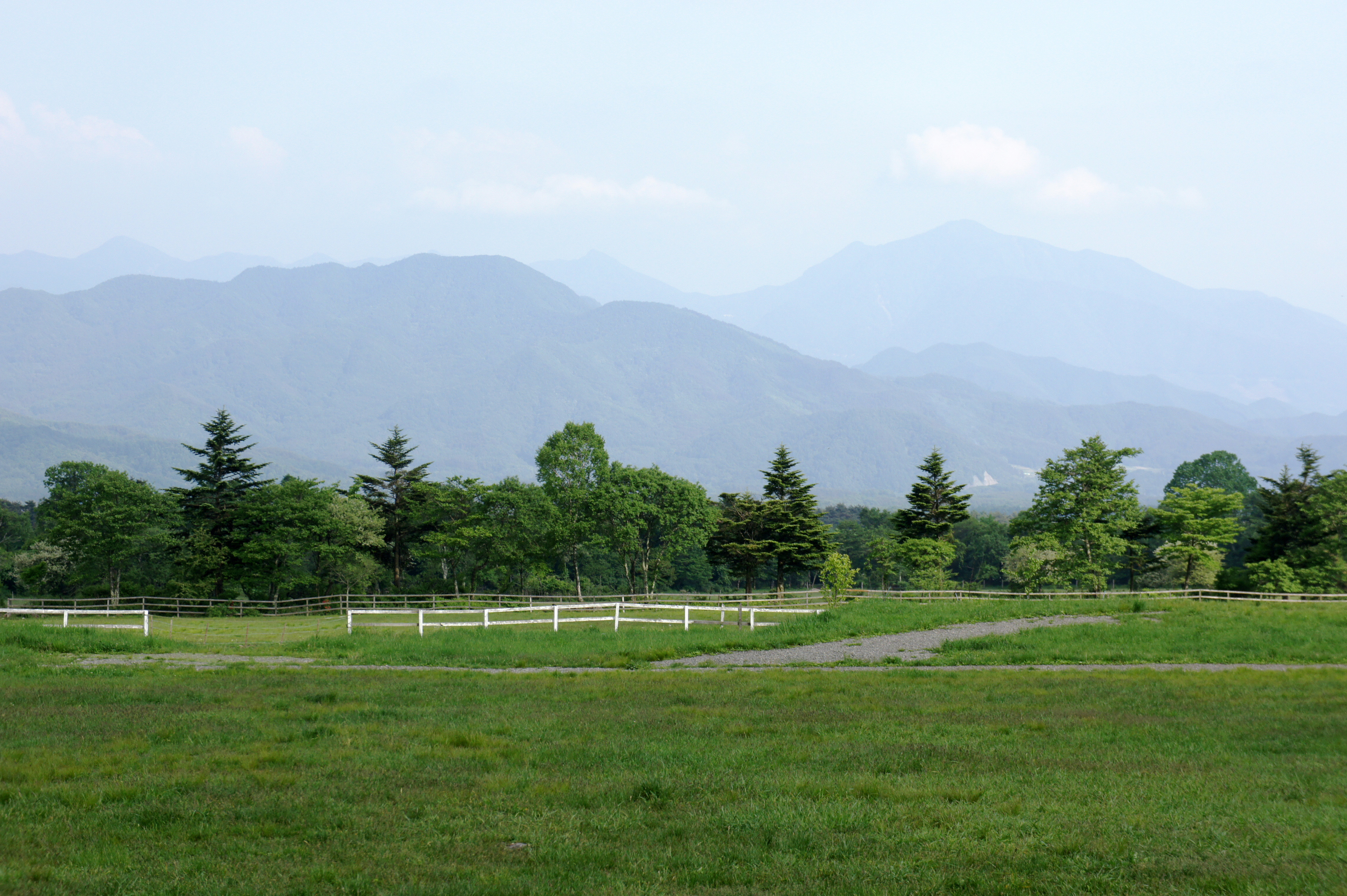
- Keep farm in Kiyosato Plateau

- Flag Seal

- Location of Hokuto in Yamanashi Prefecture

- Coordinates: 35°46′35.3″N 138°25′25.1″E
- Country: Japan
- Region: Chūbu (Tōkai)
- Prefecture: Yamanashi Prefecture

Government
  - Mayor: Kunihiko Oshiba 大柴邦彦 (since November 2024)

Area
  - Total: 602.48 km^{2} (232.62 sq mi)

Population (October 1, 2020)
  - Total: 45,684
  - Density: 75.827/km^{2} (196.39/sq mi)
- Time zone: UTC+9 (Japan Standard Time)
- Phone number: 0551-42-1111
- Address: 961-1 Daizu-namada, Sutama-chō, Hokuto-shi, Yamanashi-ken 408-0188
- Climate: Cfa
- Website: Official website
- Symbols
- Bird: Ural owl
- Flower: Sunflower
- Tree: Japanese red pine

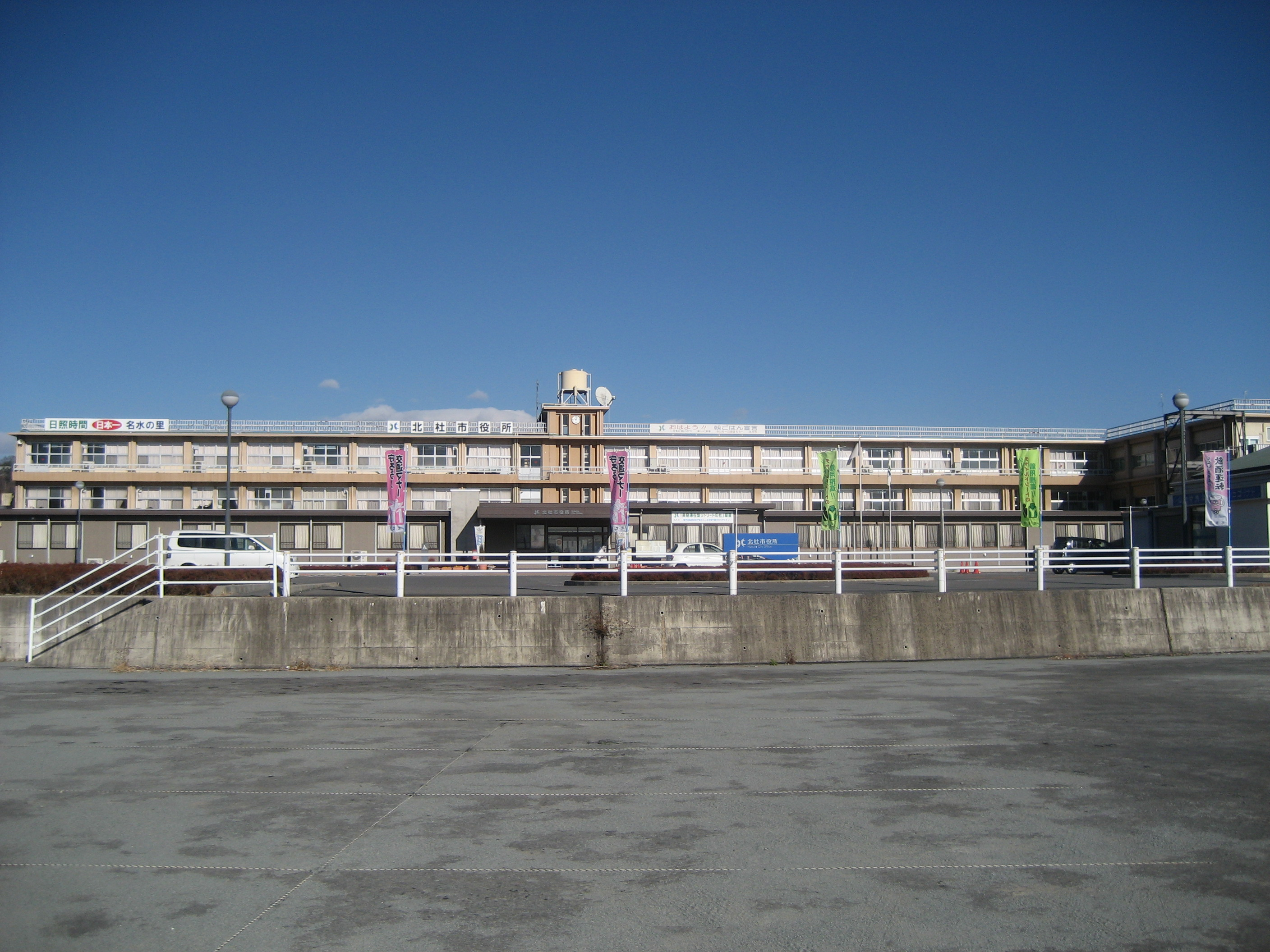
Hokuto City Hall

Hokuto (北杜市, Hokuto-shi) is a city located in Yamanashi Prefecture, Japan. As of 1 October 2020, the city had an estimated population of 45,684 in 22,091 households, and a population density of 78 inhabitants per square kilometre (200/sq mi). The total area of the city is 602.48 square kilometres (232.62 sq mi).

== Geography ==
Hokuto is located in far northwest Yamanashi Prefecture. Most of the area of the city is elevated highland and forested, with one third of the city located on the alpine southeastern slopes of Mount Yatsugatake, With a cooler alpine climate in summer, smaller towns such as Kiyosato are a popular location for second homes.

=== Neighboring municipalities ===
- Yamanashi Prefecture
  - Kōfu
  - Nirasaki
  - Minami-arupusu
  - Kai
- Nagano Prefecture
  - Chino
  - Ina
  - Suwa District: Fujimi
  - Minamisaku District: Kawakami, Minamimaki

== Climate ==
The city has a climate characterized by hot and humid summers, and relatively mild winters (Köppen climate classification Cfa). The average annual temperature in Hokuto is 11.2 °C (52.2 °F). The average annual rainfall is 1296 mm with September as the wettest month. The temperatures are highest on average in August, at around 23.8 °C (74.8 °F), and lowest in January, at around −1.0 °C (30.2 °F).

Climate data for Ōizumi, Hokuto (1991–2020 normals, extremes 1977–present)
Month	Jan	Feb	Mar	Apr	May	Jun	Jul	Aug	Sep	Oct	Nov	Dec	Year
Record high °C (°F)	16.2 (61.2)	20.6 (69.1)	23.1 (73.6)	28.3 (82.9)	31.1 (88.0)	35.4 (95.7)	35.6 (96.1)	36.5 (97.7)	34.2 (93.6)	29.1 (84.4)	24.0 (75.2)	19.0 (66.2)	36.5 (97.7)
Mean daily maximum °C (°F)	4.7 (40.5)	6.0 (42.8)	10.1 (50.2)	16.0 (60.8)	20.8 (69.4)	23.5 (74.3)	27.3 (81.1)	28.7 (83.7)	24.2 (75.6)	18.5 (65.3)	13.1 (55.6)	7.6 (45.7)	16.7 (62.1)
Daily mean °C (°F)	−0.2 (31.6)	0.6 (33.1)	4.3 (39.7)	9.8 (49.6)	14.8 (58.6)	18.4 (65.1)	22.2 (72.0)	23.1 (73.6)	19.1 (66.4)	13.3 (55.9)	7.7 (45.9)	2.5 (36.5)	11.3 (52.3)
Mean daily minimum °C (°F)	−5.0 (23.0)	−4.6 (23.7)	−1.1 (30.0)	4.1 (39.4)	9.5 (49.1)	14.2 (57.6)	18.5 (65.3)	19.1 (66.4)	15.1 (59.2)	8.8 (47.8)	2.8 (37.0)	−2.2 (28.0)	6.6 (43.9)
Record low °C (°F)	−14.4 (6.1)	−14.2 (6.4)	−10.7 (12.7)	−7.3 (18.9)	−1.5 (29.3)	5.7 (42.3)	10.2 (50.4)	9.7 (49.5)	3.6 (38.5)	−2.0 (28.4)	−6.4 (20.5)	−11.8 (10.8)	−14.4 (6.1)
Average precipitation mm (inches)	40.9 (1.61)	41.9 (1.65)	77.3 (3.04)	82.4 (3.24)	96.5 (3.80)	135.1 (5.32)	155.5 (6.12)	127.3 (5.01)	171.1 (6.74)	138.6 (5.46)	48.0 (1.89)	32.2 (1.27)	1,146.8 (45.15)
Average precipitation days (≥ 1.0 mm)	4.9	5.1	8.5	8.7	9.8	12.1	13.3	10.2	10.5	9.3	6.3	4.9	103.6
Mean monthly sunshine hours	205.7	196.3	205.7	211.9	210.7	158.1	163.0	194.2	150.2	166.3	187.0	195.6	2,249.2
Source: Japan Meteorological Agency

== Demographics ==
Per Japanese census data, the population of Hokuto has remained relatively stable over the past 50 years.

Historical population
Year	Pop.	±%
1940	51,131	—
1950	68,254	+33.5%
1960	59,831	−12.3%
1970	47,356	−20.9%
1980	44,320	−6.4%
1990	46,200	+4.2%
2000	47,888	+3.7%
2010	46,968	−1.9%
2020	44,053	−6.2%

== History ==
During the Edo period, all of Kai Province was tenryō territory under direct control of the Tokugawa shogunate. During the cadastral reform of the early Meiji period on April 1, 1889, the rural district of Kitakoma was formed.

The modern city of Hokuto was established on November 1, 2004, from the merger of the towns of Hakushū, Nagasaka, Sutama and Takane, and the villages of Akeno, Mukawa and Ōizumi (all from Kitakoma District). On March 15, 2006, Hokuto absorbed the town of Kobuchisawa (also from Kitakoma District). Kitakoma District was dissolved as a result of this merger.

== Government ==
Hokuto has a mayor-council form of government with a directly elected mayor and a unicameral city legislature of 22 members.

== Economy ==
The economy of Hokuto is primarily agricultural, with seasonal tourism, precision manufacturing and food processing playing secondary roles.

== Education ==
- Teikyo-Gakuen Junior College
- Hokuto has eight public elementary schools and nine public middle schools operated by the city government and two public high schools operated by the Yamanashi Prefectural Board of Education.

== Transportation ==
=== Railway ===
- East Japan Railway Company - Chūō Main Line
  - Hinoharu - Nagasaka - Kobuchizawa
- East Japan Railway Company - Koumi Line
  - Kobuchizawa - Kai-Koizumi - Kai-Ōizumi - Kiyosato

=== Highway ===
- Chūō Expressway
- National Route 20
- National Route 141

== Sister cities ==
- (Japan) Fukuroi, Shizuoka, since March 9, 1987 between former Asaba, Shizuoka and former Akeno, Yamanashi
- (Japan) Joetsu, Niigata, since January 17, 1991 between former Misaka Town and former Kakizaki, Niigata and Sutama, Yamanashi
- (Japan) Hamura, Tokyo, since October 1, 1996 with former Takane Town
- (Japan) Nishitokyo, Tokyo, since February 4, 1999 between former Tanashi, Tokyo and the former town of Sutama, Yamanashi
- Madison County, Kentucky, United States, since May 12, 1990 with former municipalities of Takane, Nagasaka, Ōizumi, and Kobuchisawa
- LeMars, Iowa, United States, since July 3, 1993 with former Sutama Town
- Pocheon, Gyeonggi-do, South Korea, since March 21, 2003 with former Takane Town
- Manciano, Tuscany, Italy with former Kobuchisawa Town
- (Canada) Crowsnest Pass, Alberta (unratified)

== Local attractions ==
- Gikosan Yanodo Temple
- Kinsei ruins, a Jomon-period settlement trace and National Historic Site.
- Kitashōji Falls, one of Japan's Top 100 Waterfalls
- Kiyosato Plateau
- Musée Kiyoharu Shirakaba
- Nakamura Keith Haring Collection
- Seicho-no-Ie International Headquarters
- Umenoki ruins, a Jomon-period settlement trace and National Historic Site.
- Yato Castle, ruins of a Sengoku period castle, and National Historic Site
