= Kai-Koizumi Station =

Railway station in Hokuto, Yamanashi Prefecture, Japan

Kai-Koizumi Station 甲斐小泉駅
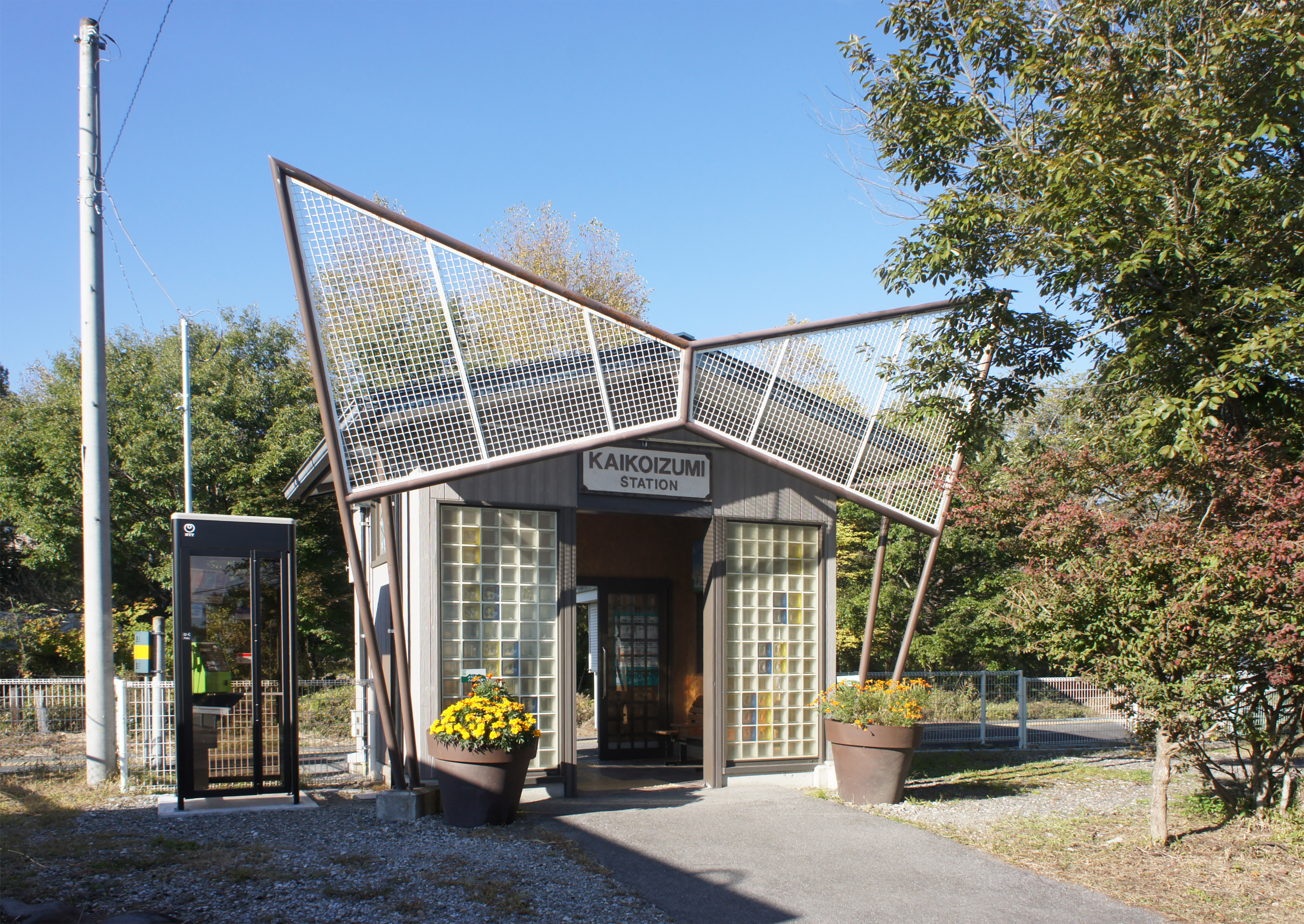
- Kai-Koizumi Station in October 2024

General information
- Location: 2003 Koarama, Nagasaka-cho, Hokuto-shi, Yamanashi-ken 408-0031; Japan
- Coordinates: 35°52′46.62″N 138°21′34.99″E
- Elevation: 1,044 meters
- Operator: JR East
- Line: ■ Koumi Line
- Distance: 7.1 km from Kobuchizawa
- Platforms: 2 side platforms

Other information
- Website: Official website

History
- Opened: 29 July 1933

Passengers
- FY2010: 22

Services
Preceding station	JR East	Following station
Kai-Ōizumi towards Komoro	Koumi Line	Kobuchizawa Terminus
Location
- Location within Yamanashi Prefecture Location within Japan

Kai-Koizumi Station (甲斐小泉駅, Kai-Koizumi-eki) is a railway station in the Koumi Line in the city of Hokuto, Yamanashi Prefecture, Japan, operated by East Japan Railway Company (JR East).

== Lines ==
Kai-Koizumi Station is served by the Koumi Line and is 7.1 kilometers from the starting point of the line at Kobuchizawa Station.

== Station layout ==
The station consists of two ground-level opposed side platforms, connected by a level crossing. The station is unattended.

=== Platforms ===
station side	■ Koumi Line	for Kobuchizawa
opp side	■ Koumi Line	for Koumi and Komoro

== History ==
Kai-Koizumi Station was opened on 27 July 1933 by the Japanese Government Railways. With the privatization of Japanese National Railways (JNR) on 1 April 1987, the station came under the control of JR East.

== Passenger statistics ==
In fiscal 2010, the station was used by an average of 22 passengers daily (boarding passengers only).

== Surrounding area ==
- Yatsugatake South Base Observatory
- Koizumi Post Office

== See also ==
- List of railway stations in Japan
