= Nagasaka, Yamanashi =

Dissolved municipality in Yamanashi prefecture, Japan

- Interactive map of Nagasaka, Yamanashi

Area
  - Total: 40.86 km^{2} (15.78 sq mi)

Population
  - Total: 9,377

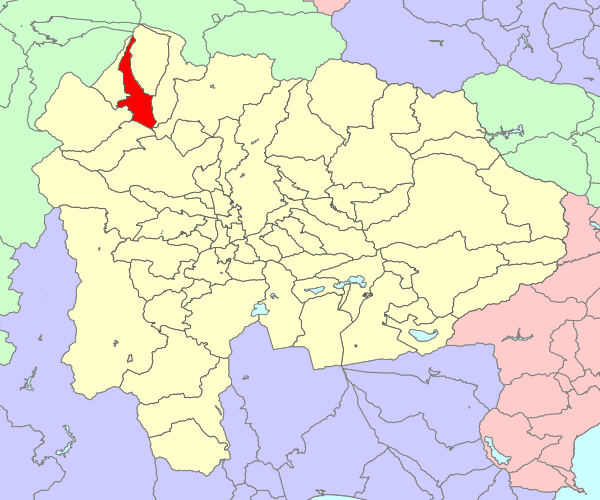
Nagasaka in Yamanashi Prefecture

Nagasaka (長坂町, Nagasaka-chō) was a town located in Kitakoma District, Yamanashi Prefecture, Japan.

As of 2003, the town had an estimated population of 9,377 and a density of 229.49 persons per km^{2}. The total area was 40.86 km^{2}.

On November 1, 2004, Nagasaka, along with the towns of Hakushū, Sutama and Takane, and the villages of Akeno, Mukawa and Ōizumi (all from Kitakoma District), was merged to create the city of Hokuto.
