= Nagasaka Station =

Railway station in Hokuto, Yamanashi Prefecture, Japan

CO50 Nagasaka Station 長坂駅
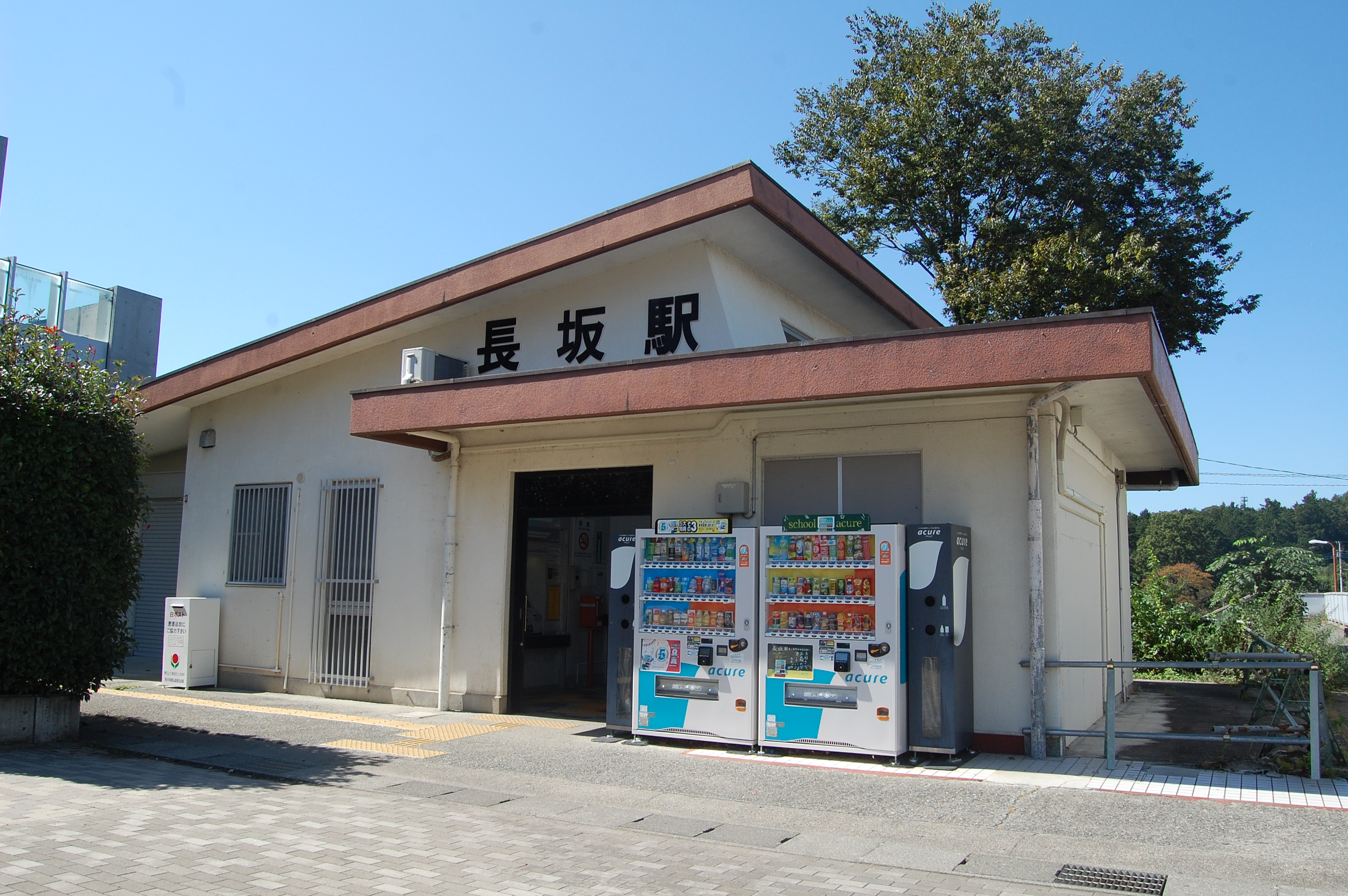
- Nagasaka Station in October 2021

General information
- Location: 2575, Nagasaka-cho Nagasaka-Kamijō, Hokuto-shi, Yamanashi-ken; Japan
- Coordinates: 35.827417°N 138.366889°E
- Operator: JR East
- Line: ■ Chūō Main Line
- Distance: 166.3 km from Tokyo
- Platforms: 2 side platforms
- Tracks: 2

Other information
- Status: Unstaffed
- Website: Official website

History
- Opened: December 11, 1918

Passengers
- 2015: 1131 daily

Services
Preceding station	JR East	Following station
Kobuchizawa CO51 towards Shiojiri	Chūō Main Line Local	Hinoharu CO49 towards Tachikawa
Location
- Location within Yamanashi Prefecture Location within Japan

Nagasaka Station (長坂駅, Nagasaka-eki) is a railway station of Chūō Main Line, East Japan Railway Company (JR East) in Nagasaka, in the city of Hokuto, Yamanashi Prefecture, Japan.

== Lines ==
Nagasaka Station is served by the Chūō Main Line, and is 166.3 kilometers from the terminus of the line at Tokyo Station.

== Station layout ==
The station consists of two opposed ground level side platforms. The station is built on a hill, with the tracks reached via stairs underneath. The station is unattended.

=== Platforms ===
1	■ Chūō Main Line	for Kōfu, Hachiōji and Shinjuku
2	■ Chūō Main Line	for Kobuchizawa, Shiojiri and Matsumoto

== History ==
Nagasaka Station was opened on December 11, 1918 as a station on the Japanese Government Railways (JGR) Chūō Main Line. The JGR became the JNR (Japanese National Railways) after the end of World War II. Scheduled freight services were discontinued from February 1972. With the dissolution and privatization of the JNR on April 1, 1987, the station came under the control of the East Japan Railway Company.

== Passenger statistics ==
In fiscal 2015, the station was used by an average of 1,131 passengers daily (boarding passengers only).

== Surrounding area ==
- Former Nagasaka Town Hall
- Musée Kiyoharu Shirakaba

== See also ==
- List of railway stations in Japan
