= Ōizumi, Yamanashi =

Dissolved municipality in Yamanashi prefecture, Japan

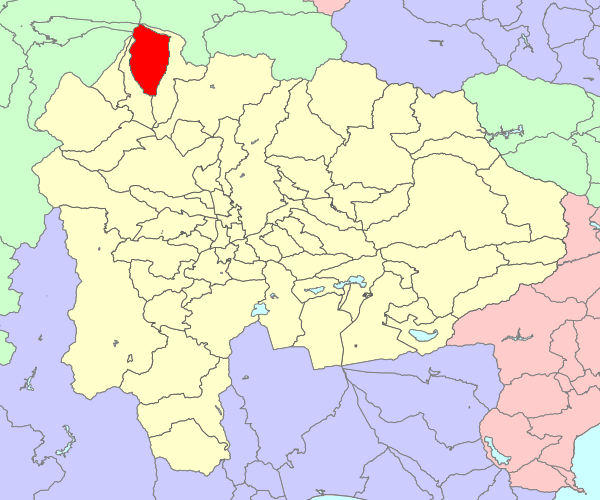
Ōizumi in Yamanashi Prefecture

Ōizumi (大泉村, Ōizumi-mura) was a village located in Kitakoma District, Yamanashi Prefecture, Japan.

As of 2003, the village had an estimated population of 4,155 and a density of 65.88 persons per km^{2}. The total area was 63.07 km^{2}.

== History ==
On November 1, 2004, Ōizumi, along with the towns of Hakushū, Nagasaka, Sutama and Takane, and the villages of Akeno and Mukawa (all from Kitakoma District), was merged to create the city of Hokuto.
