= Ōmiyama ruins =

Archaeological site

- 大深山遺跡 (Japanese)
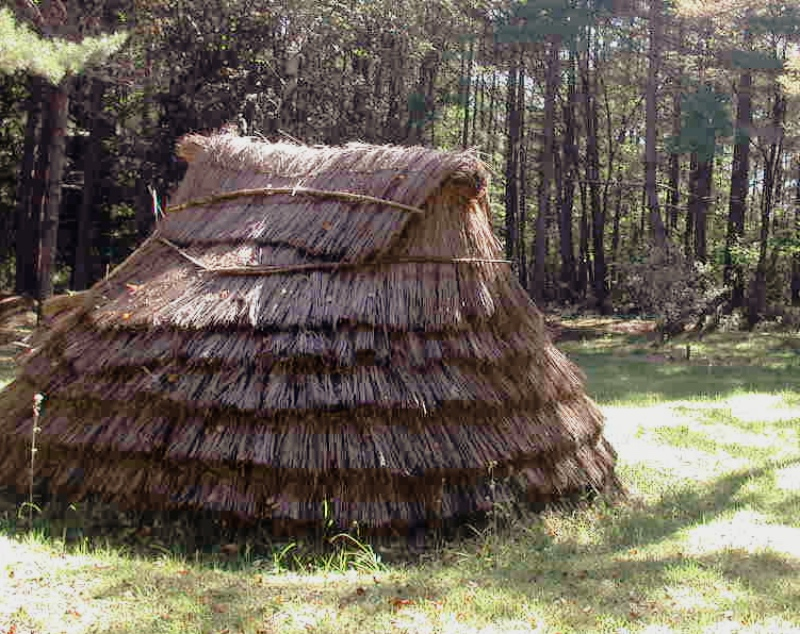
- reconstructed pit dwelling at Ōmiyama Ruins

- Ōmiyama ruins Ōmiyama ruins (Japan)
- 35°58′39″N 138°33′56″E
- Type: settlement
- Periods: Jōmon period
- Location: Kawakami, Nagano, Japan
- Region: Chūbu region

Site notes
- Elevation: 1,300 m (4,300 ft)
- Public access: Yes (archaeological park)

The Ōmiyama ruins (大深山遺跡, Ōmiyama iseki) is an archaeological site containing the ruins of a mid-Jōmon period (2500–1500 BCE) settlement located in the Ōmiyama neighborhood of the village of Kawakami, Nagano in the Chūbu region of Japan. The site was designated a National Historic Site of Japan in 1966.

== Overview ==
The Ōmiyama site is located on a plateau on the southeastern slope of Mount Yatsugatake at an altitude of 1300 meters, near the right bank of the headwaters of the Chikuma River. It was found during the construction of a forestry road. At an elevation of over 1300 meters, it is the highest of the Jōmon period ruins yet discovered around Mount Yatsugatake and one of the highest in Japan. It was excavated from 1953, during which time a dense concentration of over 50 pit dwellings, paving stones and tens of thousands of Jōmon pottery shards and stone tools were found, including a unique pot with a human face design.

Currently, the site has two reconstructed pit houses and the Kawakami Village Cultural Center has a small collection of some of the artifacts found, including human-shaped pottery.

The site is approximately 15 minutes by car from Shinano-Kawakami Station on the JR East Koumi Line.

== See also ==
- List of Historic Sites of Japan (Nagano)
