= Saku-Uminokuchi Station =

Railway station in Minamimaki, Nagano Prefecture, Japan

Saku-Uminokuchi Station 佐久海ノ口駅
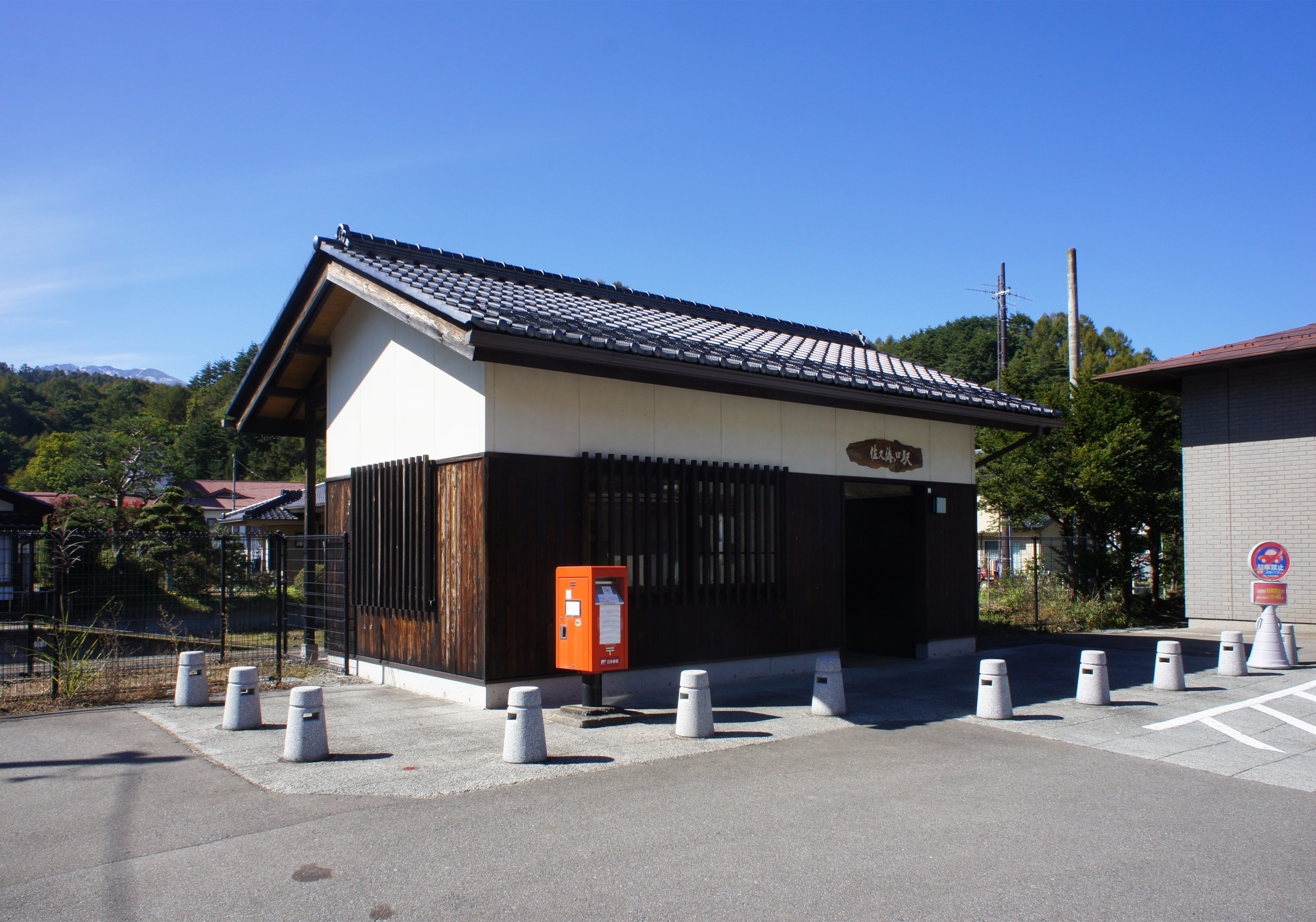
- Saku-Uminokuchi Station, October 2021

General information
- Location: 975 Uminokuchi, Minamimaki-mura, Minamisaku-gun, Nagano-ken 384-1302; Japan
- Coordinates: 36.0212°N 138.4908°E
- Elevation: 1064 meters
- Operator: JR East
- Line: ■ Koumi Line
- Distance: 39.7 km from Kobuchizawa
- Platforms: 2 side platforms

Other information
- Status: Unstaffed
- Website: Official website

History
- Opened: 27 December 1932

Services
Preceding station	JR East	Following station
Umijiri towards Komoro	Koumi Line	Saku-Hirose towards Kobuchizawa
Location
- Location within Nagano Prefecture Location within Japan

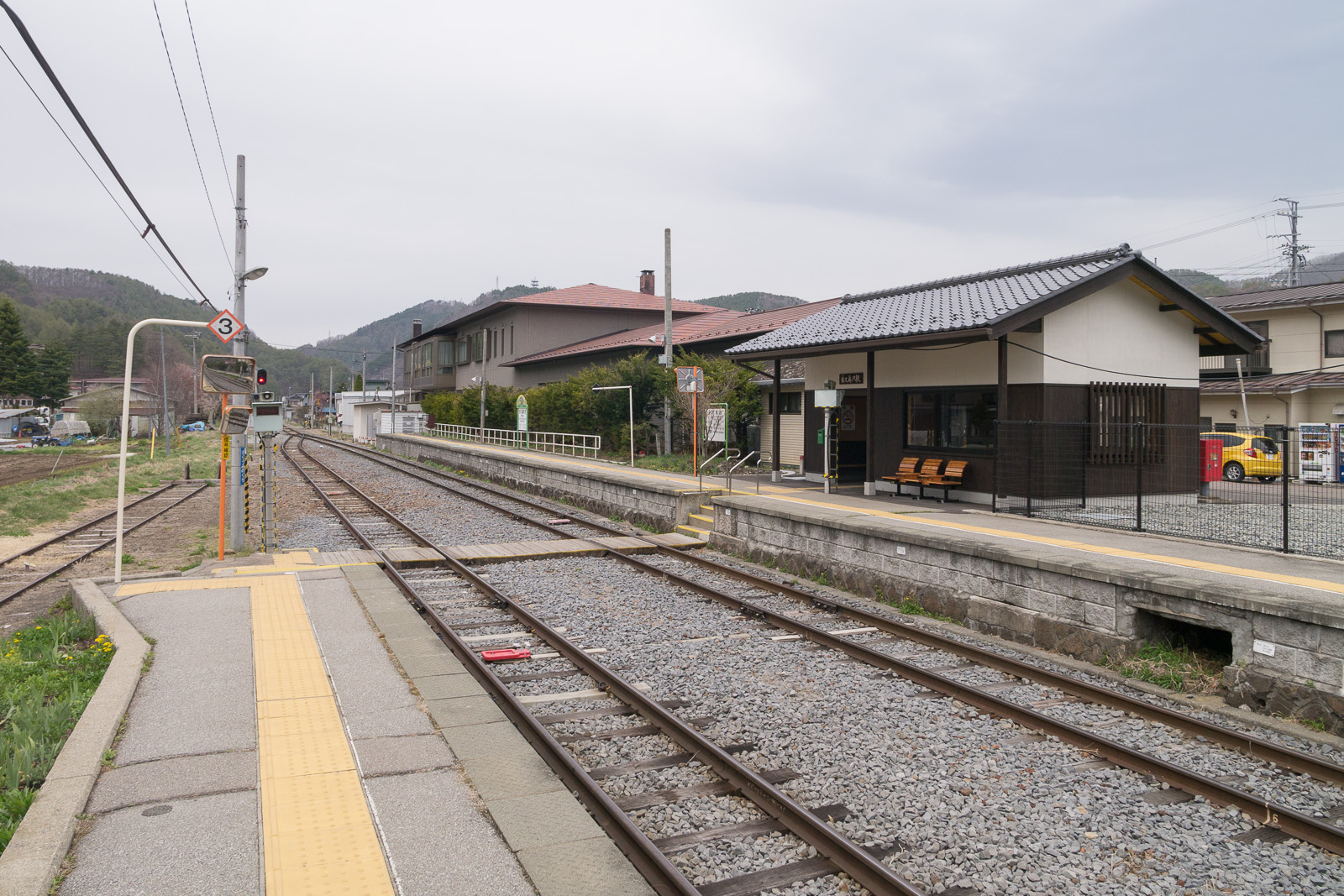
Station building, April 2013

Saku-Uminokuchi Station (佐久海ノ口駅, Saku-Uminokuchi-eki) is a train station in Uminokuchi in the village of Minamimaki, Minamisaku District, Nagano Prefecture, Japan, operated by East Japan Railway Company (JR East).

== Lines ==
Saku-Uminokuchi Station is served by the Koumi Line and is 39.7 kilometers from the terminus of the line at Kobuchizawa Station.

== Station layout ==
The station consists of two opposed ground-level side platforms serving two tracks, connected to the wooden station building by a level crossing. The station is unattended.

=== Platforms ===
station side	■ Koumi Line	for Kiyosato and Kobuchizawa
opp side	■ Koumi Line	for Koumi and Komoro

== History ==
Saku-Uminokuchi Station opened on 27 December 1932. With the privatization of Japanese National Railways (JNR) on 1 April 1987, the station came under the control of JR East. The current station building was completed in 2012.

== Surrounding area ==
- Uminokuchi Post Office
- Chikuma River
- National Route 14

== See also ==
- List of railway stations in Japan
- Uminokuchi Station - a railway station on the Ōito Line, East Japan Railway Company (JR East), in Taira in the city of Ōmachi, Nagano Prefecture, Japan.
