= Yadegawa ruins =

Japanese Paleolithic settlement

Yadegawa Ruins
- 矢出川遺跡 (Japanese)
- Yadegawa Ruins Yadegawa ruins (Japan)
- 35°56′46″N 138°29′02″E
- Type: settlement
- Periods: Japanese Paleolithic
- Location: Minamimaki, Nagano, Japan
- Region: Chūbu region

Site notes
- Elevation: 1,350 m (4,430 ft)
- Public access: No public facilities

The Yadegawa Ruins (矢出川遺跡, Yadegawa iseki) is an archaeological site containing the ruins of a late Japanese Paleolithic period (approximately 12,000 BCE) settlement located in what is now the village of Minamimaki, Nagano in the Chūbu region of Japan. It was designated a National Historic Site of Japan in 1995.

== Overview ==
The site is located on the left bank of the Yade River, a tributary of the Chikuma River, at the end of the Nobeyama Plateau which extends to the southeastern foot of Mount Yatsugatake. The site is at an elevation of over 1300 meters. It was discovered in 1953 and excavated by Japanese archeologist Chosuke Serizawa, who identified it as the first microlithic cultural site to be found in Japan. During the Upper Paleolithic period, roughly until 13,000 years ago, the shapes and types of stone tools, such as stone axes, spears, and microlith blades evolved due to rapid changes in the environment, which resulted in changes in the fauna available for hunting. Microliths, thin and razor-shape blades of stone which were used by embedding into shafts of wood or bone, appears towards the end of the Upper Paleolithic.

The site was subsequently excavated in 1954, 1963, and 1981, and many microlith blades, microlith cores, and carvings, scrapers, and many finely-sharpened stone blades made of obsidian were discovered. The relics have been excavated from a depth of about 20 centimeters. Of the 1792 rare stone blades discovered in Japan, 781 are from this site. From the large amount of knapping debris remaining in the area, it is believed that the site was a production area for stone blades over many years. Numerous ruins extend on both banks of the Yadegawa River over a three kilometer length, forming one of the largest archaeological sites centered on the end of the pre-earthenware era in Japan . The 1983 survey classified these ruins into ten groups with 68 sites and estimated that the settlements date from around 14,000 years ago.

Although sources of obsidian are common in the area, the discovery of many obsidian artifacts using obsidian from Kōzushima in the Izu Islands has posed a major mystery for archaeologists.

The site is now an empty field with a signpost; however, some of the artifacts discovered are on display at the Minamimaki Village Art and Folklore Museum (南牧村美術民俗資料館, Minamimakimura bijutsu minzoku shiryōkan), approximately two minutes on foot from Nobeyama Station on the Koumi Line.

== See also ==
- List of Historic Sites of Japan (Nagano)
