= Minamimaki, Nagano =

Minamimaki 南牧村
- Village
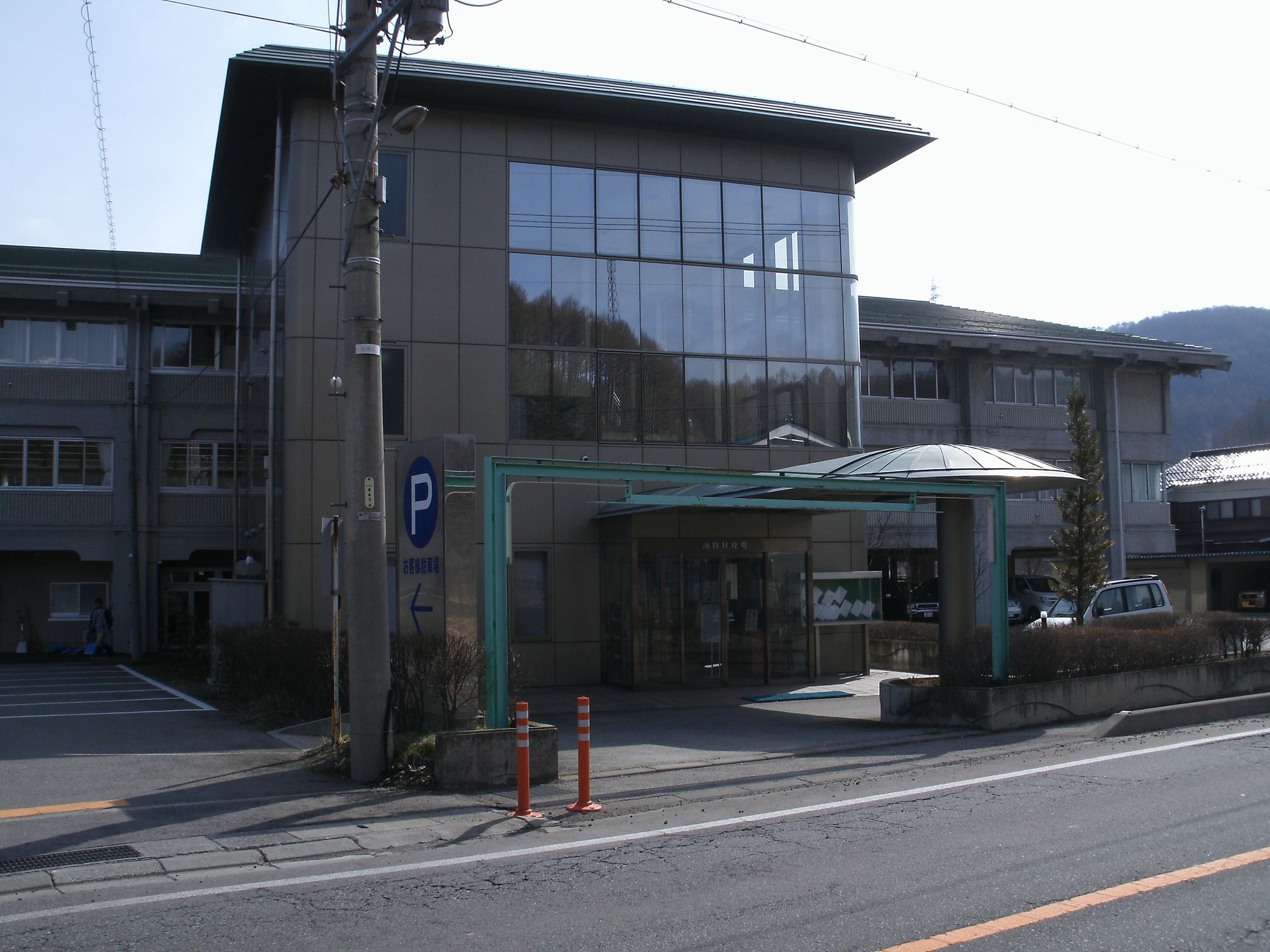
- Minamimaki Village Hall

- Flag Seal

- Location of Minamimaki in Nagano Prefecture

- Coordinates: 36°1′15″N 138°29′31.7″E
- Country: Japan
- Region: Chūbu (Kōshin'etsu)
- Prefecture: Nagano
- District: Minamisaku

Area
  - Total: 133.09 km^{2} (51.39 sq mi)

Population (April 2019)
  - Total: 2,924
  - Density: 21.97/km^{2} (56.90/sq mi)
- Time zone: UTC+9 (Japan Standard Time)
- Phone number: 0267-78-2121
- Address: 1051 Uminokuchi Minamimaki-mura, Minamisaku-gun, Nagano-ken 384-1211
- Climate: Dfb
- Website: http://www.minamimakimura.jp/
- Symbols
- Bird: Eurasian skylark
- Flower: Lily of the valley
- Tree: Prunus serrulata

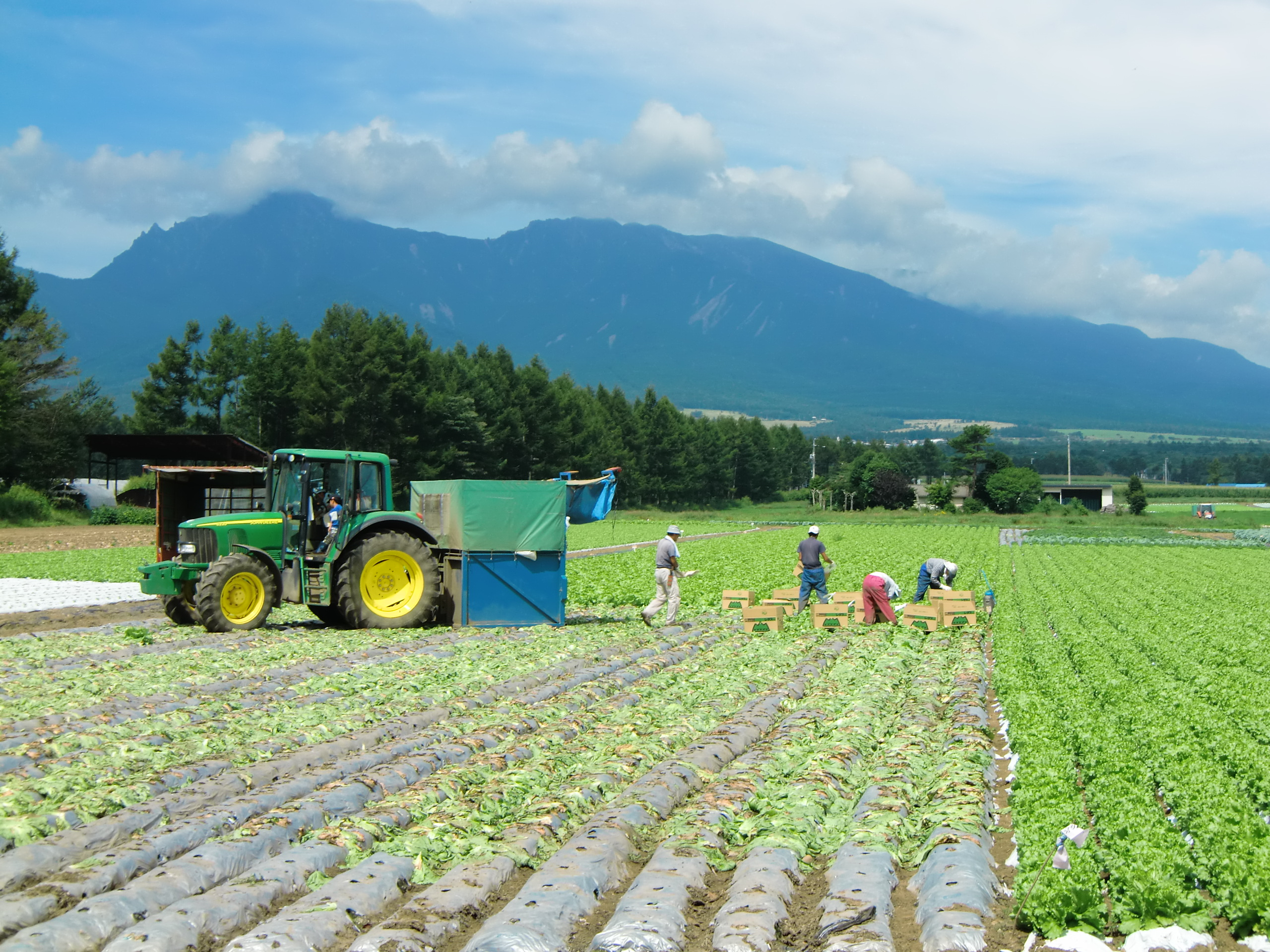
Rural scene in Minamimaki village

Minamimaki (南牧村, Minamimaki-mura) is a village located in Nagano Prefecture, Japan.

== Population ==
As of 1 April 2019, the village had an estimated population of 2,924 in 1,091 households and a population density of 22 persons per km^{2}. The total area of the village is 133.09 square kilometres (51.39 sq mi).

=== Historical population ===
Per Japanese census data, the population of Minamimaki has remained relatively steady over the past 50 years.

Historical population
Year	Pop.	±%
1940	3,029	—
1950	4,087	+34.9%
1960	4,112	+0.6%
1970	3,604	−12.4%
1980	3,435	−4.7%
1990	3,582	+4.3%
2000	3,540	−1.2%
2010	3,528	−0.3%
2020	3,242	−8.1%

== History ==
The area of present-day Minamimaki was part of ancient Shinano Province. The modern village of Minamimaki was created with the establishment of the municipalities system on April 1, 1889.

== Transportation ==
=== Railway ===
- East Japan Railway Company - Koumi Line
  - Nobeyama - < Shinano-Kawakami > - Saku-Hirose - Umijiri

=== Highway ===
- National Route 141

== Geography ==
Minamimaki is located in the Southern Yatsugatake Volcanic Group of the mountainous eastern Nagano Prefecture at an average altitude of between 1,000 and 1,500 meters. It is bordered by Yamanashi Prefecture to the south.

=== Surrounding municipalities ===
- Nagano Prefecture
  - Chino
  - Koumi
  - Kawakami
  - Minamiaiki
- Yamanashi Prefecture
  - Hokuto

== Climate ==
The village has a humid continental climate characterized by warm and humid summers and cold winters with heavy snowfall (Köppen climate classification Dfb). The average annual temperature in Minamimaki is 7.2 °C (45.0 °F). The average annual rainfall is 1,432.4 mm (56.39 in), and July is the wettest month. The temperatures are highest on average in August, at around 19.5 °C (67.1 °F), and lowest in January, at around −5.3 °C (22.5 °F).

Climate data for Nobeyama, Minamimaki (1991–2020 normals, extremes 1978–present)
Month	Jan	Feb	Mar	Apr	May	Jun	Jul	Aug	Sep	Oct	Nov	Dec	Year
Record high °C (°F)	11.9 (53.4)	17.2 (63.0)	20.1 (68.2)	24.9 (76.8)	26.7 (80.1)	30.8 (87.4)	30.7 (87.3)	31.0 (87.8)	29.1 (84.4)	24.9 (76.8)	21.5 (70.7)	16.9 (62.4)	31.0 (87.8)
Mean daily maximum °C (°F)	0.1 (32.2)	1.1 (34.0)	5.4 (41.7)	12.1 (53.8)	17.2 (63.0)	19.9 (67.8)	23.7 (74.7)	24.7 (76.5)	20.3 (68.5)	14.7 (58.5)	9.3 (48.7)	3.8 (38.8)	12.7 (54.9)
Daily mean °C (°F)	−5.3 (22.5)	−4.5 (23.9)	−0.3 (31.5)	5.8 (42.4)	11.0 (51.8)	14.8 (58.6)	18.9 (66.0)	19.5 (67.1)	15.5 (59.9)	9.3 (48.7)	3.8 (38.8)	−1.9 (28.6)	7.2 (45.0)
Mean daily minimum °C (°F)	−12.2 (10.0)	−11.4 (11.5)	−6.4 (20.5)	−0.6 (30.9)	4.9 (40.8)	10.2 (50.4)	15.0 (59.0)	15.5 (59.9)	11.4 (52.5)	4.4 (39.9)	−1.8 (28.8)	−7.9 (17.8)	1.8 (35.2)
Record low °C (°F)	−25.1 (−13.2)	−26.0 (−14.8)	−25.3 (−13.5)	−18.7 (−1.7)	−6.6 (20.1)	−1.4 (29.5)	4.8 (40.6)	4.2 (39.6)	−2.2 (28.0)	−8.9 (16.0)	−14.1 (6.6)	−23.1 (−9.6)	−26.0 (−14.8)
Average precipitation mm (inches)	46.6 (1.83)	49.8 (1.96)	93.4 (3.68)	100.6 (3.96)	124.9 (4.92)	172.6 (6.80)	205.6 (8.09)	166.8 (6.57)	204.1 (8.04)	164.6 (6.48)	62.4 (2.46)	41.0 (1.61)	1,432.4 (56.39)
Average precipitation days (≥ 1.0 mm)	6.1	6.1	9.7	9.8	10.9	13.7	15.1	13.0	11.9	10.0	7.0	5.8	119.1
Mean monthly sunshine hours	175.7	167.1	179.8	188.3	186.0	127.7	142.2	160.1	124.1	140.2	167.9	175.5	1,933.7
Source: Japan Meteorological Agency (1991–2020 normals, extremes 1978–present)

== Local attractions ==
- Nobeyama radio observatory
- Yadegawa ruins, a Japanese Paleolithic period trace and National Historic Site
