= Nobeyama Station =

Railway station in Minamimaki, Nagano Prefecture, Japan

Nobeyama Station 野辺山駅
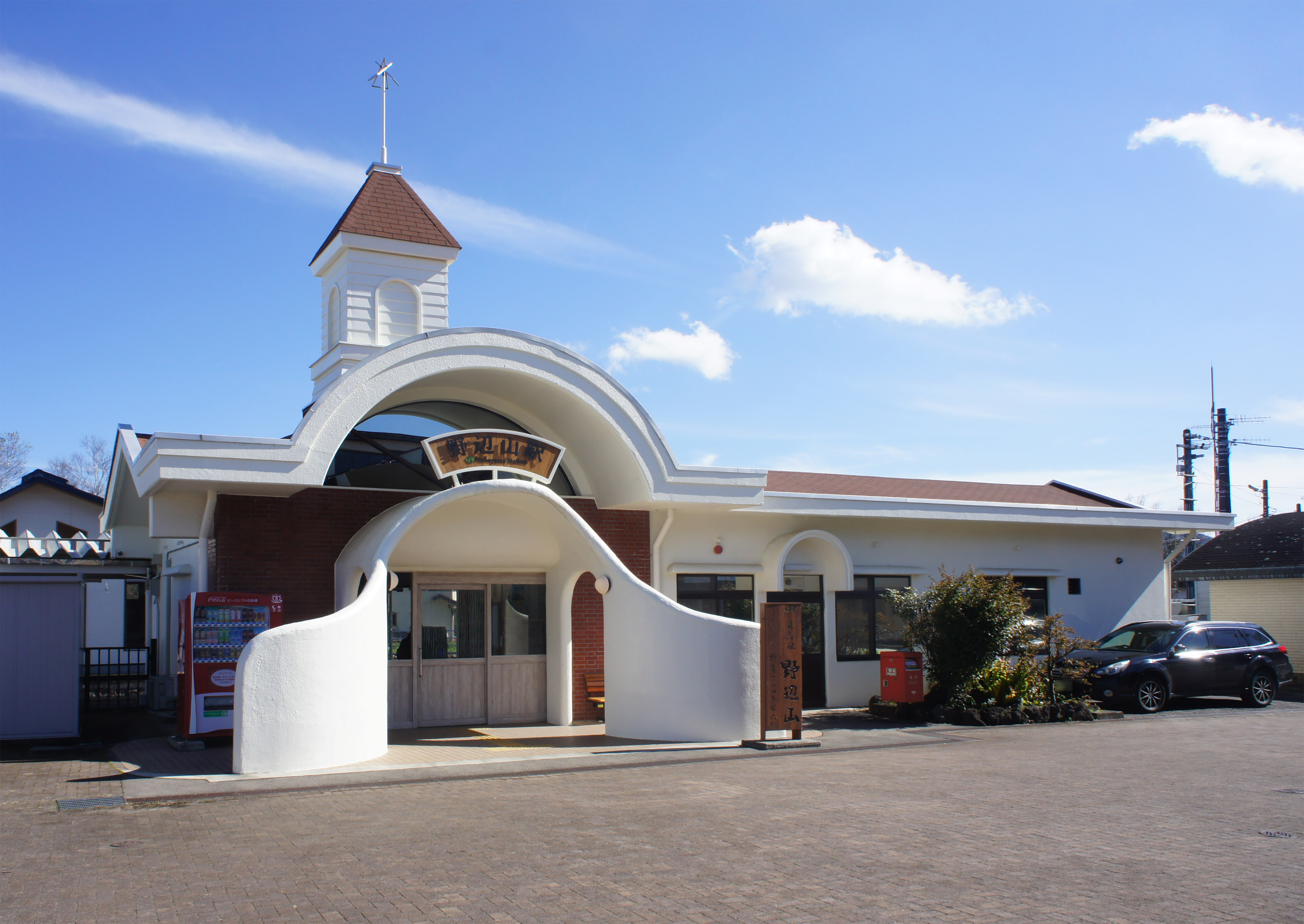
- Nobeyama Station in October 2021

General information
- Location: 306 Nobeyama, Minamimaki Village, Minamisaku District, Nagano Prefecture 384-1305; Japan
- Coordinates: 35°57′19″N 138°28′28″E
- Elevation: 1,345.67 m (4,414 ft 11 in)
- Operator: JR East
- Line: Koumi Line
- Distance: 23.4 km (14.5 mi) from Kobuchizawa
- Platforms: 1 side + 1 island platform
- Tracks: 3

Construction
- Structure type: At grade

Other information
- Status: Staffed (Midori no Madoguchi)
- Website: Official website

History
- Opened: 29 November 1935; 90 years ago
- Rebuilt: 16 March 1983; 43 years ago

Passengers
- FY2021: 84 daily

Services
| Preceding station | JR East | Following station |
|---|---|---|
| Shinano-Kawakami towards Komoro | Koumi Line | Kiyosato towards Kobuchizawa |
Location
- Location within Nagano Prefecture Location within Chubu region Location within Japan

Nobeyama Station (野辺山駅, Nobeyama-eki) is a railway station on the Koumi Line in the village of Minamimaki in Nagano Prefecture, Japan, operated by the East Japan Railway Company (JR East). The station is the highest JR station in Japan.

== Lines ==
Nobeyama Station is served by the 78.9 km (49.0 mi) Koumi Line and is 23.4 km (14.5 mi) from the starting point of the line at Kobuchizawa Station.

== Station layout ==
The station consists of one side platform and one island platform, serving three tracks, connected by a level crossing. The station has a Midori no Madoguchi staffed ticket office. A sign on the platform proclaims it to be the highest JR station in Japan, located at 1,345.67 m (4,414.9 ft) above sea level.

=== Platforms ===
| 1 | ■ Koumi Line | for Sakudaira and Komoro |
| 2 | ■ Koumi Line | for Kiyosato and Kobuchizawa |
| 3 | ■ Koumi Line | (passing loop) |

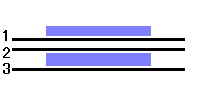
→:for Komuro
←:for Kobuchizawa

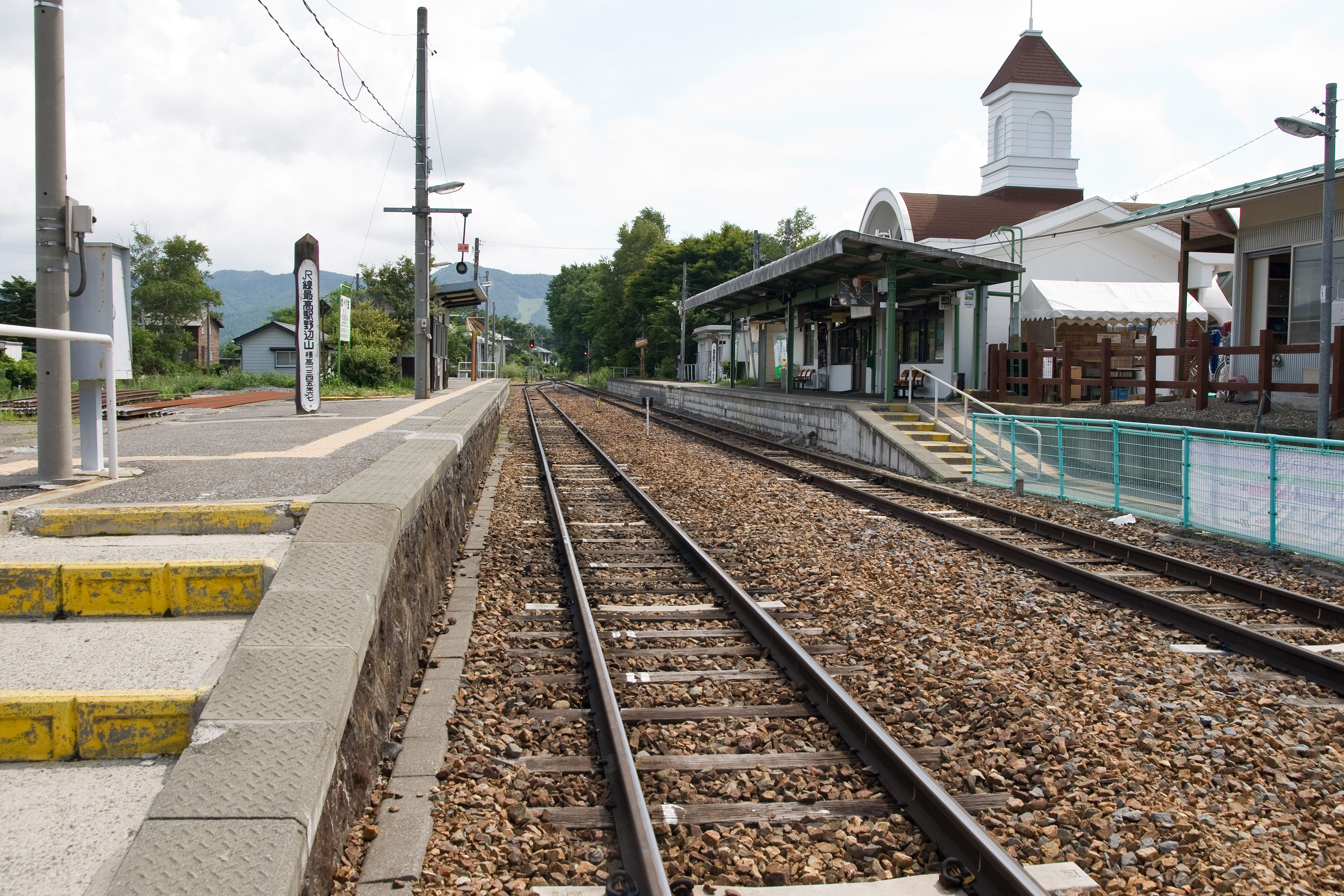
The platforms in August 2011

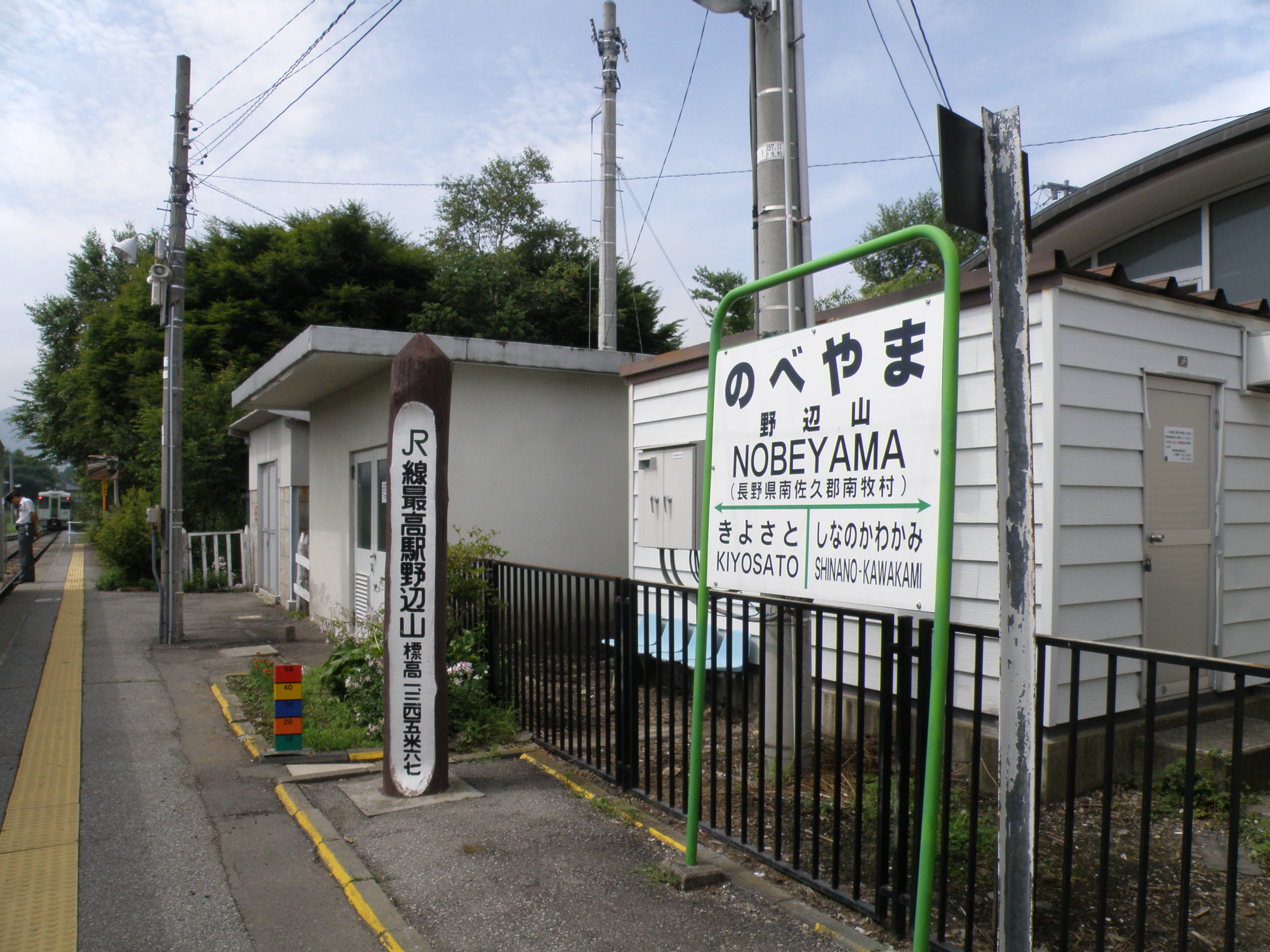
The platform in August 2008, with the sign indicating the altitude of 1,345.67 m above sea level

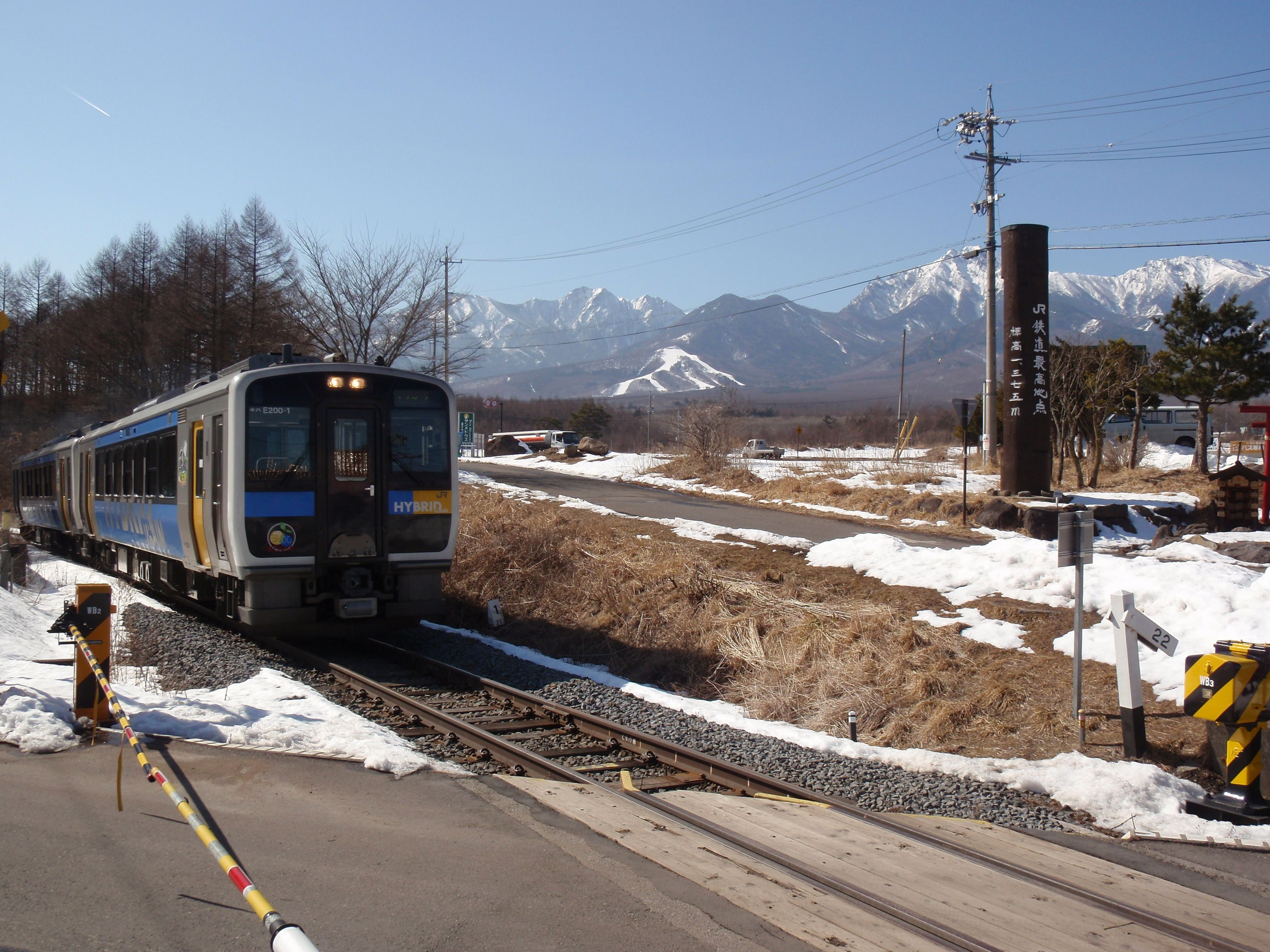
Marker on the right indicating the highest point operated within the JR Group, February 2011

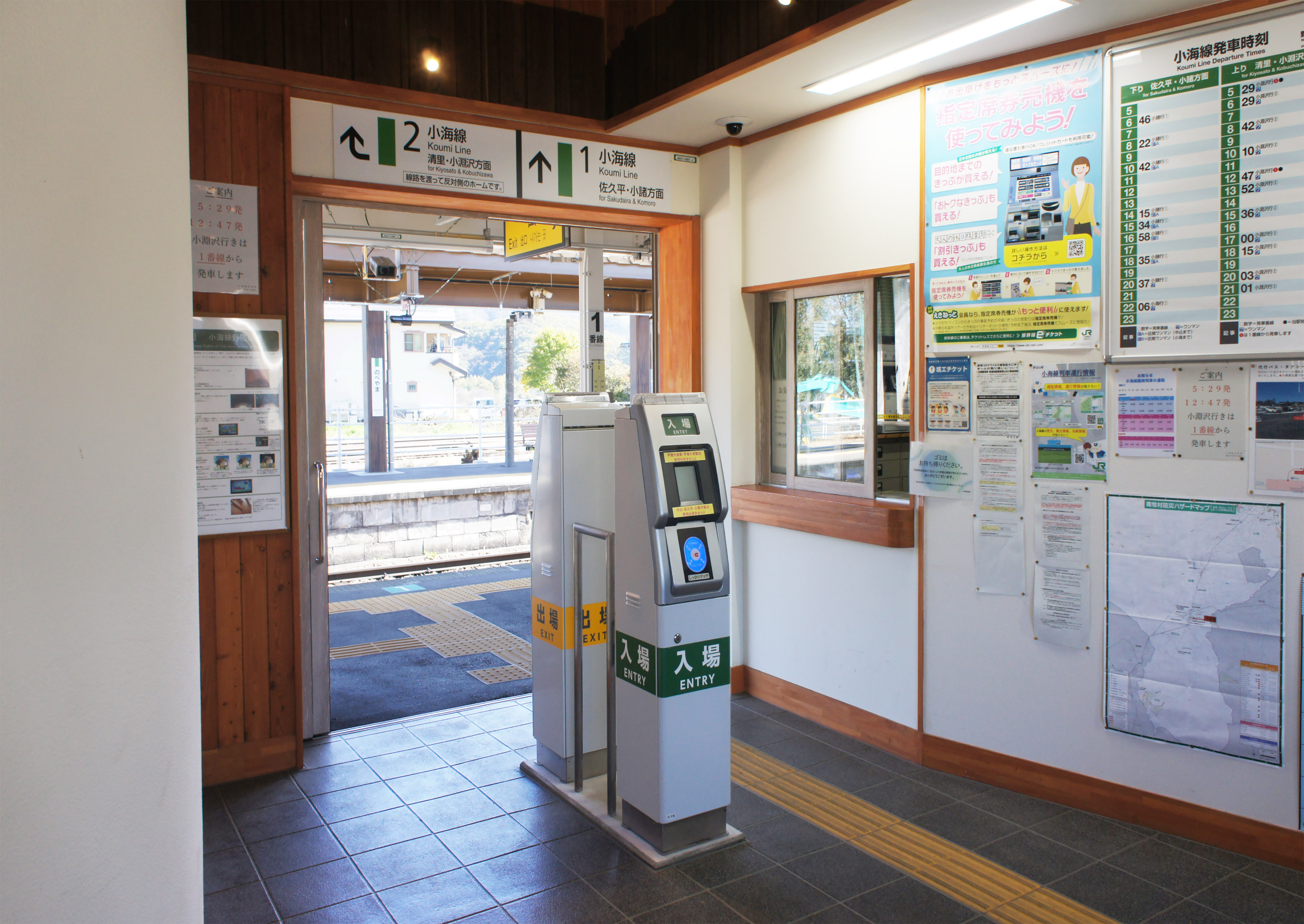
Fare validation machines

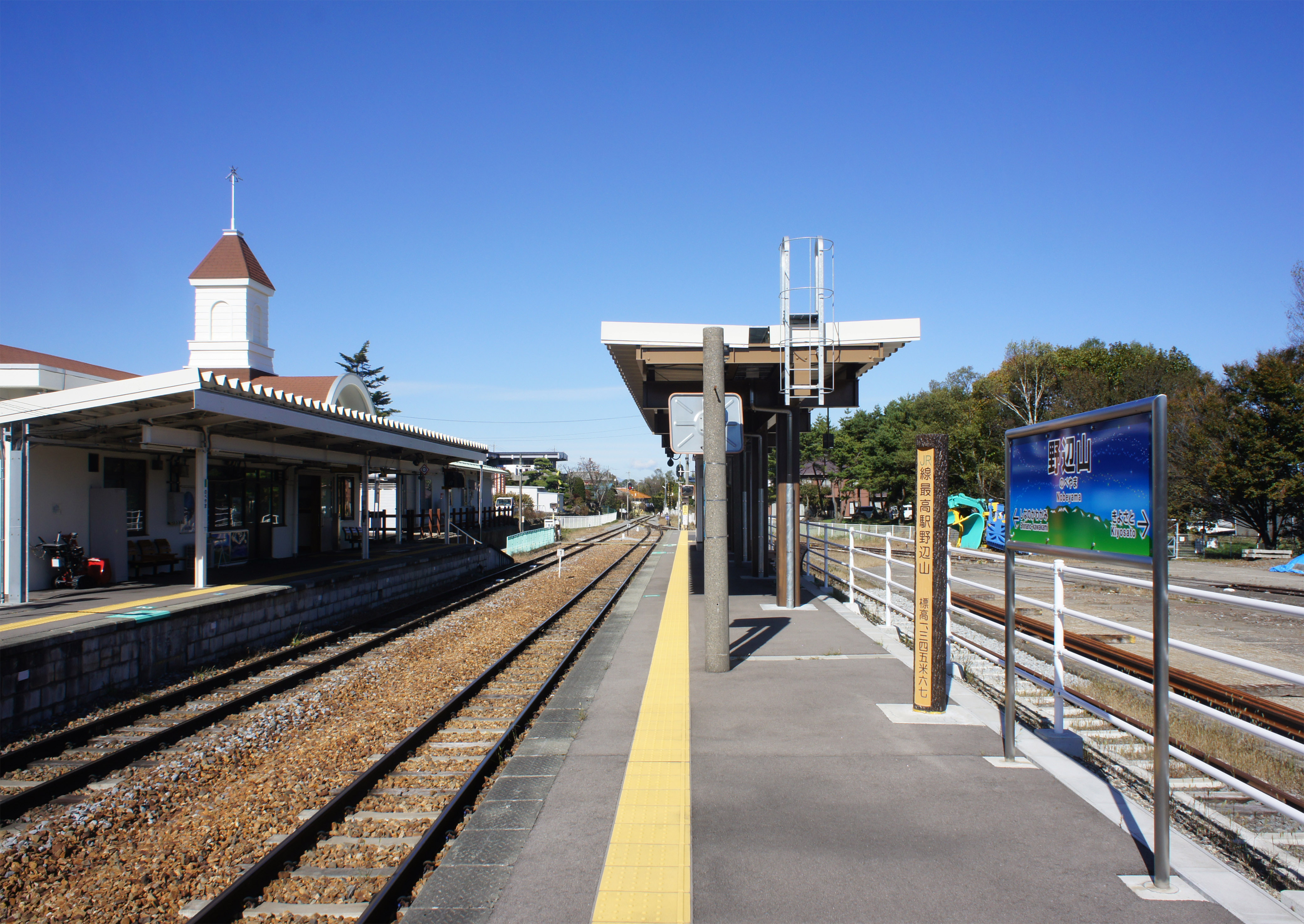
Platforms, October 2021

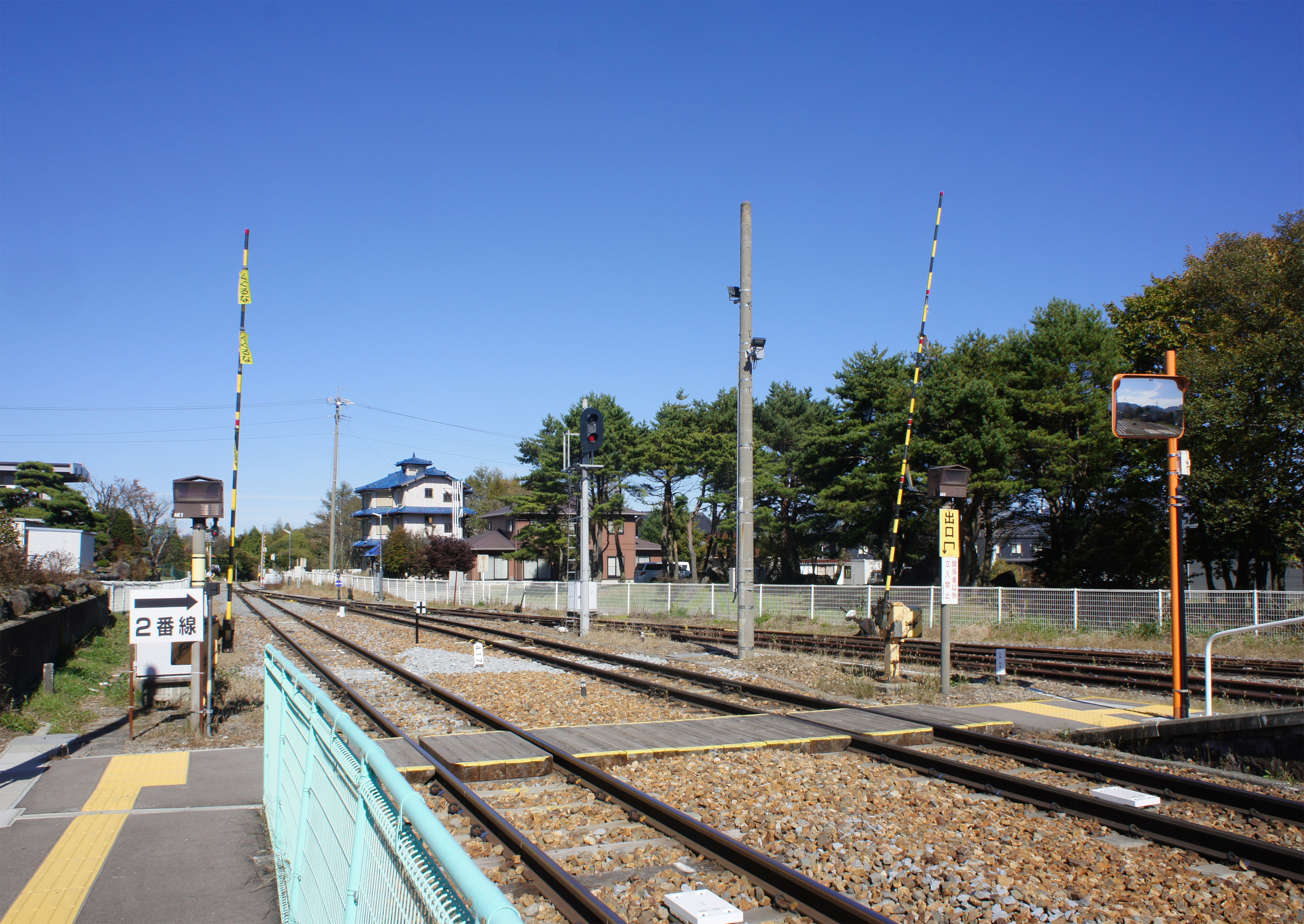
Pedestrian crossing, October 2021

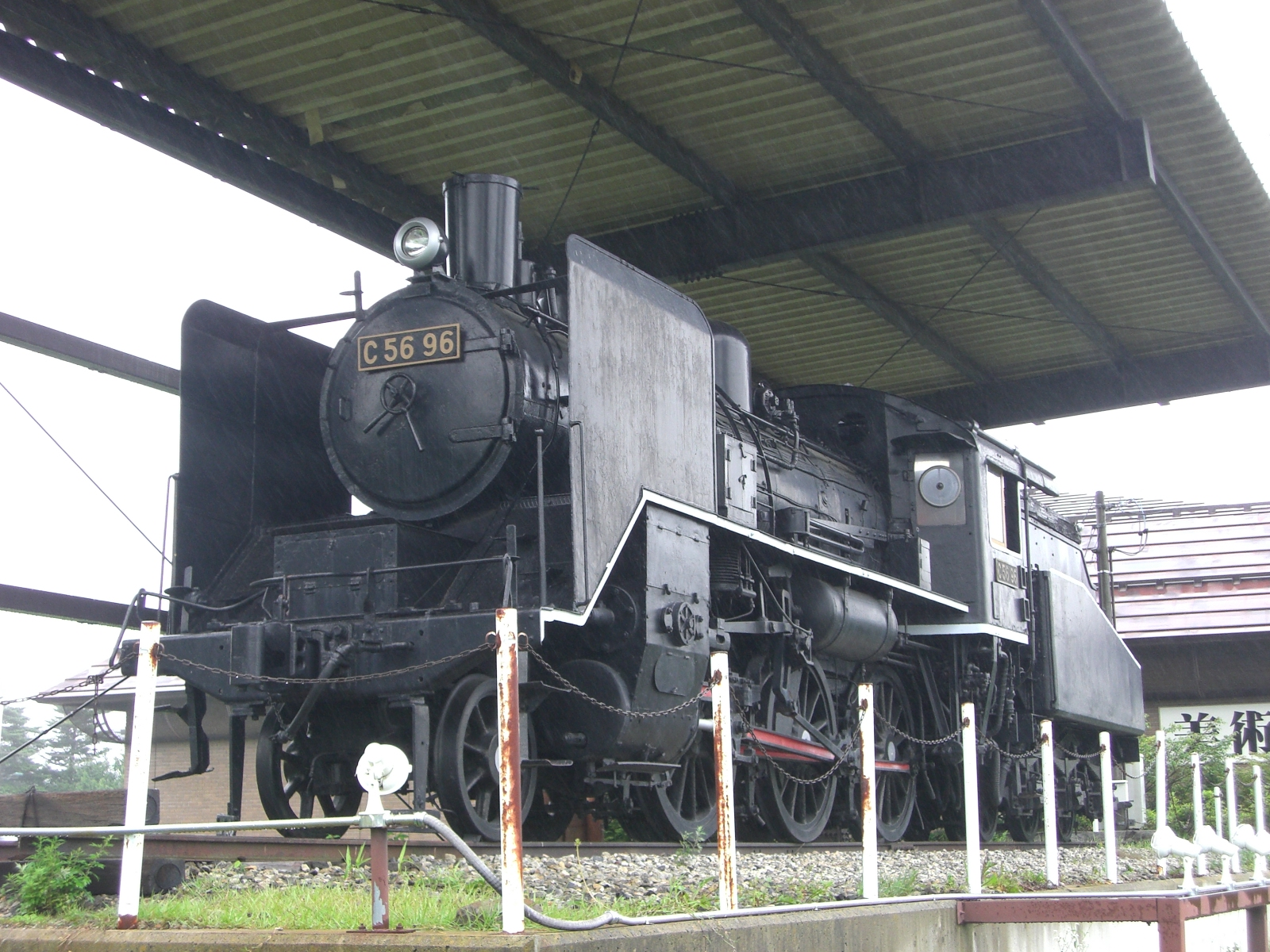
C56 96 in Ginga Park next to the station, August 2009

== History ==
Nobeyama Station opened on 29 November 1935. With the privatization of Japanese National Railways (JNR) on 1 April 1987, the station came under the control of JR East. The current station building was completed in March 1983.

== Passenger statistics ==
In fiscal 2015, the station was used by an average of 165 passengers daily (boarding passengers only).

== Surrounding area ==
- Nobeyama radio observatory
- National Route 141
- Nobeyama SL Land

== See also ==
- List of railway stations in Japan
- Murodō Station (the highest altitude station in Japan)
- Yoshioka-Kaitei Station (deepest underground station in Japan)
- Yatomi Station (overground station with the lowest altitude in Japan)
