= Kawakami Inu =

Japanese dog breed

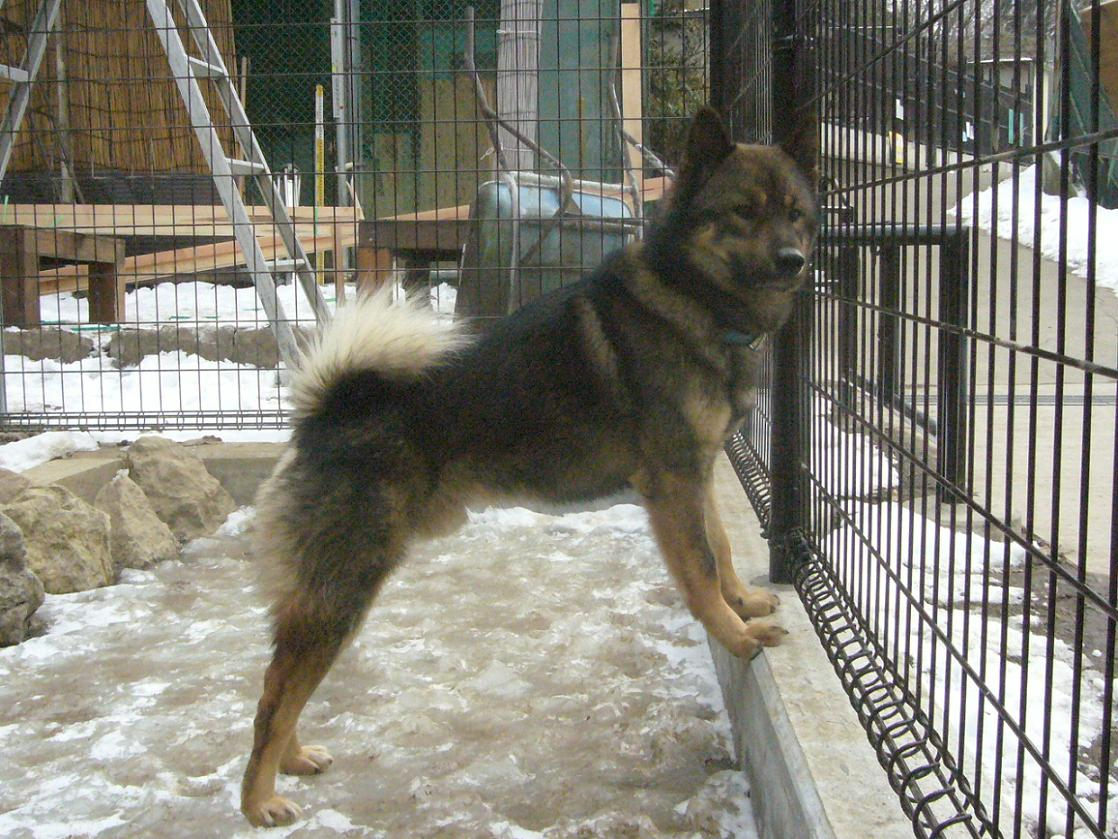
- Kawakami dog bred at Suzaka Zoo in Nagano Prefecture
- Other names: Kawakami Ken, Kawakami Dog
- Origin: Japan
Traits
Height	Males	15–18 in (38–45 cm)
	Females	14–17 in (35–42 cm)
- Color: black, brown, red, and white.

The Kawakami Inu (Japanese: 川上犬) is a small, Japanese dog breed originating in Kawakami Village, Minamisaku District, Nagano Prefecture. It is considered to be a type of Shiba Inu and is designated as a natural monument of Nagano Prefecture.

The legend of the Kawakami Inu's origin tells how hunters tamed the wild wolves of the Chichibu Mountains, and all Kawakami Inu are thus related to the now extinct Japanese wolf. Because of this, it is believed that a Kawakami Inu will confront an opponent larger than itself. One story tells of a Kawakami Inu that protected its owner from a bear.

== History ==
In the Edo and Meiji periods, the harsh climate and mountainous terrain of Kawakami Village made it unsuitable for agriculture. Because of this, they needed a hunting dog that could easily hunt in rocky areas with cliffs. To hunt antelope, the dogs needed equal or greater agility. To hunt in rocky areas, the dogs needed strong paws that would allow them to traverse these areas without harming themselves. These are traits the Kawakami Inu was bred for. In 1924, during the Taisho period, around 70 Kawakami dogs were living in Kawakami Village. That year the village was visited by the head of the Ministry of Home Affairs, who went to see the Kawakami Inu, after a decline of purebred Japanese dog breeds. This visit led to the Kawakami Inu being declared a Natural Monument. After the declaration, preservation activities for the Kawakami Inu increased, and a preservation society was formed.

Due to the newly opened Koumi Line and a thriving forestry industry during the Showa period, Kawakami village no longer relied on hunting for survival. Many people stopped hunting and no longer needed hunting dogs. Western dogs became more popular as pets, and thus the purebred kawakami inu went into decline. During World War II, owners of purebred Kawakami Inu became concerned that their dogs might be killed, and took them to the mountains of Yatsugatake. Their purebred Kawakami Inu were sold to the people living there, who restarted the efforts to restore the breed. The war pushed many people into poverty, after the war had ended they had to pay a lot of money to buy back their dogs. Despite the hardships, there was a revival in breeding activities. However, due to the decrease in purebred Kawakami dogs, in 1965 their status as a natural monument was revoked.

In the years after 1975, the villagers managed to increase the population of Kawakami Inu to 30 in Kawakami Village, and to 200-300 in the rest of Japan. The momentum for protecting the breed remained high in the village, because of the many roadblocks the dogs have faced, a system for protecting the native dog of Kawakami was implemented, including allowing elementary school students to help raise the dogs. Due to the efforts of the villagers and the preservation society, the Kawakami Inu was redesignated as a Natural Monument in 1983.

In the year of the dog, 2006, the Kawakami Inu was chosen as the representative for the 'exhibition of the Chinese zodiac' at Ueno Zoological Gardens in Tokyo, and three 3 month old puppies were exhibited. The Kawakami Inu was chosen due to its history of being killed during the war, like the other animals exhibited at Ueno Zoo. There is also a possible population of Kawakami Inu in Taiwan. A few dogs were taken to Taiwan in the 1990s, where they were employed to guard hydroelectric power plants. In 1999 there were said to be around 10 Kawakami Inu in Taiwan. The number of Kawakami Inu born per year was 137 between 2012 and 2021, however the number started to decline again starting around 2018.

== Characteristics ==
The face of a Kawakami Inu

The Kawakami Inu is a medium sized spitz type dog, closely related to the Shiba Inu, the height at the withers is around 35-45cm. They are a double coated breed with short, dense fur, the accepted coat colours are red, black, white, and brown. The Kawakami Inu has a more wolf-like face than the Shiba Inu, its eyes are a dark reddish-brown.

The Kawakami Inu is described as fearless and loyal. They are smart dogs but they are not friendly towards everyone and can be cautious and aggressive towards strangers, these traits make it a good guard or watch dog. They are not quiet dogs and will bark a lot. They have a stubborn personality and may misbehave if they do not respect and trust their owners.

They are very energetic dogs and require a lot of exercise. A male Kawakami dog can jump 2 meters without running. They have a strong homecoming instinct.

== Health ==
The Kawakami dog can survive in the extreme winter temperatures of Kawakami Village, which can go below -25°C, however, they do not do well in heat and shouldn’t be kept in hot and humid places.

Yamazaki Gakuen University did research into mitochondrial D-loop region sequencing in Akita Inu and Kawakami Inu.

== Controversies ==
The Kawakami Inu Preservation Society has been the subject of controversy in 2010 and 2015, due to forging pedigrees, crossbreeding, and inbreeding.

== In popular culture ==
The Kawakami Village mascot ’Retasuke’ (Japanese: レタ助) is a Kawakami Inu combined with a lettuce, two things important to Kawakami Village.

== See also ==
- Shiba Inu

== Books ==
- 川上犬物語 - 久能靖 - May 30, 2007
