= Umijiri Station =

Railway station in Minamimaki, Nagano Prefecture, Japan

Umijiri Station 海尻駅
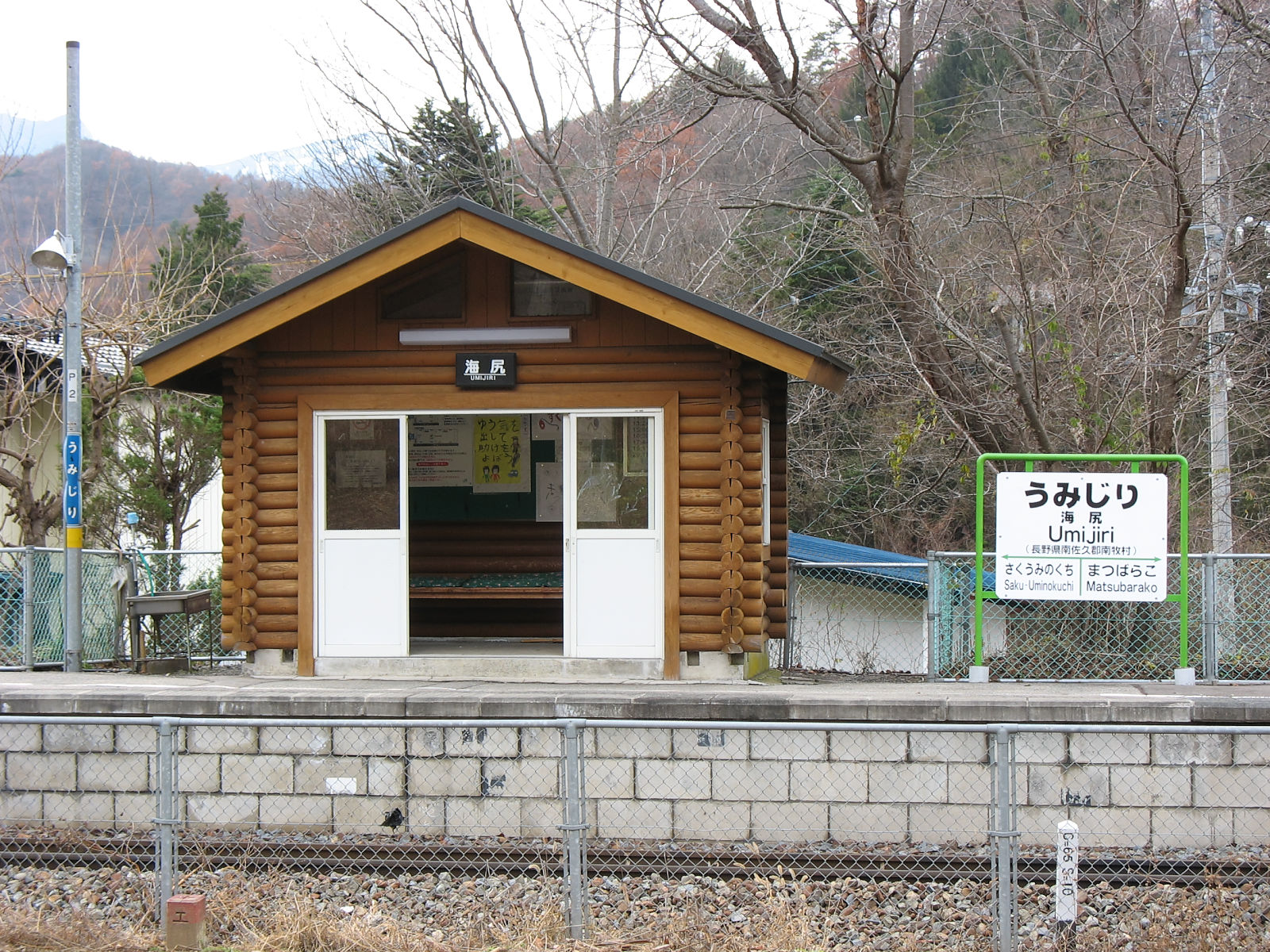
- Umijiri Station, November 2006

General information
- Location: Umijiri, Minamimaki-mura, Minamisaku-gun, Nagano-ken 384-1301; Japan
- Coordinates: 36.0411°N 138.4738°E
- Elevation: 1034.8 meters
- Operator: JR East
- Line: ■ Koumi Line
- Distance: 42.1 km from Kobuchizawa
- Platforms: 1 side platform

Other information
- Status: Unstaffed
- Website: Official website

History
- Opened: 27 December 1932

Services
Preceding station	JR East	Following station
Matsubarako towards Komoro	Koumi Line	Saku-Uminokuchi towards Kobuchizawa
Location
- Location within Nagano Prefecture Location within Japan

Umijiri Station (海尻駅, Umijiri-eki) is a train station in Uminokuchi in the village of Minamimaki, Minamisaku District, Nagano Prefecture, Japan, operated by East Japan Railway Company (JR East).

== Lines ==
Umijiri Station is served by the Koumi Line and is 42.1 kilometers from the terminus of the line at Kobuchizawa Station.

== Station layout ==
The station consists of one ground-level side platform serving a single bi-directional track. The station is unattended.

== History ==
Umijiri Station opened on 27 December 1932. With the privatization of Japanese National Railways (JNR) on 1 April 1987, the station came under the control of JR East.

== Surrounding area ==
- Chikuma River
- National Route 141

== See also ==
- List of railway stations in Japan
