= Kawakami, Nagano =

Kawakami 川上村
- Village
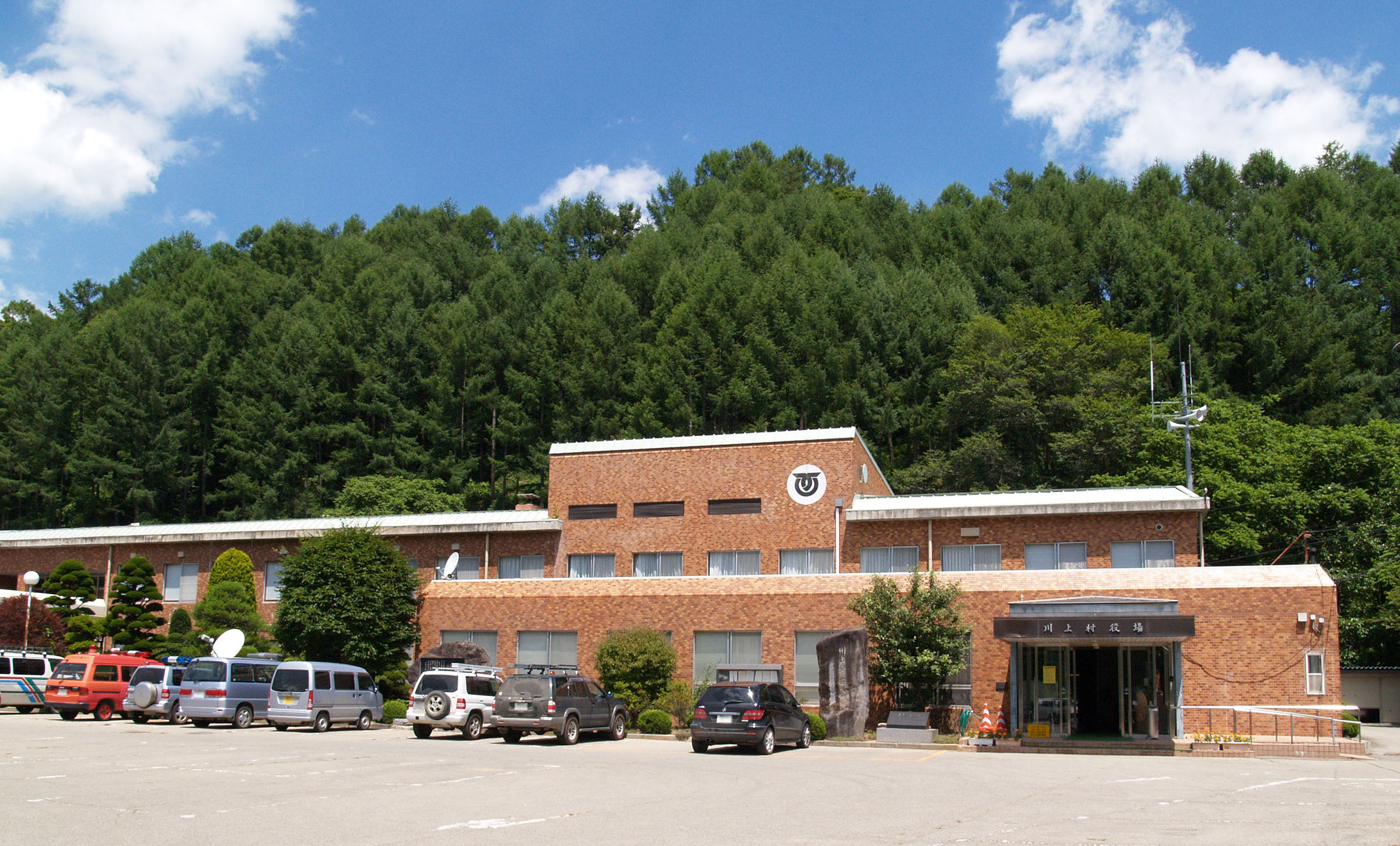
- Kawakami Village Hall

- Flag Seal

- Location of Kawakami in Nagano Prefecture

- Coordinates: 35°58′24″N 138°34′33″E
- Country: Japan
- Region: Chūbu (Kōshin'etsu)
- Prefecture: Nagano
- District: Minamisaku

Area
  - Total: 209.61 km^{2} (80.93 sq mi)

Population (April 2019)
  - Total: 4,009
  - Density: 19.13/km^{2} (49.54/sq mi)
- Time zone: UTC+9 (Japan Standard Time)
- Symbols
  - Tree: Larch
  - Flower: Rhododendron
  - Bird: Japanese bush warbler
- Phone number: 0267-78-2121
- Address: 525 Omiyama Kawakami-mura, Minamisaku-gun, Nagano-ken 384-1405
- Website: Official website

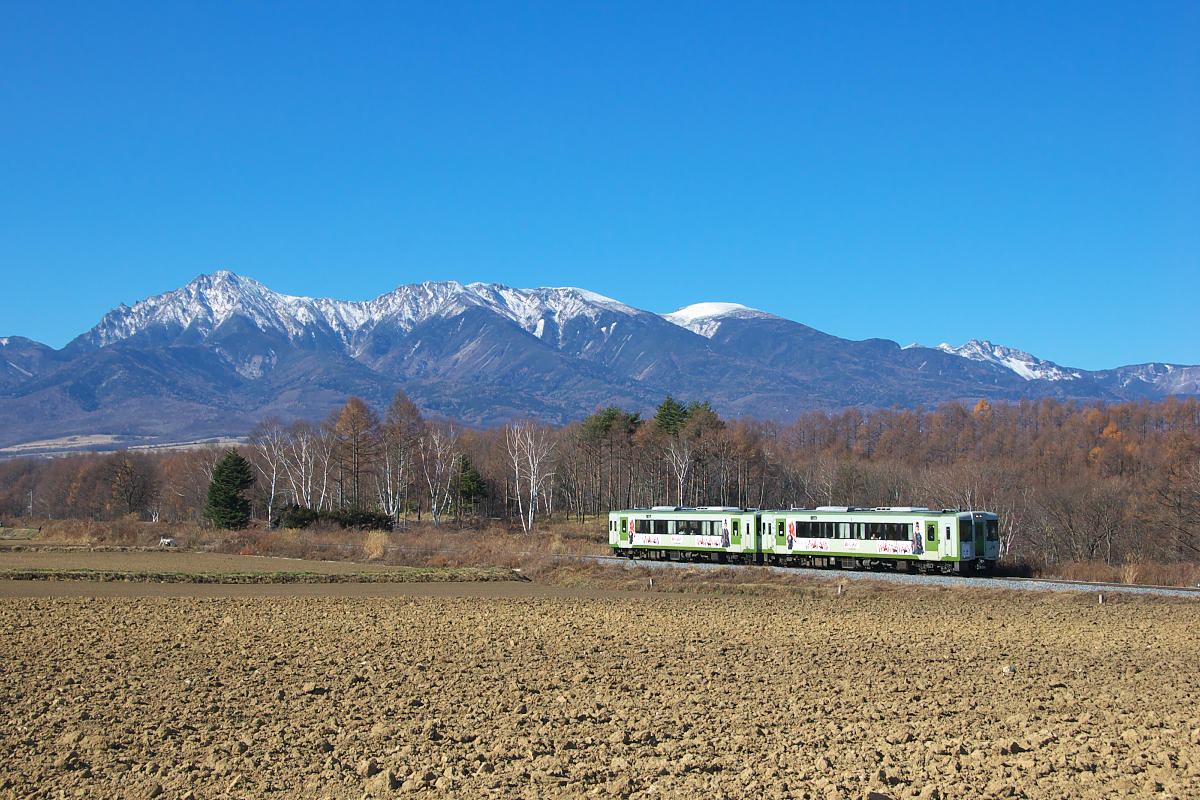
Mount Yatsugatake from Kawakami village

Kawakami (川上村, Kawakami-mura) is a village located in Nagano Prefecture, Japan. As of 1 April 2019, the village had an estimated population of 4,009 in 1419 households, and a population density of 19 persons per km^{2}. The total area of the village is 209.61 square kilometres (80.93 sq mi). The village office is located at an altitude of 1,185 meters, the highest of any municipality in Japan. Kawakami is famous for its lettuce, as well as the Kawakami breed of dogs, Kawakami Inu.

== Geography ==
Kawakami is located in mountainous eastern Nagano Prefecture, bordered by Yamanashi Prefecture to the south, Gunma Prefecture to the north and Saitama Prefecture to the east. Mount Kinpu (2499 meters) is partly located within this village. The source of the Chikuma River, the longest river in Japan, is in Kawakami. This fact is a point of local pride, as it appears in various school songs.

Much of the village is within the borders of the Chichibu Tama Kai National Park.

=== Surrounding municipalities ===
- Gunma Prefecture
  - Ueno
- Nagano Prefecture
  - Minamiaiki
  - Minamimaki
- Saitama Prefecture
  - Chichibu
- Yamanashi Prefecture
  - Hokuto
  - Kōfu
  - Yamanashi

=== Climate ===
The village has a humid continental climate characterized by cool summers, and cold, wet winters (Köppen climate classification Dfb). The average annual temperature in Kawakami is 4.7 °C. The average annual rainfall is 1954 mm with September as the wettest month. The temperatures are highest on average in August, at around 23.5 °C, and lowest in January, at around -1.3 °C.

Climate data for Kawakami Village (Akiyama)
Month	Jan	Feb	Mar	Apr	May	Jun	Jul	Aug	Sep	Oct	Nov	Dec	Year
Record high °C (°F)	14.1 (57.4)	16.5 (61.7)	23.0 (73.4)	28.2 (82.8)	29.6 (85.3)	29.1 (84.4)	31.4 (88.5)	33.0 (91.4)	31.7 (89.1)	26.8 (80.2)	22.8 (73.0)	17.0 (62.6)	33.0 (91.4)
Mean daily maximum °C (°F)	2.0 (35.6)	4.4 (39.9)	7.9 (46.2)	15.0 (59.0)	18.8 (65.8)	22.1 (71.8)	25.2 (77.4)	26.2 (79.2)	22.4 (72.3)	16.5 (61.7)	12.3 (54.1)	5.2 (41.4)	14.8 (58.6)
Daily mean °C (°F)	−4.8 (23.4)	−2.8 (27.0)	0.3 (32.5)	6.6 (43.9)	11.6 (52.9)	15.5 (59.9)	19.1 (66.4)	19.5 (67.1)	15.9 (60.6)	9.3 (48.7)	4.1 (39.4)	−1.6 (29.1)	7.7 (45.9)
Mean daily minimum °C (°F)	−10.9 (12.4)	−9.2 (15.4)	−6.1 (21.0)	−0.4 (31.3)	5.5 (41.9)	9.9 (49.8)	14.3 (57.7)	14.4 (57.9)	11.0 (51.8)	3.9 (39.0)	−1.6 (29.1)	−7.1 (19.2)	2.0 (35.6)
Record low °C (°F)	−18.1 (−0.6)	−17.7 (0.1)	−16.1 (3.0)	−9.3 (15.3)	−3.7 (25.3)	1.8 (35.2)	6.6 (43.9)	6.2 (43.2)	0.2 (32.4)	−4.8 (23.4)	−9.4 (15.1)	−18.7 (−1.7)	−18.7 (−1.7)
Average precipitation mm (inches)	21.2 (0.83)	29.9 (1.18)	52.6 (2.07)	50.7 (2.00)	72.4 (2.85)	91.4 (3.60)	147.3 (5.80)	104.6 (4.12)	147.0 (5.79)	130.3 (5.13)	46.7 (1.84)	35.9 (1.41)	929.8 (36.61)
Average precipitation days (≥ 1.0 mm)	2.5	4.9	6.2	6.8	7.8	8.1	11.7	7.9	7.2	7.5	5.1	4.0	79.7
Mean monthly sunshine hours	163.9	158.9	180.2	182.8	186.8	144.1	147.4	185.6	141.2	141.6	150.6	147.2	1,930.3
Mean daily sunshine hours	5.3	5.6	5.8	6.1	6.0	4.8	4.8	6.0	4.7	4.6	5.0	4.7	5.3
Source: Japan Meteorological Agency

== Demographics ==
Per Japanese census data, while remaining relatively stable historically, in recent years, the population of Kawakami has been declining.

Historical population
Year	Pop.	±%
1940	5,488	—
1950	5,900	+7.5%
1960	5,659	−4.1%
1970	4,739	−16.3%
1980	4,632	−2.3%
1990	4,722	+1.9%
2000	4,908	+3.9%
2010	4,974	+1.3%
2020	4,344	−12.7%

== History ==
The area of present-day Kawakami was part of ancient Shinano Province. Ruins from the Jomon period, Kofun period and Nara period have been found within the village borders, indicating continuous settlement for thousands of years. The present village of Kawakami was created with the establishment of the modern municipalities system on April 1, 1889.

== Economy ==
Agriculture, particularly the cultivation of lettuce, and forestry are mainstays of the local economy.

== Education ==
Kawakami has two public elementary schools and one public middle school operated by the village government. The village does not have a high school.

== Transportation ==
=== Railway ===
- East Japan Railway Company - Koumi Line
  - Shinano-Kawakami

=== Prefectural roads ===
- Nagano Prefectural Road Route 2
- Nagano Prefectural Road Route 68

== Local attractions ==
- Ōmiyama ruins, traces of a Jōmon-period settlement; a National Historic Site

== Notable people ==
- Aaamyyy - electronic musician and member of Tempalay.
- Kimiya Yui – JAXA astronaut
