= Matsubarako Station =

Railway station in Koumi, Nagano Prefecture, Japan

Matsubarako Station 松原湖駅
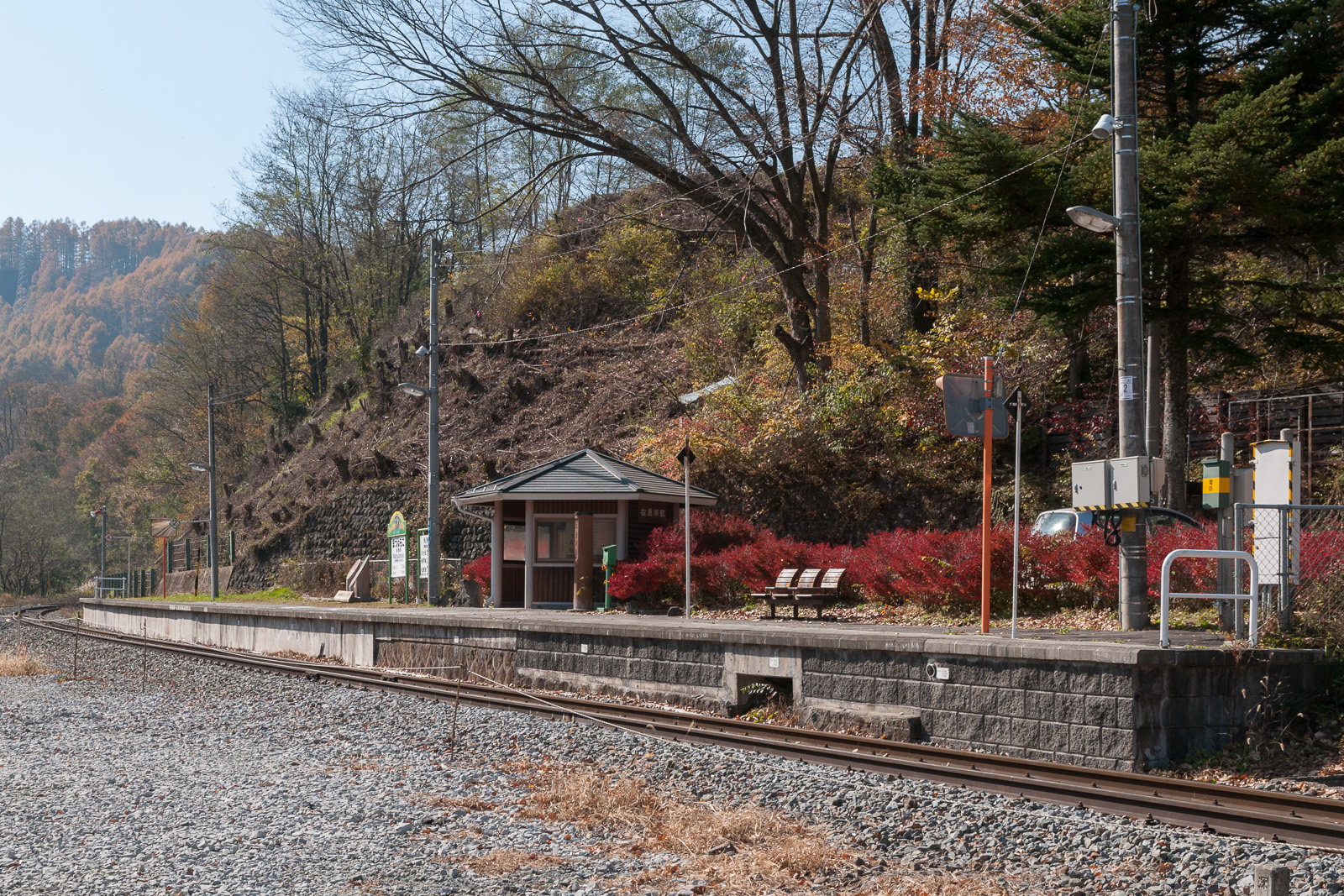
- Matsubarako Station, November 2012

General information
- Location: Toyosato, Koumi-machi, Minamisaku-gun, Nagano-ken 384-1103; Japan
- Coordinates: 36.0612°N 138.4705°E
- Elevation: 986 meters
- Operator: JR East
- Line: ■ Koumi Line
- Distance: 44.8 km from Kobuchizawa
- Platforms: 1 side platform

Other information
- Status: Unstaffed
- Website: Official website

History
- Opened: 27 December 1932

Passengers
- FY2011: 11

Services
Preceding station	JR East	Following station
Koumi towards Komoro	Koumi Line	Umijiri towards Kobuchizawa
Location
- Location within Nagano Prefecture Location within Japan

Matsubarako Station (松原湖駅, Matsubarako-eki) is a train station in Uminokuchi in the town of Koumi, Minamisaku District, Nagano Prefecture, Japan, operated by East Japan Railway Company (JR East).

== Lines ==
Matsubarako Station is served by the Koumi Line and is 44.8 kilometers from the terminus of the line at Kobuchizawa Station.

== Station layout ==
The station consists of one ground-level side platform serving a single bi-directional track. The station is unattended.

== History ==
Matsubarako Station opened on 27 December 1932. With the privatization of Japanese National Railways (JNR) on 1 April 1987, the station came under the control of JR East.

== Surrounding area ==
- Chikuma River
- National Route 141

== See also ==
- List of railway stations in Japan
