= Saku-Hirose Station =

Railway station in Minamimaki, Nagano Prefecture, Japan

Saku-Hirose Station 佐久広瀬駅
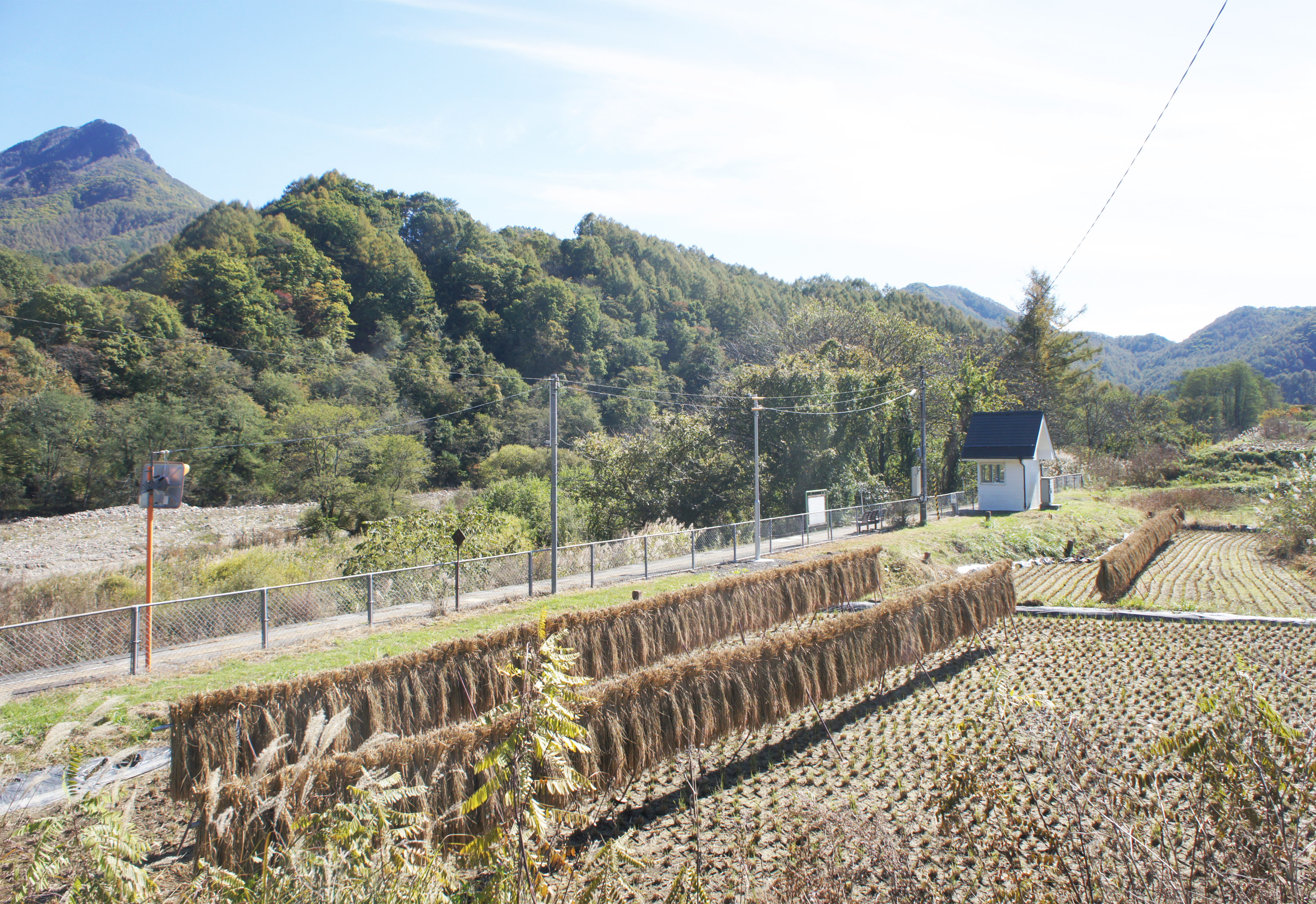
- Saku-Hirose Station, October 2021

General information
- Location: Hirose, Minamimaki-mura, Minamisaku-gun, Nagano-ken 384-1303; Japan
- Coordinates: 36.0037°N 138.5191°E
- Elevation: 1082 meters
- Operator: JR East
- Line: ■ Koumi Line
- Distance: 34.9 km from Kobuchizawa
- Platforms: 1 side platform

Other information
- Status: Unstaffed
- Website: Official website

History
- Opened: 16 January 1935

Services
Preceding station	JR East	Following station
Saku-Uminokuchi towards Komoro	Koumi Line	Shinano-Kawakami towards Kobuchizawa
Location
- Location within Nagano Prefecture Location within Japan

Saku-Hirose Station (佐久広瀬駅, Saku-Hirose-eki) is a train station in the village of Minamimaki, Minamisaku District, Nagano Prefecture, Japan, operated by East Japan Railway Company (JR East).

== Lines ==
Saku-Hirose Station is served by the Koumi Line and is 34.9 kilometers from the terminus of the line at Kobuchizawa Station.

== Station layout ==
The station consists of one ground-level side platform serving a single bi-directional track. There is no station building, but only a shelter directly on the platform. The station is unattended.

== History ==
Saku-Hirose Station opened on 16 January 1935. With the privatization of Japanese National Railways (JNR) on 1 April 1987, the station came under the control of JR East.

== Surrounding area ==
- Chikuma River

== See also ==
- List of railway stations in Japan
