= Nobeyama radio observatory =

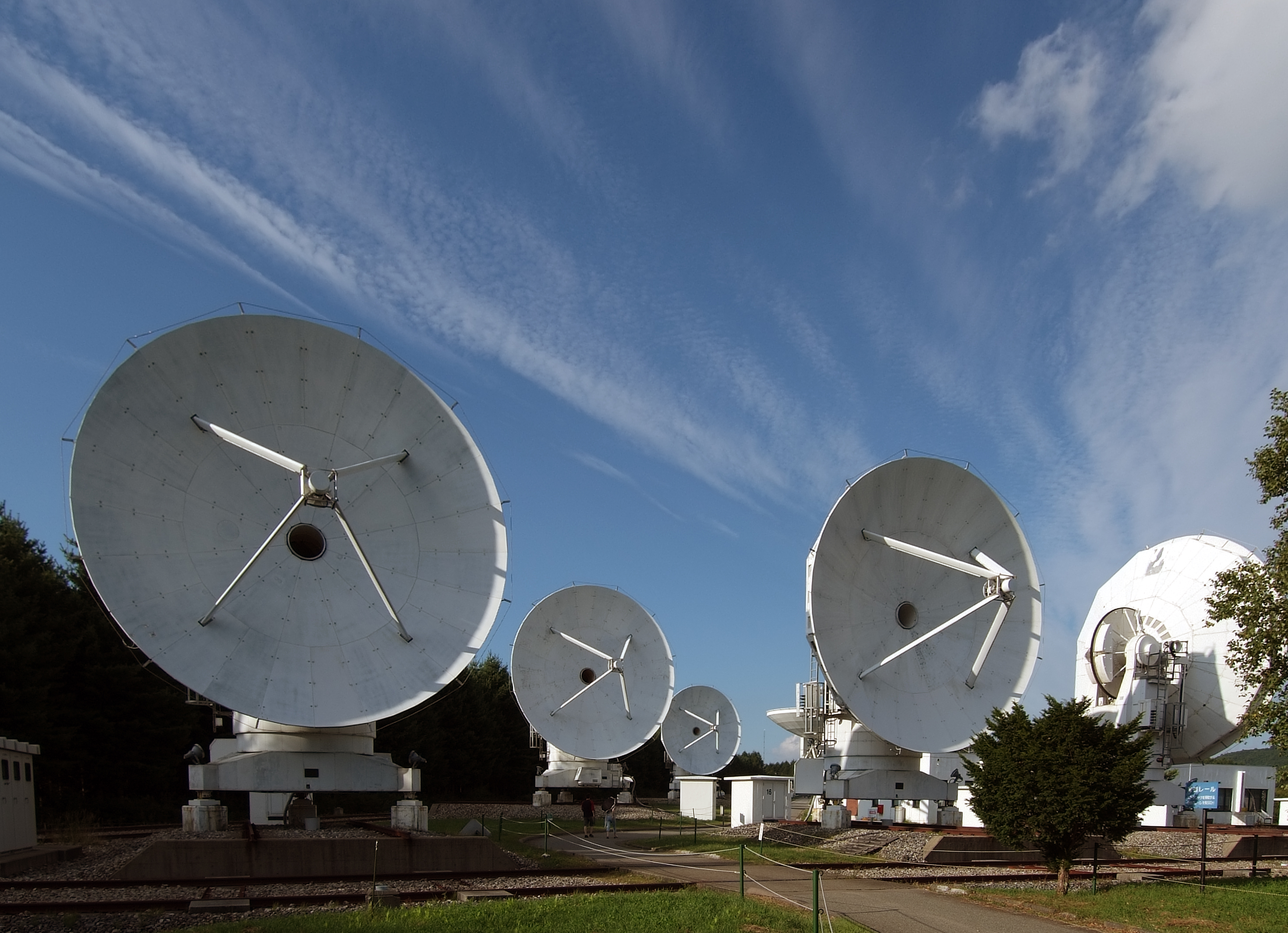
- Nobeyama radio observatory in 2009
- Organization: National Astronomical Observatory of Japan
- Location: Minamimaki, Minamisaku District, Nagano Prefecture, Japan
- Coordinates: 35°56′30″N 138°28′33″E
- Altitude: 1,350 m (4,430 ft)
- Website: www.nro.nao.ac.jp
- Telescopes: Nobeyama 45m Radio Telescope; Nobeyama Millimetre Array; Nobeyama Radio Polarimeters; Nobeyama Radioheliograph
- Related media on Commons

The Nobeyama Radio Observatory (NRO) is an astronomical observatory located near Minamimaki, Nagano, Japan at an elevation of 1350 metres. It is a division of the National Astronomical Observatory of Japan (NAOJ) and consists of four radio instruments.

- The 45-m Radio Telescope: A 45-m single-dish radio telescope that operates in short-millimetre wavelengths. Its receivers operate at 1, 2, 3.75, 9.4, 17, 35, and 80 GHz in both left and right polarizations.
- The Nobeyama Millimetre Array (NMA): A millimetre interferometer consisting of six 10-m diameter telescopes.
- The Nobeyama Radioheliograph (NoRH): An array of eighty-four, 80 cm antennas dedicated to solar observations. Their receivers operate at 17–34 GHz in both left and right polarizations.
- The Nobeyama Radio Polarimeters: A set of radio telescopes that continuously observes the full Sun at the frequencies of 1, 2, 3.75, 9.4, 17, 35, and 80 GHz, at left and right circular polarization.
