= Shinano-Kawakami Station =

Railway station in Kawakami, Nagano Prefecture, Japan

Shinano-Kawakami Station 信濃川上駅
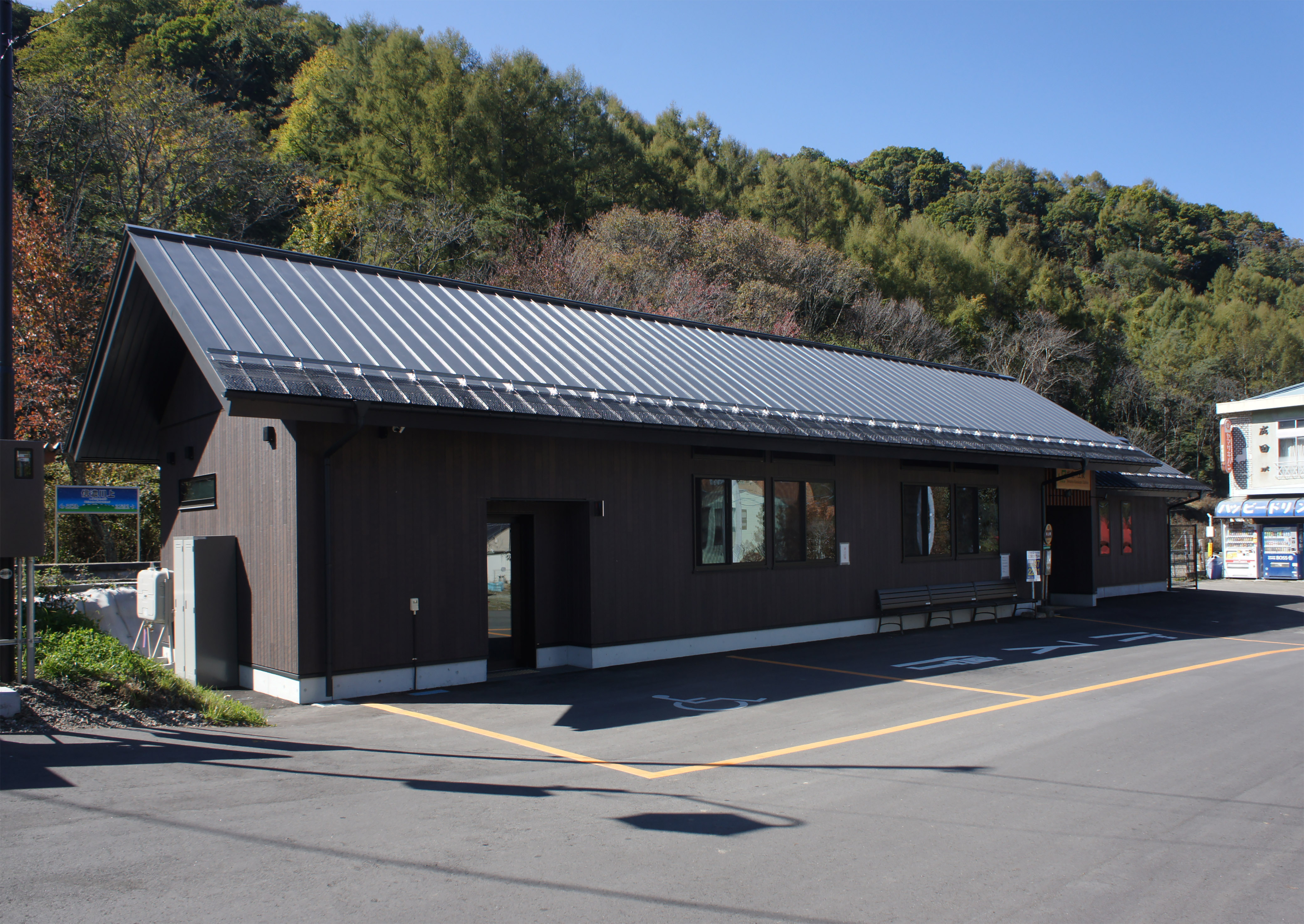
- Station structure, October 2021

General information
- Location: 999 Goshotaira, Kawakami Village, Minamisaku District, Nagano Prefecture 384-1407; Japan
- Coordinates: 35.9761°N 138.5276°E
- Elevation: 1,138 m (3,733 ft 7 in)
- Operator: JR East
- Line: Koumi Line
- Distance: 31.5 km (19.6 mi) from Kobuchizawa
- Platforms: 1 island platform
- Tracks: 2

Construction
- Structure type: At grade

Other information
- Status: Unstaffed
- Website: Official website

History
- Opened: 14 April 1935; 91 years ago

Passengers
- FY2021: 88

Services
Preceding station	JR East	Following station
Saku-Hirose towards Komoro	Koumi Line	Nobeyama towards Kobuchizawa
Location
- Location within Nagano Prefecture Location within Chubu region Location within Japan

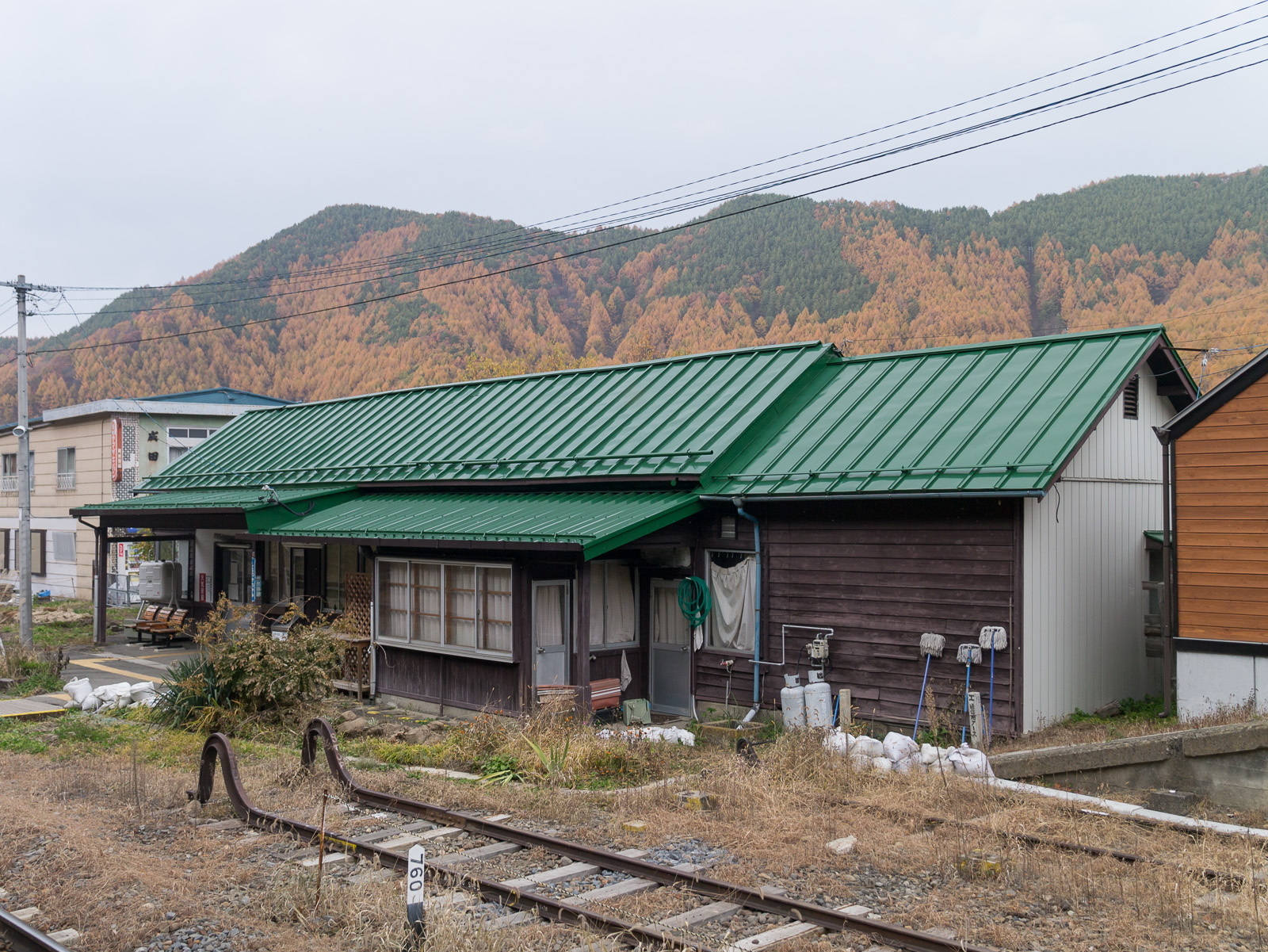
Station building, November 2007

Shinano-Kawakami Station (信濃川上駅, Shinano-Kawakami-eki) is a railway station in the village of Kawakami, Minamisaku District, Nagano Prefecture, Japan, operated by East Japan Railway Company (JR East).

== Lines ==
Shinano-Kawakami Station is served by the Koumi Line and is 31.5 kilometers from the terminus of the line at Kobuchizawa Station.

== Station layout ==
The station consists of one very narrow ground-level island platform serving two tracks, connected to the station building by a level crossing. The station is unattended.

=== Platforms ===
station side	■ Koumi Line	for Koumi and Komoro
opp side	■ Koumi Line	for Kiyosato and Kobuchizawa

== History ==
Shinano-Kawakami Station opened on 16 January 1935. With the privatization of Japanese National Railways (JNR) on 1 April 1987, the station came under the control of JR East. The current station building was completed in 2002.

== Passenger statistics ==
In fiscal 2015, the station was used by an average of 110 passengers daily (boarding passengers only).

== Gallery ==
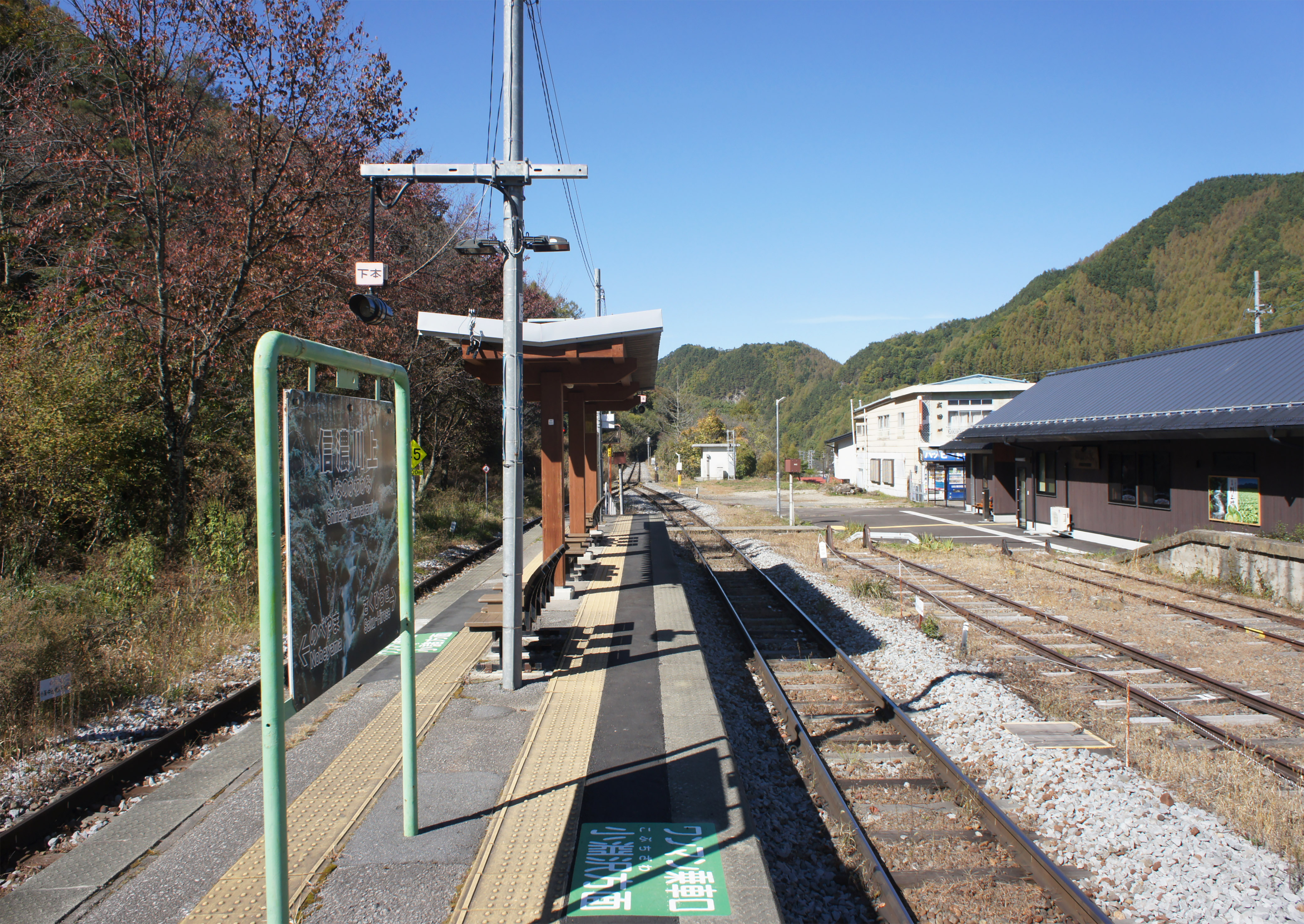
Platforms, October 2021

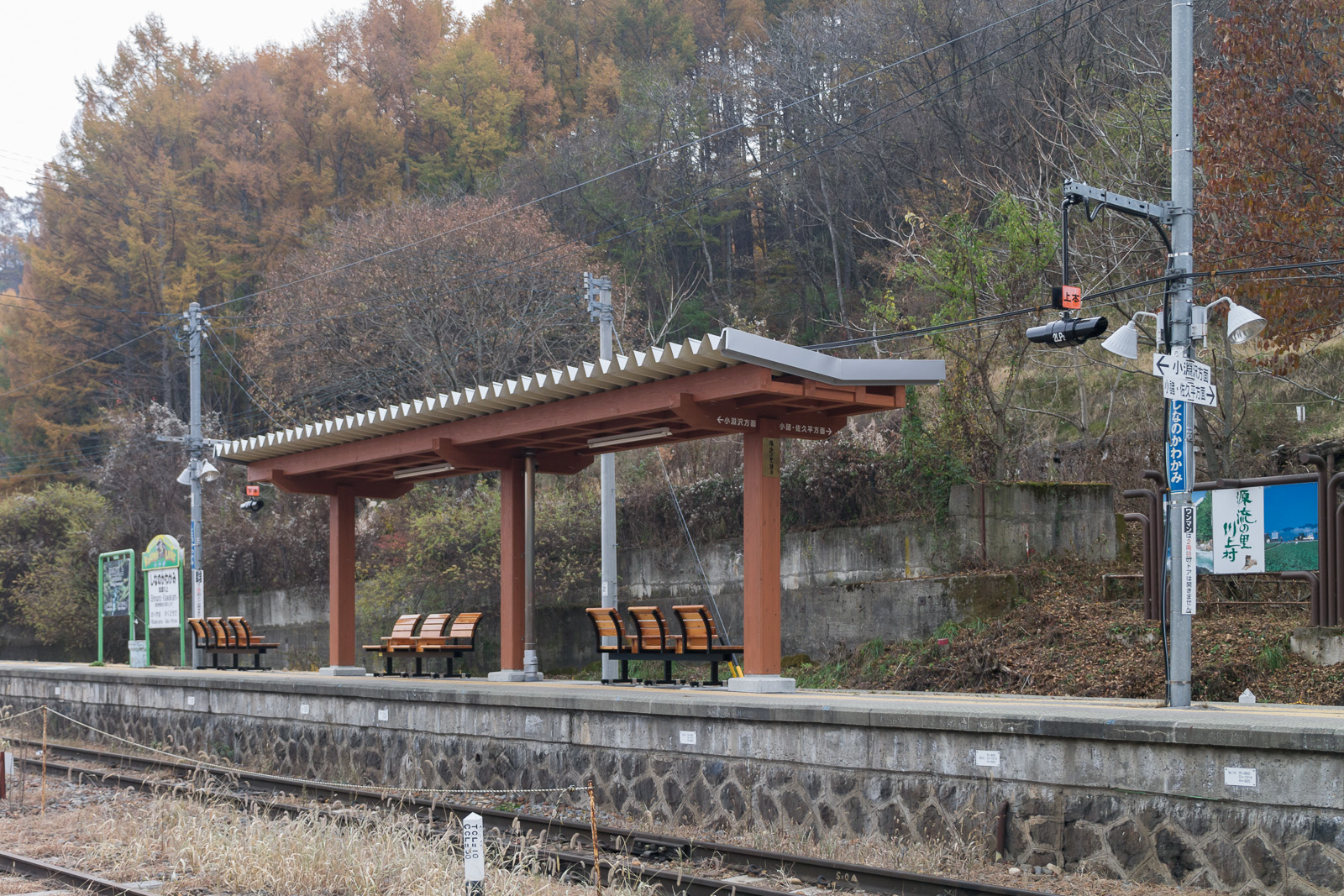
Platforms, October 2021

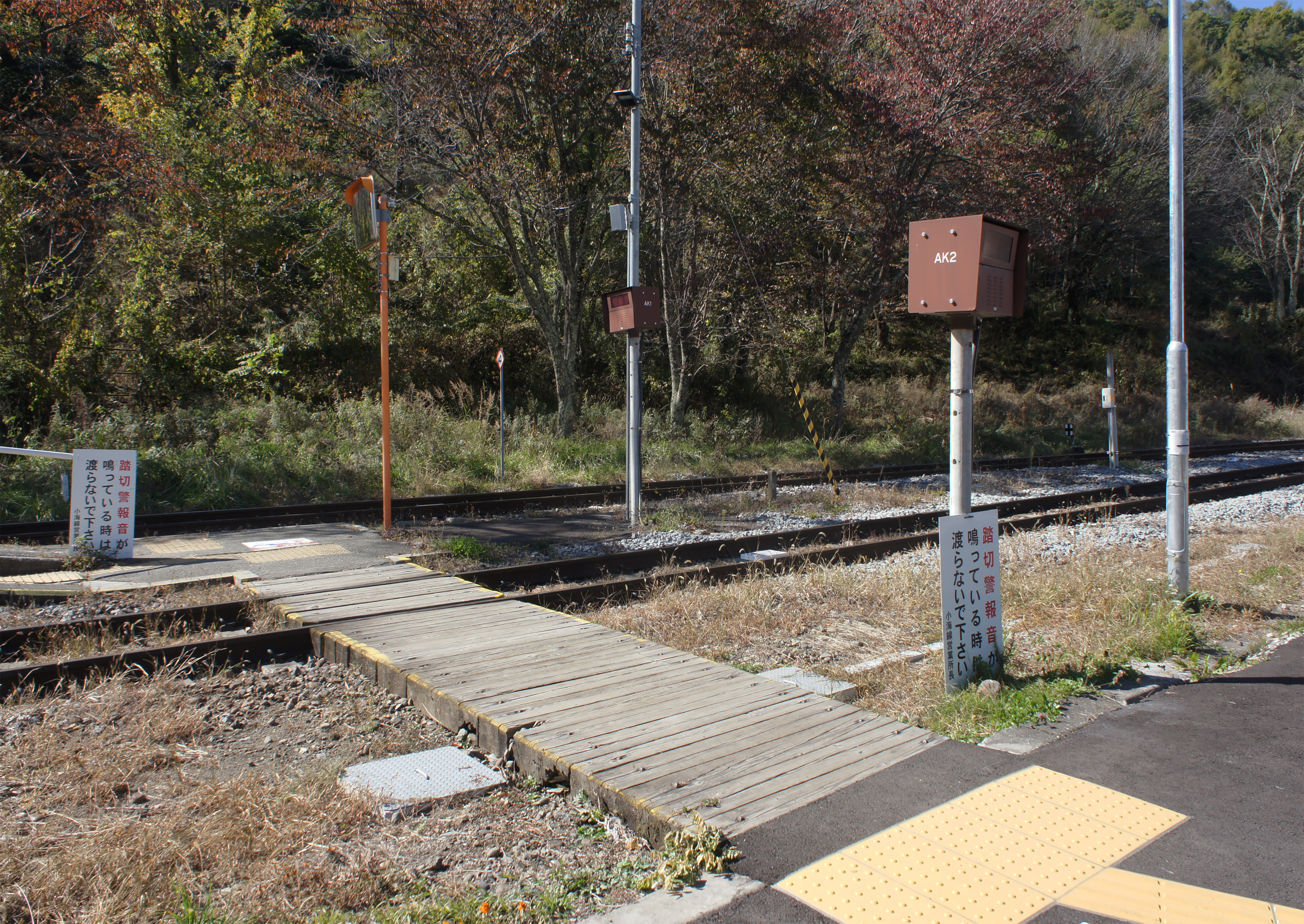
Pedestrian crossings, October 2021

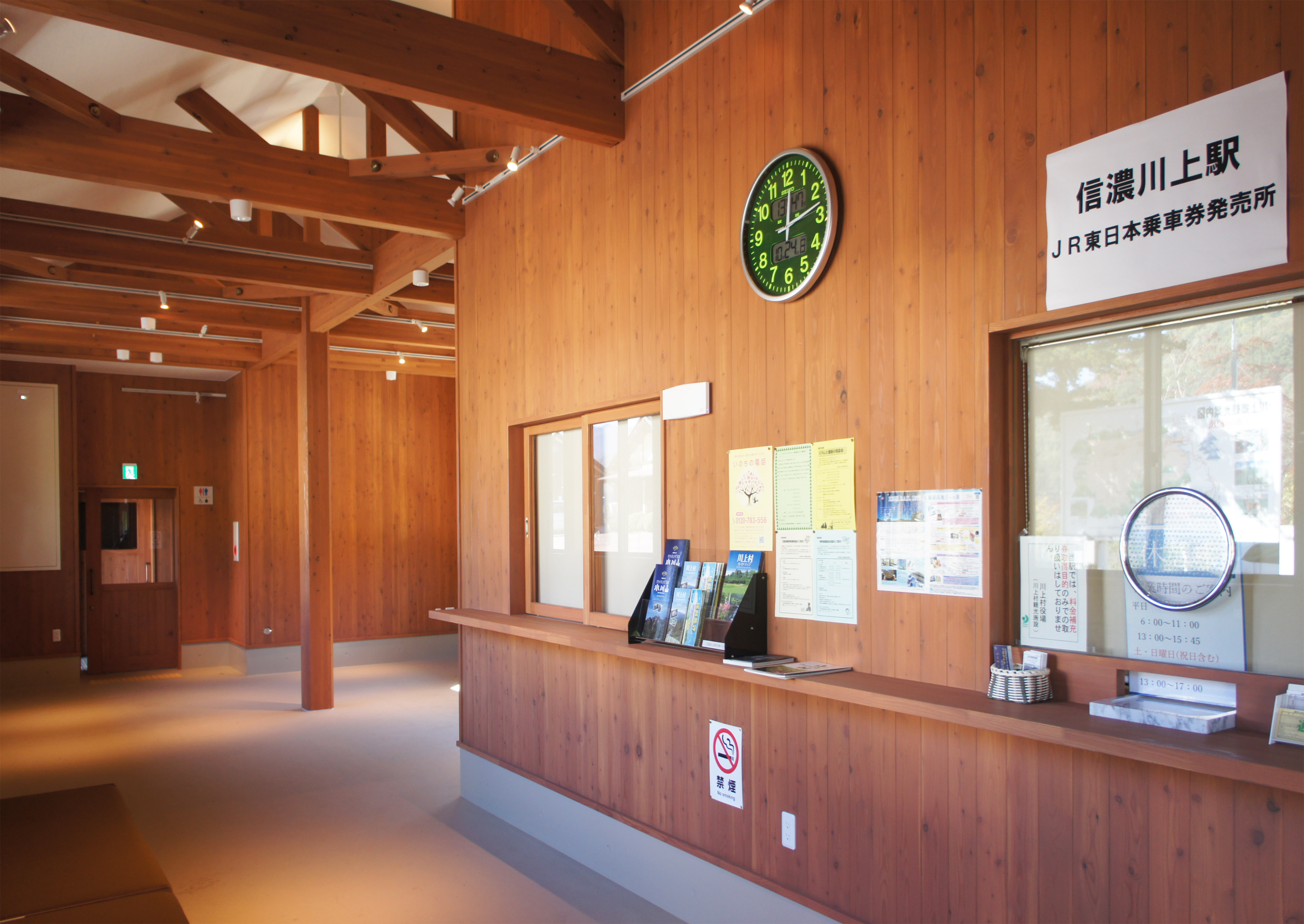
Concourse, October 2021

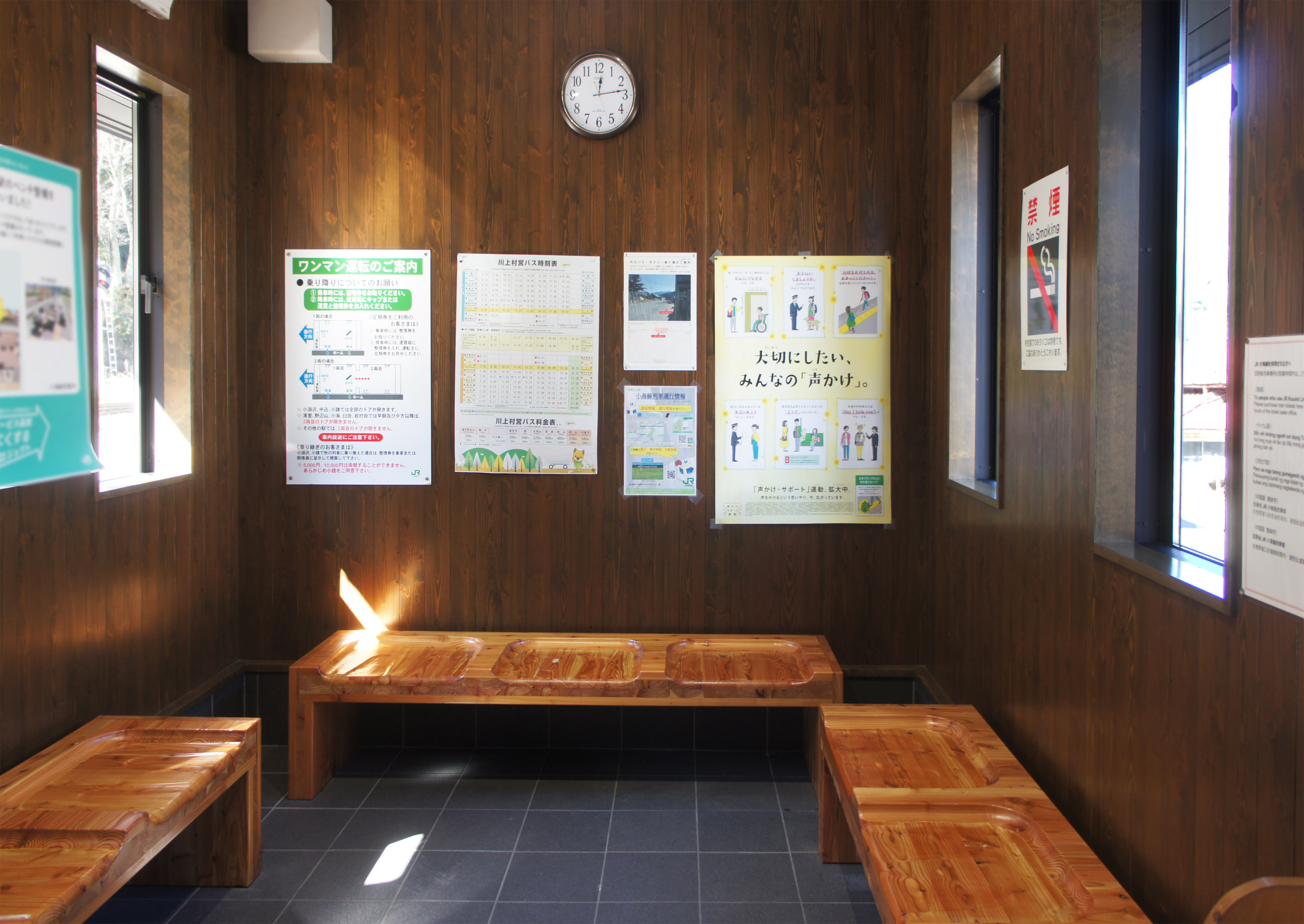
Waiting room, October 2021

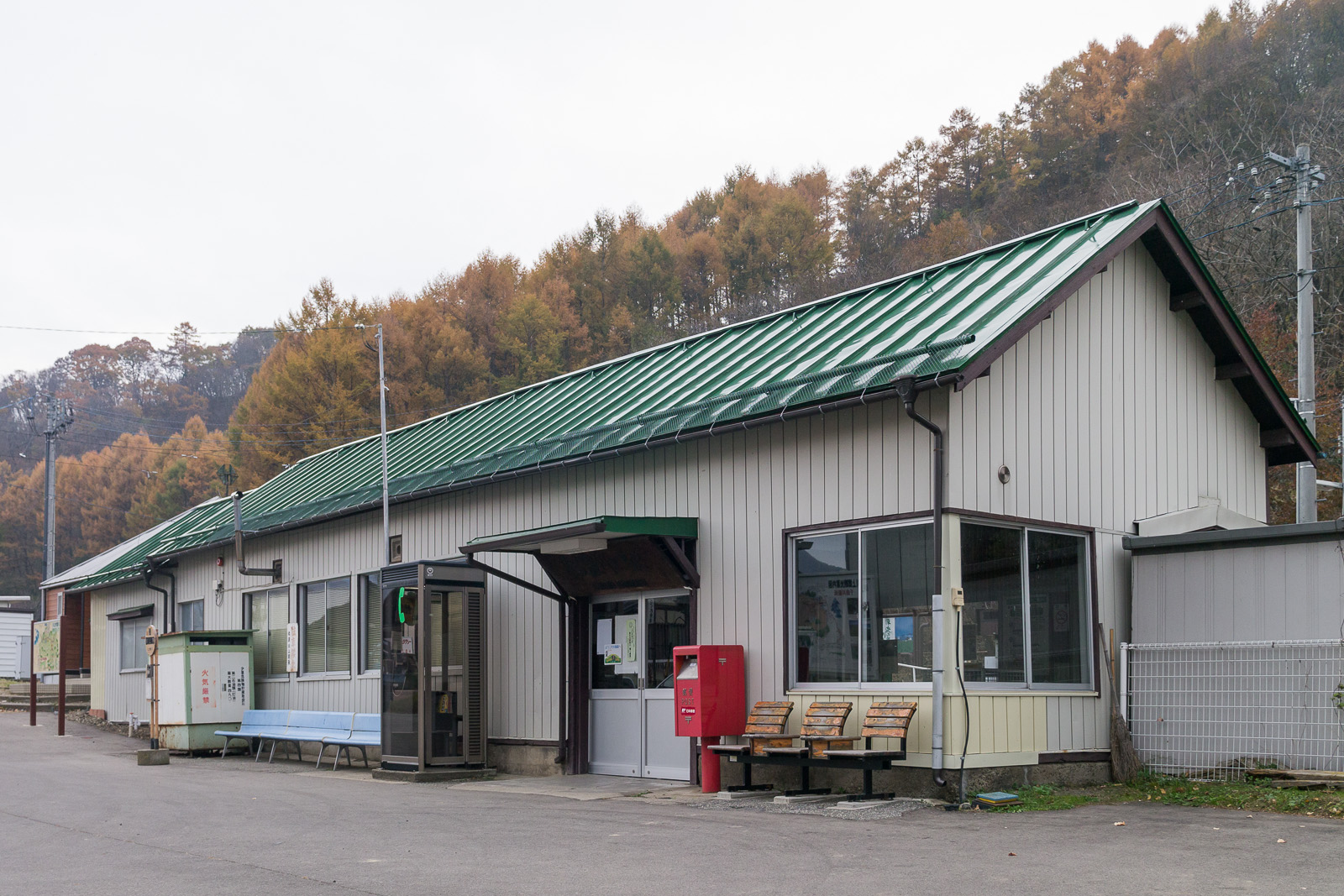
Station structure, April 2010

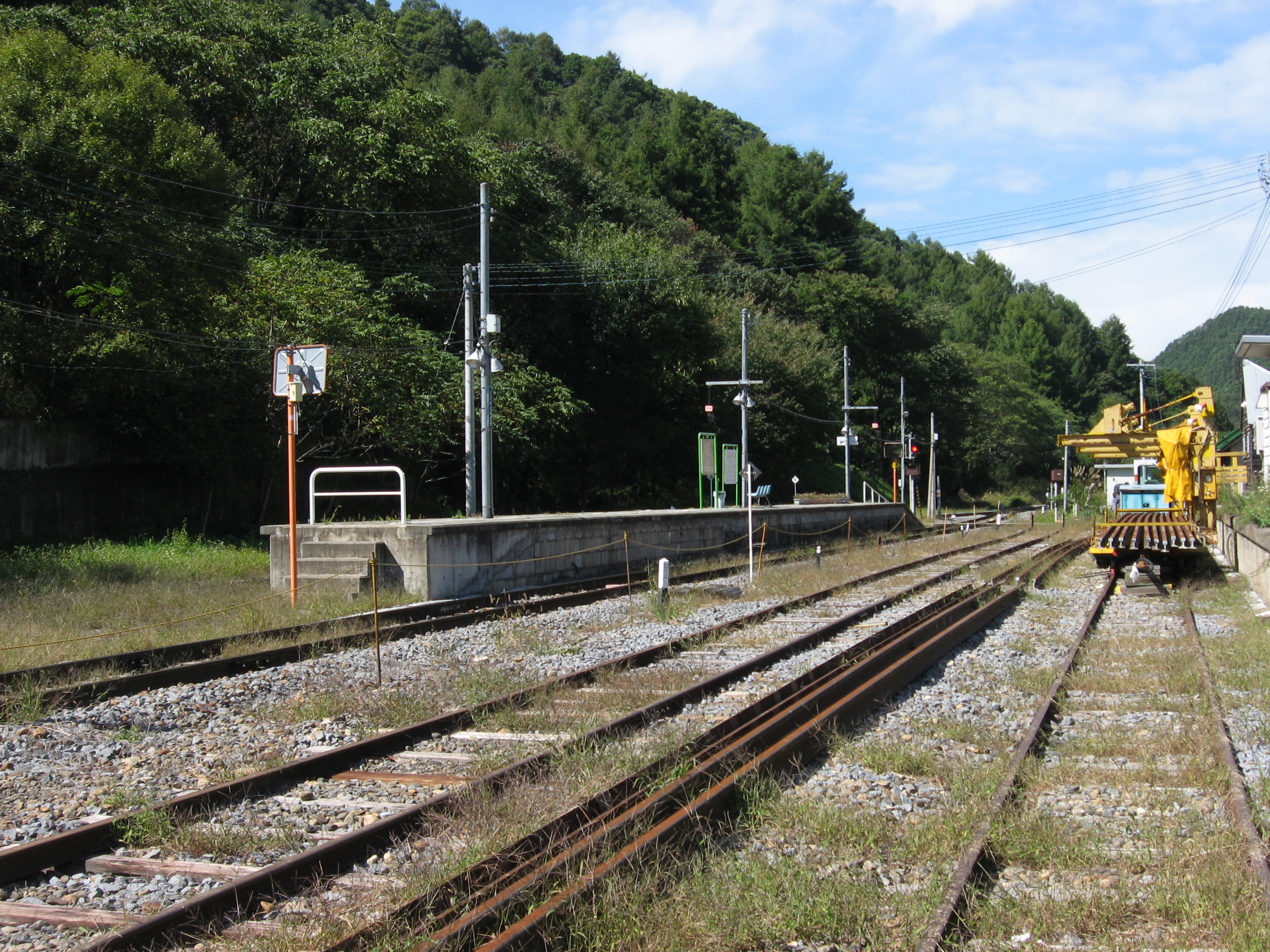
Shinano-Kawakami Station, October 2007

== Surrounding area ==
- Chikuma River

== See also ==
- List of railway stations in Japan
