= Chiisagata District, Nagano =

District in Nagano Prefecture, Japan

Coordinates: 36.313762°N 138.082867°E

Chiisagata (小県郡, Chiisagata-gun) is a district located in Nagano Prefecture, Japan.

As of February 1, 2006, the district has an estimated population of 12,039 with a density of 49.94 persons per km^{2}. The total area is now down to 241.04 km^{2}.

== Municipalities ==
The district consists of one town and one village:

- Aoki (Note: Classified as a village.)
- Nagawa (Note: Classified as a town.)

== History ==
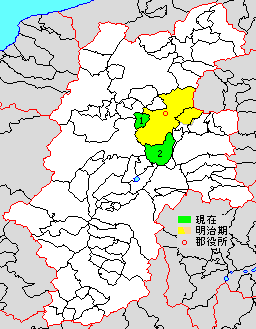
Map showing original extent of Chiisagata District in Nagano Prefecture: * yellow - areas formerly within the district borders during the early Meiji period: 1. Aoki-mura; 2. Nagawa-machi

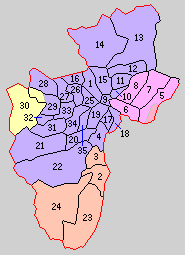
Colored areas are in this district.

=== District Timeline ===
- January 14, 1879 - Due to the district, ward, town and village status enforcement, the district seat was located at the town of Ueda.
- April 1, 1889 - Due to enforcing the town and village status, Chiisagata District formed the towns of Ueda, Nagakuboshin, and Nagakubofuru, and 32 villages (3 towns, 32 villages)
- October 30, 1912 - The village of Maruko gained town status. (4 towns, 31 villages)
- May 1, 1919 - The town of Ueda gained city status which lasted until March 6, 2006. (3 towns, 31 villages)
- September 10, 1921 - (-) The village of Sakashita merged into the city of Ueda. (3 towns, 30 villages)
- September 1, 1949 - The villages of Higashishiota and Fujisan merged to form the village of Higashishiota. (3 towns, 29 villages)
- October 1, 1953 - The village of Sagata gained town status and changed the name to Tanaka. (4 towns, 28 villages)
- April 1, 1954 - (-) The villages of Shiojiri and Kawabe merged into the city of Ueda (4 towns, 26 villages)
- October 1, 1954 - The villages of Higashiuchi and Nishiuchi merged into the town of Maruko (4 towns, 24 villages)
- April 1, 1955 - The villages of Yoda and Nagase merged into the town of Maruko. (4 towns, 22 villages)
- May 1, 1956 - The villages of Nishishiota, Bessho, Higashishiota, and Nakashiota merged to form the town of Shiota. (5 towns, 18 villages)
- September 30, 1956 (4 towns, 11 villages)
  - The town of Tanaka and the villages Netsu and Wa merged to form the town of Tōbu.
  - The village of Toyosato and Tonoshiro merged to form the village of Toyotono.
  - The towns of Nakakuboshin and Nakakubofuru and the village of Daimon merged to form the town of Nagato.
  - (-) The villages of Kamigawa and Izumida merged into the city of Ueda.
  - The village of Shiokawa merged into the town of Maruko
- March 31, 1957 (4 towns, 10 villages)
  - Parts of the village of Urazato merged into the village of Aoki.
- *The village of Muroga and the remaining parts of the village of Urazaro merged to form the village of Kawanishi.
- August 1, 1957 - (-) The village of Kamishina merged into the city of Ueda (4 towns, 9 villages)
- April 1, 1958 - (-) The village of Toyotono merged into the city of Ueda (4 towns, 8 villages)
- April 10, 1958 - The village of Shino merged into the town of Tōbu. (4 towns, 7 villages)
- October 1, 1958 - The villages of Naga, Hoyo, and Motohara merged to form the town of Sanada. (5 towns, 4 villages)
- April 1, 1959 - (-) Parts of the town of Tōbu was merged into the city of Komoro.
- April 1, 1970 - (-) The town of Shiota was merged into the city of Ueda.(4 towns, 4 villages)
- April 1, 1973 - (-) The village of Kawanishi was merged into the city of Ueda.(4 towns, 3 villages)

=== Recent mergers ===
- April 1, 2004 - (-) The town of Tōbu was merged with the village of Kitamimaki (from Kitasaku District) to form the new city of Tōmi. (3 towns, 3 villages)
- October 1, 2005 - The town of Nagato and the village of Wada were merged to form the new town of Nagawa. (3 towns, 2 villages)
- March 6, 2006 - (-) The towns of Maruko and Sanada, and the village of Takeshi were merged with the former city of Ueda to form the new city of Ueda. (1 town, 1 village)

=== Notes ===
- (+) - The district gained land.
- (-) - The district lost land.
