= Tomi Tobu Junior High School =

Location
- 2-300 Tokida Tomi Nagano; Tomi, Nagano; Japan
- Coordinates: 36°21′31.44″N 138°20′33.47″E

Information
- Type: Public
- Established: March 1, 1961, 65 years ago
- Grades: 7-9
- Elevation: 565m
- Website: Official Website

Tōmi Tobu Junior High School (東御市立東部中学校, Tōmi-shiritsu Tōbu Tyūgakkou) is a public junior high school in Tomi, Nagano, Japan.

== History ==
The school opened 65 years ago in 1961, as a municipal junior high school, whose name was 東部町立東部中学校 (Tōbu tyōritsu tōbu tyūgakkou).
