= Nakasato Station (Nagano) =

Railway station in Saku, Nagano Prefecture, Japan

Nakasato Station 中佐都駅
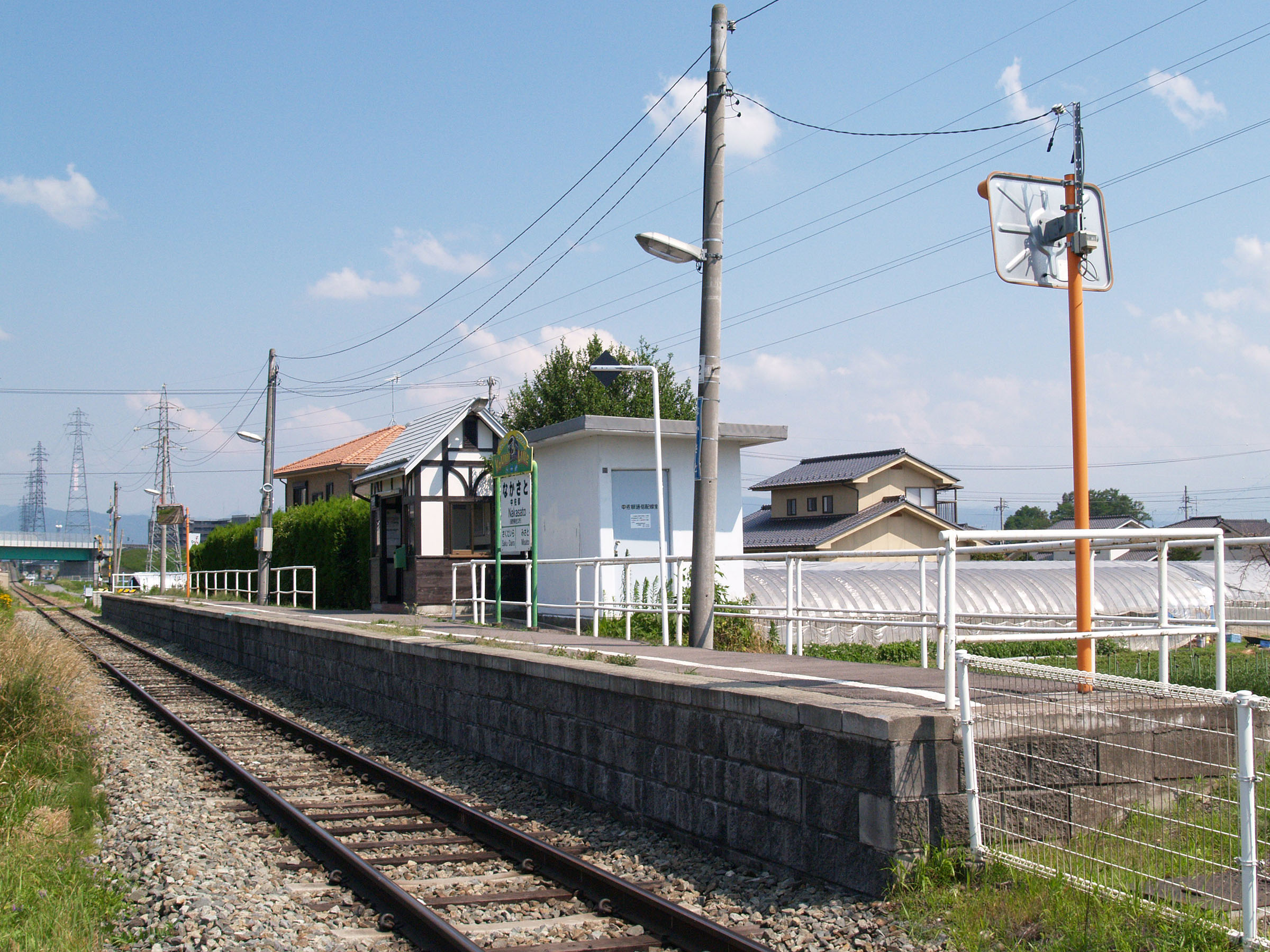
- Nakasato Station, July 2011

General information
- Location: 1926 Nagatoro, Saku-shi, Nagano-ken 385-0021; Japan
- Coordinates: 36.2808°N 138.4533°E
- Elevation: 699.3 meters
- Operator: JR East
- Line: ■ Koumi Line
- Distance: 72.4 km from Kobuchizawa
- Platforms: 1 side platform

Other information
- Status: Unstaffed
- Website: Official website

History
- Opened: 8 December 1915

Passengers
- FY2011: 57

Services
Preceding station	JR East	Following station
Misato towards Komoro	Koumi Line	Sakudaira towards Kobuchizawa
Location
- Location within Nagano Prefecture Location within Japan

Nakasato Station (中佐都駅, Nakasato-eki) is a railway station in the city of Saku, Nagano, Japan, operated by East Japan Railway Company (JR East).

== Lines ==
Nakasato Station is served by the Koumi Line and is 72.4 kilometers from the terminus of the line at Kobuchizawa Station.

== Station layout ==
The station consists of one ground-level side platform. The station is unattended.

== History ==
Nakasato Station opened on 8 August 1915. With the dissolution and privatization of JNR on April 1, 1987, the station came under the control of the East Japan Railway Company (JR East).

== Surrounding area ==
- National Route 141

== See also ==
- List of railway stations in Japan
