= Wada, Nagano =

Dissolved municipality in Nagano prefecture, Japan

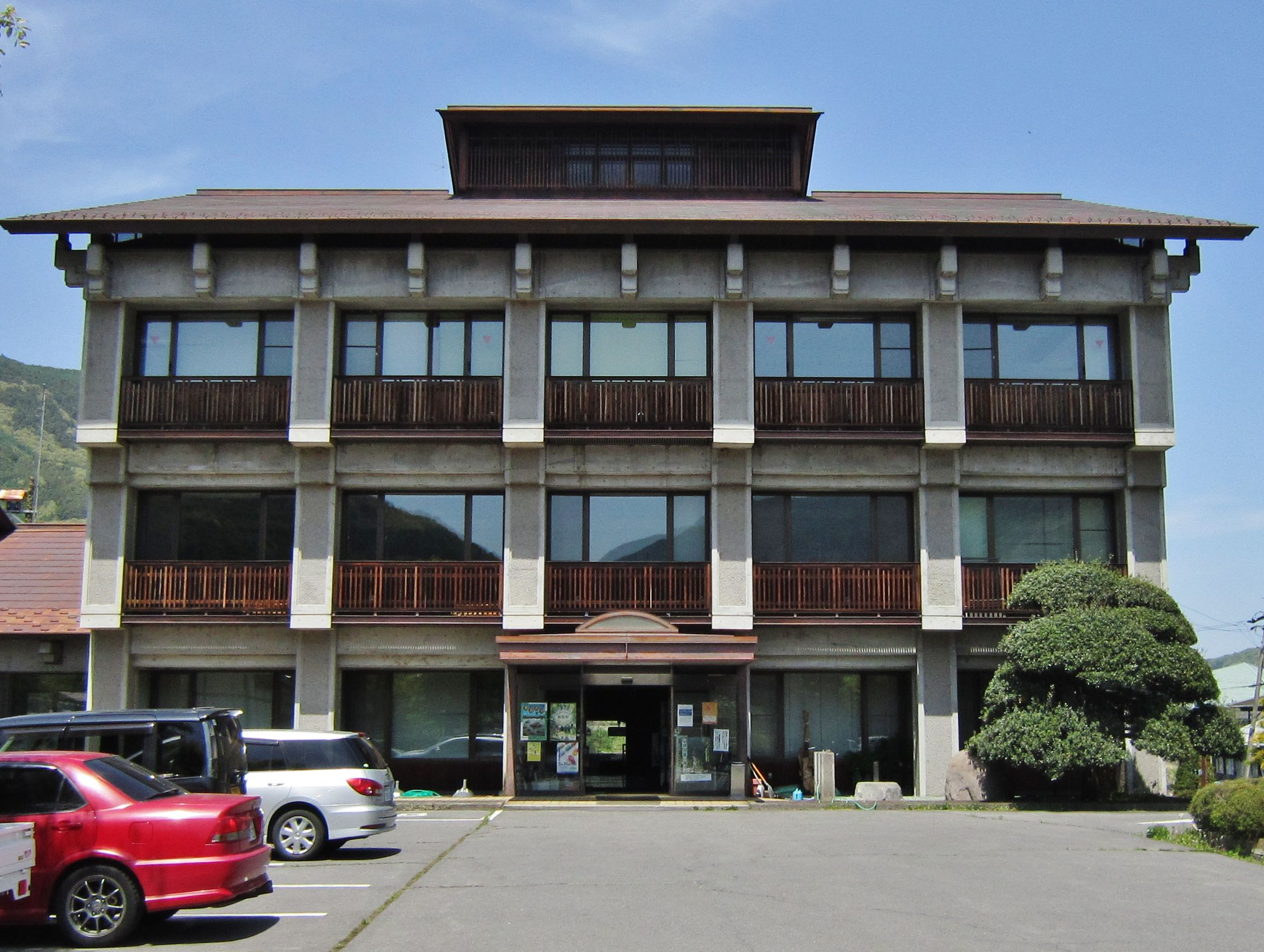
former Wada village hall

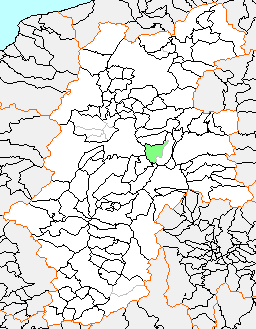
Map of Wada, Nagano

Wada (和田村, Wada-mura) was a village located in Chiisagata District, Nagano Prefecture, Japan.

As of 2003, the village had an estimated population of 2,505 and a density of 28.53 persons per km^{2}. The total area was 87.81 km^{2}.

On October 1, 2005, Wada, along with the town of Nagato (also from Chiisagata District), was merged to create the town of Nagawa.
