= Misato Station (Nagano) =

Railway station in Komoro, Nagano Prefecture, Japan

Misato Station 美里駅
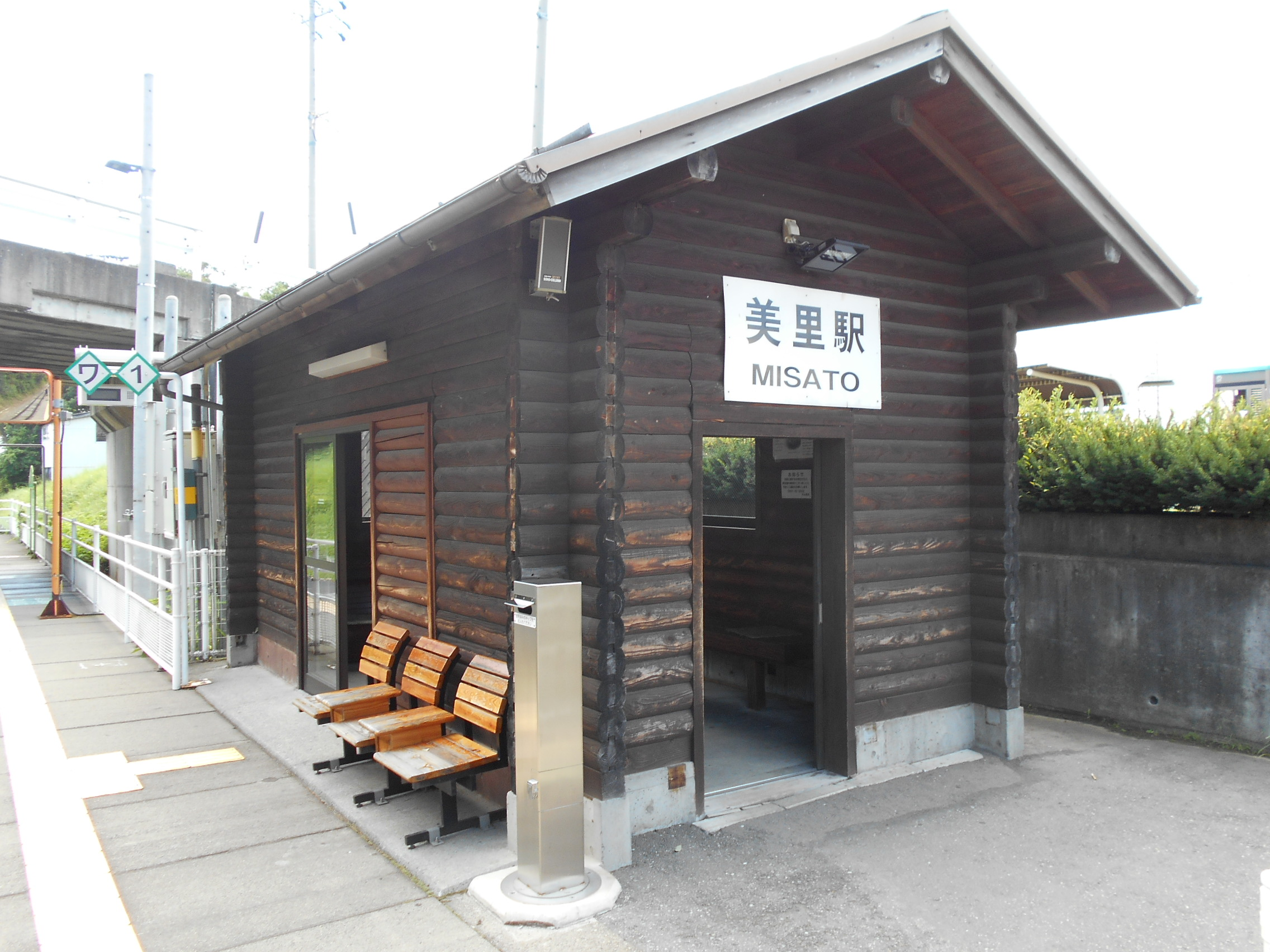
- Misato Station, August 2017

General information
- Location: 955 Ichi, Komoro-shi, Nagano-ken 384-0083; Japan
- Coordinates: 36.2920°N 138.4500°E
- Elevation: 703.4 meters
- Operator: JR East
- Line: ■ Koumi Line
- Distance: 73.8 km from Kobuchizawa
- Platforms: 1 side platform

Other information
- Status: Unstaffed
- Website: Official website

History
- Opened: 1 December 1988

Passengers
- FY2011: 152

Services
Preceding station	JR East	Following station
Mitsuoka towards Komoro	Koumi Line	Nakasato towards Kobuchizawa
Location
- Location within Nagano Prefecture Location within Japan

Misato Station (美里駅, Misato-eki) is a train station in the city of Komoro, Nagano, Japan, operated by East Japan Railway Company (JR East).

== Lines ==
Misato Station is served by the Koumi Line and is 73.8 kilometers from the terminus of the line at Kobuchizawa Station.

== Station layout ==
The station consists of one ground-level side platform serving a single bi-directional track. The station is unattended.

== History ==
Misato Station opened on 1 December 1988.

== Surrounding area ==
- National Route 141

== See also ==
- List of railway stations in Japan
