= Komoro, Nagano =

Komoro 小諸市
- City
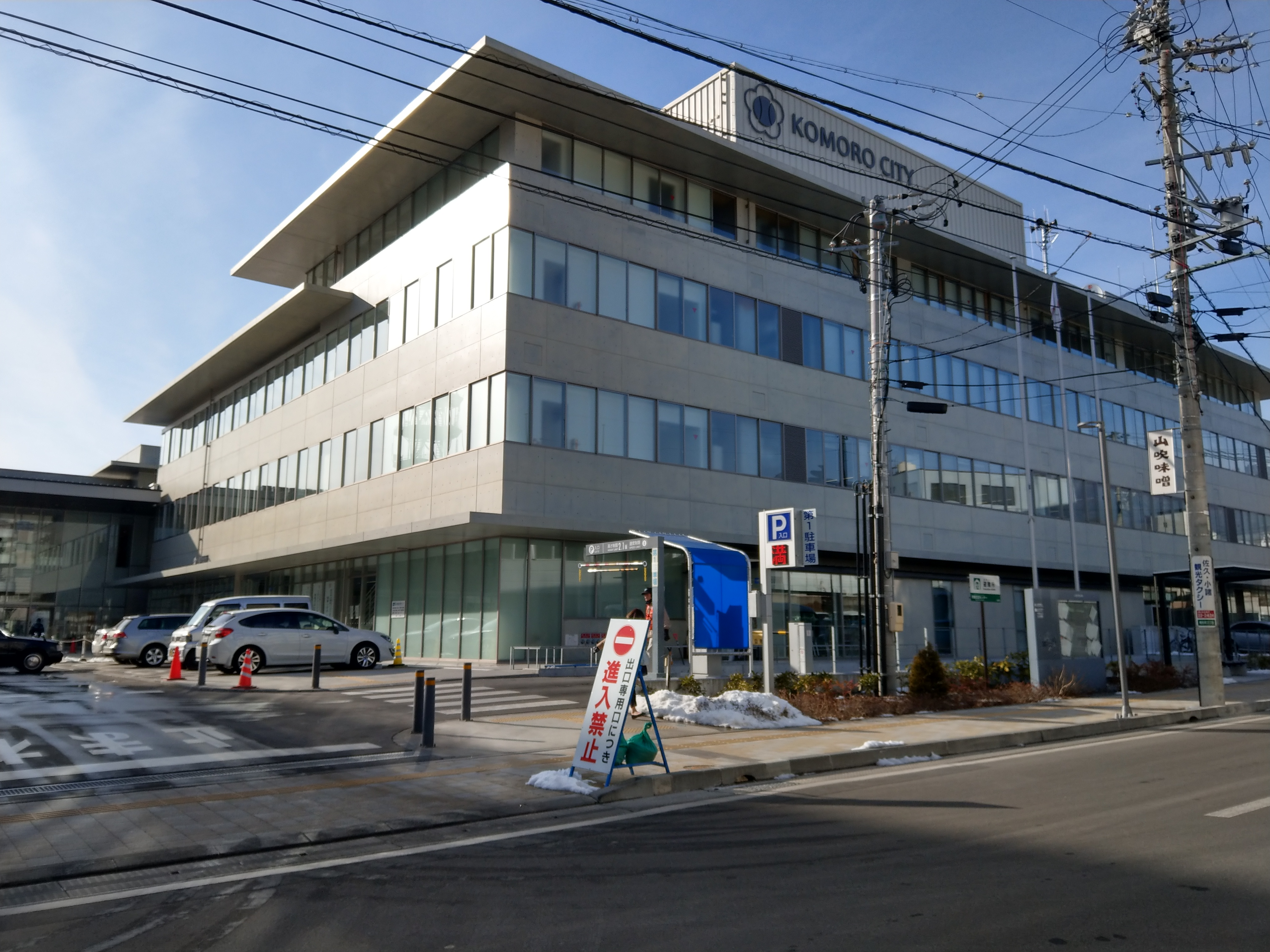
- Komoro City Hall

- Flag Emblem

- Location of Komoro in Nagano Prefecture

- Coordinates: 36°19′39.0″N 138°25′33.0″E
- Country: Japan
- Region: Chūbu (Kōshin'etsu)
- Prefecture: Nagano

Area
  - Total: 98.55 km^{2} (38.05 sq mi)

Population (March 2019)
  - Total: 42,489
  - Density: 431.1/km^{2} (1,117/sq mi)
- Time zone: UTC+9 (Japan Standard Time)
- Symbols
  - Tree: Prunus mume
  - Flower: Viola mandshurica f.plena
- Phone number: 0267-22-1700
- Address: 3-3-3 Aioi-chō, Komoro-shi, Nagano-ken 384-8501
- Website: Official website

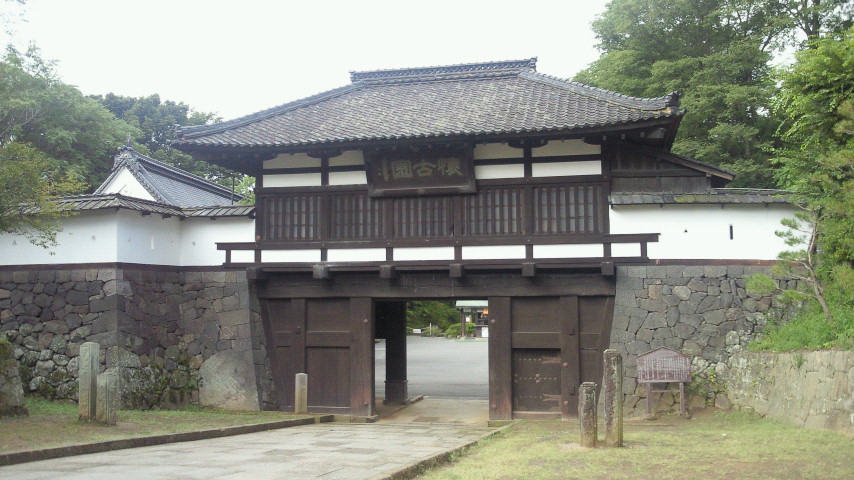
Gate of Komoro Castle

Komoro (小諸市, Komoro-shi) is a city located in Nagano Prefecture, Japan. As of 1 March 2019, the city had an estimated population of 42,489 in 18776 households, and a population density of 430 persons per km^{2}. Its total area is 98.55 square kilometres (38.05 sq mi).

== Geography ==
Komoro is located in eastern Nagano Prefecture. The Chikuma River flows through the southern and western part of the city. Some extinct volcanic mountains are located between Komoro and neighboring Tsumagoi. The highest point in Komoro is Mt. Kurofu (ja). Its peak is 2,404 metres (7,887 ft) above sea level. The lowest point is 540 metres (1,770 ft). The old city center is at about 700 metres (2,300 ft). There are many slopes, so Komoro is known as a "hilly city" (坂の町).

=== Surrounding municipalities ===
- Gunma Prefecture
  - Tsumagoi
- Nagano Prefecture
  - Miyota
  - Saku
  - Tōmi

=== Climate ===
Komoro is far from the sea and surrounded by mountains, so the rainfall is lower and diurnal temperature range is greater than many locations in Japan, and average annual temperature of Komoro is relatively cool because of the high altitude. The city has a climate characterized by hot and humid summers, and relatively mild winters (Köppen climate classification Cfa). The average annual temperature in Komoro is 10.8 °C. The average annual rainfall is 1108 mm with September as the wettest month. The temperatures are highest on average in August, at around 23.9 °C, and lowest in January, at around -1.7 °C.

== Demographics ==
Per Japanese census data, the population of Komoro peaked at around the year 2000 and has declined slightly since.

Historical population
Year	Pop.	±%
1940	29,706	—
1950	37,701	+26.9%
1960	39,283	+4.2%
1970	39,093	−0.5%
1980	42,355	+8.3%
1990	44,888	+6.0%
2000	46,158	+2.8%
2010	44,012	−4.6%
2020	40,991	−6.9%

== History ==
=== Pre-modern ===
The area of present-day Komoro was part of ancient Shinano Province. The Tōsandō, one of the national routes passed Komoro, which was the location of an Umaya (駅), or post station for government officials and army. However, the name "Komoro" first appears in written history in the Kamakura period chronicle, Azuma Kagami. In those days, Komoro Tarō Mitsukane (小諸太郎光兼), a gokenin, was assigned by the shogunate to govern the area. During the Muromachi period, the region came under the control of the Ogasawara Ōi clan. The area had a very unsettled history during the Sengoku period. Under the Edo period Tokugawa shogunate, much of the area was under the control of Komoro Domain and the town developed into a jōkamachi around Komoro Castle.

=== Meiji period and later ===
The modern town of Komoro was established on April 1, 1889 with the establishment of the Meiji period municipalities system. The town of Komoro annexed villages of Kawabe, Kitaoi and Osato (all from Kitasaku District) on February 1, 1954. The city of Komoro was established on April 1, 1954 after absorbing the villages of Minamioi and Mitsuoka (both from Kitasaku District). On April 1, 1959, parts of the town of Tōbu (now part of the city of Tōmi) was merged into Komoro and the city has been unchanged since.

== Government ==
Komoro has a mayor-council form of government with a directly elected mayor and a unicameral city legislature of 19 members.

=== Economy ===
Komoro is a regional commercial center and has a primarily agricultural economy based on cultivation of rice, vegetables and fruits. Among agricultural products in Komoro, potatoes, soba, apples, and peaches are popular. Komoro has many soba restaurants and apple orchards, so a lot of visitors come there from Shutoken. Komoro is also known for its miso.

== Education ==
Komoro has six public elementary schools and two public middle schools operated by the city government. There are two public high schools operated by the Nagano Prefectural Board of Education.

== Transportation ==
=== Railway ===
- East Japan Railway Company - Koumi Line
  - Misato - Mitsuoka - Otome - Higashi-Komoro - Komoro
- Shinano Railway – Shinano Railway Line
  - Hirahara - Komoro
- Nunobiki Electric Railway (ja) (abolished in 1936)
  - Nunobiki - Oshidashi - Hanakawa - Komoro

=== Highway ===
- Jōshin-etsu Expressway
- Chūbu-Ōdan Expressway
- National Route 18
- National Route 141
- National Route 142
- National Route 403

== Sister city relations ==
Komoro is twinned with:

- Nakatsugawa, Gifu, Japan (1973)
- Ōiso, Kanagawa, Japan (1973)
- Namerikawa, Toyama, Japan (1974)

== Local attractions ==
- Kaikoen, a park in the center of Komoro containing the foundations of Komoro Castle as well as a museum dedicated to Shimazaki Toson (see below) and a zoo (ja). The third gate of castle (San'nomon) and the fourth gate (Otemon) are Important Cultural Properties of Japan, as is the Kyu Komoro Honjin (ja). Kaikoen is known for cherry blossoms, and has been selected as one of the Top 100 Cherry Blossom Viewing Sites in Japan (ja).
- Nunobikisan Shakuson-ji (Nunobiki-Kan'non) (ja), a Buddhist temple dating from 748 AD (Nara period) located at the top of a deep ravine. Kan'nondo Kūden, the oldest surviving building was built in 1252 and is an Important Cultural Property. You can also see Shidare zakura (ja) in April.
- Mountain hiking in Takamine (ja), close to the active volcano Mt Asama, and Mt. Kurofu is about a 30-minute drive uphill from Komoro. You can also enjoy skiing in winter, and onsen in all seasons there.
- Teranouchi Stone Age Settlement ruins, a Jōmon-period settlement trace and National Historic Site

== Notable residents ==
- Shuichi Abe, the current governor of Nagano prefecture. He and his family have been living in Komoro since 2014.
- Kuniaki Kobayashi, Japanese professional wrestler for AJPW and NJPW. He was born and raised in Komoro, Nagano.
- Tōson Shimazaki, poet and writer. Toson spent a period teaching in Komoro, and is featured in a dedicated museum located within Komoro's Kaikoen park.
- Sodo Yokoyama, a leaf-flute Zen Master who lived as a hermit in Komoro's Kaikoen Park until 1980. Yokoyama was inspired by an earlier resident of Komoro, the poet and writer Shimazaki Toson. See Arthur Braverman's excellent article for some personal recollections of Yokoyama.
