= Nagato, Nagano =

Dissolved municipality in Nagano prefecture, Japan

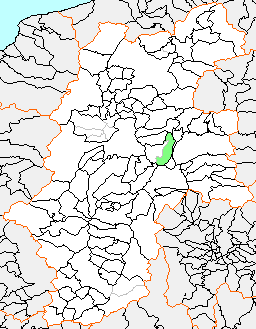
Map of Nagato, Nagano

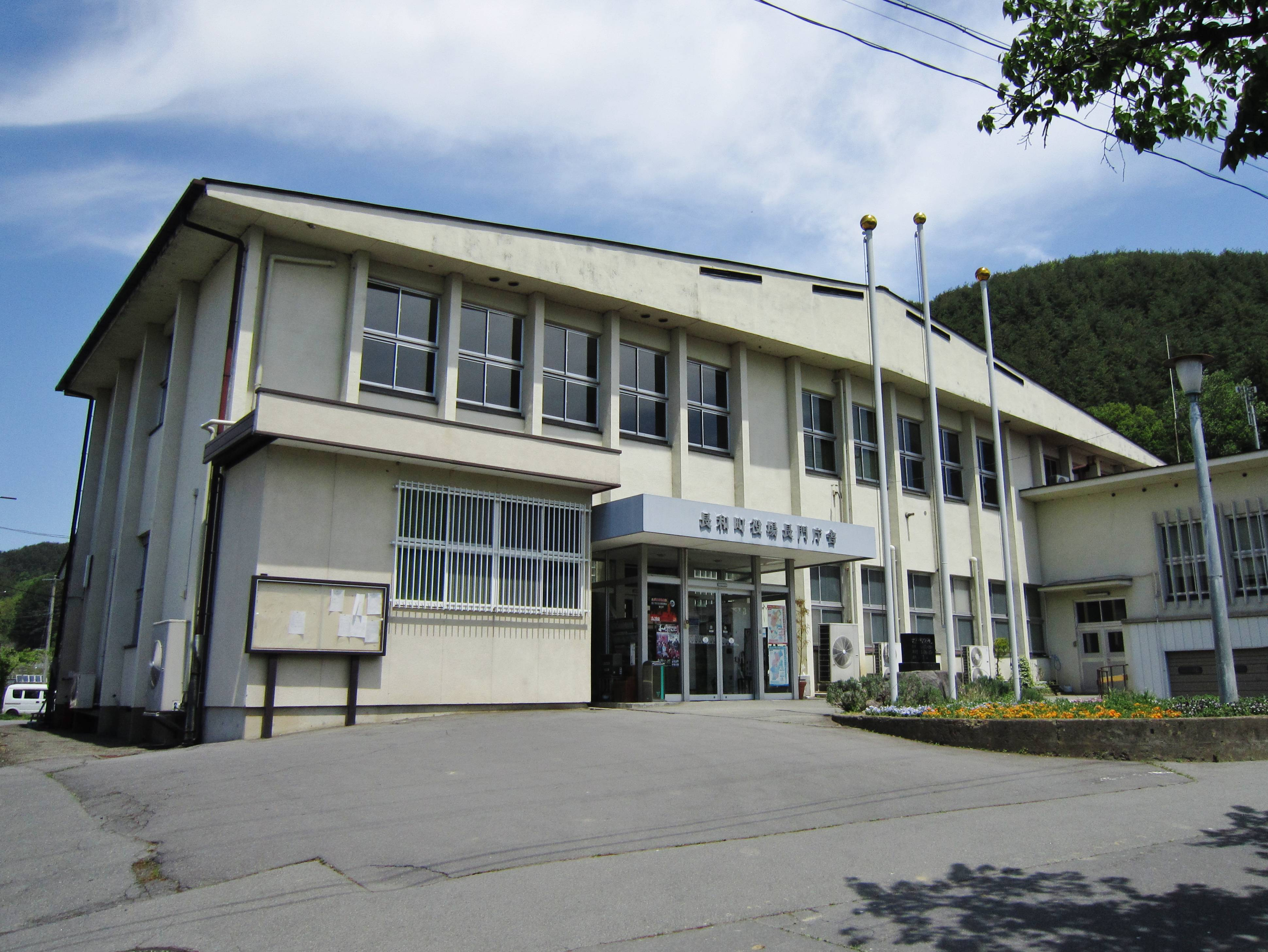
former Nagato Town Hall

Nagato (長門町, Nagato-machi) was a town located in Chiisagata District, Nagano Prefecture, Japan.

As of 2003, the town had an estimated population of 5,138 and a density of 53.44 persons per km^{2}. The total area was 96.14 km^{2}.

On October 1, 2005, Nagato, along with the village of Wada (also from Chiisagata District), was merged to create the town of Nagawa.
