= Kitamimaki, Nagano =

Former village in Nagano prefecture, Japan

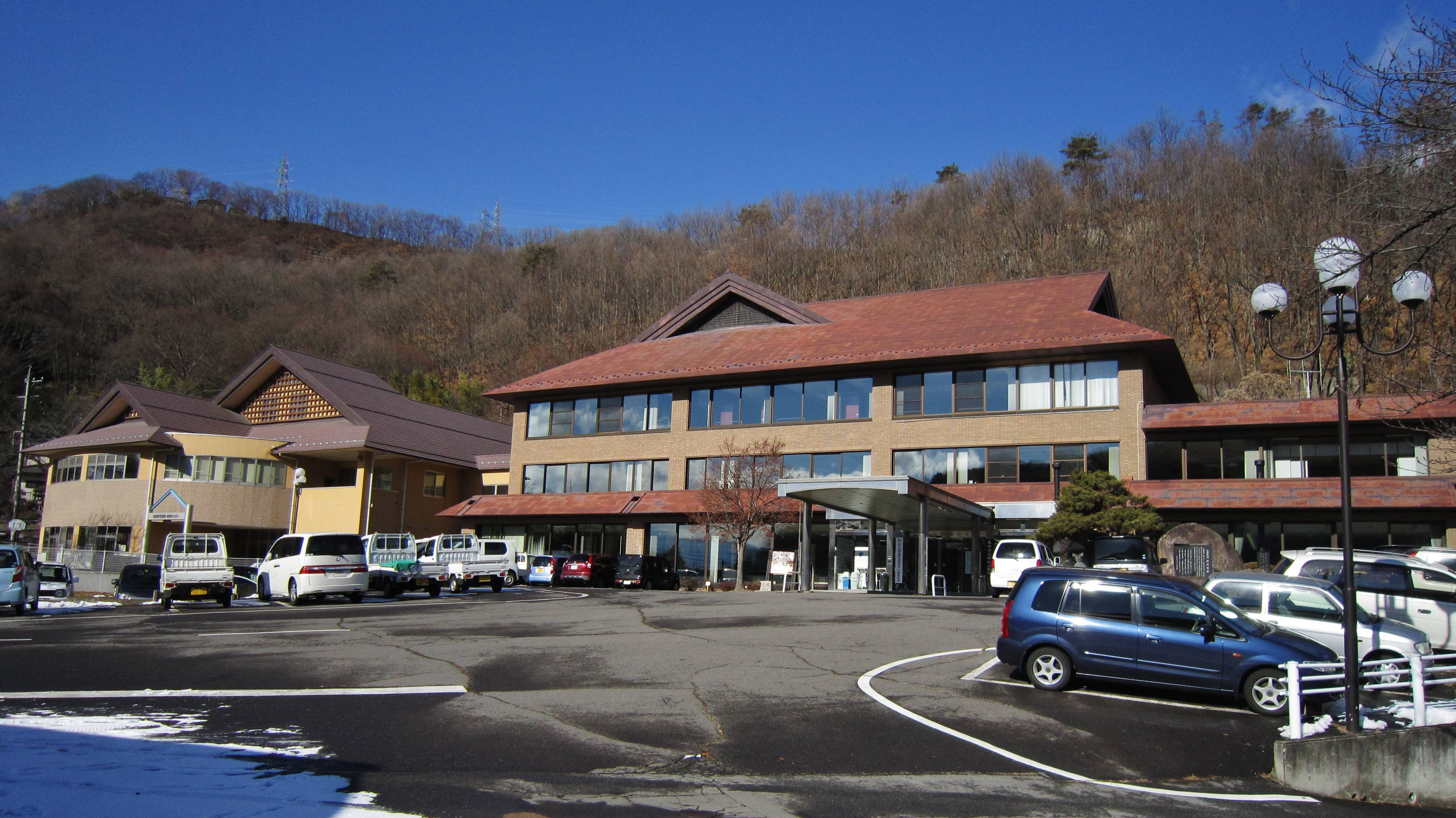
former Kitamimaki Village Hall

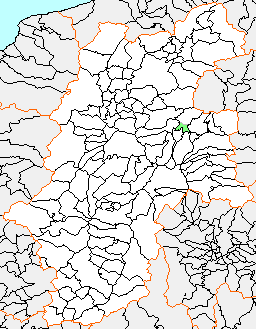
Location map of former Kitamimaki Village

Kitamimaki (北御牧村, Kitamimaki-mura) was a village located in Kitasaku District, Nagano Prefecture, Japan.

As of March 1, 2004, the town had an estimated population of 5,793 and a density of 224.97 persons per km^{2}. The total area was 25.75 km^{2}.

On April 1, 2004, Kitamimaki, along with the town of Tōbu (from Chiisagata District), was merged to create the city of Tōmi.
