= Nagawa, Nagano =

Town in Nagano Prefecture, Japan

Nagawa 長和町
- Town
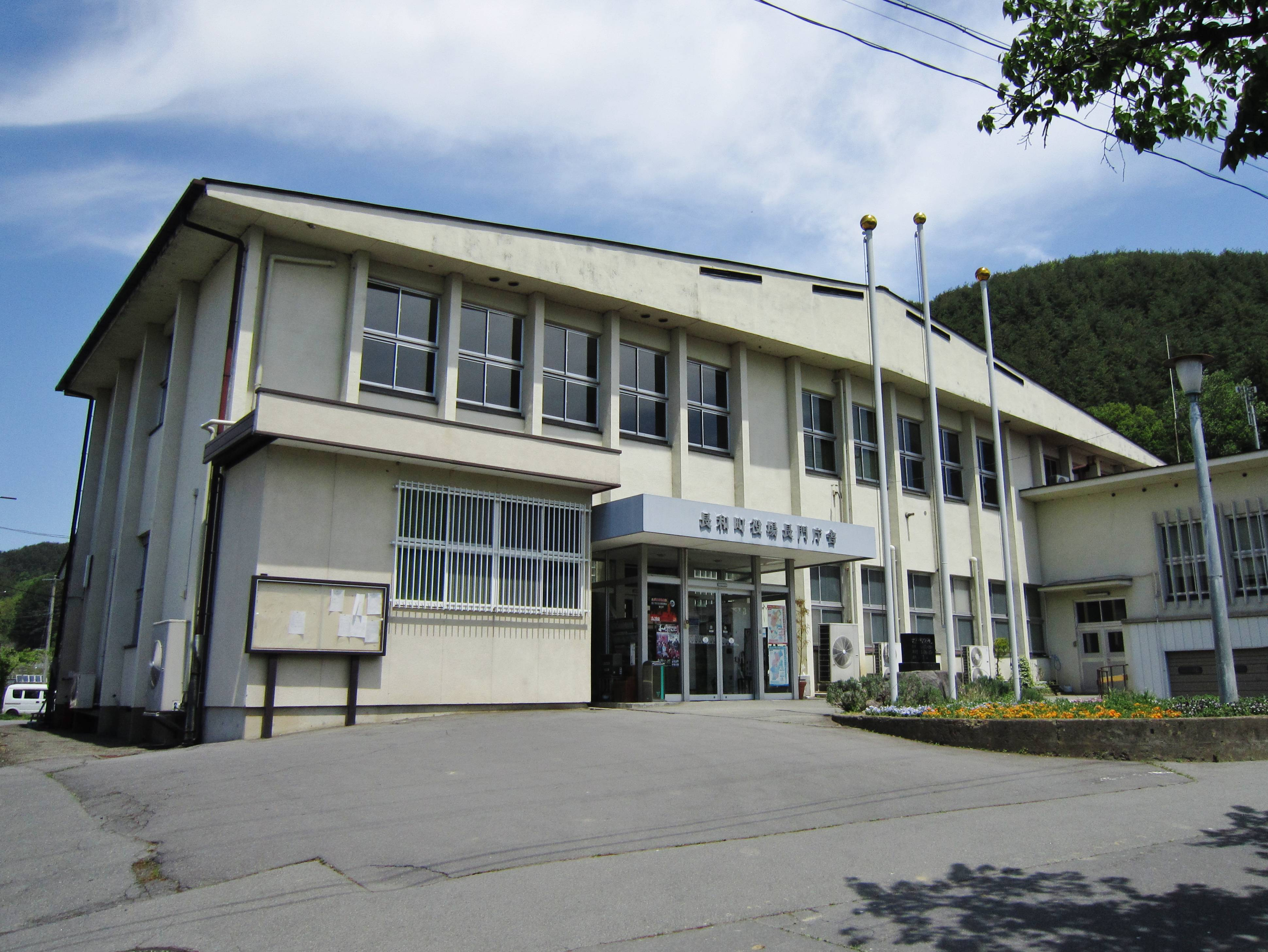
- Nagawa Town Hall

- Flag Seal

- Location of Nagawa in Nagano Prefecture

- Coordinates: 36°15′21.5″N 138°16′4.1″E
- Country: Japan
- Region: Chūbu (Kōshin'etsu)
- Prefecture: Nagano
- District: Chiisagata

Area
  - Total: 183.86 km^{2} (70.99 sq mi)

Population (April 2019)
  - Total: 6,088
  - Density: 33.11/km^{2} (85.76/sq mi)
- Time zone: UTC+9 (Japan Standard Time)
- Symbols
  - Tree: Prunus serrulata
  - Flower: Azalea
  - Bird: Green pheasant
  - Rock: Obsidian
- Phone number: 0268-68-0111
- Address: 525-1 Nagakubo, Nagawa-machi, Chiisagata-gun, Nagano-ken 386-0602
- Website: Official website

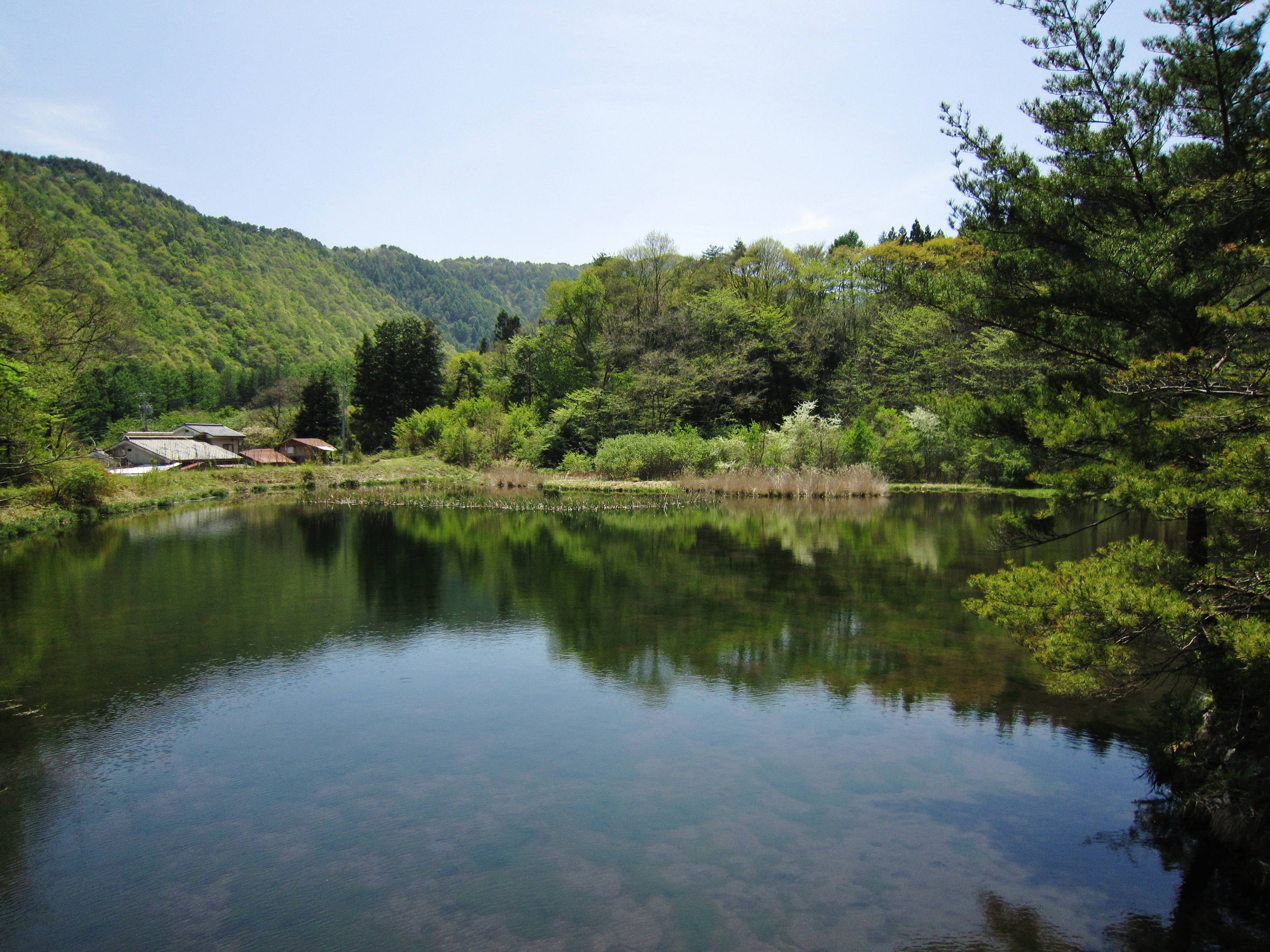
Yonoike Pond in Nagawa

Nagawa (長和町, Nagawa-machi) is a town located in Nagano Prefecture, Japan. As of 1 April 2019, the town had an estimated population of 6,088 in 2,650 households, and a population density of 32.6 persons per km^{2}. The total area of the town is 183.86 square kilometres (70.99 sq mi).

== Geography ==
Nagawa is located in the center of Nagano Prefecture.

=== Surrounding municipalities ===
- Nagano Prefecture
  - Chino
  - Matsumoto
  - Shimosuwa
  - Suwa
  - Tateshina
  - Ueda

=== Climate ===
The town has a climate characterized by characterized by warm and humid summers, and cold, very snowy winters (Köppen climate classification Dfb). The average annual temperature in Nagawa is 8.9 °C. The average annual rainfall is 1388 mm with September as the wettest month. The temperatures are highest on average in August, at around 21.9 °C, and lowest in January, at around -3.6 °C.

== Demographics ==
Per Japanese census data, the population of Nagawa has declined by more than half over the past 70 years.

Historical population
| Year | Pop. | ±% |
|---|---|---|
| 1940 | 9,658 | — |
| 1950 | 12,054 | +24.8% |
| 1960 | 10,854 | −10.0% |
| 1970 | 8,791 | −19.0% |
| 1980 | 8,185 | −6.9% |
| 1990 | 7,984 | −2.5% |
| 2000 | 7,807 | −2.2% |
| 2010 | 6,782 | −13.1% |
| 2020 | 5,600 | −17.4% |

== History ==
The area of present-day Nagawa was part of ancient Shinano Province. The area was part of the holdings of Ueda Domain during the Edo period, and had two stations on the Nakasendō highway connecting Edo with Kyoto: Nagakubo-shuku and Wada-shuku. The modern town of Nagakubo-shinmachi was established on April 1, 1889, by the establishment of the municipalities system and was renamed Nagato on September 1, 1956. The town of Nagawa was formed by the merger of Nagato with the village of Wada (also from Chiisagata District).

== Education ==
Nagawa has two public elementary schools and one public middle school operated by the town government, and one middle school operated jointly between Nagawa and neighboring Ueda city. The town does not have a high school.

== Transportation ==
=== Railway ===
The town does not have any passenger railway service.

=== Highway ===
- National Route 142
- National Route 152
- National Route 254

== Local attractions ==
- Hoshikuso Pass obsidian mine site, a National Historic Site
