= Mitsuoka Station =

Railway station in Komoro, Nagano Prefecture, Japan

Mitsuoka Station 三岡駅
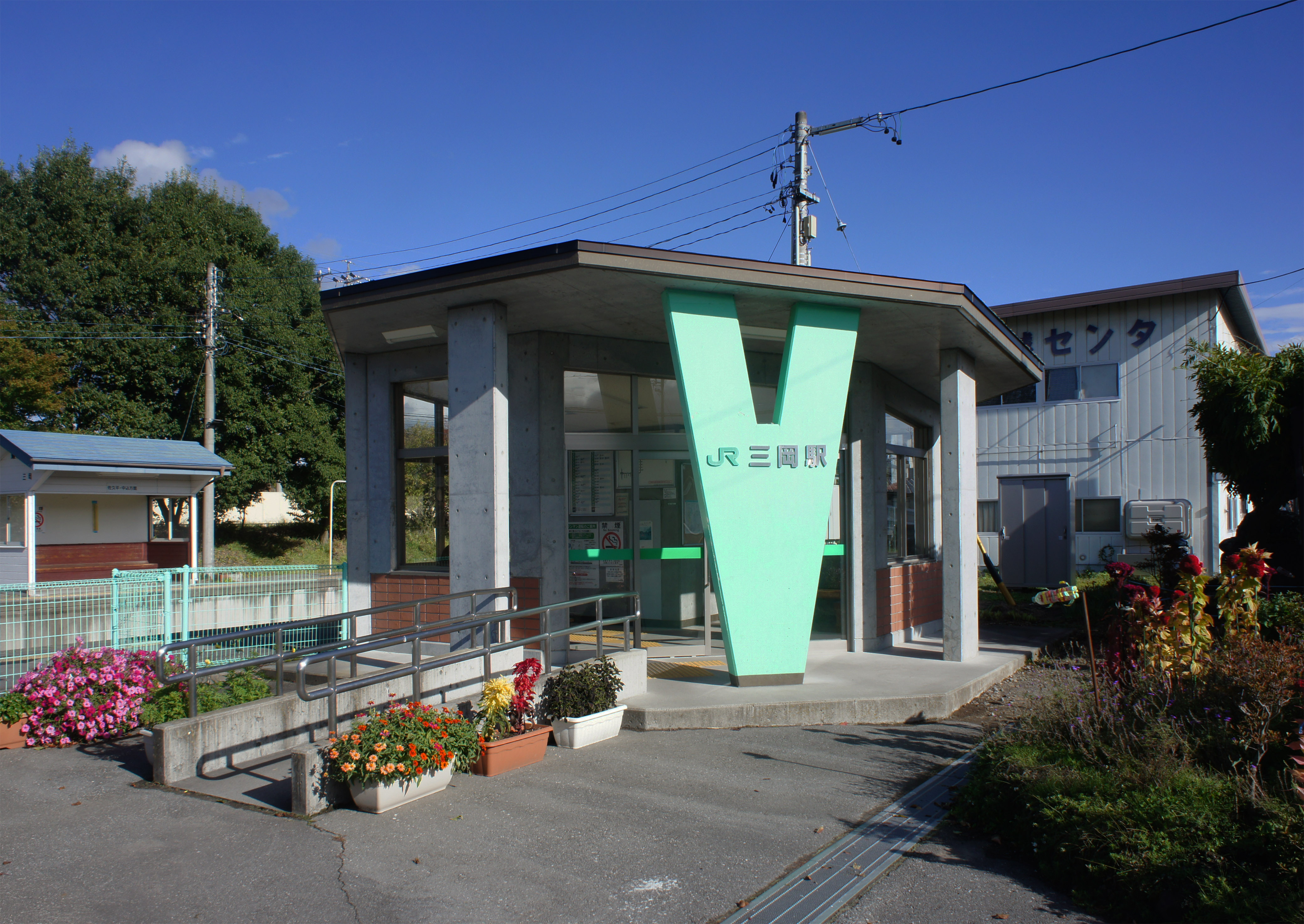
- Mitsuoka Station, October 2021

General information
- Location: 61 Moriyama, Komoro-shi, Nagano-ken 384-0085; Japan
- Coordinates: 36.3044°N 138.4487°E
- Elevation: 705.3 meters
- Operator: JR East
- Line: ■ Koumi Line
- Distance: 77.3 km from Kobuchizawa
- Platforms: 2 side platforms

Other information
- Status: Unstaffed
- Website: Official website

History
- Opened: 14 April 1925

Passengers
- FY2011: 168

Services
Preceding station	JR East	Following station
Otome towards Komoro	Koumi Line	Misato towards Kobuchizawa
Location
- Location within Nagano Prefecture Location within Japan

Mitsuoka Station (三岡駅, Mitsuoka-eki) is a train station in the city of Komoro, Nagano, Japan, operated by East Japan Railway Company (JR East).

== Lines ==
Mitsuoka Station is served by the Koumi Line and is 75.3 kilometers from the terminus of the line at Kobuchizawa Station.

== Station layout ==
The station consists of two opposed ground-level side platforms serving two tracks, connected by a level crossing. The station is unattended.

=== Platforms ===
1	■ Koumi Line	for Komoro
2	■ Koumi Line	for Sakudaira and Kobuchizawa

== History ==
Mitsuoka Station opened on 14 April 1925. With the privatization of Japanese National Railways (JNR) on 1 April 1987, the station came under the control of JR East. The current station building was completed in 2002.

== Surrounding area ==
- National Route 141

== See also ==
- List of railway stations in Japan
