= Sanada, Nagano =

Town in Nagano Prefecture, Japan

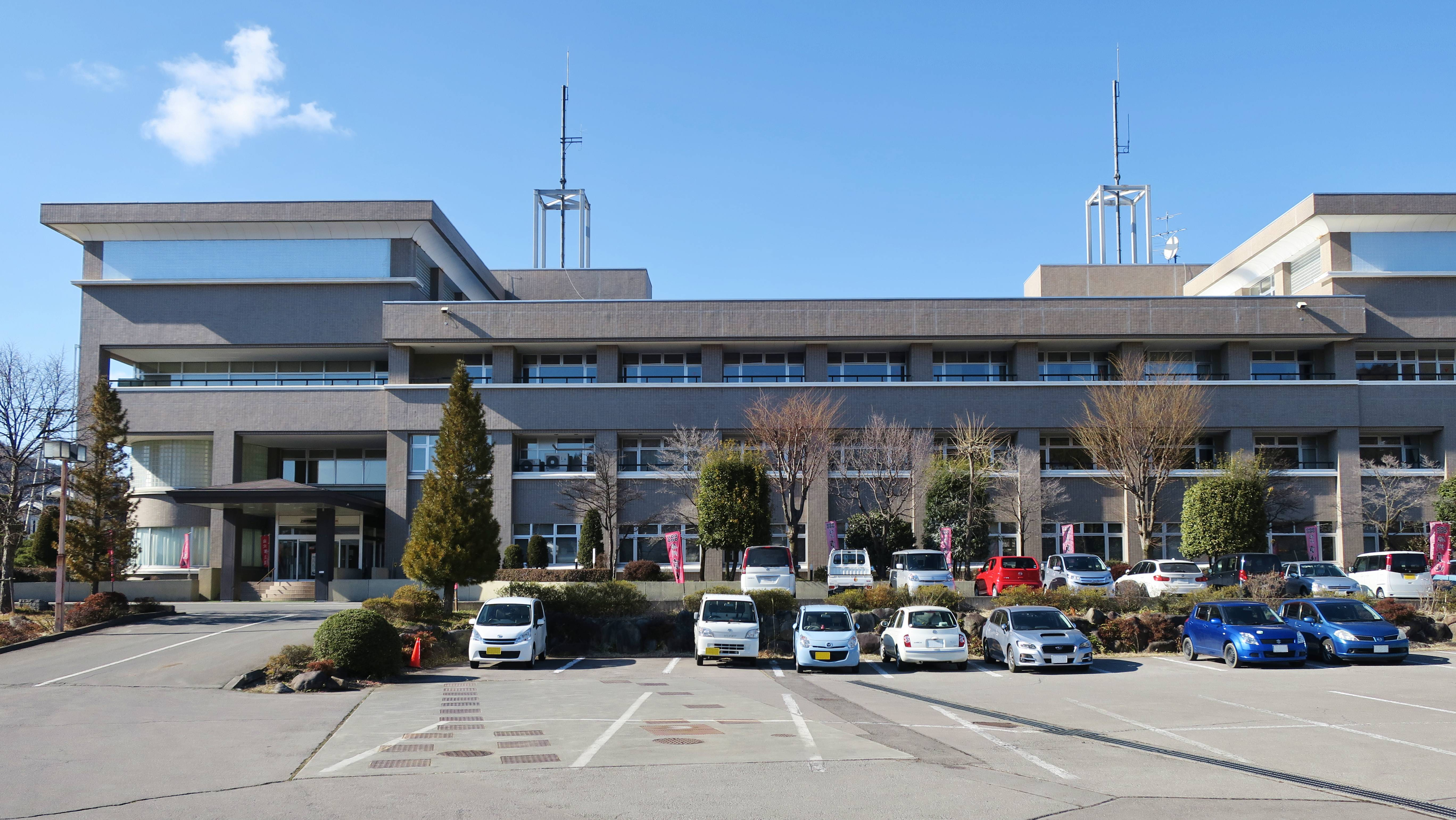
former Sanada town hall

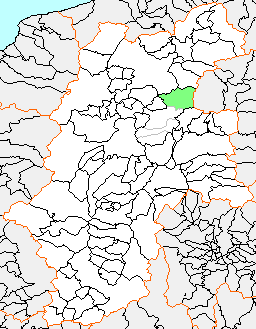
Map of Sanada, Nagano

Sanada (真田町, Sanada-machi) was a town located in Chiisagata District, Nagano Prefecture, Japan.

== Population ==
As of 2003, the town had an estimated population of 11,477 and a density of 63.10 persons per km^{2}. The total area was 181.90 km^{2}.

== History ==
On March 6, 2006 Sanada, along with the old city of Ueda, the town of Maruko, and the village of Takeshi (all from Chiisagata District), to create the new and expanded city of Ueda.

== Sister cities ==
- Kudoyama, Japan (since 1977)
