= Takeshi, Nagano =

Dissolved municipality in Nagano prefecture, Japan

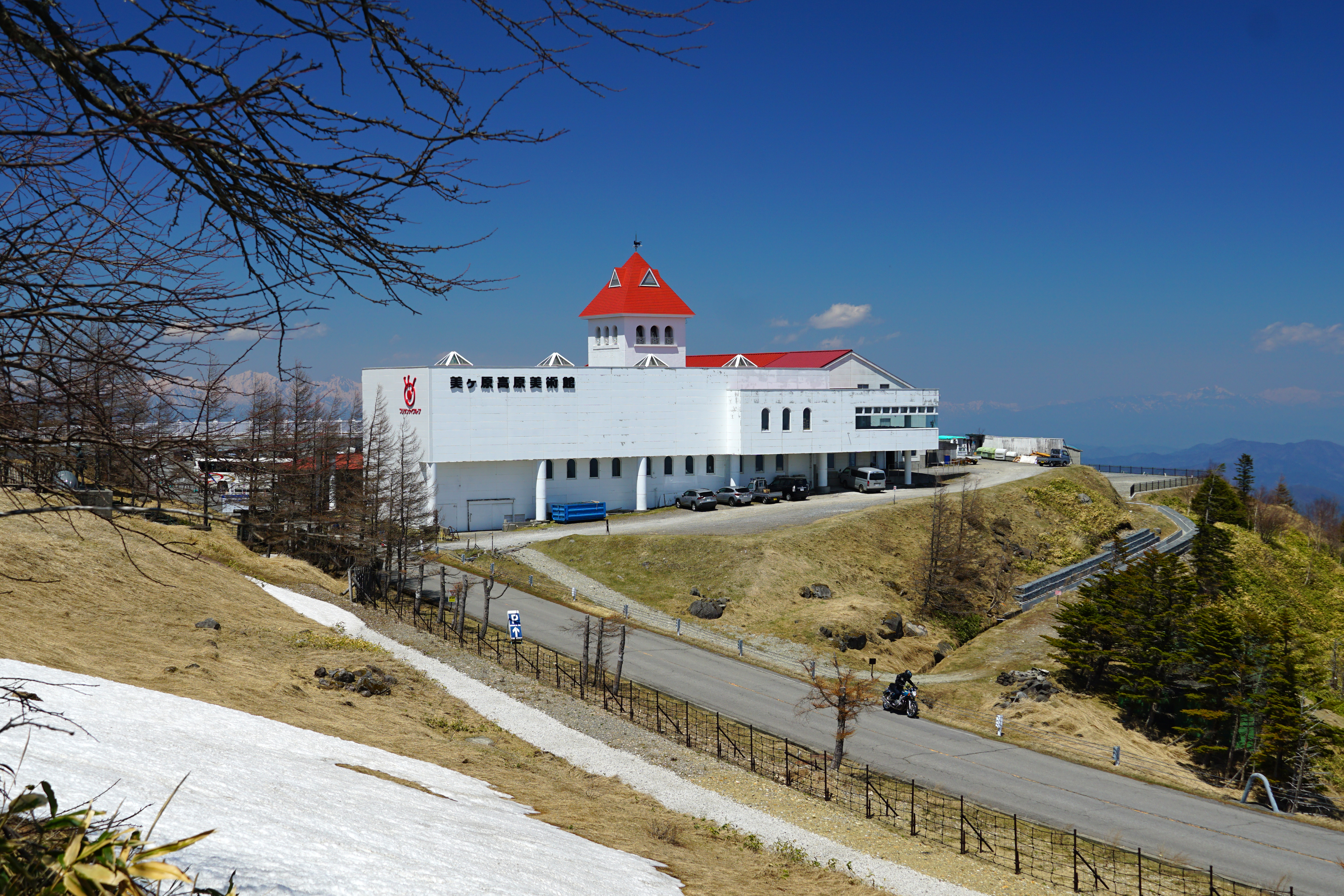
Utsukushi-ga-hara Open-Air Museum

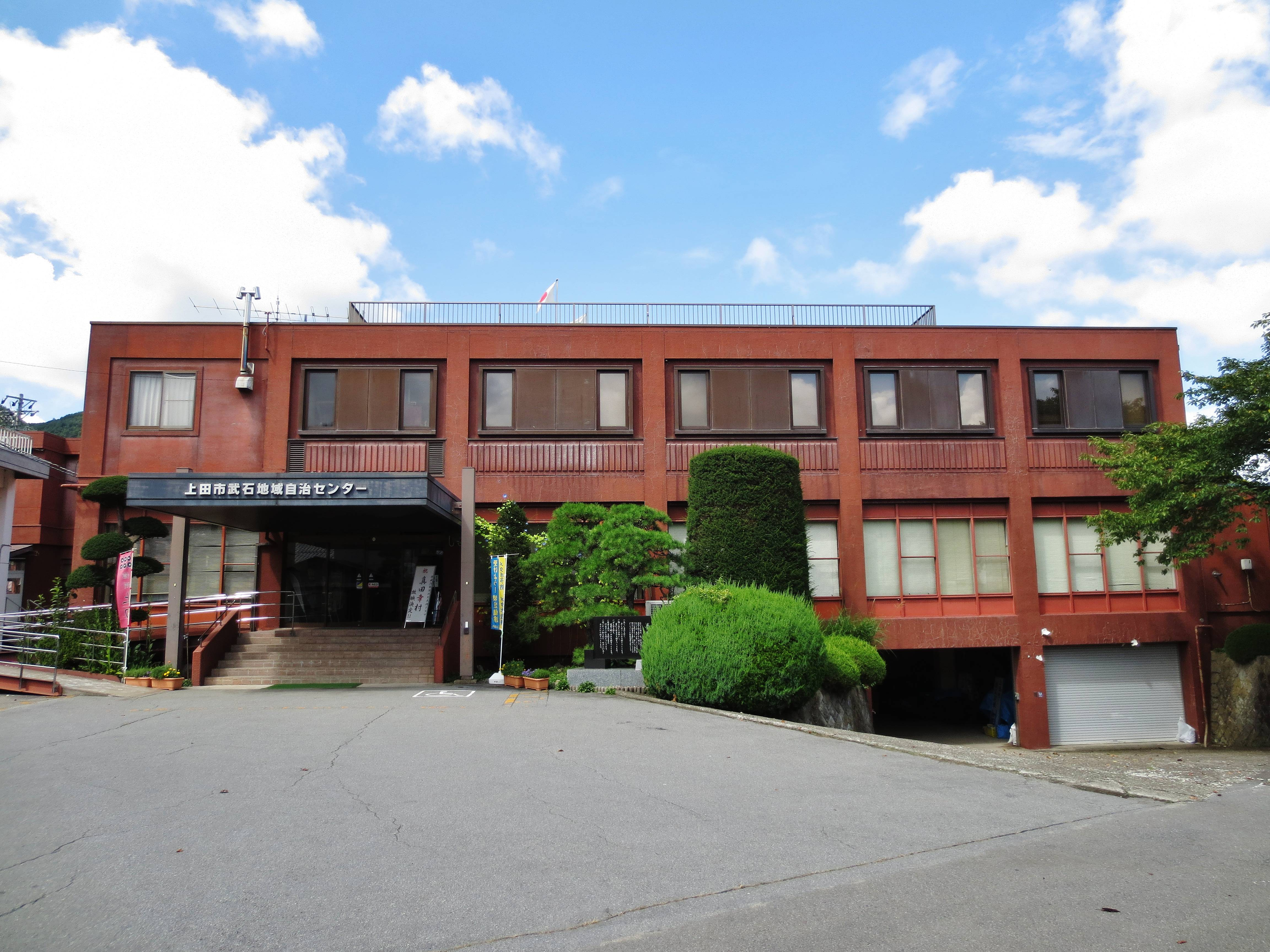
former Takeshi village hall

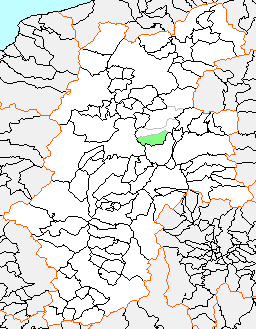
Map of Takeshi, Nagano

Takeshi (武石村, Takeshi-mura) was a village located in Chiisagata District, Nagano Prefecture, Japan.

As of 2003, the village had an estimated population of 4,148 and a density of 47.31 persons per km^{2}. The total area was 87.67 km^{2}.

On March 6, 2006, Takeshi, along with the old city of Ueda, and the towns of Maruko and Sanada (all from Chiisagata District), to create the new and expanded city of Ueda.
