= Maruko, Nagano =

Dissolved municipality in Nagano prefecture, Japan

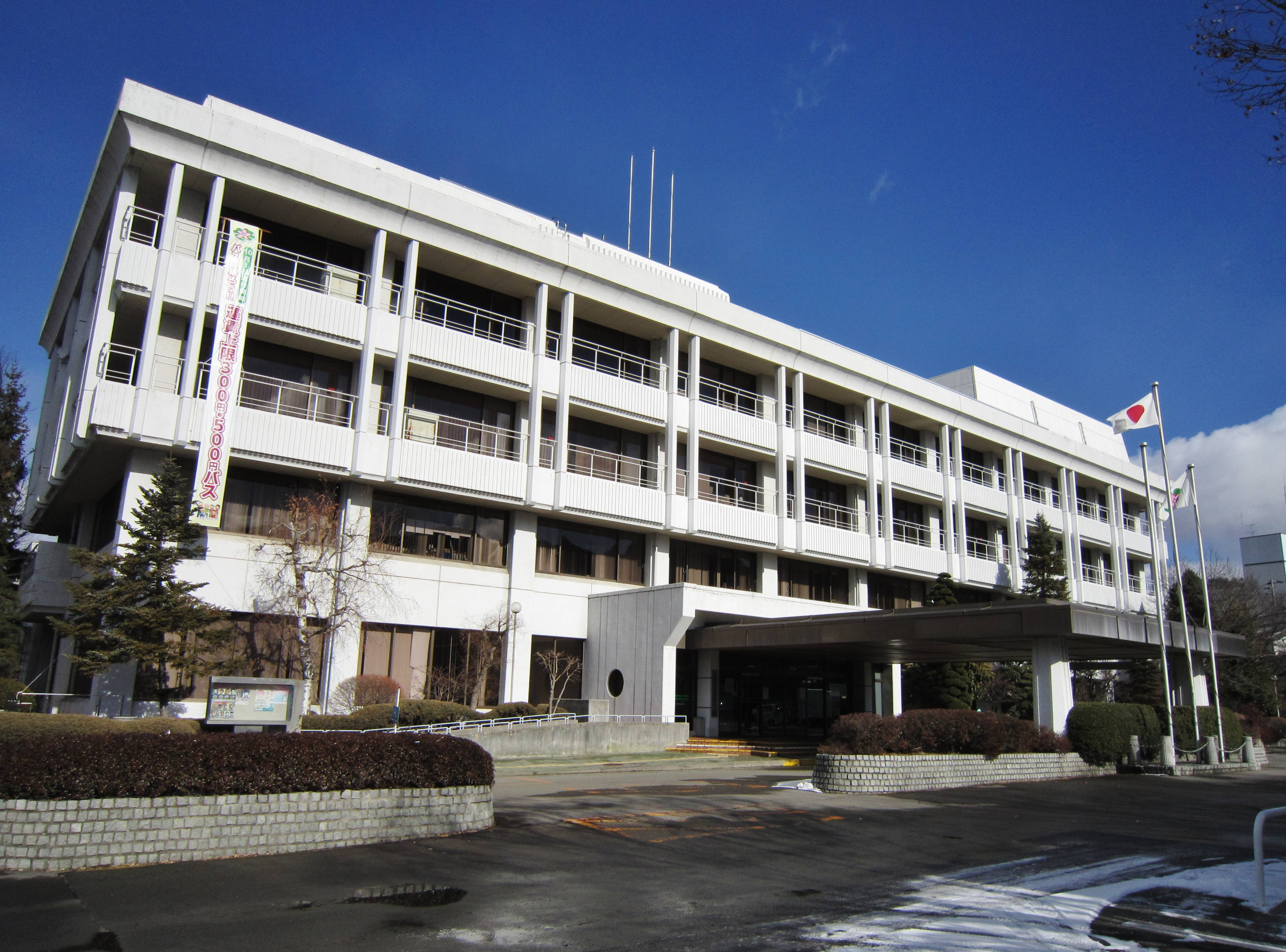
former Maruko Town Hall

Maruko (丸子町, Maruko-machi) was a town located in Chiisagata District, Nagano Prefecture, Japan.

As of 2003, the town had an estimated population of 25,050 and a density of 236.99 persons per km^{2}. The total area was 105.70 km^{2}.

On March 6, 2006, Maruko, along with the old city of Ueda, the town of Sanada, and the village of Takeshi (all from Chiisagata District), merged to create the new and expanded city of Ueda.

Maruko is home to several hot-springs, the most famous being Kakeyu Onsen.
