= Higashi-Komoro Station =

Railway station in Komoro, Nagano Prefecture, Japan

Higashi-Komoro Station 東小諸駅
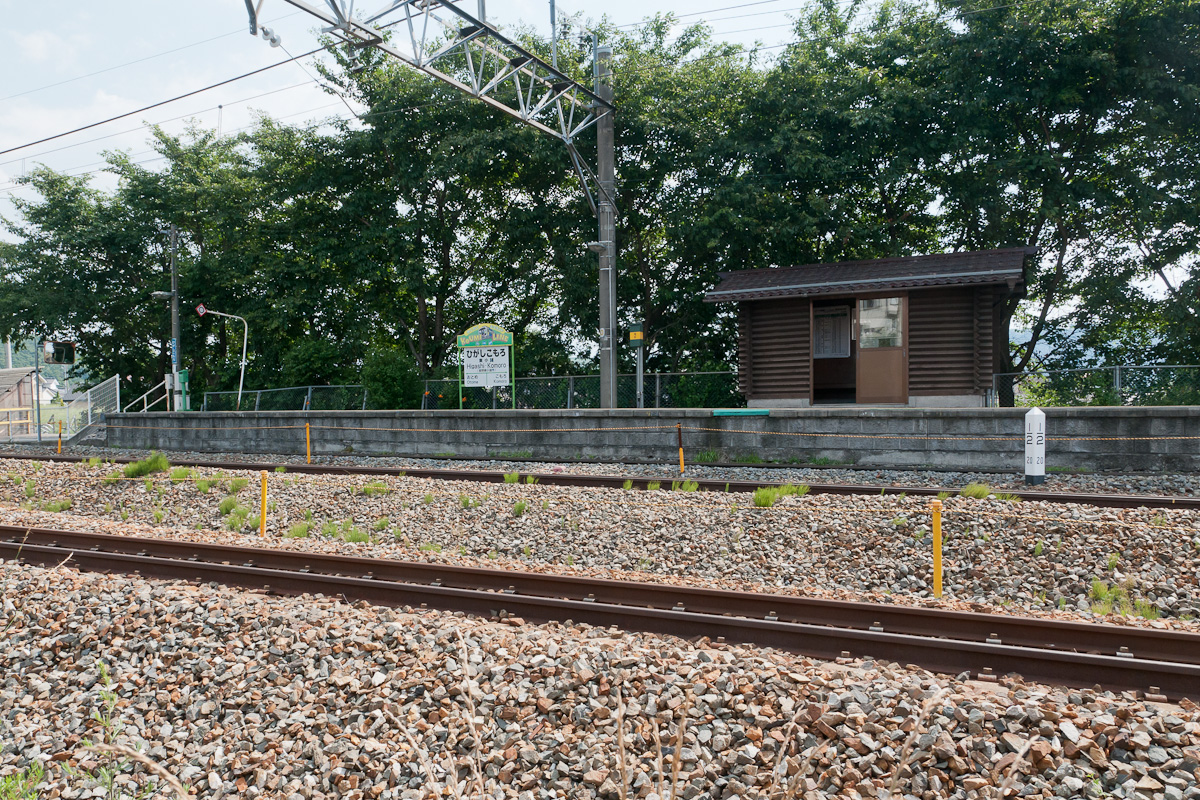
- Higashi-Komoro Station, July 2011

General information
- Location: 1550 Kō, Komoro-shi, Nagano-ken 384-0801; Japan
- Coordinates: 36.3169°N 138.4323°E
- Elevation: 681 meters
- Operator: JR East
- Line: ■ Koumi Line
- Distance: 77.4 km from Kobuchizawa
- Platforms: 1 side platform

Other information
- Status: Unstaffed
- Website: Official website

History
- Opened: 10 July 1952

Passengers
- FY2011: 95

Services
Preceding station	JR East	Following station
Komoro Terminus	Koumi Line	Otome towards Kobuchizawa
Location
- Location within Nagano Prefecture Location within Japan

Higashi-Komoro Station (東小諸駅, Higashi-Komoro-eki) is a train station in the city of Komoro, Nagano, Japan, operated by East Japan Railway Company (JR East).

== Lines ==
Higashi-Komoro Station is served by the Koumi Line and is 77.4 kilometers from the terminus of the line at Kobuchizawa Station.

== Station layout ==
The station consists of one ground-level side platform serving a single bi-directional track. There is no station building, but only a shelter on the platform. The station is unattended.

== History ==
Higashi-Komoro Station opened on 10 July 1952. With the privatization of Japanese National Railways (JNR) on 1 April 1987, the station came under the control of JR East.

== Surrounding area ==
- National Route 141

== See also ==
- List of railway stations in Japan
