= Tōmi Chūō Park =

Park in Tōmi, Japan

- 東御中央公園
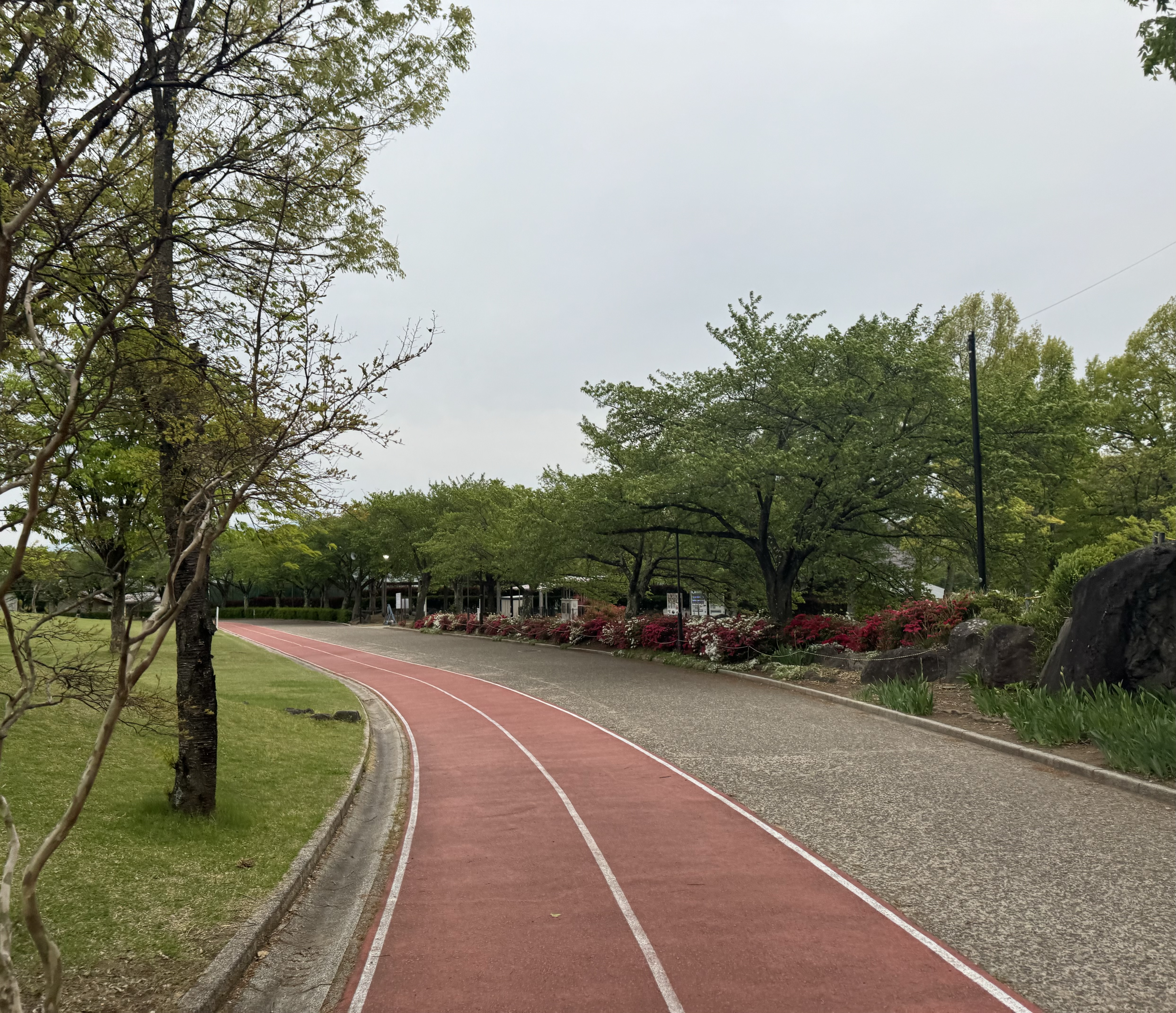
- Tōmi Chuo Park in May 2025
- Interactive map of Tōmi Chūō Park
- Type: City park
- Location: Tōmi, Nagano, Japan
- Coordinates: 36.3625°N 138.3475°E
- Created: 1972
- Collections: Cherry Tree

Tōmi Chūō Park (東御中央公園, Tōmi Chūō Kōen; "Tōmi Central Park") is a city park located in the city of Tōmi in Nagano Prefecture, Japan. This park is also called Shibafu Kōen (芝生公園), which means "lawn park".
