= Intate stone age settlement ruins =

Archaeological site in Japan

- 戌立石器時代住居跡 (Japanese)
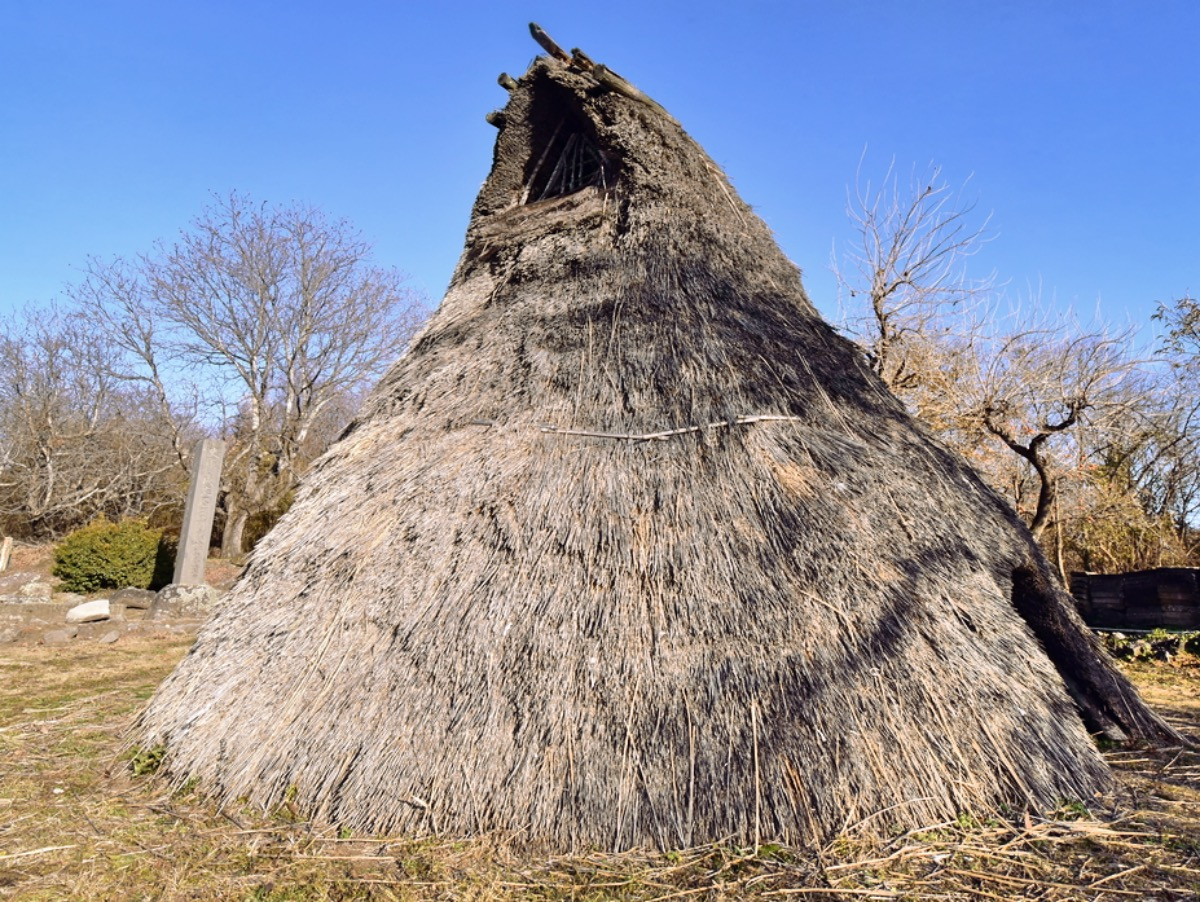
- reconstructed pit house at Intate ruins

- Intate stone age settlement ruins Intate stone age settlement ruins (Japan)
- 36°21′41″N 138°23′07″E
- Type: settlement
- Periods: Jōmon period
- Location: Tōmi, Nagano, Japan
- Region: Chūbu region

Site notes
- Public access: Yes (archaeological park)

The Intate stone age settlement ruins (戌立石器時代住居跡, Intate sekki jidai jūkyo ato) is an archaeological site containing the ruins of a middle to late Jōmon period settlement located in the Shige-no-otsu neighborhood of the city of Tōmi, Nagano in the Chūbu region of Japan. The site was designated a National Historic Site of Japan in 1933.

== Overview ==
The Intate site is located on the southern slopes of a hill with an elevation of 770 meters between the Nishizawa and Osuzawa Rivers. Discovered in 1930, early archaeological excavations uncovered the foundations of a pit dwelling with a cobblestone floor, stone-lined hearth, bone fragments, Jōmon pottery, and a polished stone axe, which led the site to be designated a National Historic Site. A restored pit dwelling, one the first such faux restorations in the country, was constructed on the site to cover the ruins, but it was later destroyed by lightning. Further excavations from 1983 to 1984 discovered that the pit dwelling was part of a much larger village, covering a 63,000 to 80,000 square meter area. Several restored pit houses were reconstructed in 1988, forming an archaeological park. It is located about 40 minutes on foot from Shigeno Station in the Shinano Railway.

== See also ==
- List of Historic Sites of Japan (Nagano)
