= Otome Station =

Railway station in Komoro, Nagano Prefecture, Japan

Otome Station 乙女駅
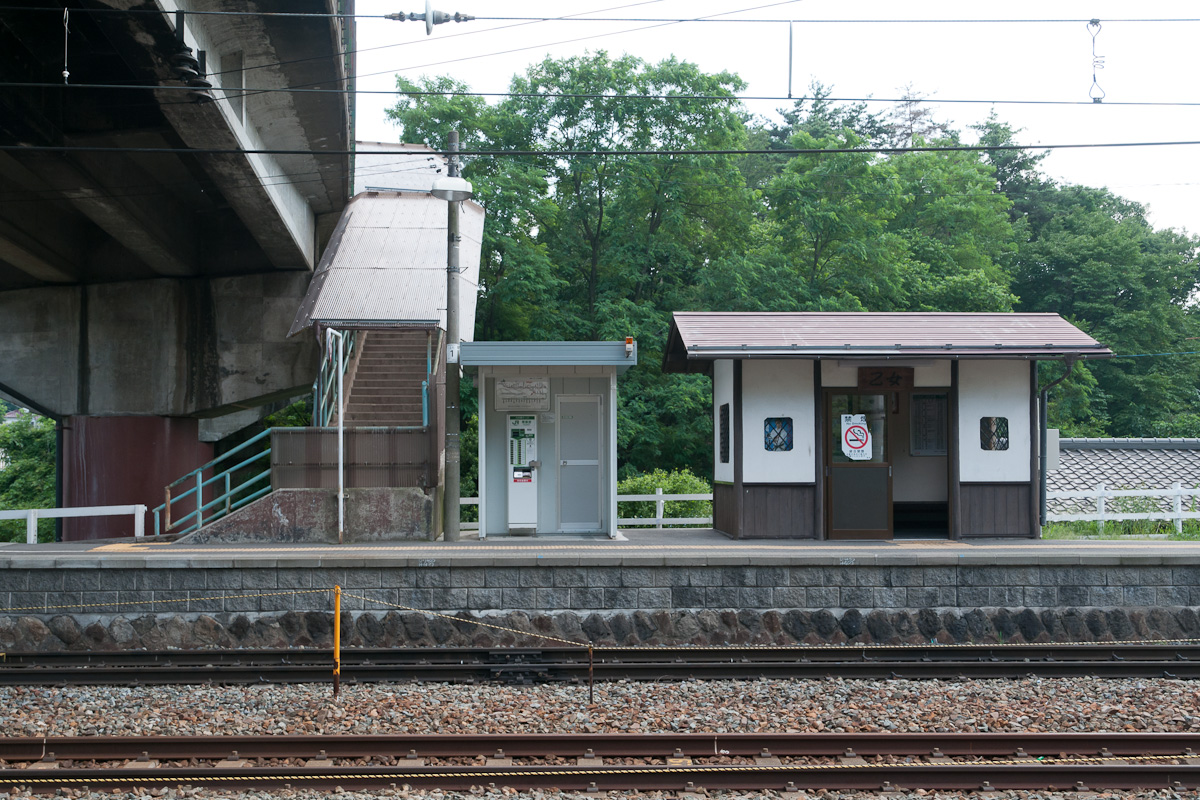
- Otome Station, July 2011

General information
- Location: 1284 Kō, Komoro-shi, Nagano-ken 384-0801; Japan
- Coordinates: 36.3112°N 138.4408°E
- Elevation: 695.7 meters
- Operator: JR East
- Line: ■ Koumi Line
- Distance: 76.4 km from Kobuchizawa
- Platforms: 1 side platform

Other information
- Status: Unstaffed
- Website: Official website

History
- Opened: 8 August 1915

Passengers
- FY2011: 168

Services
Preceding station	JR East	Following station
Higashi-Komoro towards Komoro	Koumi Line	Mitsuoka towards Kobuchizawa
Location
- Location within Nagano Prefecture Location within Japan

Otome Station (乙女駅, Otome-eki) is a train station in the city of Komoro, Nagano, Japan, operated by East Japan Railway Company (JR East).

== Lines ==
Otome Station is served by the Koumi Line and is 76.4 kilometers from the terminus of the line at Kobuchizawa Station.

== Station layout ==
The station consists of one ground-level side platform serving a single bi-directional track. There is no station building, but only a shelter on the platform. The station is unattended.

== History ==
Otome Station opened on 8 August 1915. The station was closed from 1944-1952. With the privatization of Japanese National Railways (JNR) on 1 April 1987, the station came under the control of JR East.

== Surrounding area ==
- National Route 141

== See also ==
- List of railway stations in Japan
