= Tōbu, Nagano =

Dissolved municipality in Nagano prefecture, Japan

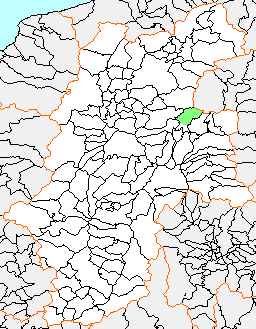
Location of Tōbu in Nagano Prefecture

Tōbu (東部町, Tobu-machi) was a town located in Chiisagata District, Nagano Prefecture, Japan.

As of March 1, 2004, the town had an estimated population of 26,392 and a density of 304.93 persons per km^{2}. The total area was 86.55 km^{2}.

On April 1, 2004, Tōbu, along with the village of Kitamimaki (from Kitasaku District), was merged to create the city of Tōmi.
