= Tōmi, Nagano =

Tōmi 東御市
- City
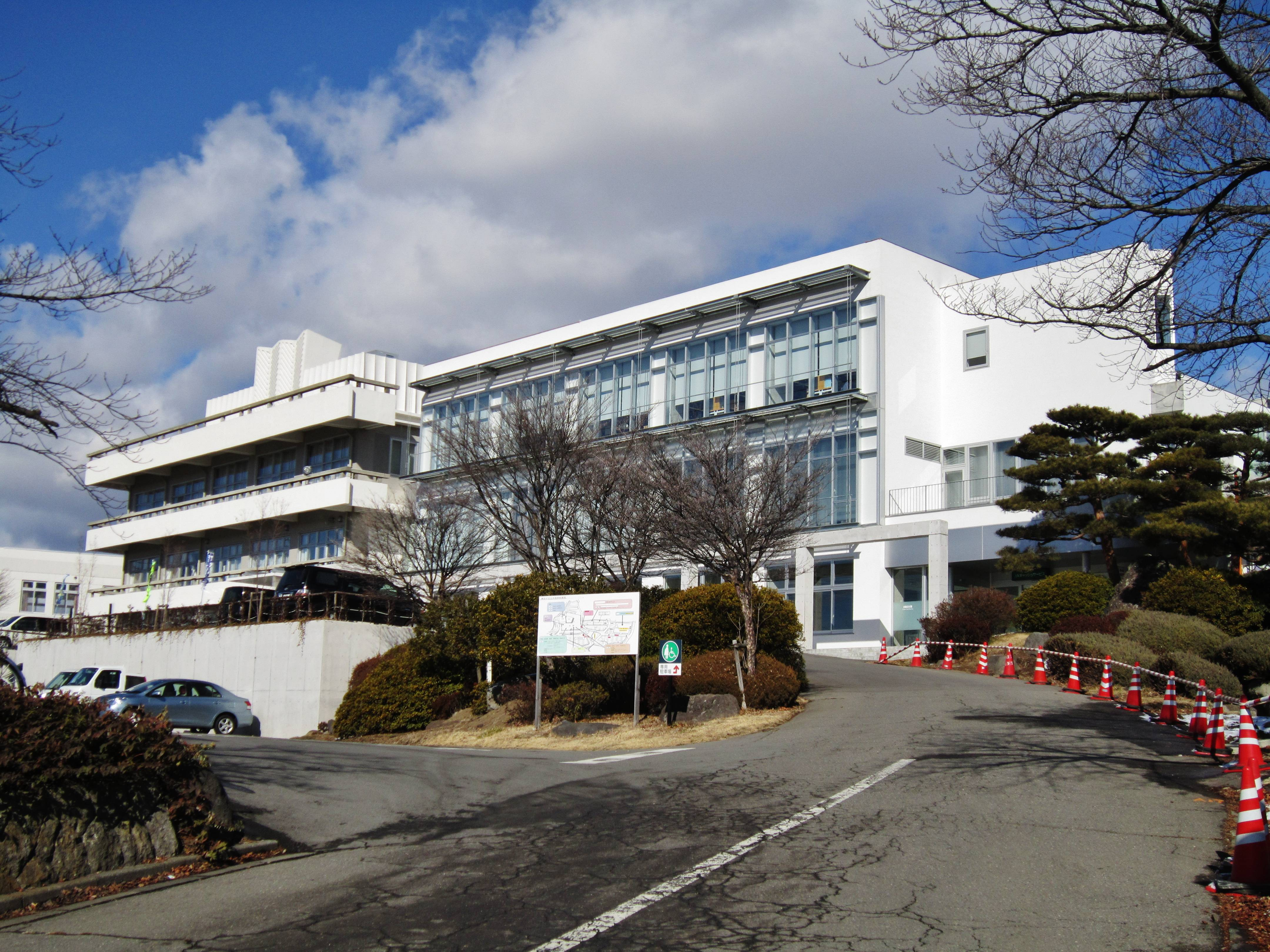
- Tōmi City Hall

- Flag Seal

- Location of Tōmi in Nagano Prefecture

- Coordinates: 36°21′33.8″N 138°19′49.4″E
- Country: Japan
- Region: Chūbu (Kōshin'etsu)
- Prefecture: Nagano

Area
  - Total: 112.37 km^{2} (43.39 sq mi)

Population (June 1, 2019)
  - Total: 29,440
  - Density: 262.0/km^{2} (678.6/sq mi)
- Time zone: UTC+9 (Japan Standard Time)
- Address: 281-2 Agata, Tōmi-shi, Nagano-ken 389-0592
- Climate: Dwb
- Website: Official website
- Symbols
- Flower: Azalea
- Tree: Black Walnut

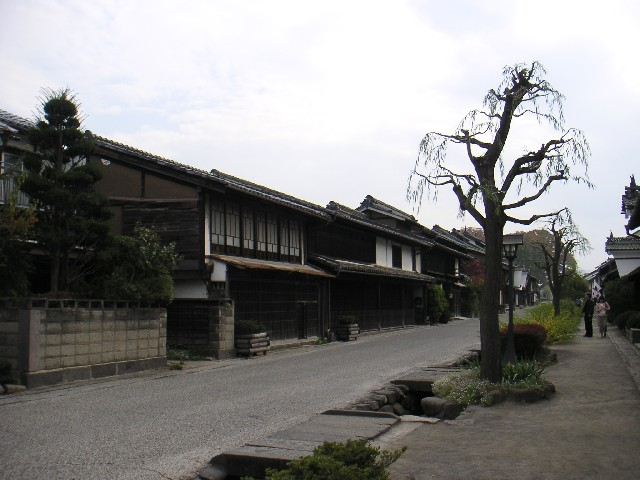
Unno-juku in Tōmi

Tōmi (東御市, Tōmi-shi) is a city located in Nagano Prefecture, Japan. As of 1 June 2019, the city had an estimated population of 29,440 in 12,068 households, and a population density of 262 persons per km². The total area of the city is 112.37 square kilometres (43.39 sq mi).

== Geography ==
Tōmi is located in east-central Nagano Prefecture, at an elevation of between 500 and 1000 meters. The city is bordered by the Joshinetsu Kogen National Park to the north, and Mount Tateshina and Mount Yatsugatake to the south. The Chikuma River divides the city into two parts.

=== Surrounding municipalities ===
- Gunma Prefecture
  - Tsumagoi
- Nagano Prefecture
  - Komoro
  - Saku
  - Tateshina
  - Ueda

== Climate ==
Due to its elevation, the city has a climate characterized by hot and humid summers, and cold, very snowy winters (Köppen Dwb). The average annual temperature in Tōmi is 9.5 °C (49.1 °F). The average annual rainfall is 1,013.2 mm (39.89 in) with July as the wettest month. The temperatures are highest on average in August, at around 21.8 °C (71.2 °F), and lowest in January, at around −2.6 °C (27.3 °F).

Climate data for Tōmi (1991–2020 normals, extremes 1978–present)
Month	Jan	Feb	Mar	Apr	May	Jun	Jul	Aug	Sep	Oct	Nov	Dec	Year
Record high °C (°F)	14.2 (57.6)	19.8 (67.6)	23.9 (75.0)	27.6 (81.7)	30.1 (86.2)	33.3 (91.9)	33.6 (92.5)	33.5 (92.3)	33.3 (91.9)	27.4 (81.3)	24.1 (75.4)	19.8 (67.6)	33.6 (92.5)
Mean daily maximum °C (°F)	2.4 (36.3)	3.6 (38.5)	8.0 (46.4)	14.7 (58.5)	20.0 (68.0)	22.9 (73.2)	26.6 (79.9)	27.8 (82.0)	23.2 (73.8)	17.1 (62.8)	11.7 (53.1)	5.6 (42.1)	15.3 (59.5)
Daily mean °C (°F)	−2.6 (27.3)	−2.0 (28.4)	1.9 (35.4)	8.0 (46.4)	13.5 (56.3)	17.2 (63.0)	21.1 (70.0)	21.8 (71.2)	17.6 (63.7)	11.3 (52.3)	5.7 (42.3)	0.3 (32.5)	9.5 (49.1)
Mean daily minimum °C (°F)	−7.4 (18.7)	−7.1 (19.2)	−3.6 (25.5)	1.8 (35.2)	7.5 (45.5)	12.6 (54.7)	17.0 (62.6)	17.6 (63.7)	13.4 (56.1)	6.7 (44.1)	0.6 (33.1)	−4.4 (24.1)	4.6 (40.3)
Record low °C (°F)	−14.3 (6.3)	−15.9 (3.4)	−13.2 (8.2)	−9.3 (15.3)	−3.3 (26.1)	2.4 (36.3)	8.3 (46.9)	6.8 (44.2)	2.2 (36.0)	−2.9 (26.8)	−8.7 (16.3)	−13.8 (7.2)	−15.9 (3.4)
Average precipitation mm (inches)	31.8 (1.25)	33.2 (1.31)	60.6 (2.39)	62.2 (2.45)	86.8 (3.42)	120.5 (4.74)	156.4 (6.16)	122.4 (4.82)	146.3 (5.76)	118.3 (4.66)	46.6 (1.83)	28.3 (1.11)	1,013.2 (39.89)
Average precipitation days (≥ 1.0 mm)	5.7	6.0	8.1	8.3	9.2	11.7	13.7	11.0	10.3	8.9	6.2	5.8	104.8
Mean monthly sunshine hours	179.4	184.7	203.6	209.0	217.6	157.3	168.2	193.1	149.5	164.7	174.0	180.1	2,181.1
Source: Japan Meteorological Agency (1991–2020 normals, extremes 1978–present)

== History ==
Tōmi is located in former Shinano Province and developed as a series of post stations on the Hokkoku Kaidō. The modern city of Tōmi was established on April 1, 2004, from the merger of the village of Kitamimaki (from Kitasaku District) and the town of Tōbu (from Chiisagata District).

== Demographics ==
Per Japanese census data, the population of Tōmi has remained relatively steady over the past 70 years.

Historical population
Year	Pop.	±%
1940	25,605	—
1950	31,145	+21.6%
1960	26,132	−16.1%
1970	24,626	−5.8%
1980	26,841	+9.0%
1990	28,954	+7.9%
2000	30,944	+6.9%
2010	30,703	−0.8%
2020	30,122	−1.9%

== Government ==
Tōmi has a mayor-council form of government with a directly elected mayor and a unicameral city legislature of 17 members.

== Economy ==
Tōmi is a regional commercial center. Notable agricultural products include rice, walnuts and grapes. Nissin Kogyo, an automotive parts company specializing in the manufacture of braking systems for 2- and 4-wheeled vehicles, has its headquarters in the city.

== Education ==
Tōmi has four public elementary schools and one public middle school operated by the city government, and one public high school operated by the Nagano Prefectural Board of Education. Previously the city had a Brazilian school, Colégio Pitágoras-Brasil. It moved to Minowa and changed its name to Nagano Nippaku Gakuen.

== Transportation ==
=== Railway ===
- Shinano Railway - Shinano Railway Line
  - Shigeno - Tanaka

=== Highway ===
- Jōshin-etsu Expressway
- National Route 18

== International relations ==
- Madras, Oregon, United States

== Local attractions ==
- Intate stone age settlement ruins, Jomon period settlement trace and archaeological park, a National Historic Site
- Un-no-Juku, a post station on the Hokkoku Kaidō
- Tōmi Chūō Park, a park with playgrounds

== Notable people ==
- Mochizuki Chiyome
- Raiden Tameemon (1767–1825), sumo wrestler
- Keiichi Tsuchiya (born 1956), racing driver
