= Iwamurada Station =

Railway station in Saku, Nagano Prefecture, Japan

Iwamurada Station 岩村田駅
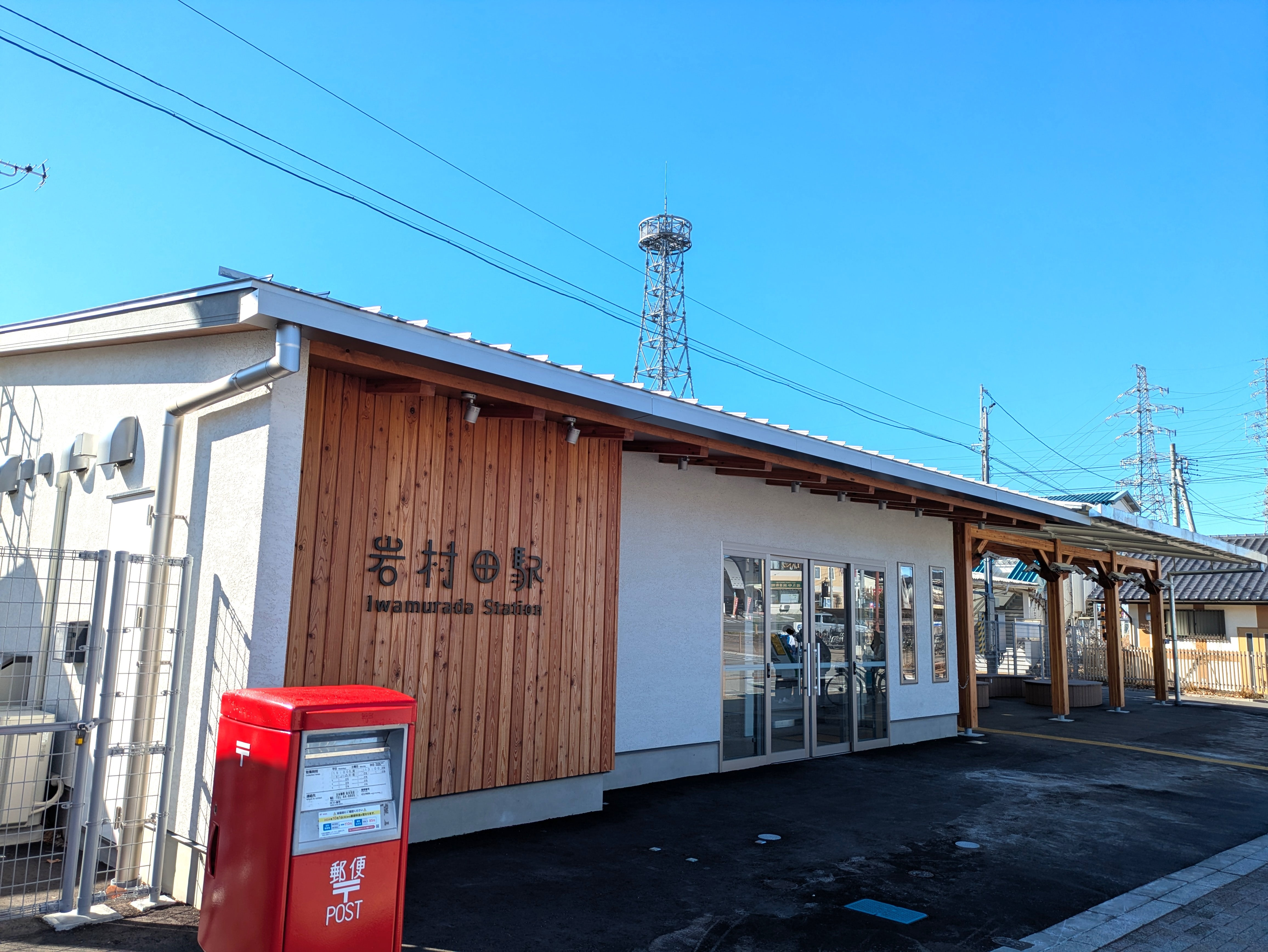
- Iwamurada Station, December 2025

General information
- Location: 1128 Iwamurada, Saku-shi, Nagano-ken 385-0022; Japan
- Coordinates: 36°16′28.53″N 138°28′20.41″E
- Elevation: 705.9 meters
- Operator: JR East
- Line: ■ Koumi Line
- Distance: 70.6 km from Kobuchizawa
- Platforms: 2 side platforms

Other information
- Status: Staffed
- Website: Official website

History
- Opened: 8 August 1915

Passengers
- FY2015: 1257

Services
Preceding station	JR East	Following station
Sakudaira towards Komoro	Koumi Line	Kita-Nakagomi towards Kobuchizawa
Location
- Location within Nagano Prefecture Location within Japan

Iwamurada Station (岩村田駅, Iwamurada-eki) is a railway station in the city of Saku, Nagano, Japan, operated by the East Japan Railway Company (JR East).

== Lines ==
Iwamurada Station is served by the Koumi Line and is 70.6 kilometers from the terminus of the line at Kobuchizawa Station.

== Station layout ==
The station consists of two ground-level side platforms connected by a level crossing. The station is staffed.

=== Platforms ===
1	■ Koumi Line	for Nakagomi and Kobuchizawa
2	■ Koumi Line	for Sakudaira and Komoro

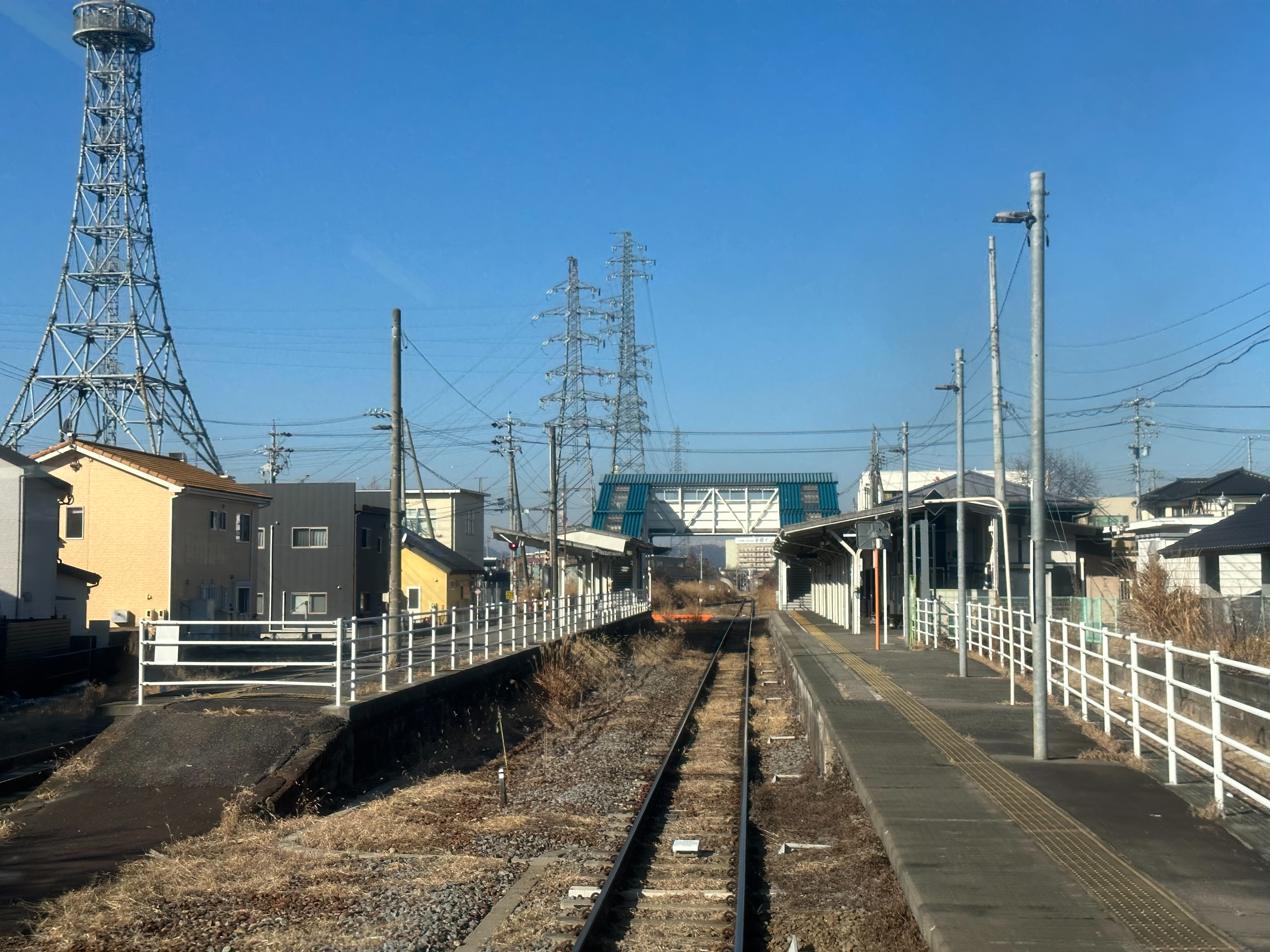
The platforms

== History ==
Iwamurada Station opened on 8 August 1915. With the dissolution and privatization of Japanese National Railways on 1 April 1987, the station came under the control of the East Japan Railway Company (JR East).

== Passenger statistics ==
In fiscal 2015, the station was used by an average of 1257 passengers daily (boarding passengers only).

== Surrounding area ==
- Iwamurada High School
- Sakudaura General Technical School
- Saku Chosei High School

== See also ==
- List of railway stations in Japan
