= Kita-Nakagomi Station =

Railway station in Saku, Nagano Prefecture, Japan

Kita-Nakagomi Station 北中込駅
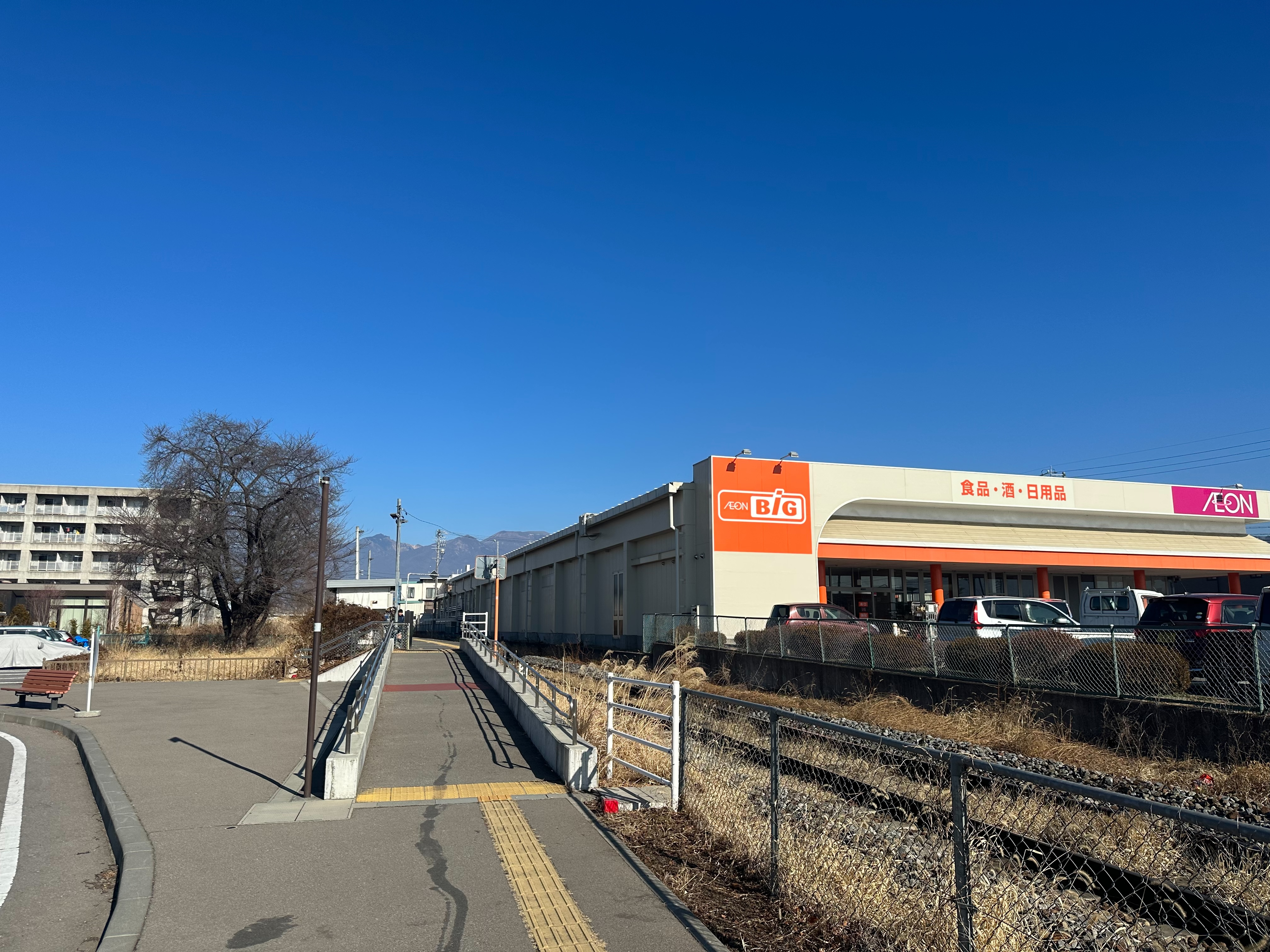
- Slope to Kita-Nakagomi Station platform, December 2023

General information
- Location: 3230 Namezu, Saku-shi, Nagano-ken 385-0051; Japan
- Coordinates: 36.2548°N 138.4764°E
- Elevation: 692.4 meters
- Operator: JR East
- Line: ■ Koumi Line
- Distance: 68.4 km from Kobuchizawa
- Platforms: 1 side platform

Other information
- Status: Unstaffed
- Website: Official website

History
- Opened: 8 August 1915
- Former names: Kubo Station (to 1944)

Passengers
- FY2011: 282

Services
Preceding station	JR East	Following station
Iwamurada towards Komoro	Koumi Line	Namezu towards Kobuchizawa
Location
- Location within Nagano Prefecture Location within Japan

Kita-Nakagomi Station (北中込駅, Kita-Nakagomi-eki) is a train station in the city of Saku, Nagano, Japan, operated by East Japan Railway Company (JR East).

== Lines ==
Kita-Nakagomi Station is served by the Koumi Line and is 68.4 kilometers from the terminus of the line at Kobuchizawa Station.

== Station layout ==
The station consists of one ground-level side platform serving a single bi-directional track. There is no station building, but only a shelter on the platform. The station is unattended.

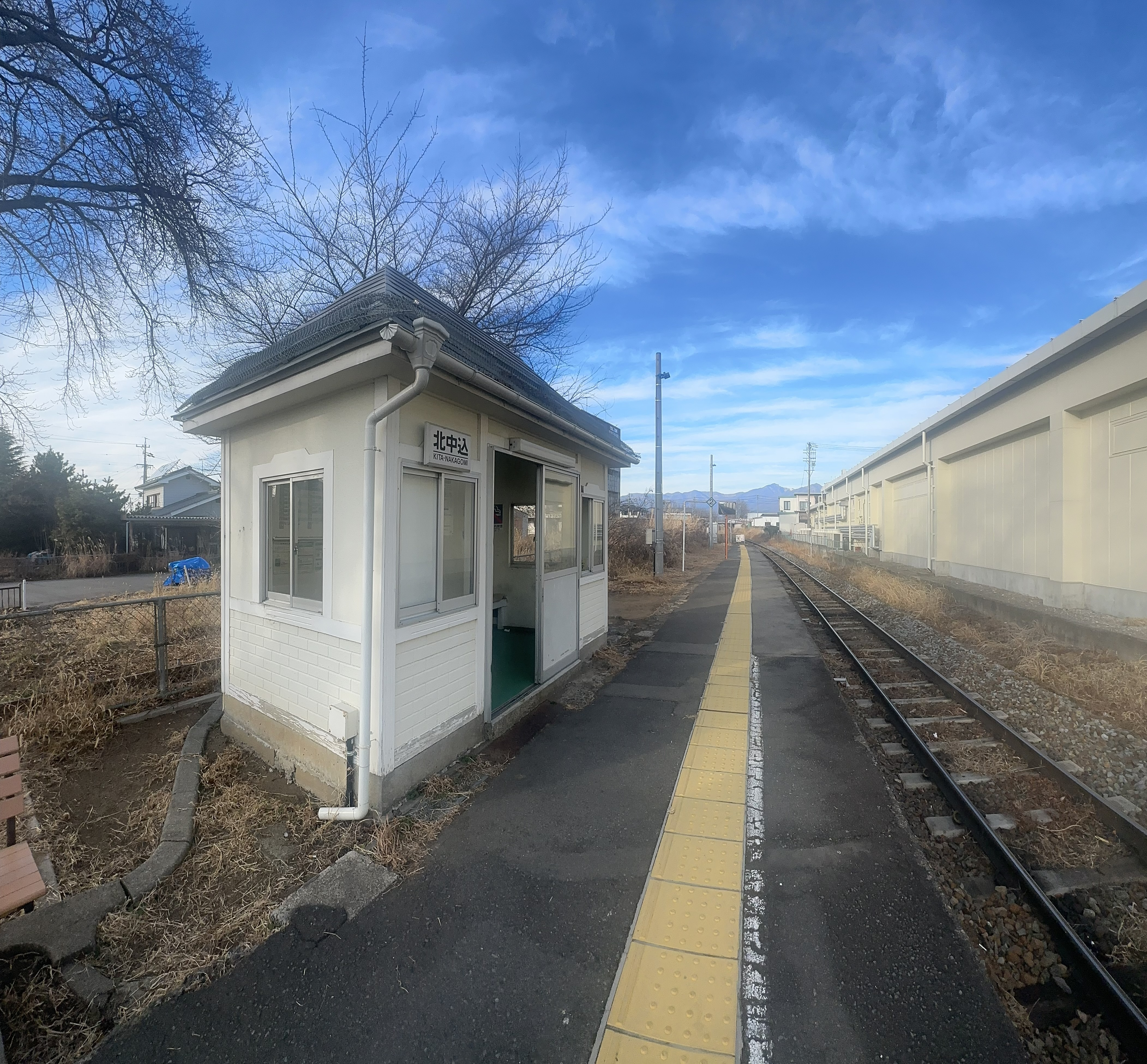
The shelter on the platform, 2023

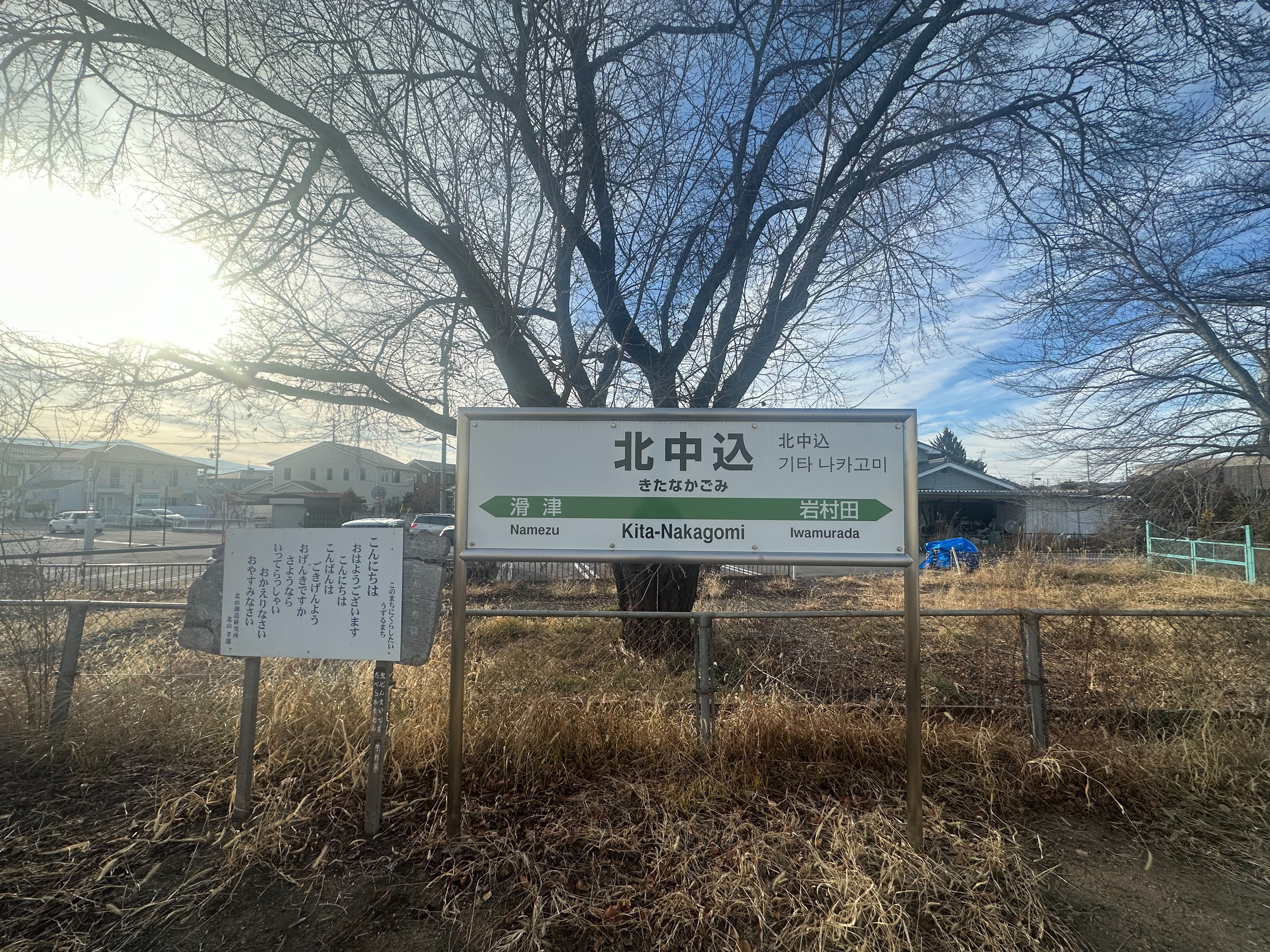
The station sign

== History ==
Kita-Nakagomi Station opened on 8 August 1915 as the 久保停留所 (Kubo Stop). It was elevated to a full station on 1 September 1934, and renamed to its present name on 1 March 1944. With the dissolution and privatization of JNR on April 1, 1987, the station came under the control of the East Japan Railway Company (JR East).

== Surrounding area ==
- Saku City Hall

== See also ==
- List of railway stations in Japan
