= Namezu Station =

Railway station in Saku, Nagano Prefecture, Japan

Namezu Station 滑津駅
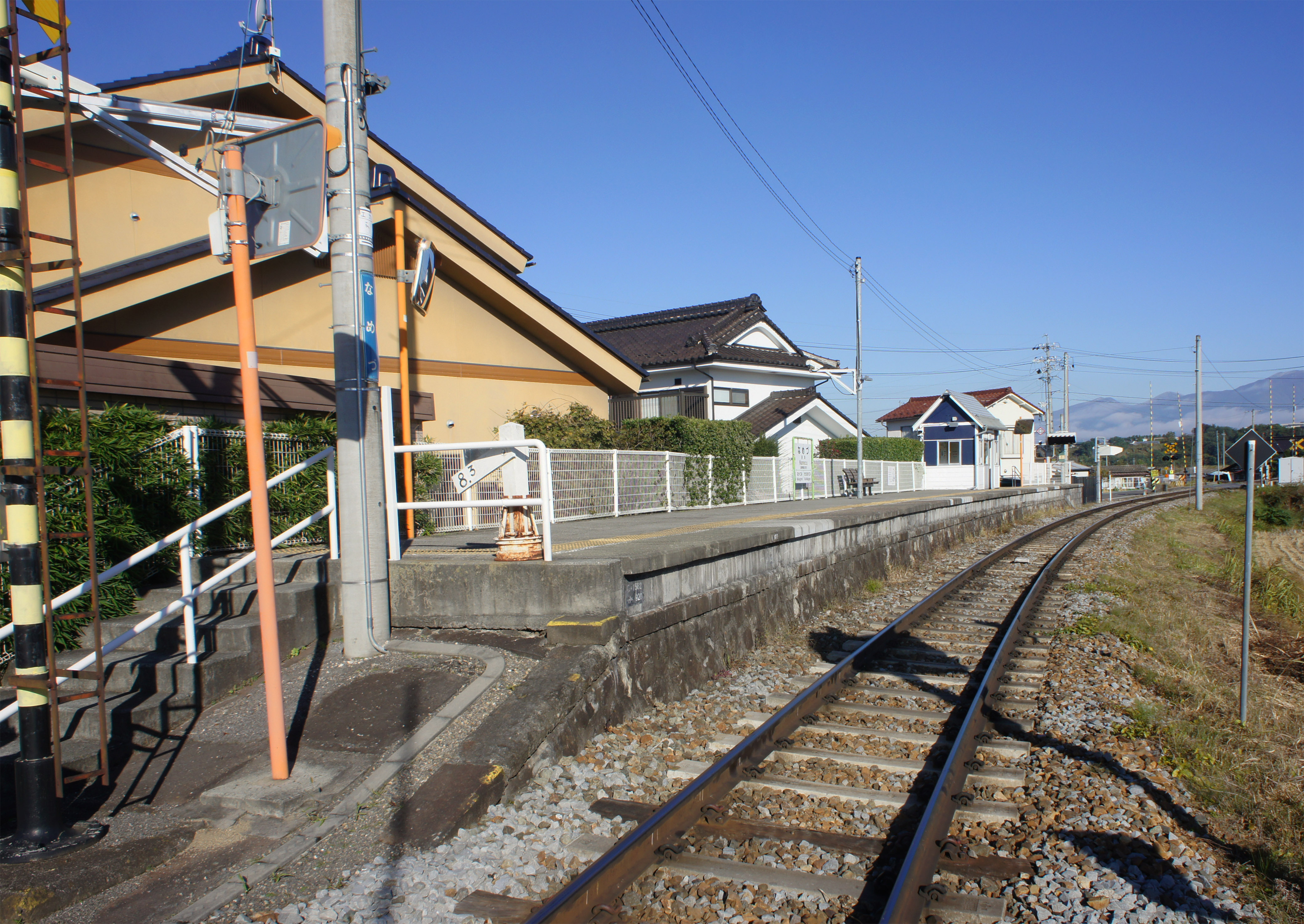
- Namezu Station, October 2021

General information
- Location: 2496 Namezu, Saku-shi, Nagano-ken 385-0051; Japan
- Coordinates: 36.2388°N 138.4751°E
- Elevation: 665.2 meters
- Operator: JR East
- Line: ■ Koumi Line
- Distance: 66.5 km from Kobuchizawa
- Platforms: 1 side platform

Other information
- Status: Unstaffed
- Website: Official website

History
- Opened: 6 June 1916

Passengers
- FY2011: 86

Services
| Preceding station | JR East | Following station |
|---|---|---|
| Kita-Nakagomi towards Komoro | Koumi Line | Nakagomi towards Kobuchizawa |
Location
- Location within Nagano Prefecture Location within Japan

Namezu Station (滑津駅, Namezu-eki) is a train station in the city of Saku, Nagano, Japan, operated by East Japan Railway Company (JR East).

== Lines ==
Namezu Station is served by the Koumi Line and is 66.5 kilometers from the terminus of the line at Kobuchizawa Station.

== Station layout ==
The station consists of one ground-level side platform serving a single bi-directional track. The platform is short, and can only accommodate trains of two carriages in length, therefore a door cut system is used. The station is unattended.

== History ==
Namezu Station opened on 6 June 1916. The station was out of operation from 1944 through 1952. With the dissolution and privatization of JNR on April 1, 1987, the station came under the control of the East Japan Railway Company (JR East).

== Surrounding area ==
- Nakagomi Middle School

== See also ==
- List of railway stations in Japan
