= Nakagomi Station =

Railway station in Saku, Nagano Prefecture, Japan

Nakagomi Station 中込駅
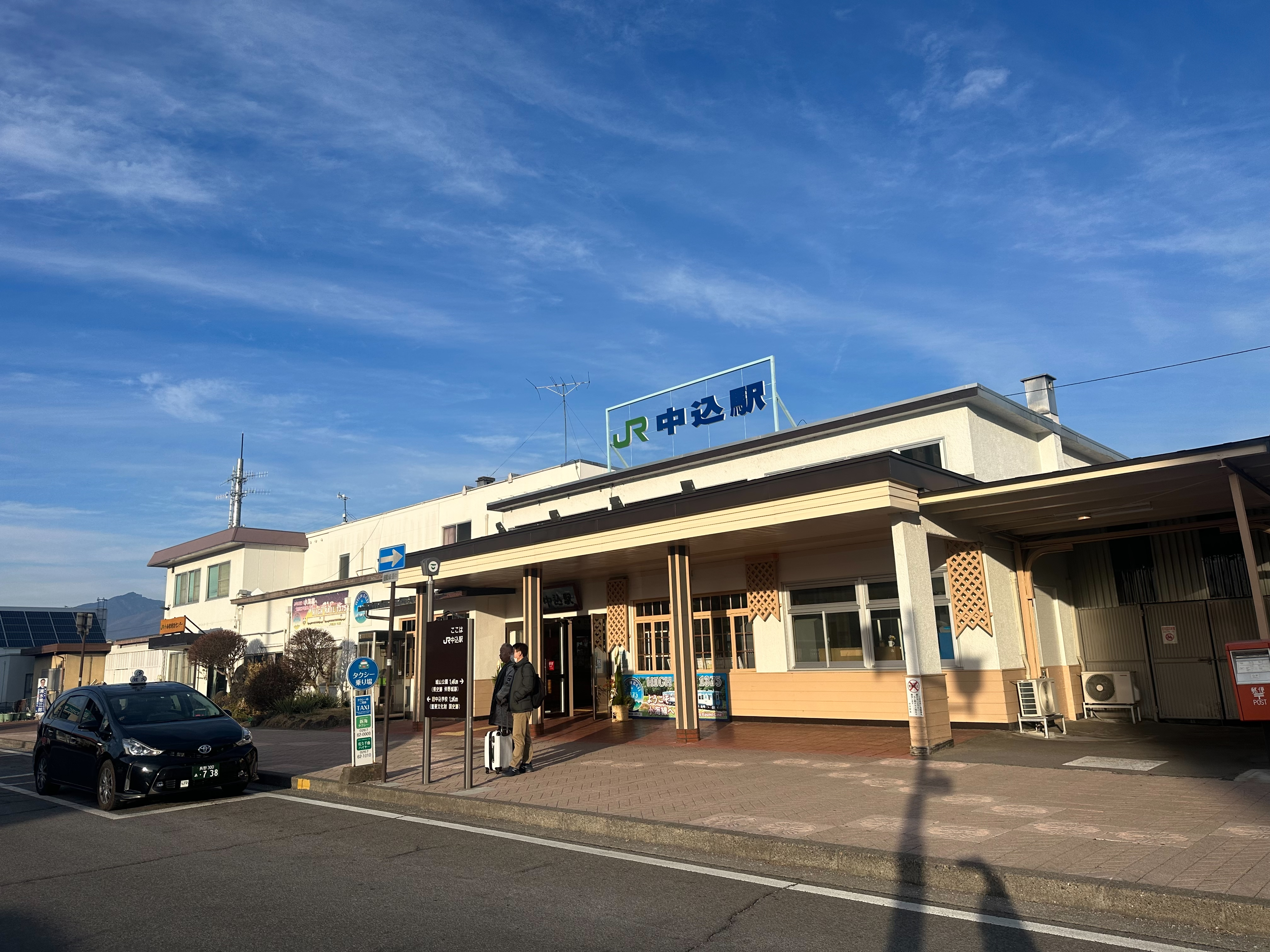
- Nakagomi Station, December 2023

General information
- Location: 2021-2 Nakagomi, Saku-shi, Nagano-ken 385-0051; Japan
- Coordinates: 36.2308°N 138.4799°E
- Elevation: 673.4 meters
- Operator: JR East
- Line: ■ Koumi Line
- Distance: 65.5 km from Kobuchizawa
- Platforms: 1 side + 1 island platform

Other information
- Status: Staffed (Midori no Madoguchi )
- Website: Official website

History
- Opened: 8 August 1915

Passengers
- FY2015: 995

Services
Preceding station	JR East	Following station
Namezu towards Komoro	Koumi Line	Ōtabe towards Kobuchizawa
Location
- Location within Nagano Prefecture Location within Japan

Nakagomi Station (中込駅, Nakagomi-eki) is a train station in the city of Saku, Nagano, Japan, operated by East Japan Railway Company (JR East).

== Lines ==
Nakagomi Station is served by the Koumi Line and is 65.5 kilometers from the terminus of the line at Kobuchizawa Station.

== Station layout ==
The station consists of one ground-level side platform and one island platform connected by a footbridge. The station has a Midori no Madoguchi staffed ticket office.

=== Platforms ===
1	■ Koumi Line	for Sakudaira and Komoro
2	■ Koumi Line	for Koumi and Kobuchizawa
3	■ Koumi Line	(siding)

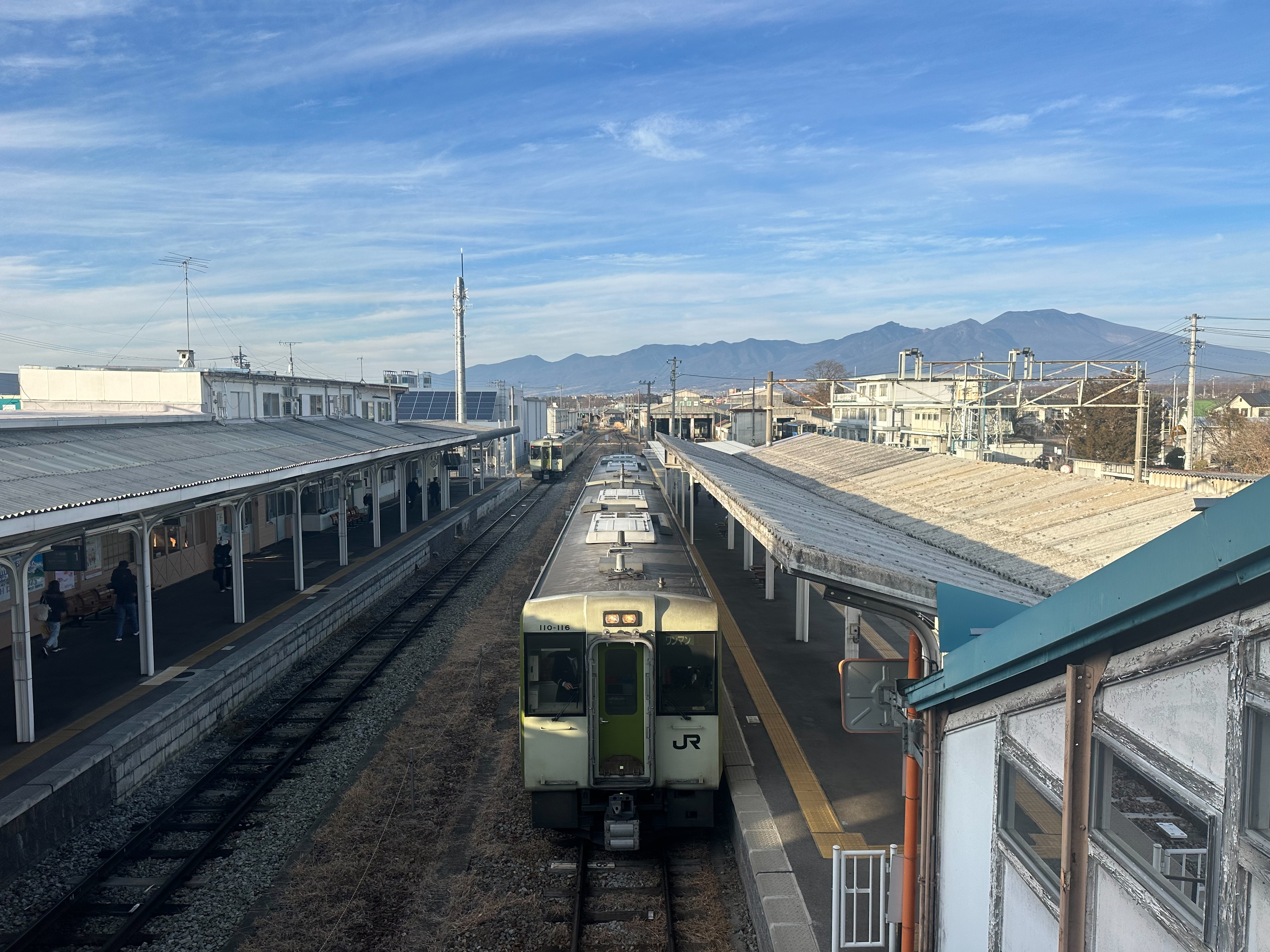
Platforms and a train, 2023

== History ==
Nakagomi Station opened on 8 August 1915. With the dissolution and privatization of JNR on April 1, 1987, the station came under the control of the East Japan Railway Company (JR East).

== Passenger statistics ==
In fiscal 2015, the station was used by an average of 995 passengers daily (boarding passengers only).

== Surrounding area ==
- Iwamurada High School
- Sakudaura General Technical School
- Saku Chosei High School
- Chikuma River
- National Route 254

== See also ==
- List of railway stations in Japan
