= Sakudaira Station =

Railway station in Saku, Nagano Prefecture, Japan

Sakudaira Station 佐久平駅
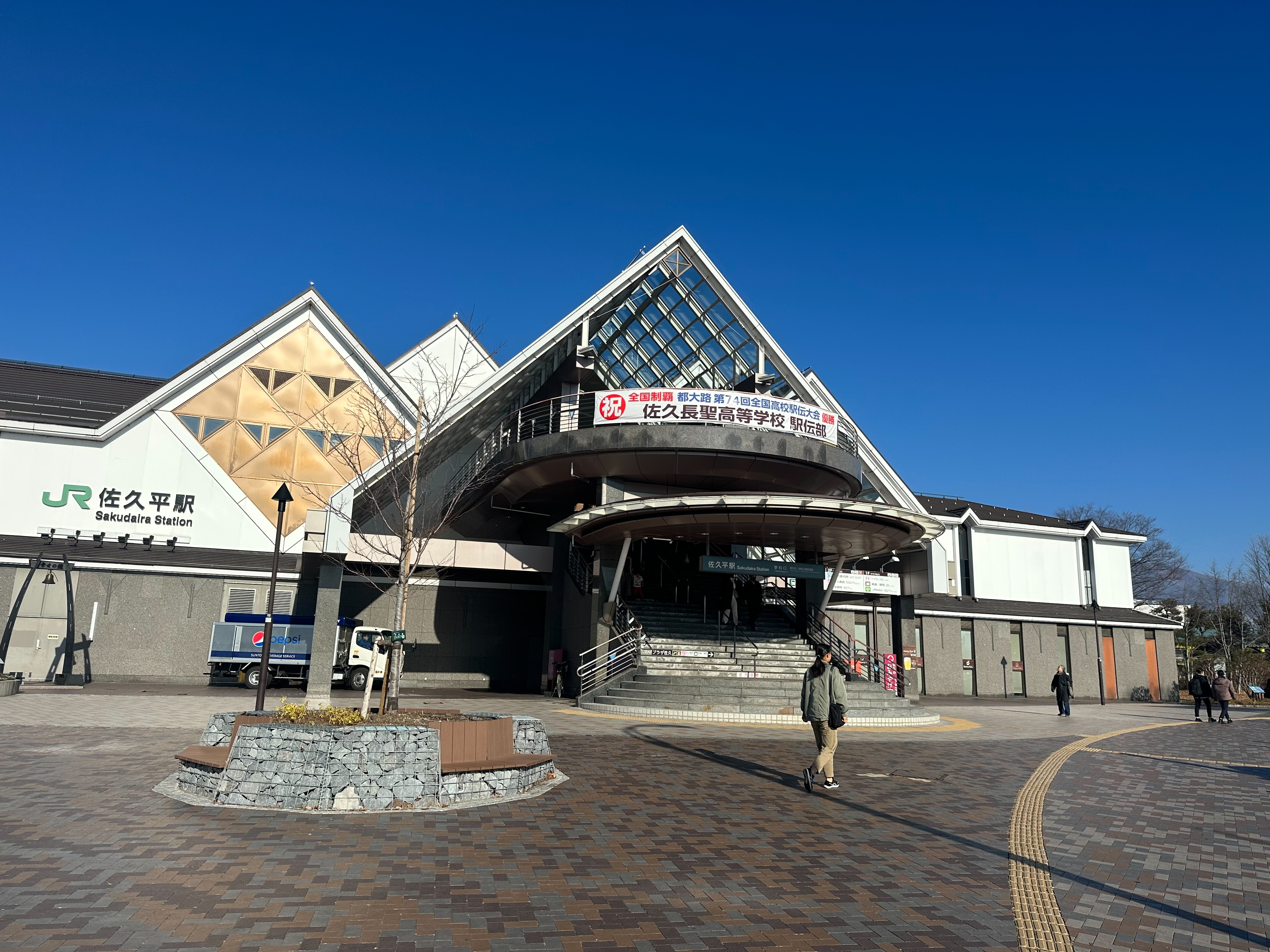
- Sakudaira Station Tateshina entrance, December 2023

General information
- Location: 1-1 Sakudaira-eki-higashi, Saku-shi, Nagano-ken 385-0028; Japan
- Coordinates: 36.277874°N 138.464341°E
- Elevation: 701 m (2,300 ft)
- Operator: JR East
- Lines: Hokuriku Shinkansen; Koumi Line
- Platforms: 3 side platforms
- Connections: Bus terminal

Other information
- Status: Staffed (Midori no Madoguchi)
- Website: Official website

History
- Opened: 1 October 1997; 28 years ago

Passengers
- FY2015: 2,937 daily

Services
Preceding station	JR East	Following station
Ueda towards Jōetsumyōkō	Hokuriku Shinkansen Hakutaka	Karuizawa towards Tokyo
Ueda towards Nagano	Hokuriku Shinkansen Asama	Karuizawa towards Tokyo
Nakasato towards Komoro	Koumi Line	Iwamurada towards Kobuchizawa
Location
- Location within Japan

Sakudaira Station (佐久平駅, Sakudaira-eki) is a railway station in Saku, Nagano, Japan, operated by the East Japan Railway Company (JR East).

== Lines ==
Sakudaira Station is served by the JR East Hokuriku Shinkansen high-speed line (formerly named the Nagano Shinkansen) from Tokyo to Kanazawa via Nagano, with direct Asama services to and from Tokyo and Nagano, and a small number of limited-stop Hakutaka services to and from Tokyo and Kanazawa. On the Shinkansen line, it is located 164.4 kilometers from Tokyo Station. It is also a stop on the local service Koumi Line and is located 71.5 kilometers from the starting point of that line at Kobuchizawa Station.

== Station layout ==
The station has two opposed side platforms serving two tracks of the Hokuriku Shinkansen, with an elevated station building. There is also a single elevated unnumbered side platform served by the single bidirectional track of the Koumi Line, which cuts diagonally above the Shinkansen platforms, and which is connected to the station building by a passageway. The station has a Midori no Madoguchi staffed ticket office.

=== Platforms ===
1	■ Hokuriku Shinkansen	for Takasaki, Ōmiya, and Tokyo
2	■ Hokuriku Shinkansen	for Ueda and Nagano
	■ Koumi Line	for Kobuchizawa, Koumi, and Komoro

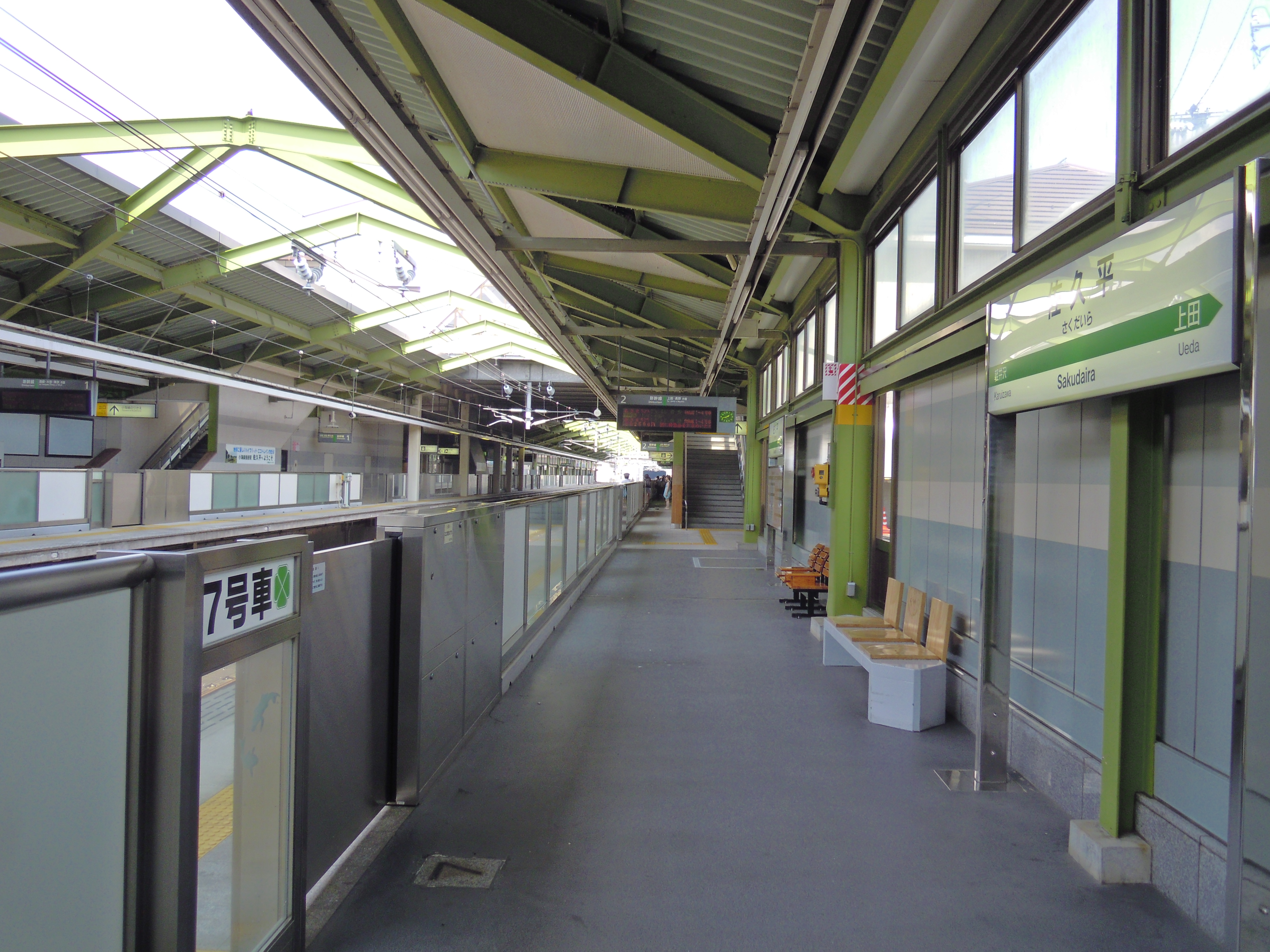
Shinkansen platform 2, July 2012

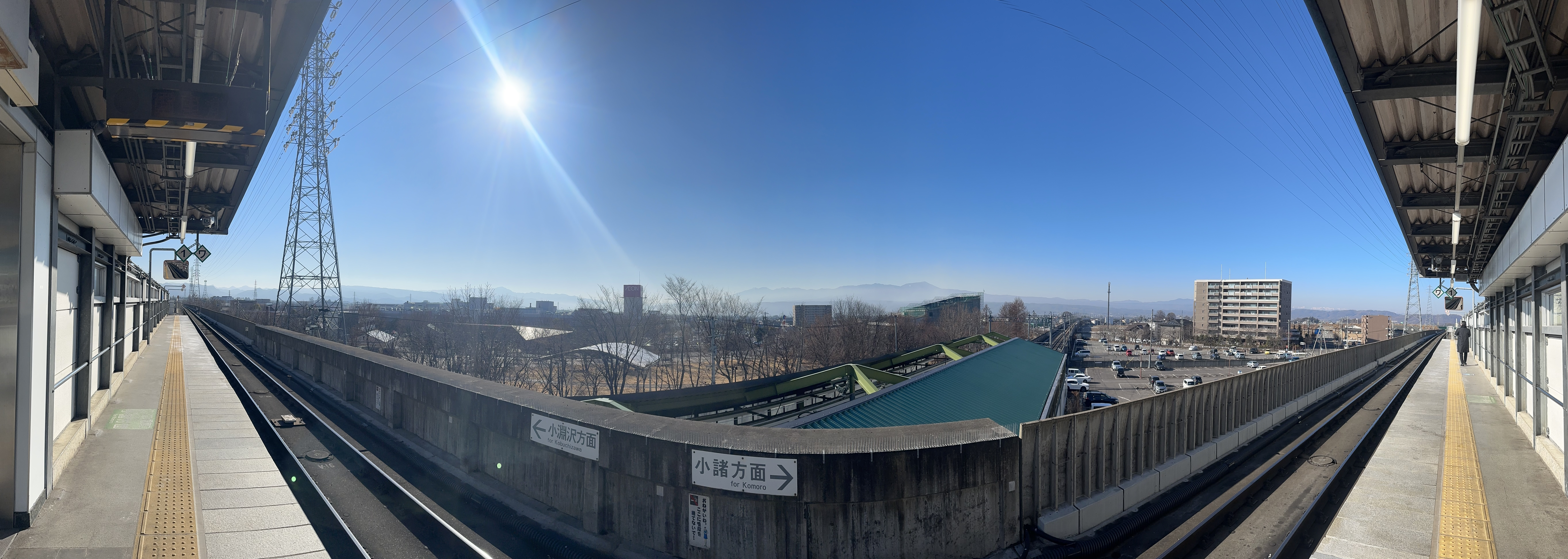
Panorama view of the Koumi Line platform, December 2023

== History ==
The station opened on October 1, 1997, coinciding with the opening of the Nagano Shinkansen.

== Passenger statistics ==
In fiscal 2015, the station was used by an average of 2,937 passengers daily (boarding passengers only).

== Surrounding area ==
- National Route 141
- Saku Chosei Junior & Senior High School
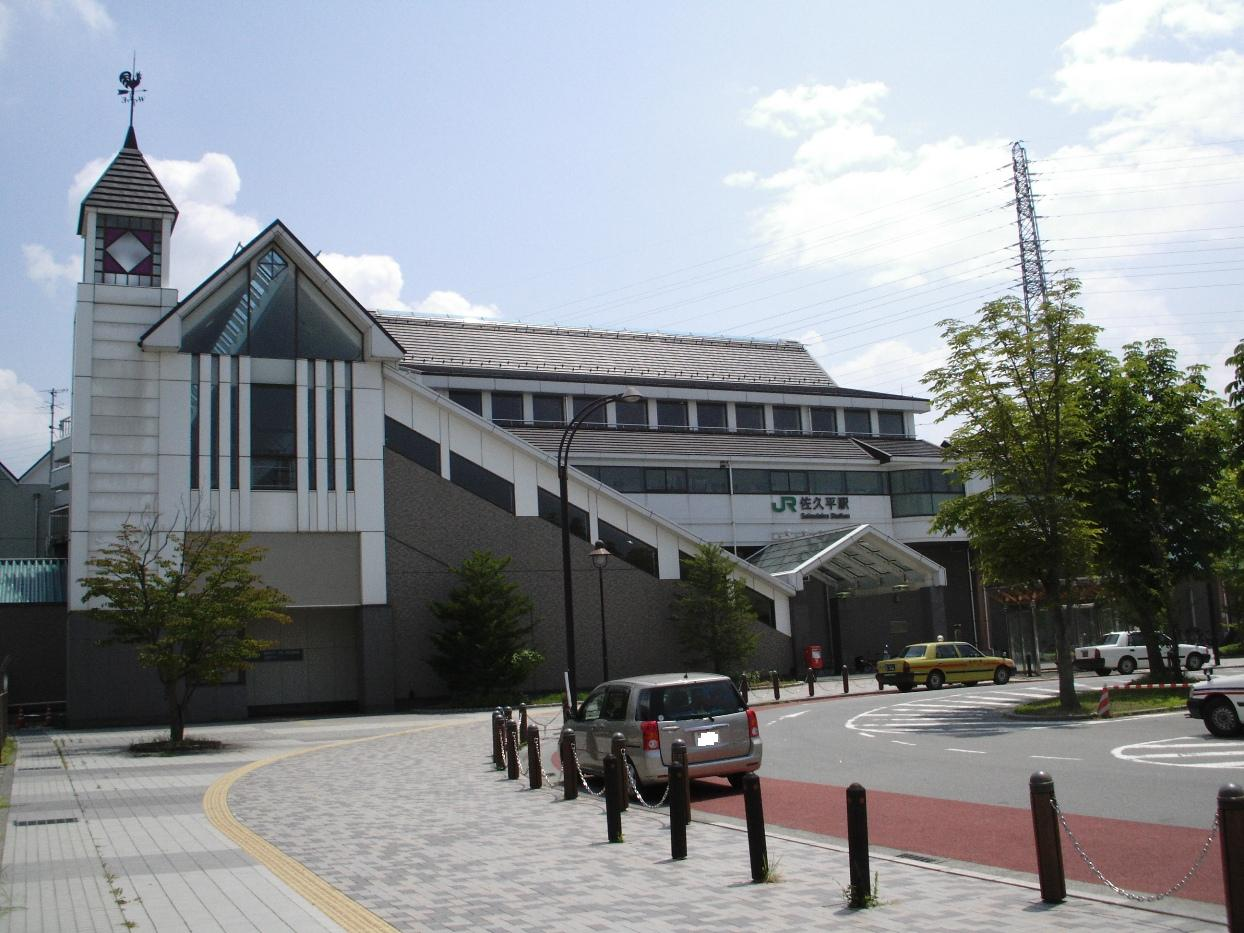
Asama entrance, July 2007

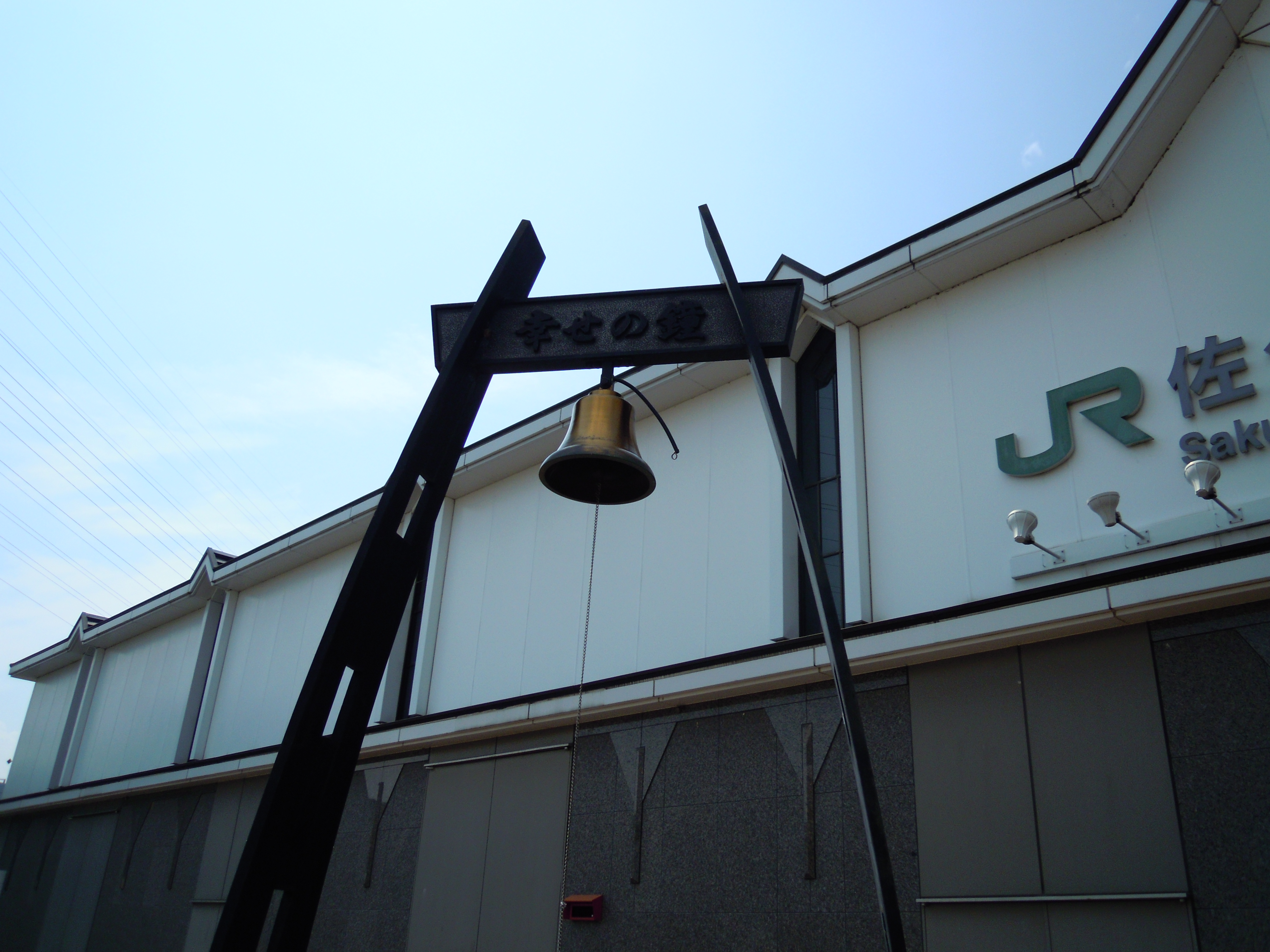
"Shiawase no Kane" ("Bell of happiness"), beside the Tateshina entrance, July 2012

== See also ==
- List of railway stations in Japan
