= Nagano (city) =

Nagano 長野市
- Prefecture capital and Core city
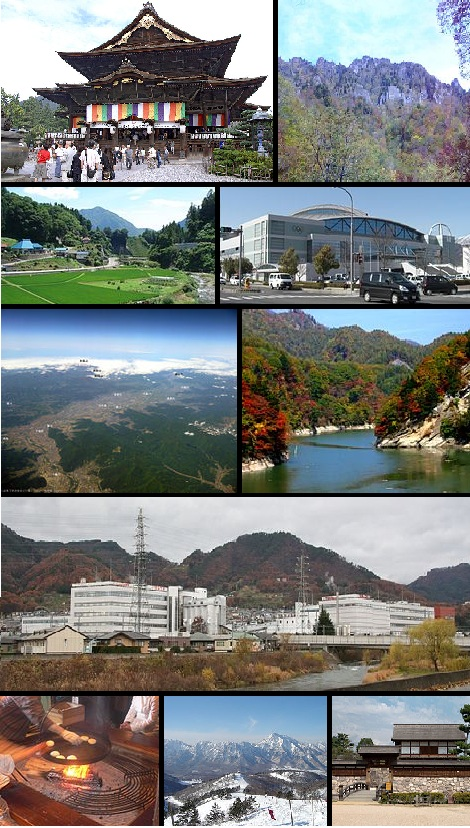
- From top of left, Zenkoji, Mount Togakushi, Kinasa village, Nagano Big Hat arena, Aerial in Kawanakajima, Susobana Valley, headquarters of Marukome (famous miso manufacturing company) in Nagano, Oyaki Japanese sweets a.k.a. Imagawayaki, Togakushi ski resort, and Matsushiro Castle

- Flag Symbol
- Location of Nagano in Nagano Prefecture

- Coordinates: 36°38′55″N 138°11′41″E
- Country: Japan
- Region: Chūbu (Kōshin'etsu)
- Prefecture: Nagano

Government
  - Mayor: Kenji Ogiwara

Area
  - Total: 834.81 km^{2} (322.32 sq mi)

Population (July 1, 2023)
  - Total: 365,296
  - Density: 437.58/km^{2} (1,133.3/sq mi)
- Time zone: UTC+9 (Japan Standard Time)
- Phone number: 026-226-4911
- Address: 1613 Midori-chō, Nagano-shi, Nagano-ken 380-8512
- Climate: Cfa/Dfa
- Website: Official website
- Symbols
- Flower: Apple
- Tree: Japanese Lime (Tilia japonica)

Nagano (長野市, Nagano-shi; Japanese pronunciation: [nä́.ɡä̀.nò̞, -ŋä̀.nò̞, nä̀.ɡä́.nó̞.ɕì, -ŋä́.nó̞-], locally [nä̀.ŋä́.nó̞]) is the capital and largest city of Nagano Prefecture, located in the Nagano Basin (Zenkoji Daira) in the central Chūbu region of Japan. Nagano is categorized as a core city of Japan. Nagano City is the highest prefectural capital in Japan, with an altitude of 371.4 meters (1,219 ft).

The city is surrounded by mountains, the highest of which is Mount Takatsuma (2,353 m), and it is near the confluence of the Chikuma River — the longest and widest river in Japan — and the Sai River. As of 1 July 2023, the city had an estimated population of 365,296 in 160,625 households, and a population density of 438 persons per km^{2}. The total area of the city is 834.81 square kilometres (322.32 sq mi).

== Overview ==
Nagano City, located in the former Shinano Province, developed in the Nara period (AD 710 to 794) as a temple town (monzen machi). The city of Nagano is home to Zenkō-ji, a 7th-century Buddhist temple that is listed as a Japanese National Treasure. Zenkō-ji was established at its current location in 642 AD. The location of Zenkō-ji is approximately two kilometers from the present-day central Nagano Station.

Between 1553 and 1564, during the Sengoku Period, the Age of Warring States, Nagano was the site of a series of conflicts known as the Battles of Kawanakajima. During the Edo period (1603 and 1868), as the city developed, Nagano became an important post station (shukuba) on the Hokkoku Kaidō highway which connected Edo (present day Tokyo) with the coast of the Sea of Japan. Following the Meiji restoration, Nagano became the first established modern town in Nagano prefecture, on April 1, 1897.

The city of Nagano and several surrounding communities hosted the 1998 Winter Olympics and the 1998 Winter Paralympics. Nagano City is an important historical location and an industrial center, as well as a travel destination and a hub for accessing surrounding sightseeing spots, including Japan's onsen-bathing, the snow monkeys in Yamanouchi, and the world-class ski resorts of Hakuba, Shiga Kogen and Nozawaonsen.

=== 1998 Winter Olympics and Paralympics ===
Nagano, along with the neighboring communities of Hakuba village, Nozawaonsen, Yamanouchi, Iizuna, and Karuizawa hosted the 1998 Winter Olympics from February 7 to February 22 and the Paralympics from March 5 to March 14. This was the third Olympic Games and second Winter Olympic Games to be held in Japan, after the 1964 Summer Olympics in Tokyo, and the 1972 Winter Olympics in Sapporo (the first Winter Games ever held in Asia). As of 2019, Nagano was the southernmost host of the Winter Olympic Games. The Nagano Olympic Commemorative Marathon is held annually to commemorate the occasion.

One important legacy of the Games was an improved transportation network. In order to facilitate access to Nagano in advance of the Games, the city was linked to the high-speed shinkansen train network. The Nagano Shinkansen (now the Hokuriku Shinkansen) was inaugurated five months before the start of the Games and carried 655,000 passengers during the Winter Olympics. In addition, both Nagano Station and Shinonoi Station were expanded, and Imai Station, in the Kawanakajima area, was built to give access to the Athletes village.

The Nagano Expressway and the Jōshin-etsu Expressway were built in the Nagano region, and another 114.9 kilometers of roads within Nagano Prefecture were improved.

In addition to a transport legacy, several world-class venues of the 1998 Winter Olympics were built, including M-Wave, Japan's first International Skating Union (ISU) standard indoor 400m double-track, which happens to be one of the largest hanging wooden-roof structures in the world. The Athletes Village, beside the newly constructed Imai Station, was built in advance of the Games by the city of Nagano as future public residential housing, and loaned to the Nagano Olympic Organizing Committee during the Games. A Media Village, composed of a four-block 10-12 storey apartment complex named Asahi Danchi, was built in the Asahi district of Nagano, across the street from the M-Wave. Asahi Danchi now includes private sector housing as well as housing for government employees.

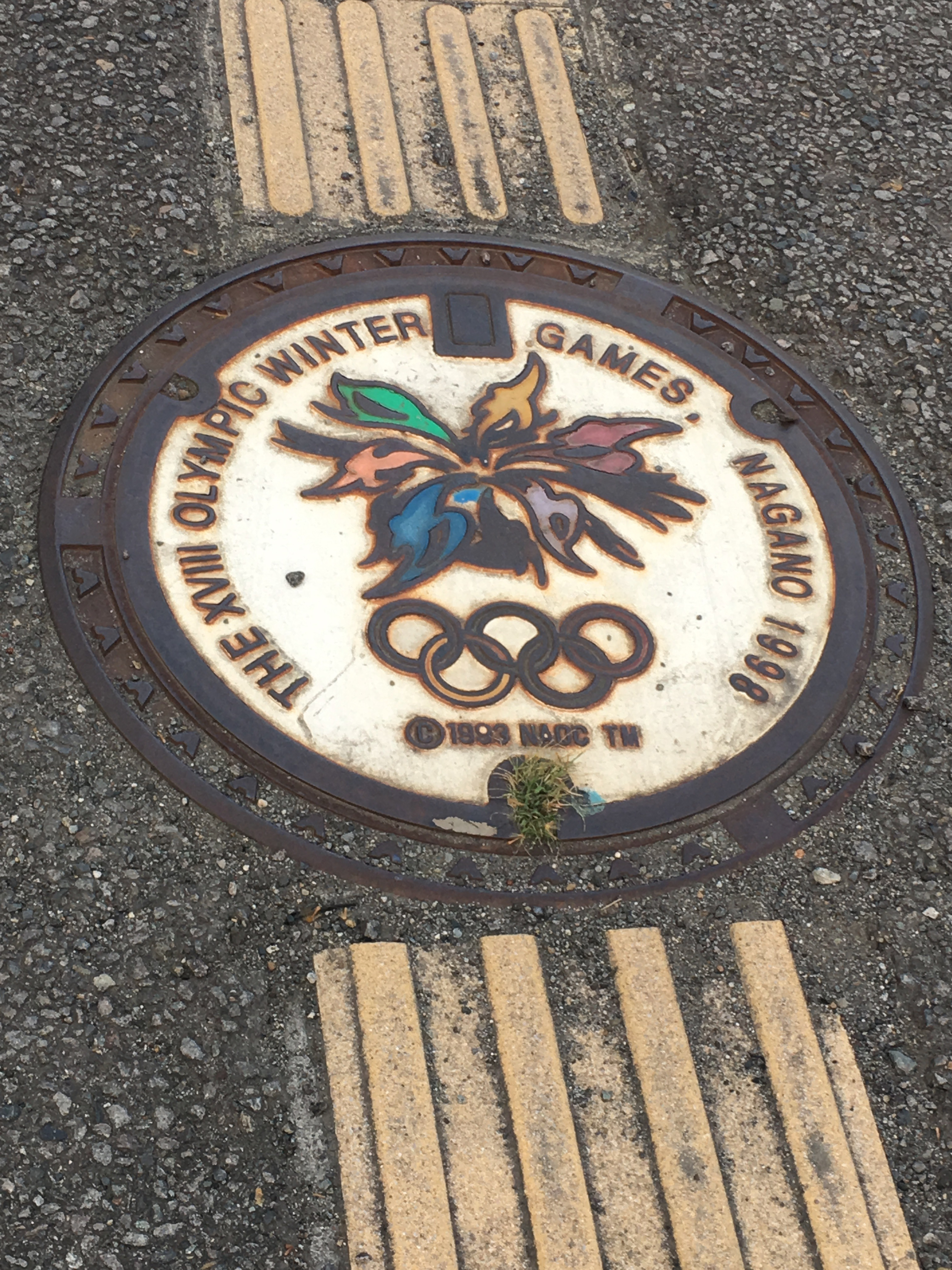
Stylized manhole cover displaying the Nagano Olympics emblem, with tactile paving

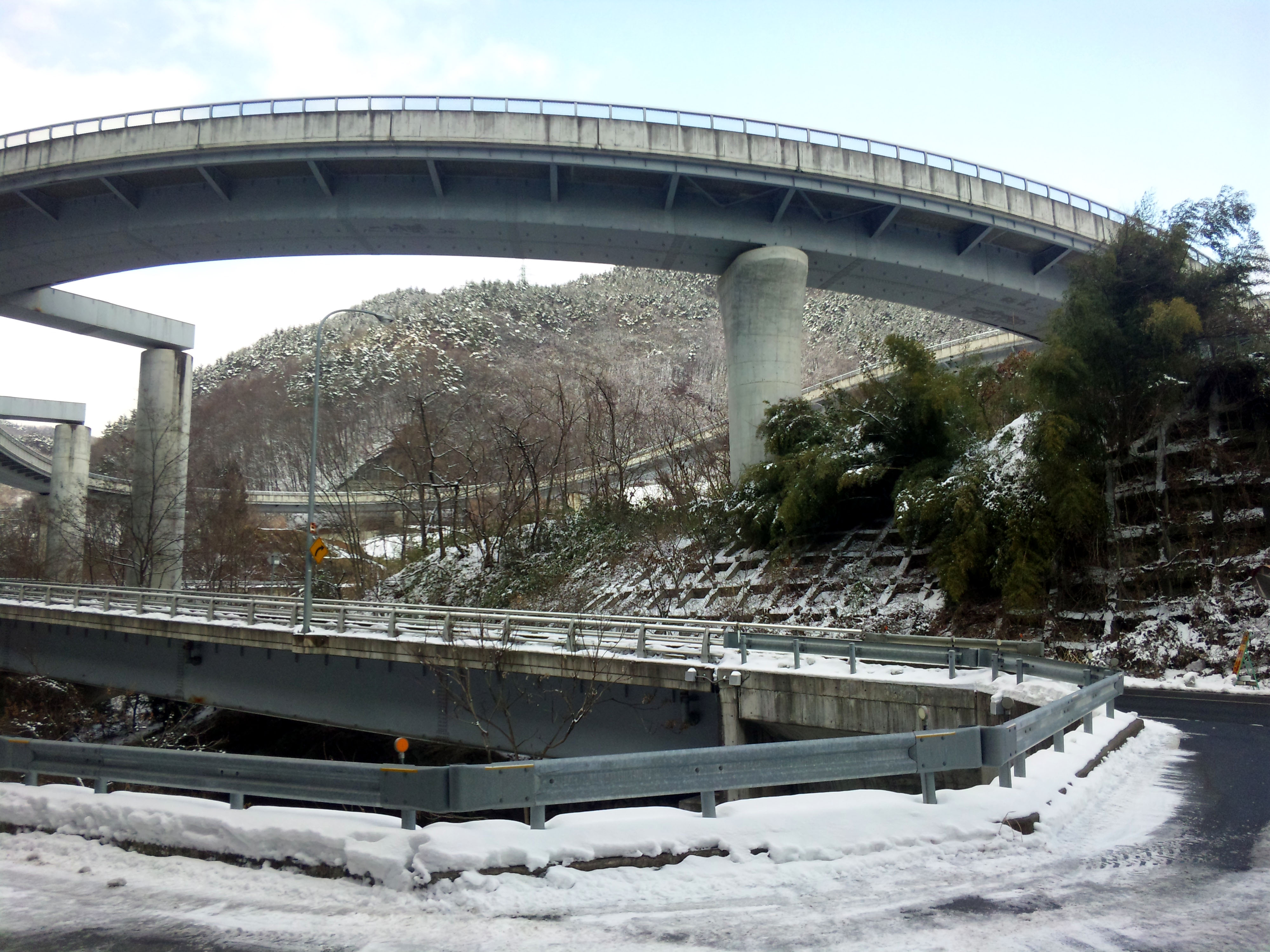
Asagawa Loop Line to Iizuna Kogen Ski Area built in preparations for the 1998 Winter Olympics

=== Cityscapes ===
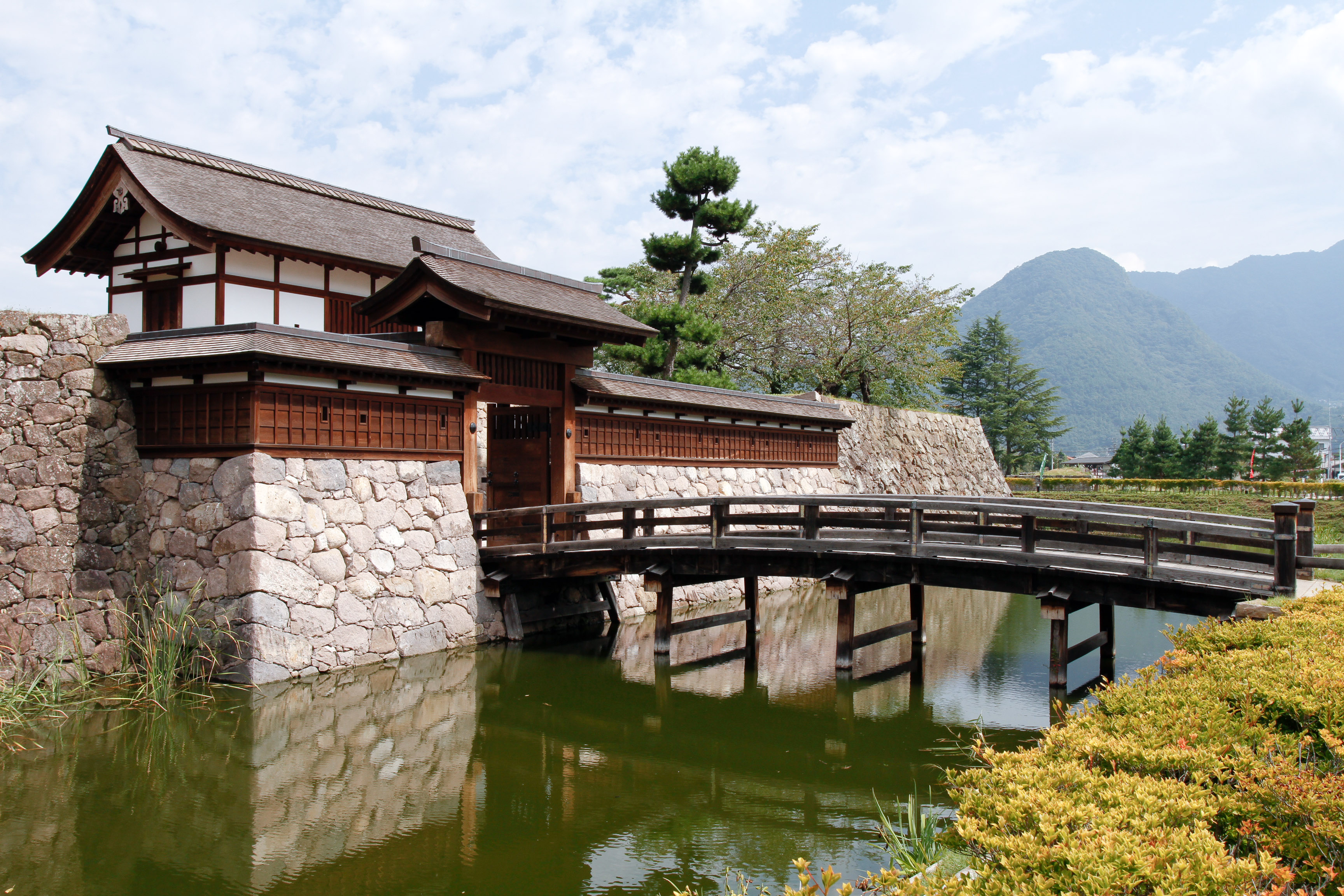
Matsushiro Castle (2010)

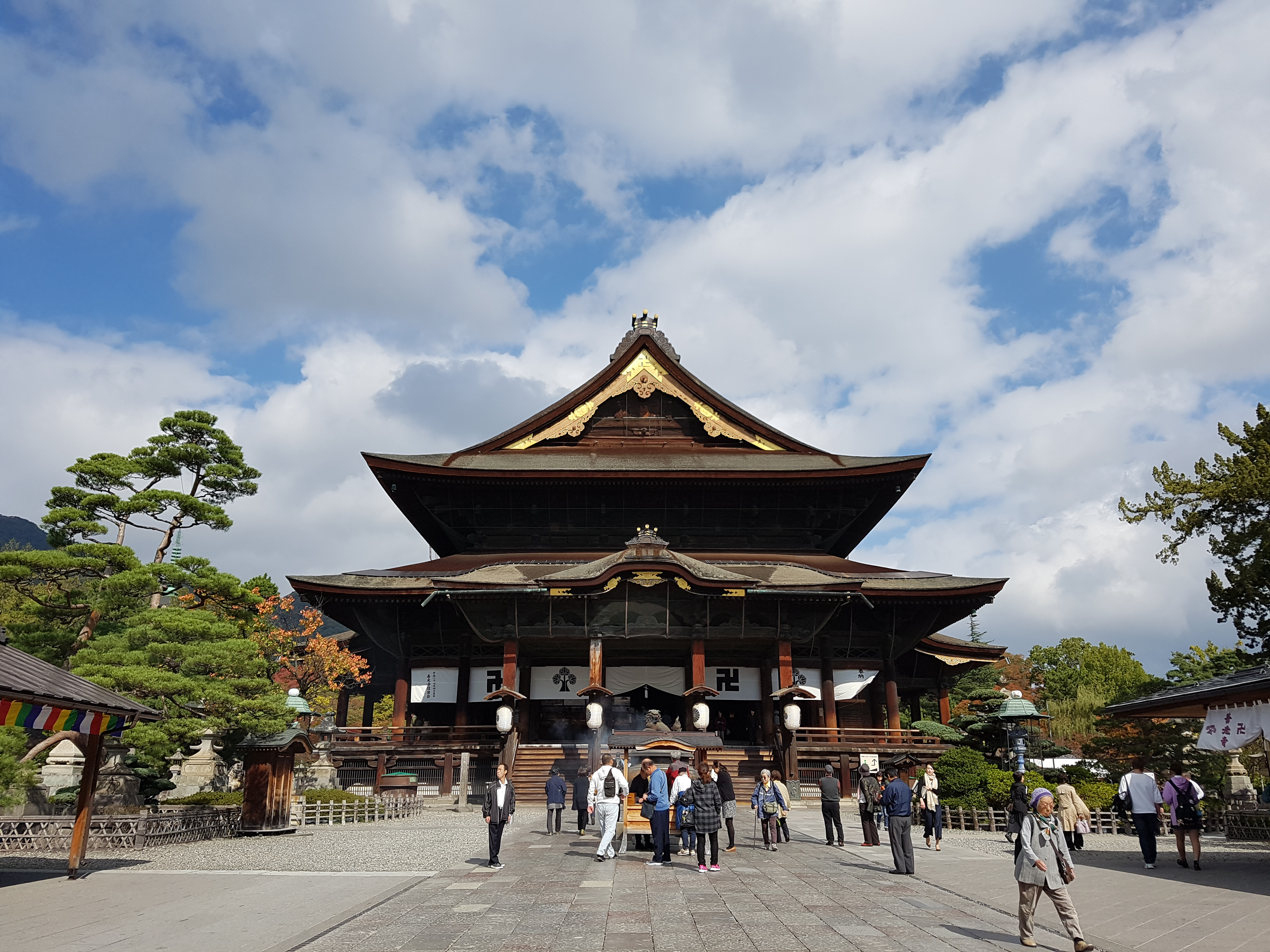
Zenkō-ji (2018)

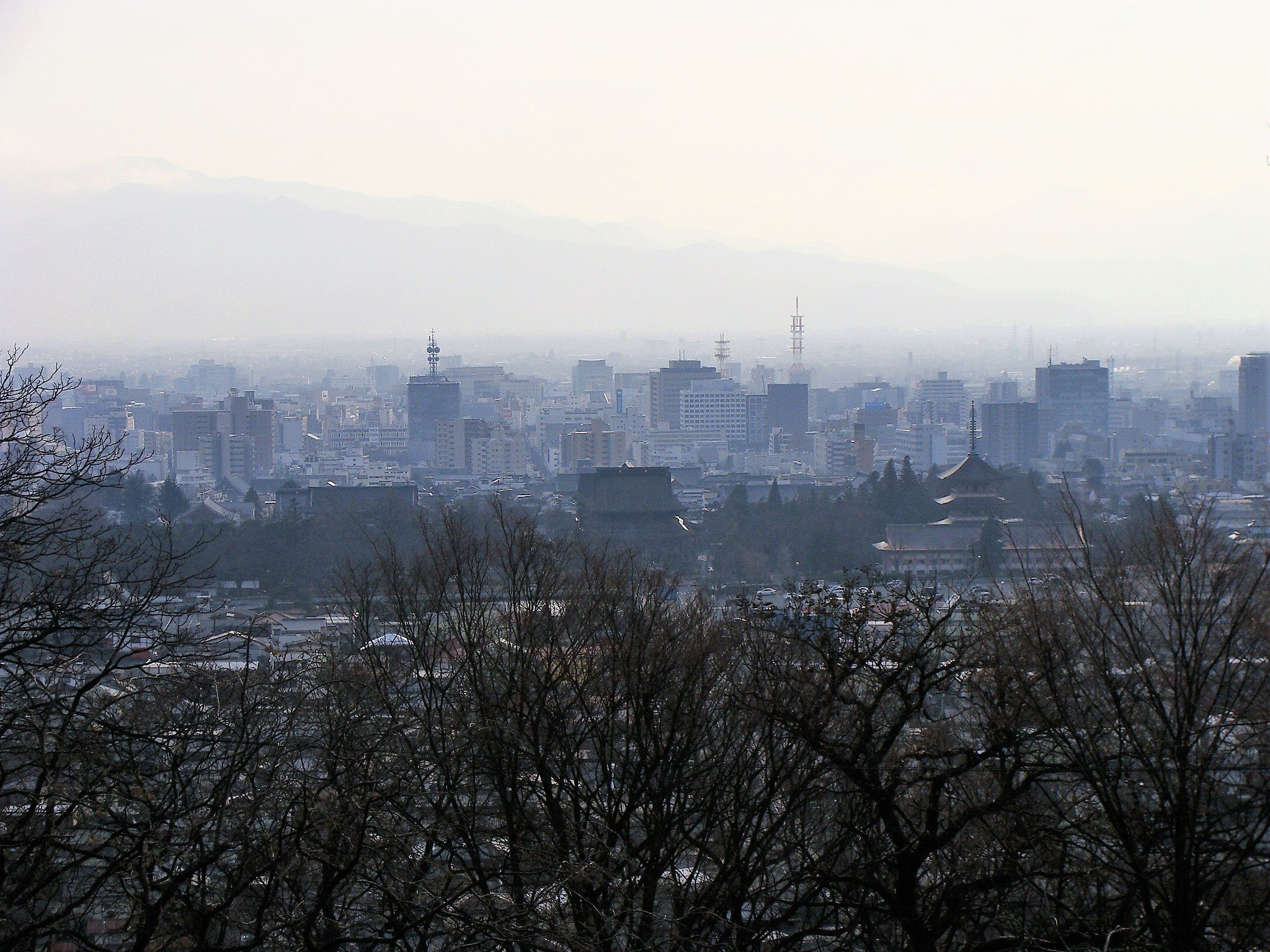
Skyline of Nagano City (2019)

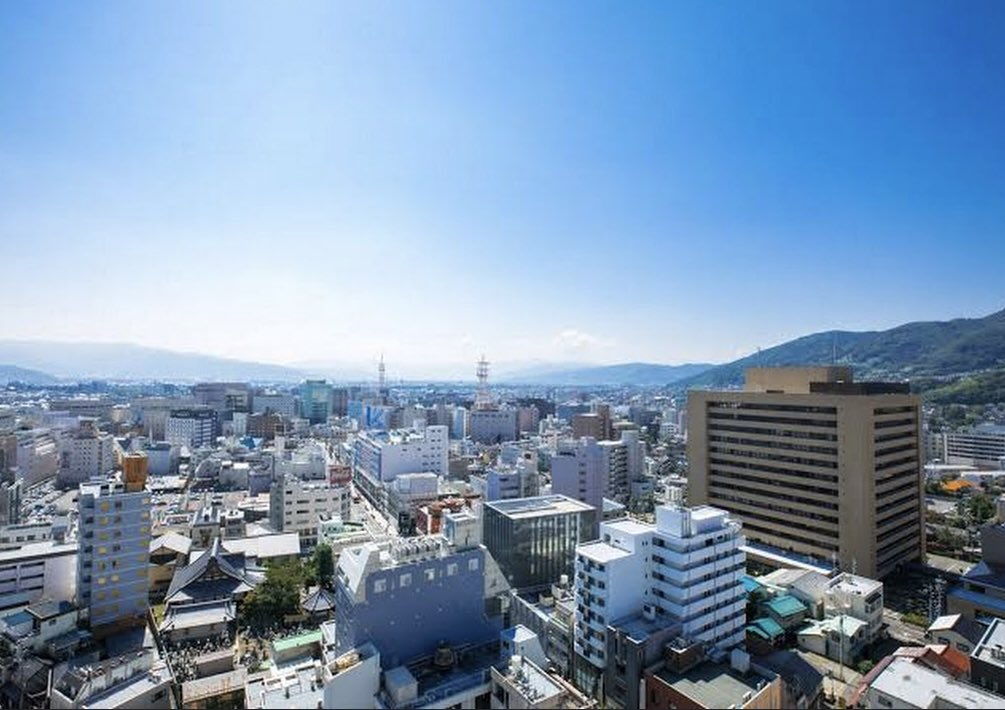
CBD of Nagano (2022)

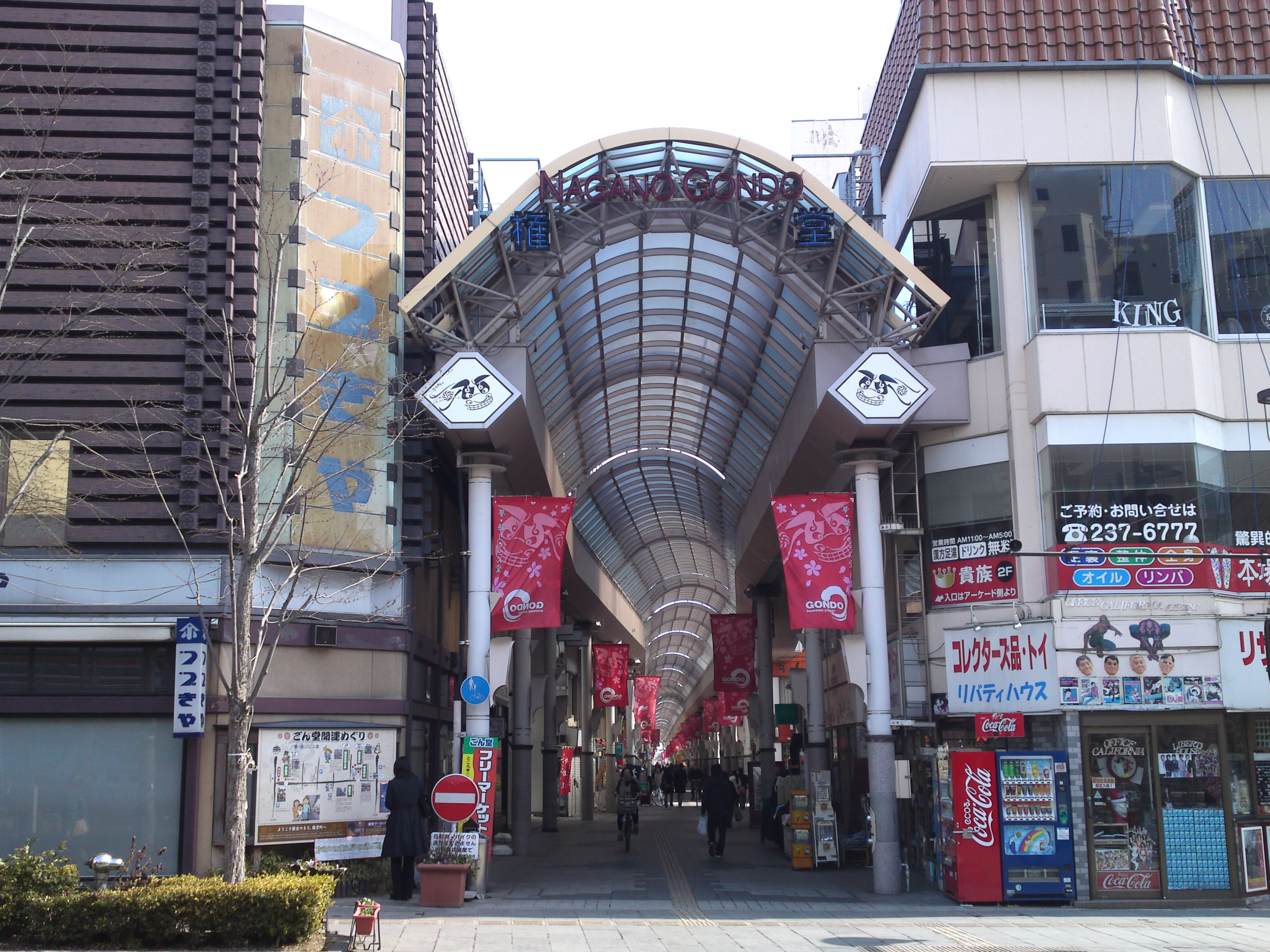
Downtown Gondō (2011)

== Geography ==
Nagano is located in north-central Nagano Prefecture, in the Nagano Basin (Zenkoji Daira), surrounded by mountains, near the confluence of the Chikuma River and the Sai River. The Sai River in Nagano should not be confused with the Sai River (Gifu) even though both rivers have the same kanji and reading, 犀川 (Saigawa). Other important rivers include the Susobana River, which originates in the Togakushi highland area, and the Torii River, which also originates in the Togakushi highlands. The Chikuma River is 367.0 km long, 29.5 km of which are within the Nagano city limits. The Sai River is 157.7 km long, with 44.2 km in Nagano. All 40.1 km of the Susobana River are in Nagano City, and 10.4 km of the 34.8 km-long Torii River are in Nagano Myōkō-Togakushi Renzan National Park, Jōshin'etsu-kōgen National Park and Chūbu-Sangaku National Park are each partially located within Nagano City.

The present-day core city of Nagano includes the districts and former towns of Nagano, Shinonoi, Matsushiro, Wakaho, Kawanakajima, Kohoku, Naniai, Shinkomachi, Toyono, Togakushi, Kinasa, Ooka, Shinshushincho, Nakajo.

=== Surrounding mountains ===
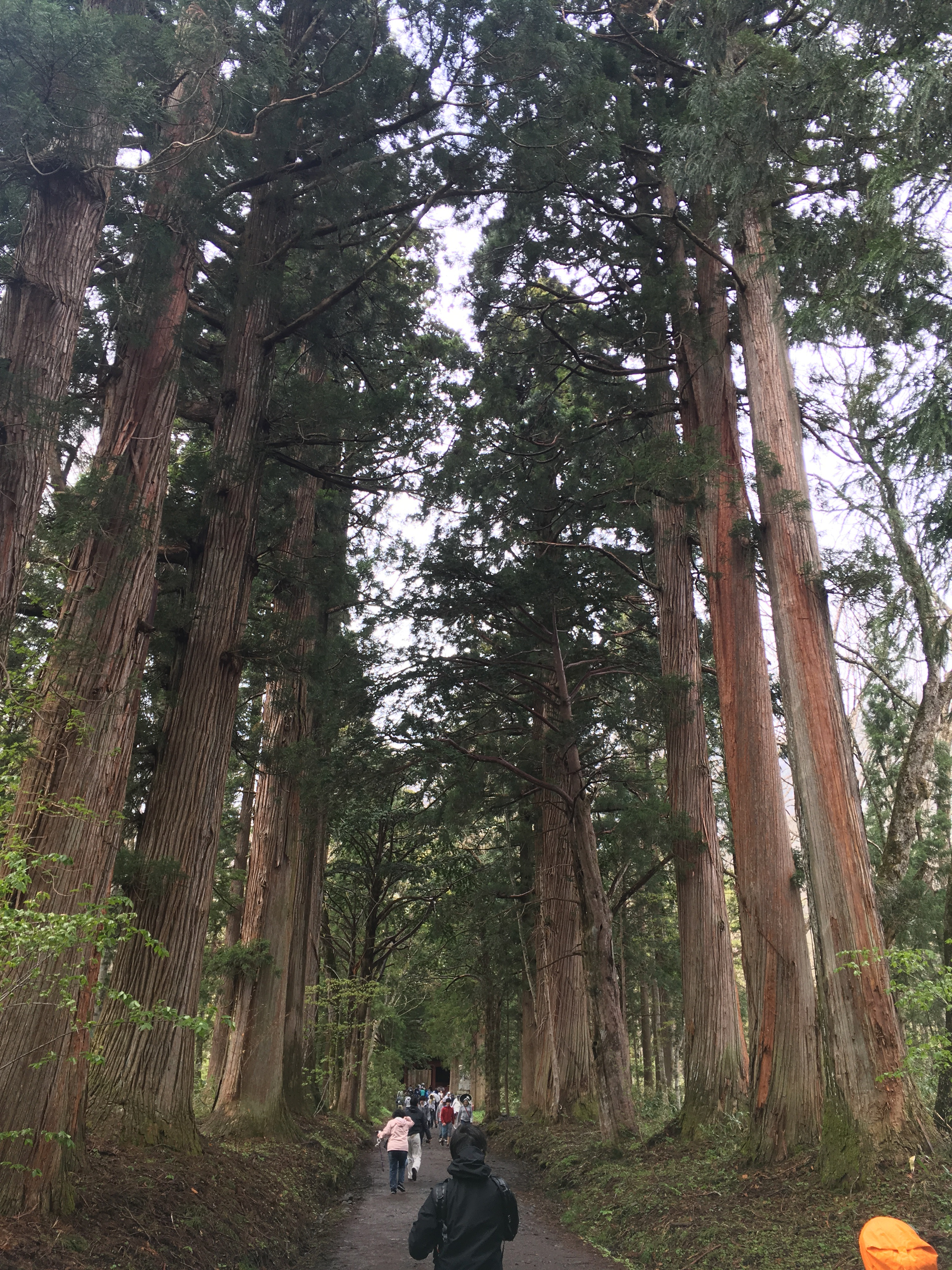
Along the route on Mt. Togakushi, Nagano, to Oku Shrine

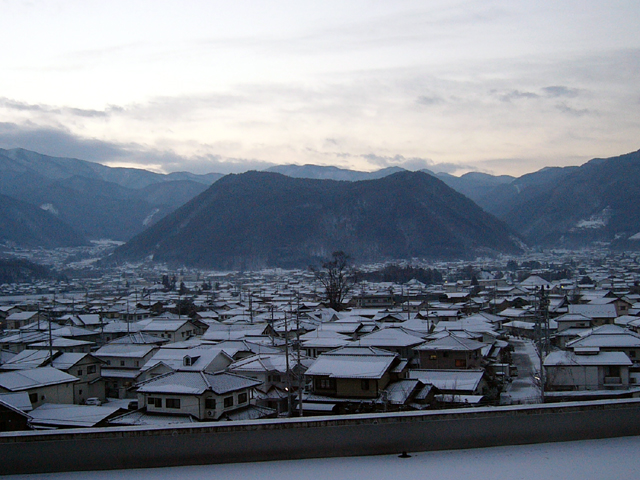
Mount Minakami

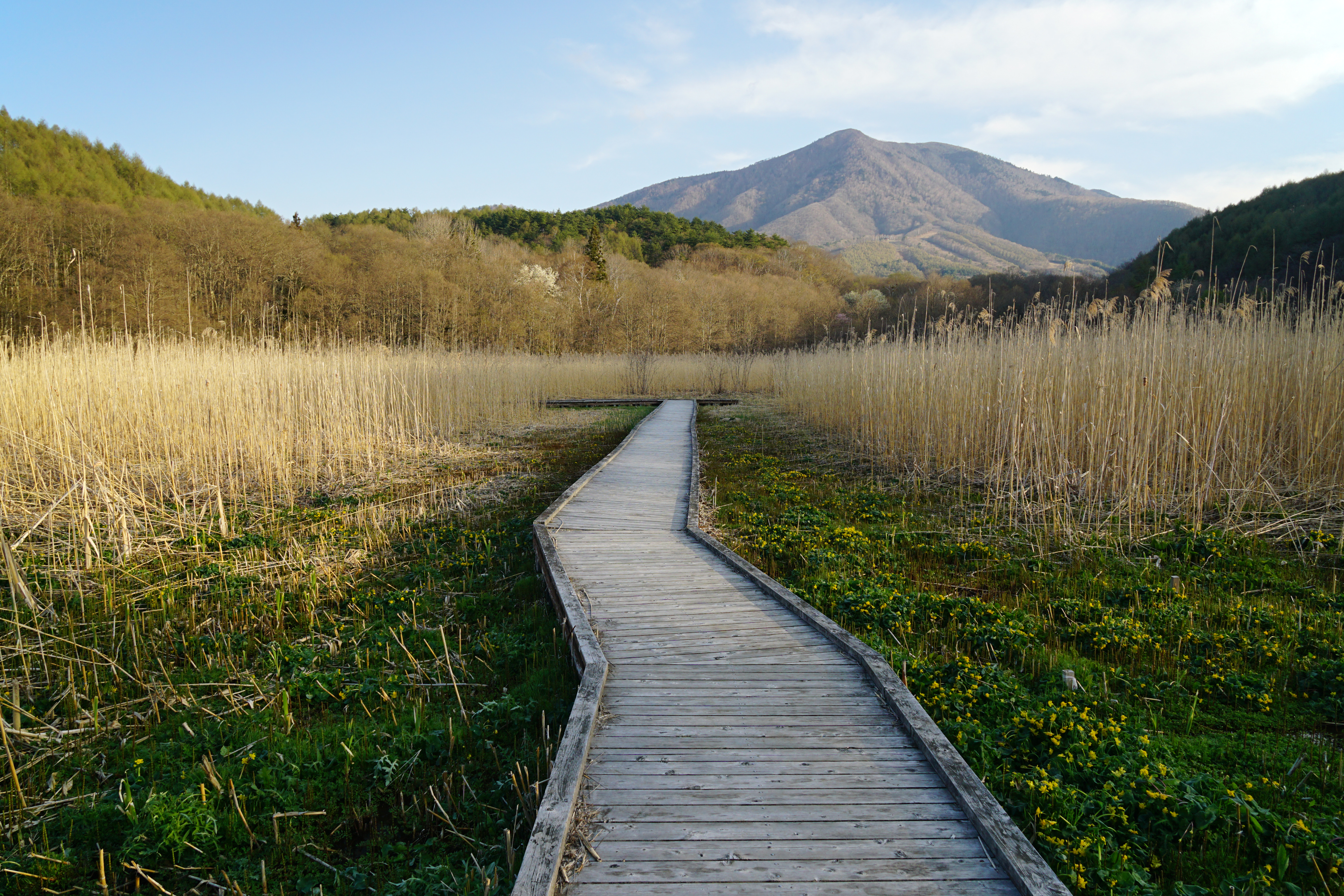
Iizuna Highlands

- Mount Takatsuma, 2,353 m, straddles Myōkō, Niigata and Nagano City. It is the highest peak of the Togakushi mountain range, is one of the 100 Famous Japanese Mountains, and due to its pyramidal shape it is also known as Togakushi Fuji. Takatsuma is the highest point in Nagano City. The lowest point is located in the Asano area of Toyono, 327.4 meters above sea level.
- Mount Iizuna, 1,917 meters, is a popular area for skiing and is where the Spiral, bobsleigh and luge track for the 1998 Winter Olympics are located.
- Mount Togakushi, 1,904 m, is located in Nagano City.
- Mount Hijiri, 1,447 m. is located along the border between Nagano City, and Omi in Higashichikuma District, Nagano.
- Daibou Pass, 1,055 m, is located in Nagano City, on the border of Togakushi and Kinasa, Nagano.
- Iizuna Kogen, 1,000 m, is a highland area that extends to the south base of Mount Iizuna in Nagano City.
- Mount Mododori, 744 m, spans northern Nagano City, and Iizuna town. It is a monogenetic volcano that was active approximately 200,000 years ago.
- Mount Dizuki, 733 m, is located on the northwest side of Nagano City.
- Mount Minakami, 659 m, is a lava dome in Matsushiro in Nagano City. Its relative height to the surrounding landscape is 280 m.

=== Demographics ===
The population of Nagano City has declined by 10,000 since the mid-1990s. As of April 1, 2019, the city had a total population of 376,080 people, made up of 193,982 women and 182,098 men in 160,625 households.

==== Historical populations ====
Historical population
Year	Pop.	±%
1920	212,182	—
1925	222,141	+4.7%
1930	234,503	+5.6%
1935	239,513	+2.1%
1940	241,716	+0.9%
1945	295,090	+22.1%
1950	300,756	+1.9%
1955	303,435	+0.9%
1960	303,458	+0.0%
1965	310,399	+2.3%
1970	322,825	+4.0%
1975	342,120	+6.0%
1980	358,173	+4.7%
1985	369,023	+3.0%
1990	377,261	+2.2%
1995	387,359	+2.7%
2000	387,911	+0.1%
2005	386,572	−0.3%
2010	381,511	−1.3%
2015	377,598	−1.0%
2020	372,760	−1.3%

==== Population of districts of the current Core City of Nagano ====
The growth and decline of the population within the various districts of Nagano City has been uneven over the past 70 years.

Sortable table
Year	Total	Nagano	Shinonoi	Matsushiro	Wakaho	Kawanakajima	Kohoku	Naniai	Shinkomachi	Toyono	Togakushi	Kinasa	Ooka	Shinshushincho	Nakajo
1947	295,348	136,353	30,318	27,906	13,242	11,053	12,783	4,891	6,500	9,930	10,205	6,170	4,670	14,240	7,087
1950	300,756	143,494	30,068	27,131	13,063	10,794	12,807	4,911	6,385	9,869	10,281	6,209	4,560	14,040	7,144
1955	303,684	152,547	29,062	25,485	12,312	10,432	12,655	4,870	6,067	9,787	9,697	6,007	4,351	13,511	6,901
1960	303,458	160,522	29,329	22,626	11,938	10,403	12,331	4,419	5,503	9,604	8,709	5,373	4,035	12,354	6,312
1965	310,399	172,836	29,304	21,451	11,404	10,975	14,228	3,962	4,964	9,110	7,547	4,397	3,405	11,324	5,456
1970	322,825	187,216	30,633	20,496	11,739	12,551	14,630	3,571	4,519	9,283	6,475	3,763	2,924	10,188	4,837
1975	342,120	198,224	34,493	19,968	12,317	16,102	18,140	3,190	4,203	9,539	6,225	3,603	2,477	9,323	4,316
1980	358,173	208,703	36,432	20,786	12,766	17,314	21,321	2,995	4,043	9,633	6,074	3,223	2,249	8,616	4,018
1985	369,023	216,306	37,516	21,224	12,934	18,473	23,609	3,053	3,848	9,701	5,866	2,864	2,103	7,881	3,635
1995	377,261	223,191	38,444	21,110	12,646	19,790	25,418	2,866	3,561	9,700	5,608	2,686	1,753	7,143	3,345
1995	387,359	229,952	39,601	20,790	12,687	21,624	27,928	2,633	3,301	9,819	5,218	2,523	1,602	6,596	3,085
2000	387,911	228,431	39,233	19,904	12,503	24,997	29,599	2,399	3,046	10,005	4,938	2,333	1,544	6,093	2,886
2005	386,572	227,758	39,981	18,873	12,661	25,669	30,879	2,118	2,768	10,016	4,467	1,983	1,389	5,535	2,525
2010	381,511	223,787	40,380	18,161	12,570	26,416	32,075	1,873	2,434	9,825	3,986	1,700	1,154	4,892	2,258
2015	377,598	221,404	41,340	17,100	12,201	26,881	33,486	1,622	2,051	9,609	3,499	1,393	960	4,135	1,917

==== Foreign and non-Japanese residents ====
The following table shows the population of foreigners and non-Japanese residents since 2014.

Sortable table
Year	Total	Chinese	Korean	Filipino	Vietnamese	Thai	Other
2014	3,394	1,619	587	301	136	219	532
2015	3,475	1,612	571	320	195	226	551
2016	3,475	1,595	542	319	248	239	552
2017	3,576	1,576	536	336	314	241	573
2018	3,715	1,563	557	344	392	242	617

=== Surrounding municipalities ===
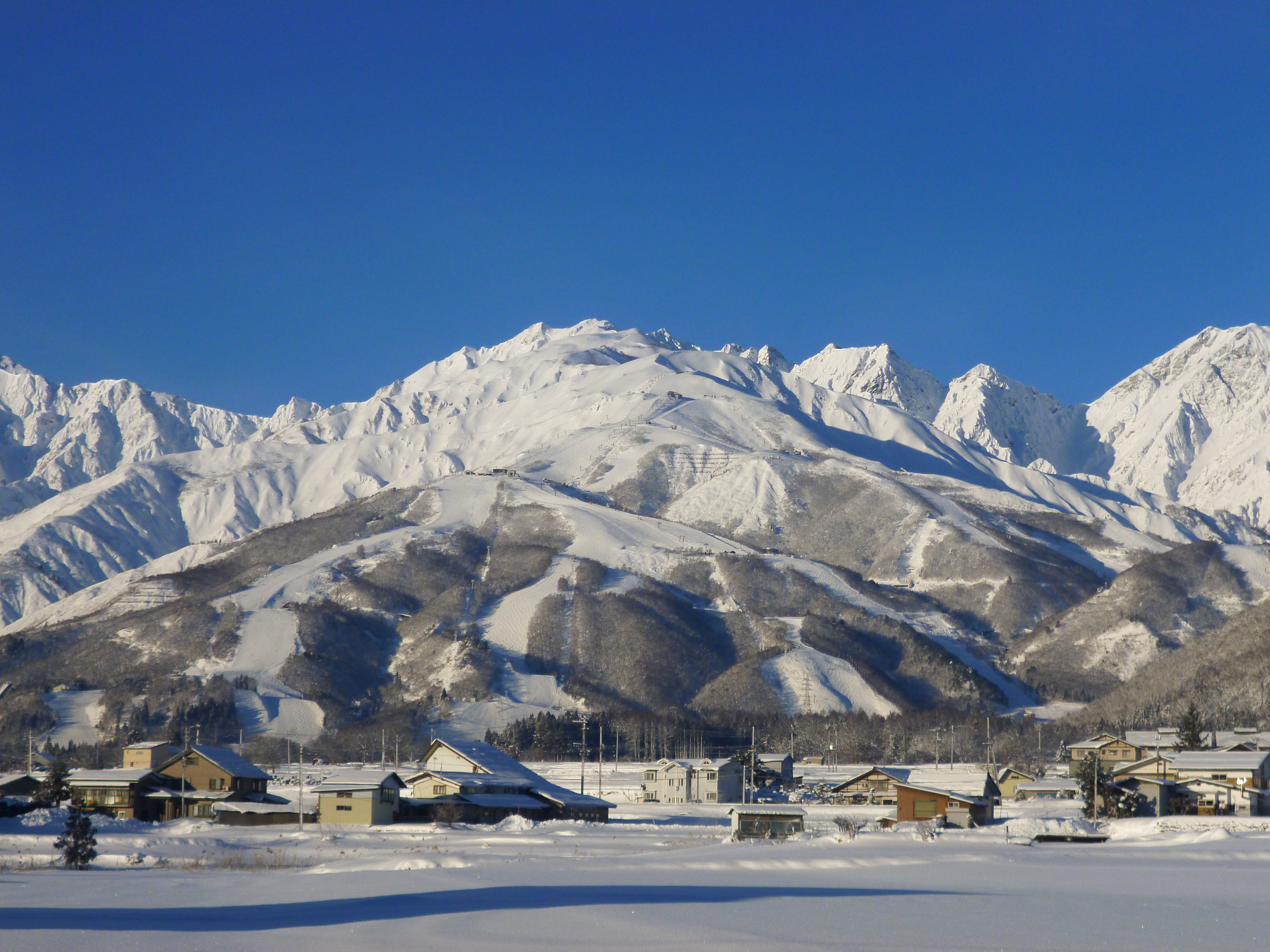
Hakuba Happo-one Winter Resort

Nagano Prefecture

- Shinano, located approximately 20 kilometers north of Nagano. Lake Nojiri is found in Shinano. Lake Nojiri was home to Kokusaimura (International Village), a landownership association, made up principally of Christian missionaries who had cottages there from the early 20th Century.

When we first went to Lake Nojiri, the International Village was like an island of affluence in a sea of poverty. But, as the Japanese economy recovered from the war, the scales tipped until we became an island of poverty in a sea of affluence.

— Alden Matthews, My Three Worlds (2007)

- Nakano, located in the Zennoji Plain, on the Chikuma River and surrounded by mountains, experienced significant growth after the 1998 Winter Olympics.
- Suzaka, a former castle town (jōkamachi) during the Edo period Tokugawa shogunate on the opposite side of the Chikuma River from Nagano. The city was noted in the Meiji period for its silk industry. After World War II, an electronics industry was established. The city is also noted for apples and grapes, and the Prefectural Agricultural Research Station is located there.
- Obuse, an important historical tourist town, approximately 30 minutes by Nagano Electric Railway train from Nagano Station. Obuse is home to a Hokusai museum, and Gansho-in, a Buddhist temple, has a ceiling painted by him. The largest hospital in the town, a former tuberculosis sanatorium, was built in the 1930s by J. G. Waller and the Anglican Church of Canada.
- Ueda, approximately 35 kilometers south of Nagano, was a former castle town of the Ueda Domain under the Tokugawa shogunate. The ruins of Ueda Castle are an important historical site in the city.
- Chikuma, located approximately 20 kilometers south of Nagano, includes numerous burial tombs (tumuli) from the Kofun period. During the Nara period, several important Man'yōshū poems were set here. The area around Chikuma prospered during the Edo period as several post stations along the pilgrimage route to the famed Zenkō-ji were located here. Obasute Station, a switchback station is located here.
- Ōmachi is approximately 40 kilometers west of Nagano. The Hida Mountains, also called the Japanese Northern Alps, with 3000m peaks surround Ōmachi. The area was part of the holdings of Matsumoto Domain during the Edo period.
- Omi is approximately 30 kilometers southwest of Nagano Station. The town is in the Hijiiri Highlands, and Hijiri-Kōgen Station is located here, as is Kitayama Dam.
- Chikuhoku is located in the Matsumoto Basin, and the Higashijo Dam and Onikuma Dam are located here. Most of the area was under the control of Matsumoto Domain during the Edo period.
- Ikusaka is approximately 50 kilometers southwest of Nagano, in the center of Nagano Prefecture. Two dams, Ikusaka Dam and Taira Dam are found here. The area of present-day Ikusaka was part of the holdings of Matsumoto Domain during the Edo period.
- Ogawa is approximately 20 kilometers west of Nagano. It is listed as one of The Most Beautiful Villages in Japan. It is an important agriculture center, primarily rice cultivation.
- Hakuba, located 45 km west of Nagano Station, is an internationally renowned ski resort town in the northern Japan Alps. The surrounding valley has an annual snow fall of over 11 meters, and the 10 ski resorts have more than 200 runs. The village was an important site for 1998 Winter Olympics (Alpine skiing, ski jumping, and cross-country). Most of Hakuba is located in Chūbu-Sangaku National Park.
- Otari is located approximately 55 kilometers northwest of Nagano Station. It is in the mountainous far northwest of Nagano Prefecture, bordered by Niigata Prefecture to the north and west. Much of the village is within the borders of the Chūbu-Sangaku National Park or the Myōkō-Togakushi Renzan National Park.

Niigata Prefecture

- Myōkō, on the border of Nagano Prefecture, lies in mountains surrounding the historical entrance to the Echigo Plains. The city is surrounded by five mountains. Madarao, Myōkō, Kurohime, Togakushi and Iizuna are collectively known as the Five Peaks of Northern Shinano (Hokushingogaku). Mount Myōkō (2,454 m) is in the city, much of which is within the borders of the Myōkō-Togakushi Renzan National Park.

== Climate ==
Nagano has a hot-summer humid continental climate (Köppen climate classification Dfa) that borders on a humid subtropical climate (Köppen climate classification Cfa). Its location in a sheltered inland valley means it receives less precipitation than any part of Japan except Hokkaidō. The city receives heavy winter snow totaling 2.57 metres (101 in) from December to March, but it is less gloomy during these cold months than the coast from Hagi to Wakkanai.

Climate data for Nagano (1991–2020 normals, extremes 1889–present)
Month	Jan	Feb	Mar	Apr	May	Jun	Jul	Aug	Sep	Oct	Nov	Dec	Year
Record high °C (°F)	18.1 (64.6)	22.5 (72.5)	28.5 (83.3)	30.8 (87.4)	34.2 (93.6)	35.9 (96.6)	37.9 (100.2)	38.7 (101.7)	36.3 (97.3)	32.2 (90.0)	26.2 (79.2)	22.0 (71.6)	38.7 (101.7)
Mean daily maximum °C (°F)	3.8 (38.8)	5.3 (41.5)	10.3 (50.5)	17.4 (63.3)	23.2 (73.8)	26.1 (79.0)	29.7 (85.5)	31.1 (88.0)	26.2 (79.2)	19.7 (67.5)	13.4 (56.1)	6.9 (44.4)	17.8 (64.0)
Daily mean °C (°F)	−0.4 (31.3)	0.4 (32.7)	4.3 (39.7)	10.6 (51.1)	16.4 (61.5)	20.4 (68.7)	24.3 (75.7)	25.4 (77.7)	21.0 (69.8)	14.4 (57.9)	7.9 (46.2)	2.3 (36.1)	12.3 (54.1)
Mean daily minimum °C (°F)	−3.9 (25.0)	−3.7 (25.3)	−0.5 (31.1)	4.9 (40.8)	10.9 (51.6)	16.1 (61.0)	20.5 (68.9)	21.5 (70.7)	17.2 (63.0)	10.3 (50.5)	3.4 (38.1)	−1.5 (29.3)	7.9 (46.2)
Record low °C (°F)	−17.0 (1.4)	−16.4 (2.5)	−14.6 (5.7)	−6.5 (20.3)	−1.8 (28.8)	3.9 (39.0)	10.2 (50.4)	10.7 (51.3)	5.5 (41.9)	−1.9 (28.6)	−11.4 (11.5)	−15.2 (4.6)	−17.0 (1.4)
Average precipitation mm (inches)	54.6 (2.15)	49.1 (1.93)	60.1 (2.37)	56.9 (2.24)	69.3 (2.73)	106.1 (4.18)	137.7 (5.42)	111.8 (4.40)	125.5 (4.94)	100.3 (3.95)	44.4 (1.75)	49.4 (1.94)	965.1 (38.00)
Average snowfall cm (inches)	63 (25)	50 (20)	17 (6.7)	2 (0.8)	0 (0)	0 (0)	0 (0)	0 (0)	0 (0)	0 (0)	1 (0.4)	30 (12)	163 (64)
Average precipitation days (≥ 0.5 mm)	12.7	11.0	11.3	9.8	9.6	11.6	13.5	10.8	10.6	9.2	8.6	11.2	130.0
Average snowy days	24.0	20.1	15.6	3.2	0.0	0.0	0.0	0.0	0.0	0.0	3.6	19.0	85.6
Average relative humidity (%)	79	74	68	61	63	71	75	73	74	75	76	79	72
Mean monthly sunshine hours	128.4	140.2	173.3	199.4	214.8	167.4	168.8	201.1	151.2	152.1	142.3	131.1	1,969.9
Source: Japan Meteorological Agency (1991–2020 normals, extremes 1889–present)

Climate data for Shinshūshinmachi, Nagano (1991–2020 normals, extremes 1978–present)
Month	Jan	Feb	Mar	Apr	May	Jun	Jul	Aug	Sep	Oct	Nov	Dec	Year
Record high °C (°F)	15.3 (59.5)	21.0 (69.8)	28.3 (82.9)	30.8 (87.4)	34.6 (94.3)	35.8 (96.4)	37.2 (99.0)	38.6 (101.5)	36.0 (96.8)	29.8 (85.6)	25.2 (77.4)	21.6 (70.9)	38.6 (101.5)
Mean daily maximum °C (°F)	3.6 (38.5)	4.9 (40.8)	9.9 (49.8)	17.1 (62.8)	22.8 (73.0)	25.8 (78.4)	29.2 (84.6)	30.4 (86.7)	25.4 (77.7)	19.1 (66.4)	13.2 (55.8)	6.8 (44.2)	17.4 (63.3)
Daily mean °C (°F)	−1.4 (29.5)	−0.8 (30.6)	3.1 (37.6)	9.3 (48.7)	15.1 (59.2)	19.2 (66.6)	22.9 (73.2)	23.9 (75.0)	19.5 (67.1)	13.0 (55.4)	6.6 (43.9)	1.2 (34.2)	11.0 (51.8)
Mean daily minimum °C (°F)	−5.5 (22.1)	−5.4 (22.3)	−2.1 (28.2)	2.8 (37.0)	8.5 (47.3)	14.1 (57.4)	18.8 (65.8)	19.5 (67.1)	15.5 (59.9)	8.8 (47.8)	2.0 (35.6)	−2.7 (27.1)	6.2 (43.2)
Record low °C (°F)	−15.3 (4.5)	−13.4 (7.9)	−10.3 (13.5)	−5.8 (21.6)	−1.5 (29.3)	4.1 (39.4)	11.6 (52.9)	11.2 (52.2)	4.3 (39.7)	−0.6 (30.9)	−4.6 (23.7)	−12.3 (9.9)	−15.3 (4.5)
Average precipitation mm (inches)	56.2 (2.21)	52.4 (2.06)	76.3 (3.00)	76.4 (3.01)	88.7 (3.49)	123.2 (4.85)	146.5 (5.77)	111.2 (4.38)	148.7 (5.85)	122.8 (4.83)	53.8 (2.12)	51.3 (2.02)	1,107.4 (43.60)
Average precipitation days (≥ 1.0 mm)	10.4	8.8	10.8	9.4	9.5	11.0	13.4	9.9	10.4	9.1	7.6	10.3	120.7
Mean monthly sunshine hours	123.2	139.5	171.6	200.4	209.3	158.7	158.1	192.1	137.1	145.0	139.5	124.8	1,899.1
Source: Japan Meteorological Agency (1991–2020 normals, extremes 1978–present)

== History ==
=== Ancient ages ===
Nagano is located in former Shinano Province and developed from the Nara period as a temple town at the gate of the famous Zenkō-ji, a 7th-century Buddhist temple which was relocated to this location in 642 AD.

In the southern section of Nagano City there is a series of over 500 burial mounds at Ōmuro Kofun - a National historic site - dating from the 5th-8th centuries.

=== Middle ages ===
During the Sengoku period (c. 1467 – c. 1600), the area was hotly contested between the forces of the Uesugi clan based in Echigo Province and the Takeda clan based in Kai Province. The several Battles of Kawanakajima between Uesugi Kenshin and Takeda Shingen were fought near here.

=== Early modern ages ===
During the Edo period (1603 and 1868), much of the area came under the control of the Sanada clan based at Matsushiro Domain. The area suffered from flooding in 1742, and from a destructive earthquake in 1847. Post station on the Hokkoku Kaidō highway connecting Edo with the Sea of Japan coast.

=== Late modern ages ===
Following the Meiji restoration and the creation of the municipalities system on April 1, 1889, the modern town of Nagano was established. Nagano was elevated to city status on April 1, 1897. During World War II, construction of the Matsushiro Underground Imperial Headquarters as the last redoubt for the Japanese government following the projected American invasion of Japan was started in 1944, but was aborted in 1945 due to the end of war.

It was the first city founded in Nagano Prefecture and the 43rd city in Japan. Nagano hosted the 1998 Winter Olympics, 1998 Winter Paralympics, and the 2005 Special Olympics World Winter Games.

=== Contemporary ages ===
Growth of the city

The city borders expanded on July 1, 1923, with the annexation of the neighbouring town of Yoshida and villages of Sarita, Miwa and Komaki.

The city again expanded on April 1, 1954, by annexing neighbouring villages of Asahi, Furusato, Yanagihara, Wakatsuki, Asakawa, Naganuma, Amori, Odagiri, Imoi and Mamejima. In 1959, due to the flooding of Chikuma River, 71 people died or were missing and 20,000 homes were flooded. On October 16, 1966, the city again expanded by annexing the neighbouring towns of Kawanakajima, Matsushiro and Wakaho, and villages of Shinonoi, Kohoku, Shinko, and Naniai. During the 1985 Matsushiro earthquake, 27 people died and 60 homes were destroyed or badly damaged due to landslides. In 1999, Nagano was designated as a core city (中核市, Chūkakushi), a category of Japanese city. Nagano continued to expand on January 1, 2005, by absorbing the municipalities of Toyono, and the village of Togakushi, and Kinasa (from Kamiminochi District), and the village of Ōoka (from Sarashina District).

On January 1, 2010, Nagano absorbed the town of Shinshūshinmachi and the village of Nakajō from Kamiminochi District.

== Politics ==
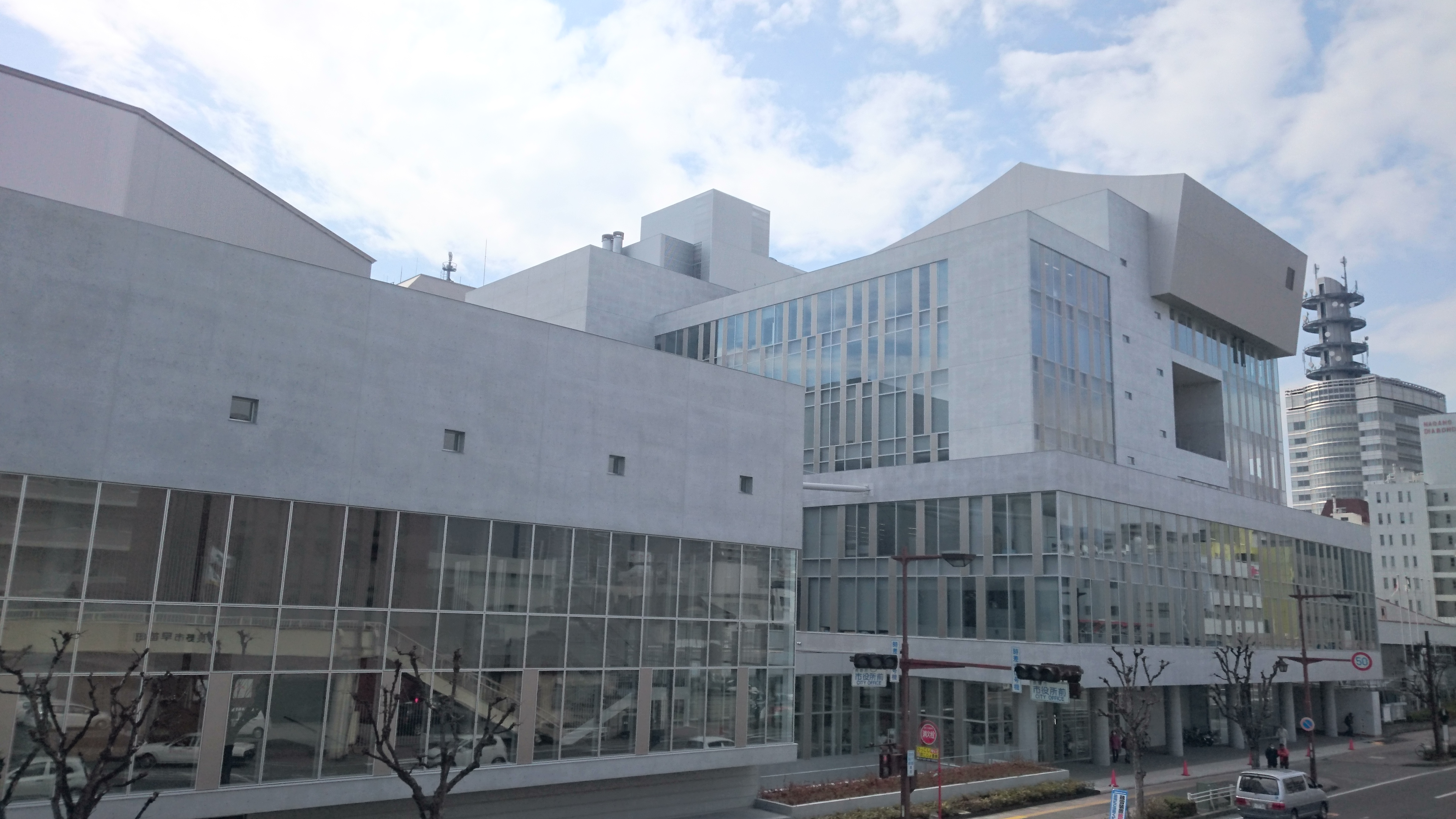
Nagano City Hall

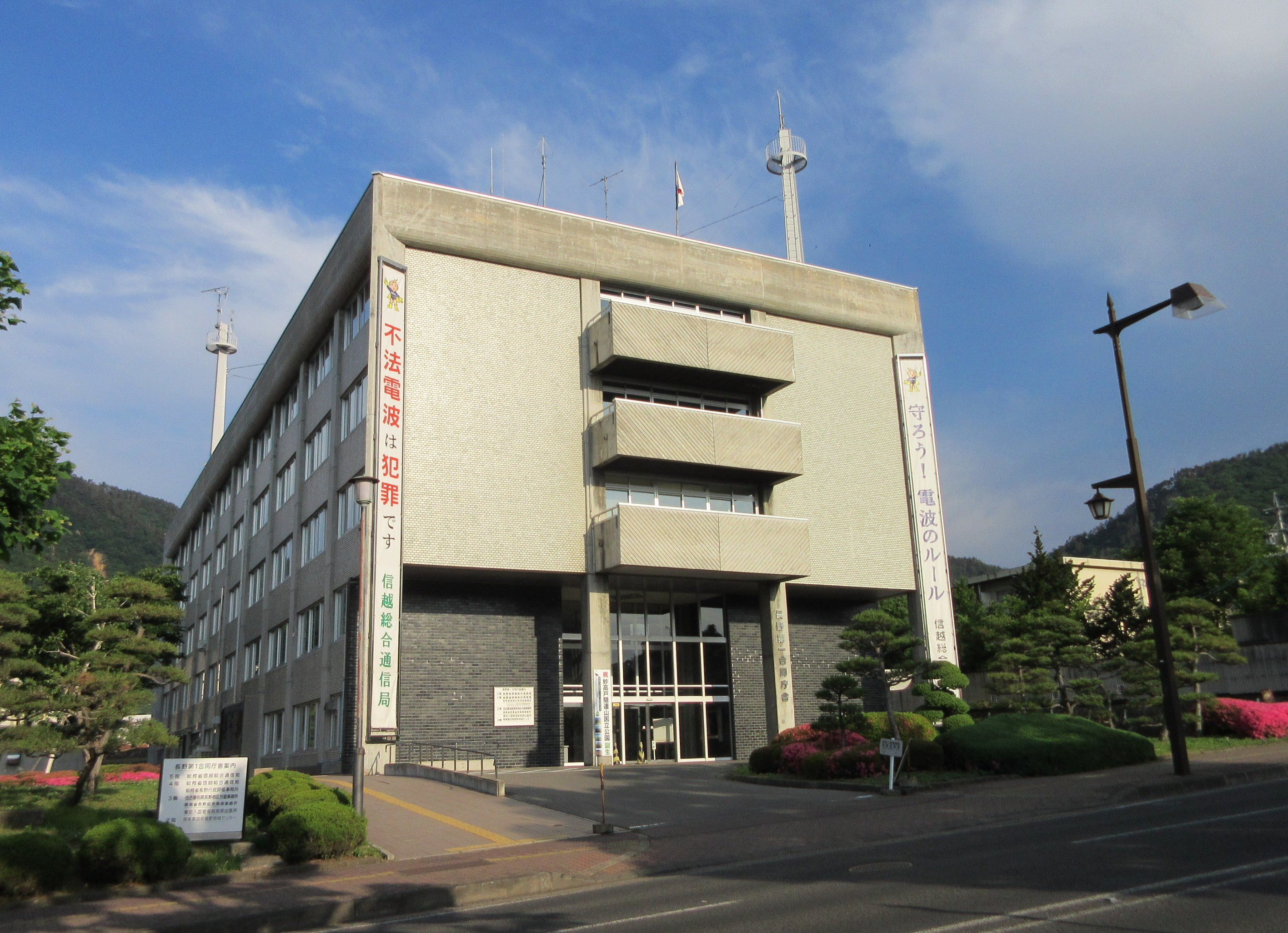
Nagano National Government Building No.1

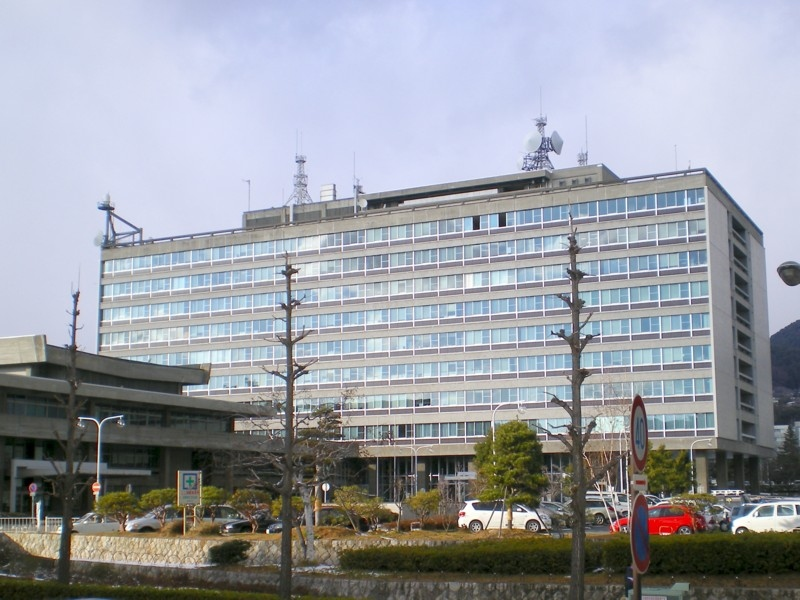
Nagano Prefectural Government Building

Nagano has a mayor-council form of government with a directly elected mayor and a unicameral city legislature of 39 members. The city and neighboring towns of Shinano, Iizuna, and Ogawa contribute 11 members to the 57-member Nagano Prefectural Assembly. In terms of national politics, parts of Nagano can be found in one of two national districts, Nagano 1st District, which consists of Iiyama, Nagano (except for the recently annexed areas in District 2), Nakano, and Suzaka, as well as the Kamitakai, Shimominochi, and Shimotakai, and Nagano 2nd District, which consists of Matsumoto and Ōmachi, as well as the Higashichikuma, Kamiminochi, Kitaazumi, Minamiazumi, and several areas annexed into Nagano city, specifically the Sarashina as well as the former towns of Kinasa, Togakushi, and Toyono, in the lower house of the National Diet.

=== Government ===
==== Mayors ====
Non-direct election

- Hachirouemon Sato, 1897-1899 (assumed office as City Hall clerk)
- Kouemon Suzuki, 1899-1911 (two terms)
- Hajime Makino, 1911-1921 (two terms)
- Koji Mita, 1921
- Bensaburou Maruyama, 1922-1934 (three terms)
- Nanasawa, 1934
- Iuemon Fujii, 1934-1937
- Takano, 1937-1941
- Kuraji Ishigaki, 1941-1942 (died in office)
- Takano, 1942-1946

Mayors
Direct election

- Hisashimon Matsuhashi, 1947-1952 (two terms)
- Itaru Kurashima, 1954-1962 (two terms)
- Tadao Natsume, 1962-1973 (three terms)
- Masayuki Yanagihara, 1973-1985 (three terms)
- Tasuku Tsukada, 1985-2001 (four terms)
- Shouichi Washizawa, 2001-2013 (three terms)
- Hisao Katō, 2013–2021 (two terms)
- Kenji Ogiwara, 2021–present (one term)

=== National ===
==== Ministry ====
- Ministry of Internal Affairs and Communications
  - Shin-Etsu Communications Bureau
  - Nagano Administration Evaluation Office
- Ministry of Justice
  - Nagano District Public Prosecutors Office
  - Nagano Regional Legal Bureau
  - Nagano Probation Office
  - Nagano Public Security Research Office
  - Nagano Juvenile Detention Facility
  - Nagano Prison, Nagano Detention Office
  - Tokyo Office of Entry and Residence, Nagano Office
  - Judicial bodies
    - Nagano District Court
    - Nagano Family Court
    - Nagano Summary Court
- Ministry of Finance
  - Nagano Finance Office
  - Nagoya Customs Nagano District Cabinet Order Office
  - Kanto Shin-Etsu National Tax Dispute Tribunal Nagano Branch
  - Nagano Tax Office
- Ministry of Health, Labour and Welfare
  - Nagano Labor Bureau
  - Nagano Public Employment Security Office
  - Shinonoi Public Employment Security Office
  - Nagano Labor Standards Supervision Station
- Japan Pension Service
  - Nagano Kita Pension Office
  - Nagano Minami Pension Office
- Ministry of Agriculture, Forestry and Fisheries
  - Nagano Agricultural Administration Office
    - Nagano Statistics and Information Center
  - Chubu Forest Management Bureau
- Ministry of Land, Infrastructure, Transport and Tourism
  - Nagano Regional Meteorological Observatory
  - Japan Meteorological Agency Matsushiro Earthquake Observatory
  - Hokuriku Regional Development Bureau Chikuma River River Office
  - Kanto Regional Development Bureau Nagano management office
  - Kanto Regional Development Bureau Nagano National Highway Office
- Ministry of the Environment
  - 長野自然環境事務所
    - 戸隠自然保護官事務所
- Ministry of Defense
  - SDF Nagano Regional Cooperation Headquarters

=== Prefectural ===
- Nagano Prefectural Government Building

== Public facilities ==
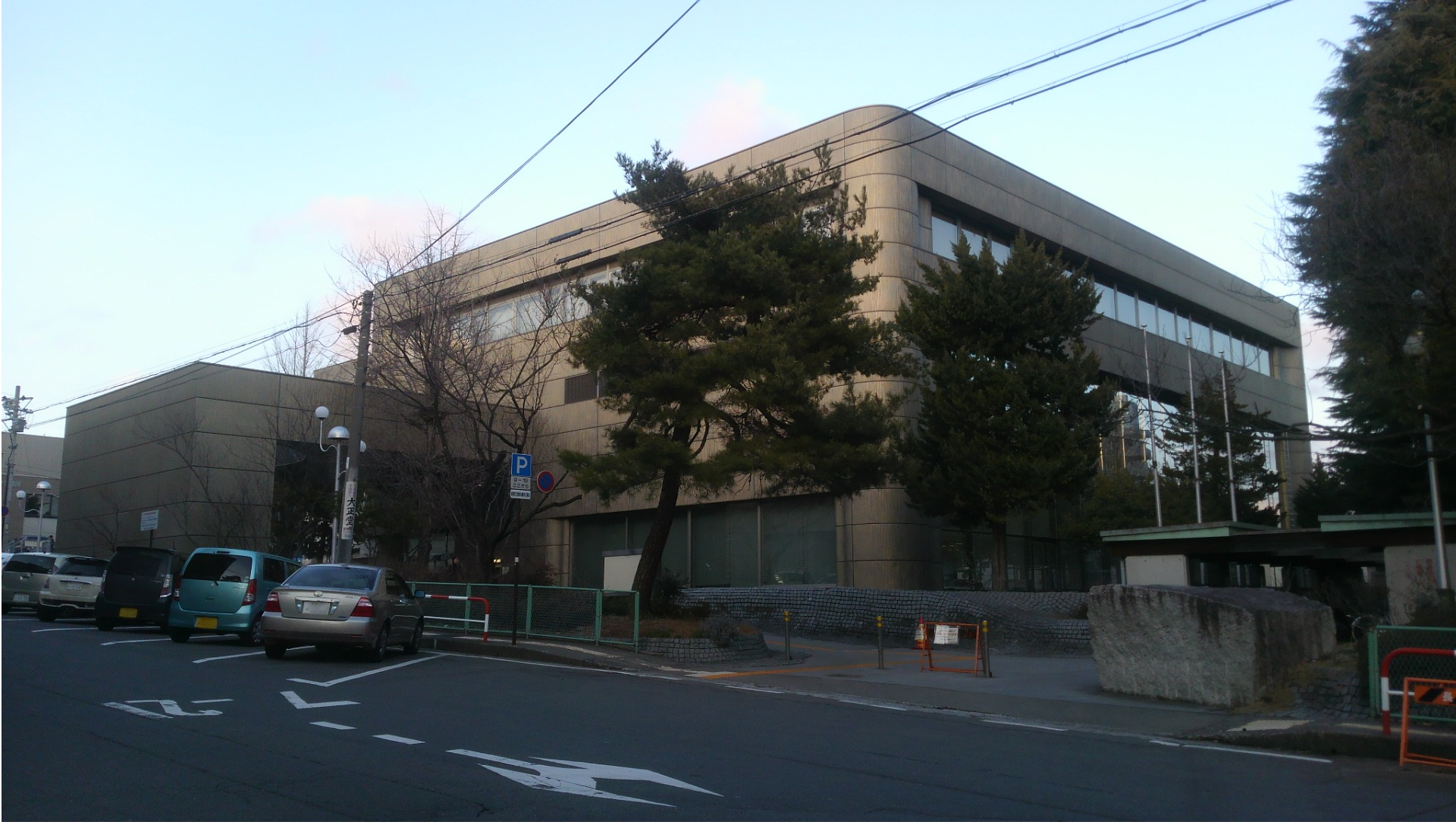
Nagano City Library

=== Library ===
- Nagano City Library, located approximately 1.5 kilometers north of Nagano Station, near the Shinano Educational Museum
- Nagano City Nambu Library, located 400 meters south of Shinonoi Station
- Nagano Prefectural Library, located 800 meters south of Nagano Station
- The University of Nagano public library, located 700 meters north of Hongō Station
- Nagano City Lifelong Learning Center, located 350 meters west of Shiyakushomae Station

== External relations ==
=== Twin towns – sister cities ===
==== International ====
Sister City

City	Country	State	since
Clearwater	United States	Florida	March 1959
Shijiazhuang	China	Hebei	April 1981
Ecatepec (Ciudad Azteca)	Mexico	Mexico	March 2004

==== National ====
Partnership cities

City	Prefecture	region	since
Jōetsu	(Niigata Prefecture) Niigata	Chūbu region	October 14, 2005
Kanazawa	(Ishikawa Prefecture) Ishikawa	Chūbu region	February 15, 2007
Kōfu	(Yamanashi Prefecture) Yamanashi	Chūbu region	September 1, 2007
Shizuoka	(Shizuoka Prefecture) Shizuoka	Chūbu region	July 1, 2010
Toyama	(Toyama Prefecture) Toyama	Chūbu region	October 2, 2012
Fukui	(Fukui Prefecture) Fukui	Chūbu region	August 9, 2013

== Economy ==
The gross value of goods and services of the economy in the city of Nagano in 2016 was estimated to be 4,438,580,046,000 yen, approximately US$40.5 billion. The largest percentage of this, 41.8%, was related to wholesale and retail, followed by healthcare and welfare, 25.9%, manufacturing, was 13.7%.

In 2016, Nagano City had 183,710 people in employment, with 21.1% of workers in wholesale or retail, 14.%% in healthcare and welfare, and 11.6% are in manufacturing. Other major employers include hotels and restaurants, 9% of employees, and construction industry, 7.9%; farming and forestry workers comprised 1.1% of the working population.

=== Major companies with headquarters in Nagano City ===
- Densan (information processing)
- Hachijuni Bank (financial)
- Heiando (bookstore)
- Hokto (agriculture)
- Hokushinrika (physical and chemical equipment sales)
- Kakuto (construction)
- Kawanakajima Bus (transportation)
- Kitano Construction (construction) who established the Kitano Museum of Art
- Kyowa (service)
- Maeda Seisakusho (machinery)
- Maruchi (food wholesaler)
- Marukome (food)
- Moriki (pharmaceuticals)
- Moriya (construction)
- Nagaden Bus (transportation)
- Nagano Electric Railway (transportation)
- Nagano Japan Radio (electronics)
- Nagano Tokyu Department Store
- Nagano Toshi Gas (gas supplier)
- Ogasaka Ski (ski manufacturer)
- Shinko Electric Industries (electronics)
- Sunny Health (health food)
- Takachiho (souvenir wholesaler)
- Takamisawa (glass, concrete, ...)
- Takasawa (steel, construction materials)
- Tokyo Horei (publishing)
- Tosys (construction)
- Yawataya Isogoro (spices)

=== Other major companies in Nagano City ===
- Fujitsu has a magnetic storage device and circuit board factory in Nagano
- Japan Post has one of its 10 national Postal College (郵政大学校, Yuuseidaigakkou) training centers located in Nagano City, 1.5 km east of Nagano Station.
- Nishina, a manufacturer of hydraulic equipment for construction machinery and industrial vehicles, including forklifts, was established in 1939. It's HQ and one of its factories are in the Toyono area of Nagano City. Another of its factories is in neighboring Suzaka. In 2001, Nishina joined the Toyota Industries group.
- Ricoh

=== Mass media ===
==== Regional newspapers ====
- The Shinano Mainichi Shimbun
- Nagano Shinmin Shimbun

==== Television ====
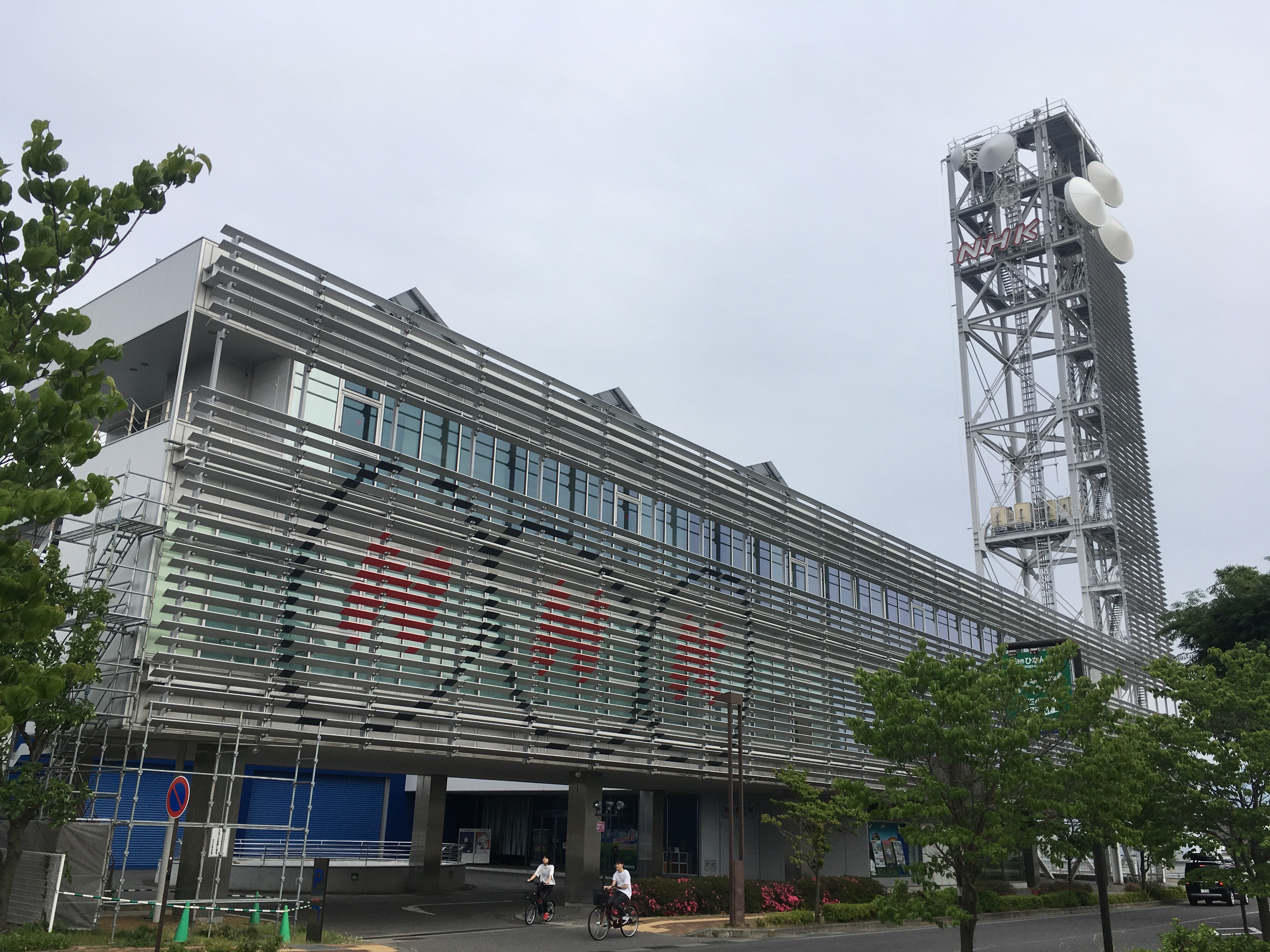
NHK Studio in the Wakasato District of Nagano

- NHK Nagano
- Shin-etsu Broadcasting (SBC) (Japan News Network)
- Nagano Broadcasting Systems (NBS) (Fuji News Network)
- TV Shinshu (Nippon News Network) and (Nippon Television Network System)
- Asahi Broadcasting Nagano (ABN) (All-Nippon News Network)
- Information Network Community (Shinano Mainichi Newspaper Network)

== Education ==
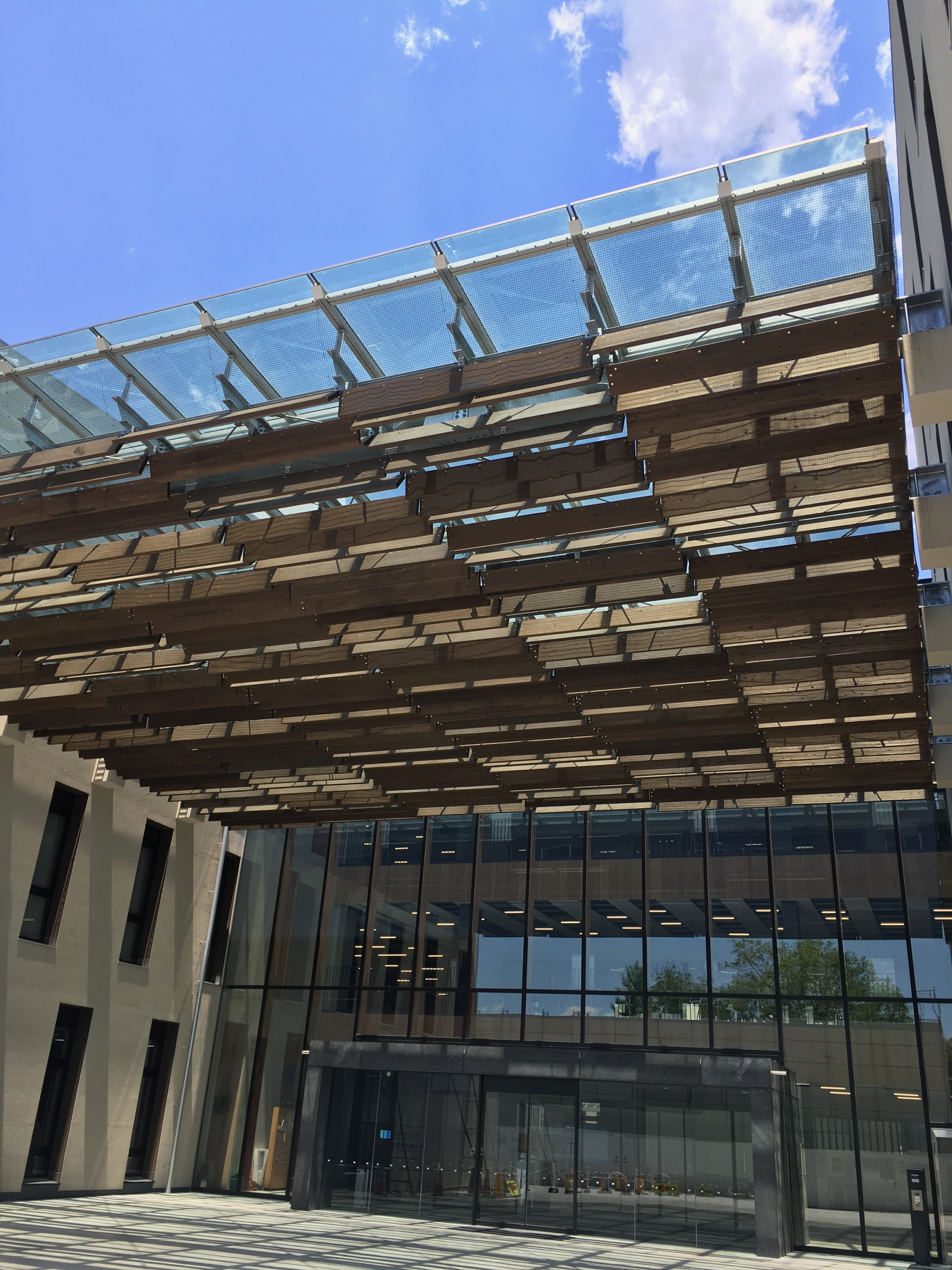
The University of Nagano Main Entrance

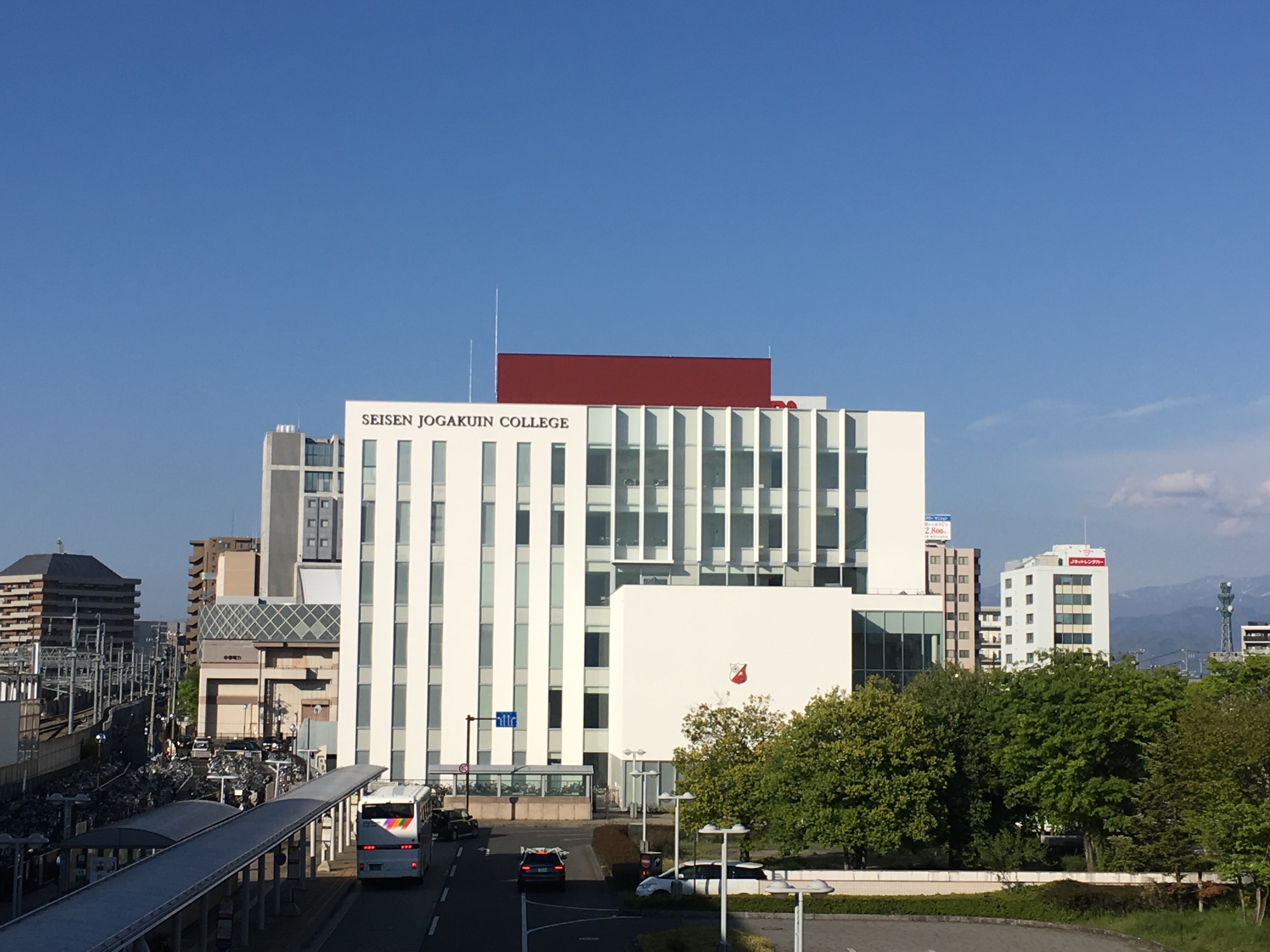
Seisen Jogakuin College at Nagano Station, East Exit

=== Universities and colleges ===
Nagano is home to several private and public universities. Four of the ten universities recognized as major universities in the prefecture have campuses in the city, including the newest prefectural university, The University of Nagano.

Public

- Shinshu University, Shindai is a Japanese national university with campuses also in Matsumoto, Ueda, and Minamiminowa, Nagano.
- The University of Nagano, a 4-year university, replaced the 2-year Nagano Prefectural College in 2018. The university has two campuses, named for their location in Nagano, Miwa Campus and Gocho Campus. The university has an affiliated Center for Social Innovation Initiatives. The university is unique in Japan in that all first-year students live in a dormitory and all second-year students take part in overseas study programs.
- Nagano Prefectural College, is a 2-year prefectural college in the Miwa area of Nagano City. The predecessor of the school was founded in 1929. It became the 4-year university, The University of Nagano, in April 2018. Nagano Prefectural College will close when its final students graduate in March 2020.
- National Institute of Technology, Nagano College, is a national engineering college located in the Tokuma area of Nagano City. The national college has 5 departments: Mechanical Engineering, Electrical and Electronic Engineering, Electronics and Control Engineering, Electronic and Computer Science, and Civil Engineering.
- Nagano Prefectural Agricultural College is a two-year practical, comprehensive agricultural college located in the Matsushiro area of Nagano.

Private

- Seisen Jogakuin College is a Catholic private women's college, with both 4-year and 2-year programs in its attached Seisen Jogakuin College (Junior College). It has a sister school, Seisen University located in Tokyo. Its newest campus opened in April 2019 beside the east exit of Nagano Station.
- Nagano Women's Junior College is a private women's junior college located in the Miwa area of Nagano, approximately 700 meters to the east of The University of Nagano.
- Nagano University of Health and Medicine opened in 2015 in the Kawanakajima area of Nagano. It has a Faculty of Nursing and a Faculty of Health Science for rehabilitation.
- Seisen Jogakuin College (Junior College), established in 1966, is a specialized training school.

Former schools

- Nagano College of Economics was a junior college in Nagano from 1967 to 2009.

=== High schools ===
Prefectural

- Nagano Prefectural Nagano Senior High School
- Nagano Prefectural Nagano Yoshida High School
  - Nagano Prefectural Yoshida Senior High School Fixed Part-time School
- Nagano Prefectural Nagano West Senior High School
  - Nagano Senior Nagano West Senior High School Chujo School
- Nagano Prefectural Nagano East Senior High School
- Nagano Prefectural Nagano High School of Technology
- Nagano Prefectural Nagano Commercial Senior High School
- Nagano Prefectural Nagano South Senior High School
- Nagano Prefectural Sarashina Agriculture High School
- Nagano Prefectural Shinonoi High School
  - Nagano Prefectural Shinonoi High School Saikyou Branch
- Nagano Prefectural Matsushiro High School

Municipal

- Nagano City Nagano Junior and Senior High School

Private

- Nagano Seisen Jogakuin Junior and Senior High School
- Nagano Women's High School
- Nagano Shunei Senior High School
- Nagano Nihon University Junior and Senior High School
- Bunka Gakuen Nagano Junior and Senior High School
- Tsukuba Kaisei High School, Nagano Learning Center

=== Primary and secondary education ===
Nagano has 55 public elementary schools and 24 public middle schools operated by the city government, along with one public middle school operated by the national government and four private middle schools. The city has 12 public high schools operated by the Nagano Prefectural Board of Education, of which three are vocational, one public high school operated by the city government, and five private high schools. In addition, the city has four special education schools.

== Transportation ==
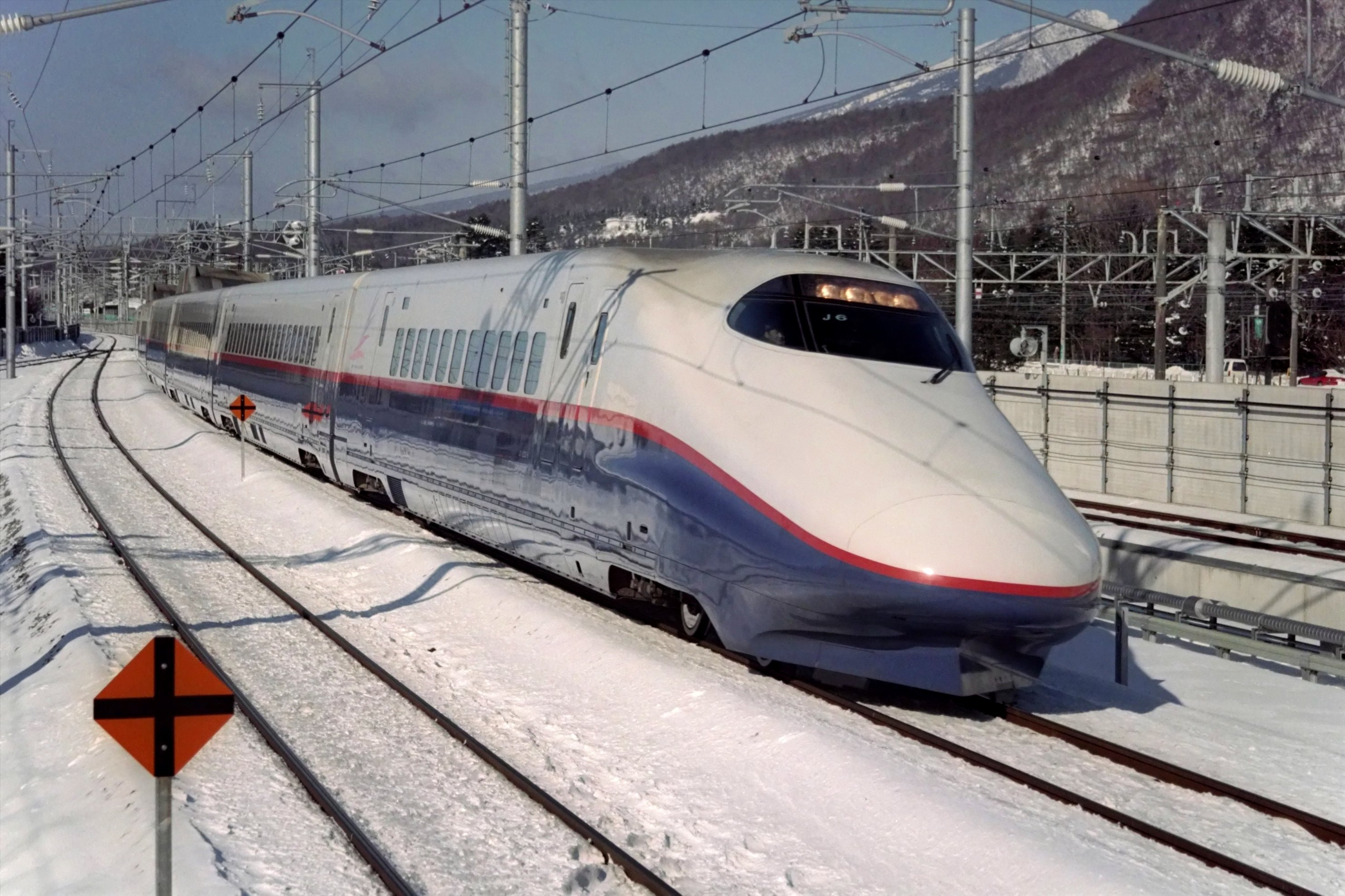
A Nagano Shinkansen E2 Series "J" set in February 1998 built for the 1998 Winter Olympics

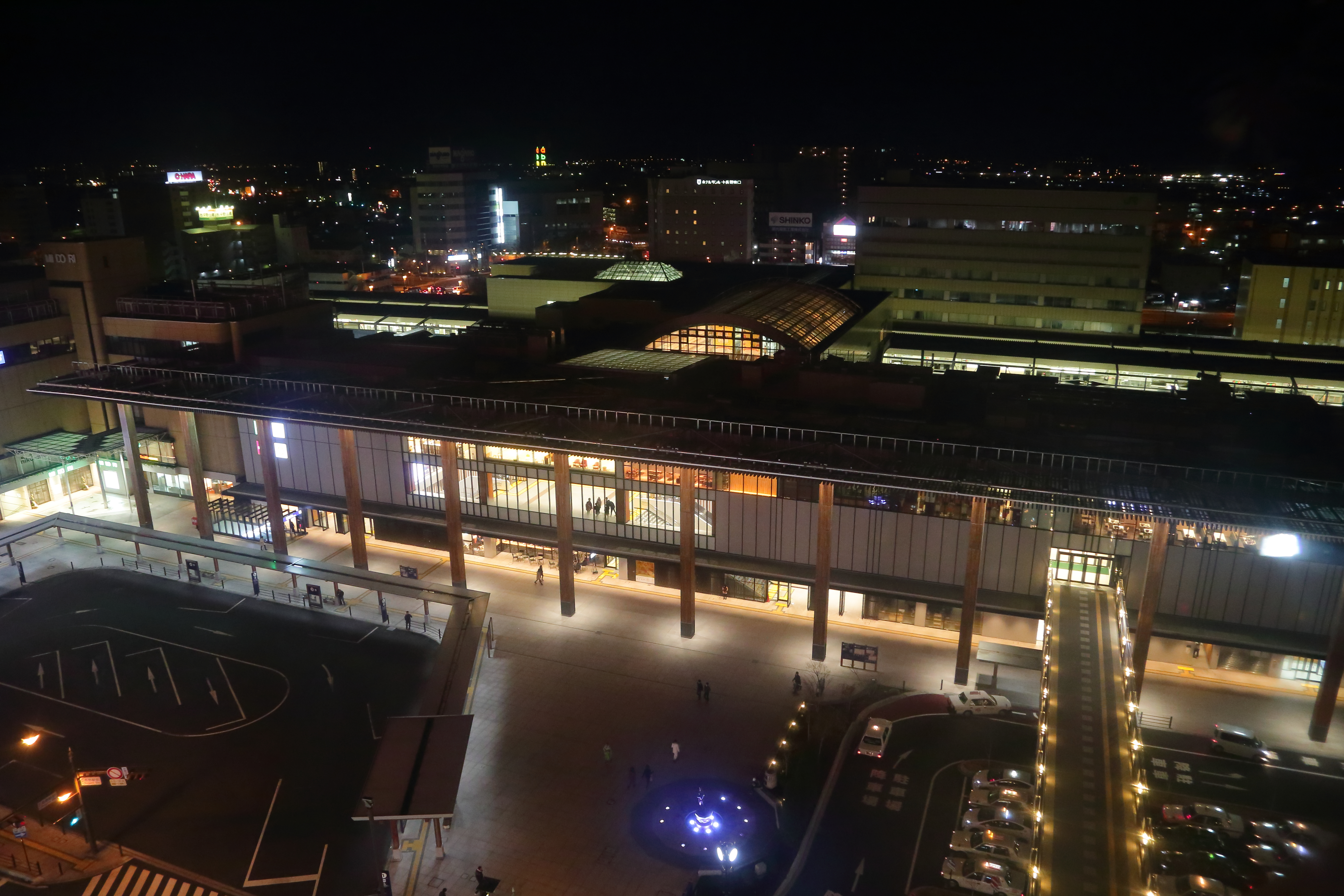
Nagano Station Zenkō-ji exit at night.

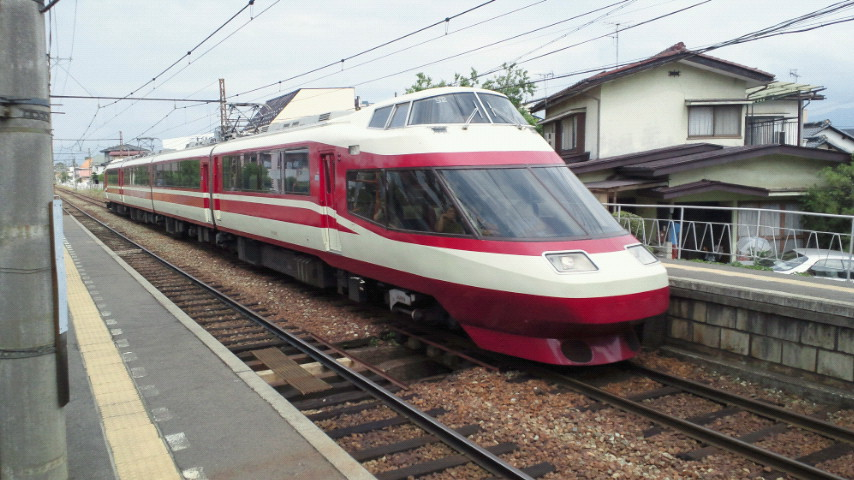
Nagano Electric Railway 1000 Series Train at Hongō Station

=== Airways ===
==== Airport ====
The nearest airport is Matsumoto Airport, connected via a 70-minute express bus from Nagano City.

=== Railways ===
The city's main railway hub is Nagano Station. The coming of the 1998 Winter Olympics saw important changes to the transportation systems. Nagano Station and the smaller Shinonoi Station were expanded, and with the construction of the Athletes village for the Games in the Kawanakajima area, Imai Station was opened. Finally, the Hokuriku Shinkansen, initially named the Nagano Shinkansen, connecting Nagano to Takasaki, Gunma where it merges with the Jōetsu Shinkansen and continues to Ōmiya Station and Tokyo Station, opened in 1997 to accommodate the expected increase in travelers to Nagano. This reduced by half the travel time between Tokyo and Nagano, to 79 minutes for 221 kilometers. As the main railway hub of the region, Nagano Station connects JR East, Shinano Railway, and Nagano Electric Railway in the city center. The JR trains carry 36,612 passengers per day with private rail carrying another 15,082 (and buses carry 20,229 passengers).

==== High-speed rail ====
East Japan Railway Company (JR East)

- Hokuriku Shinkansen: - Nagano -

==== Conventional lines ====
East Japan Railway Company (JR East)

- Shin'etsu Main Line: - Shinonoi - Imai - Kawanakajima - Amori - Nagano -
- Shinonoi Line: - Inariyama - Shinonoi -
- Iiyama Line: - Toyono - Shinano-Asano - Tategahana -

Shinano Railway (Shintetsu)

- Kita-Shinano Line: Nagano - Kita-Nagano - Sansai - Toyono -
- Shinano Railway Line: - Shinonoi -

Nagano Electric Railway

- Nagano Line: Nagano - Shiyakushomae - Gondō - Zenkōjishita - Hongō - Kirihara - Shinano-Yoshida - Asahi - Fuzokuchūgakumae - Yanagihara -

=== Busways ===
Buses for the Kawanakajima Bus and the Nagano Dentetsu Bus Co. service the city and surrounding areas, departing both Nagano Station and the Nagano Bus Terminal just west of the station. Local bus provider, Alpico Kōtsū, departs from a dedicated office across the street from the Zenkō-ji Exit of Nagano Station. Long-distance highway bus services depart from the East Exit of Nagano Station. There is also a daily bus to Narita Airport.

Gururin-go is a central district bus that runs in a circular loop from Nagano Station to Zennoji, passing Zenkō-ji, the Nagano Prefectural Office, and the Nagano Bus Terminal. Regardless of where you board or disembark, the fare is 150 yen.

=== Roads ===
==== Expressway ====
- Jōshin-etsu Expressway
- Nagano Expressway

==== Japan National Route ====
- National Route 18
- National Route 19
- National Route 117
- National Route 403
- National Route 406

== Local attractions ==
Nagano is surrounded by mountains which boast hiking, camping, and cycling. In addition, the city includes 46 national-designated cultural assets, 55 prefectural-designated cultural assets, 298 municipal-designated cultural assets, and finally 59 national-registered structures and 7 monuments in Nagano city.

=== Temples and shrines ===
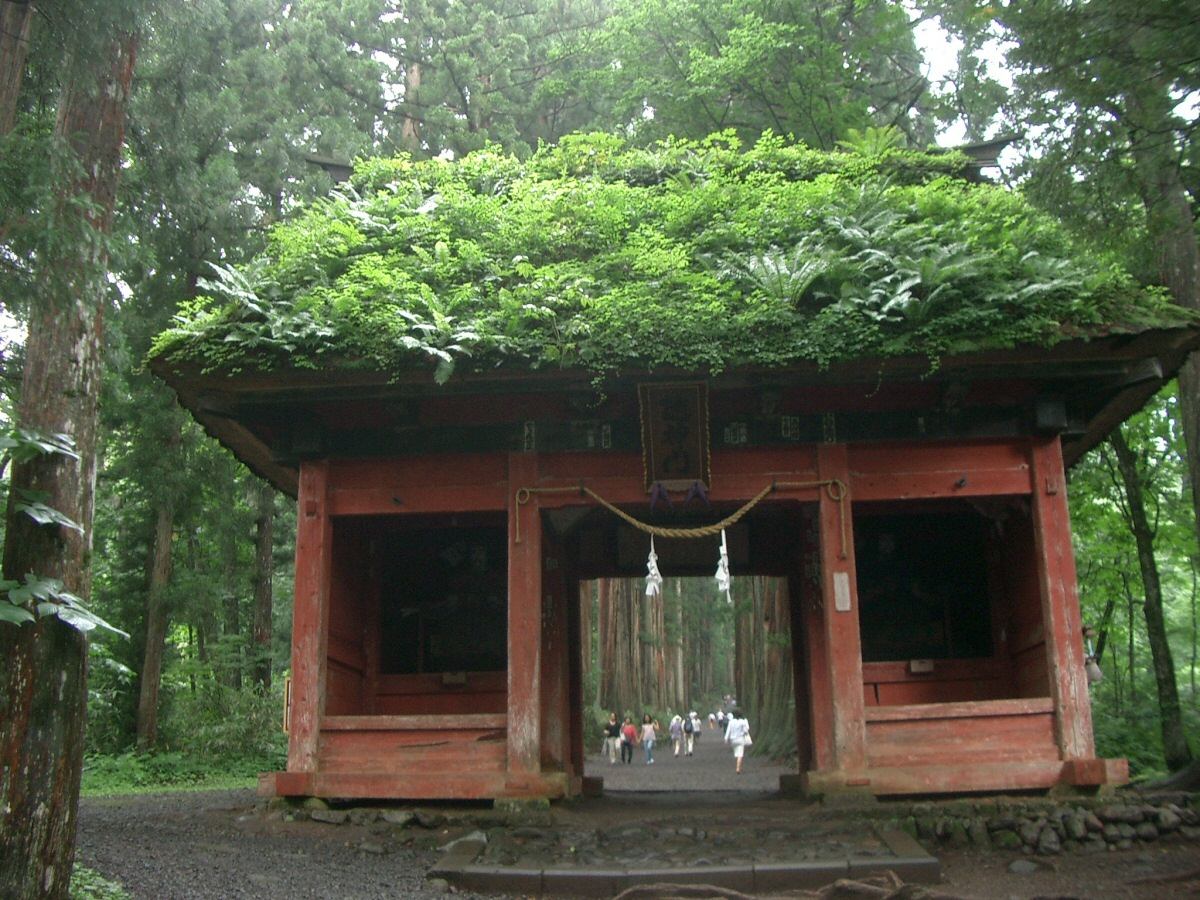
Route to Togakushi Shrine

- Zenkō-ji Buddhist temple and pilgrimage destination, that was established in its current location in the middle of the 7th century.
- Togakushi Shrine, a complex of five Shinto shrines, in the mountains above Nagano, whose uppermost shrine is approached via a path of more than 300 Cryptomeria trees.
- Saikou-ji, a Jōdo-shū (Jōdo Buddhism) temple, approximately 1 kilometer west of Zenkō-ji.
- Miwa Shrine, likely started in the 9th century, is located near Hongō Station.
- Yushimatenmangu Shrine in Wakaho is a branch of Yushima Tenman-gū which is located in Bunkyō, Tokyo.

=== Historical sites ===
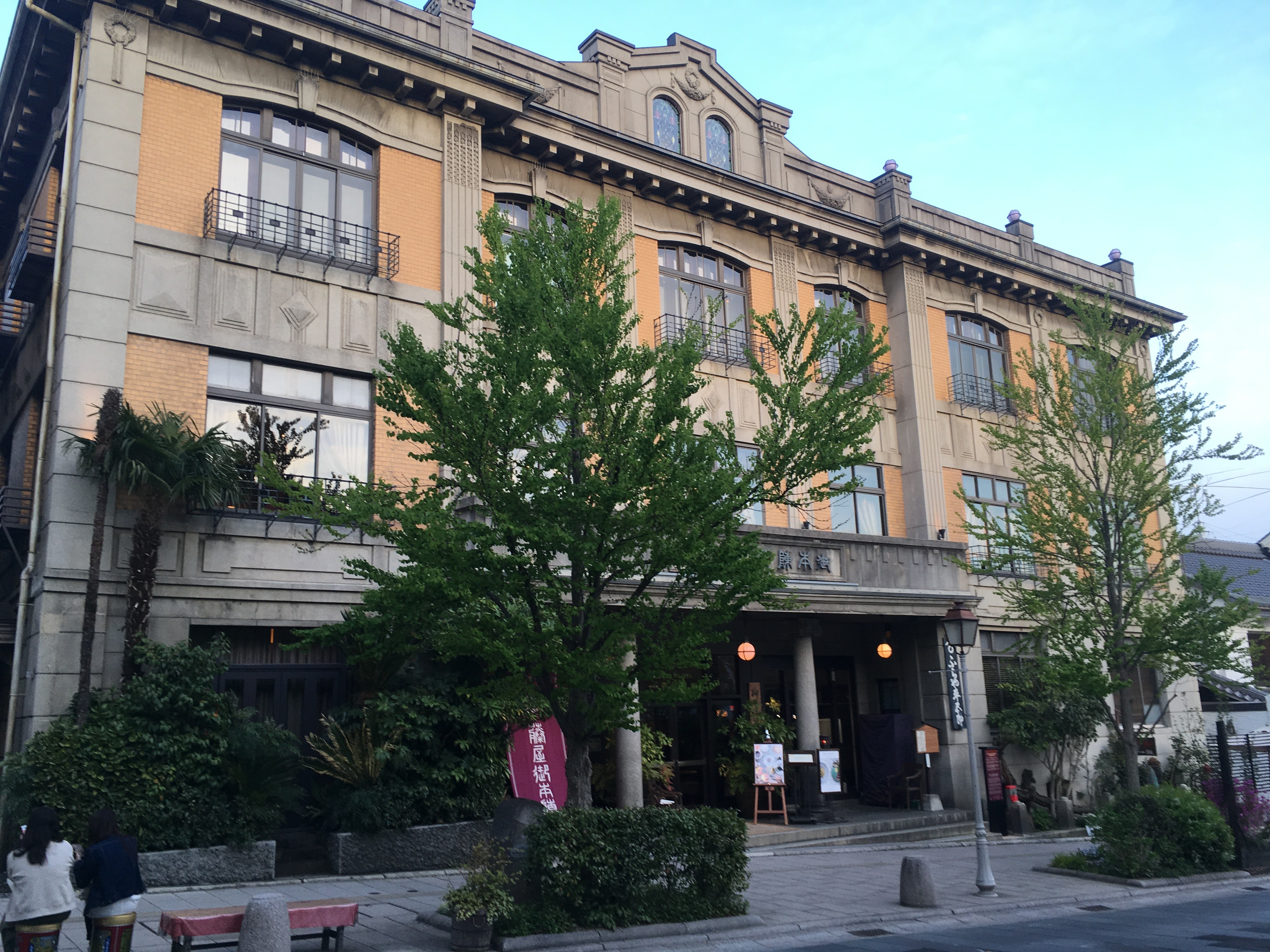
The Taishō era the Fujiya Gohonjin Hotel and Restaurant (built in 1925) in Daimon-cho.

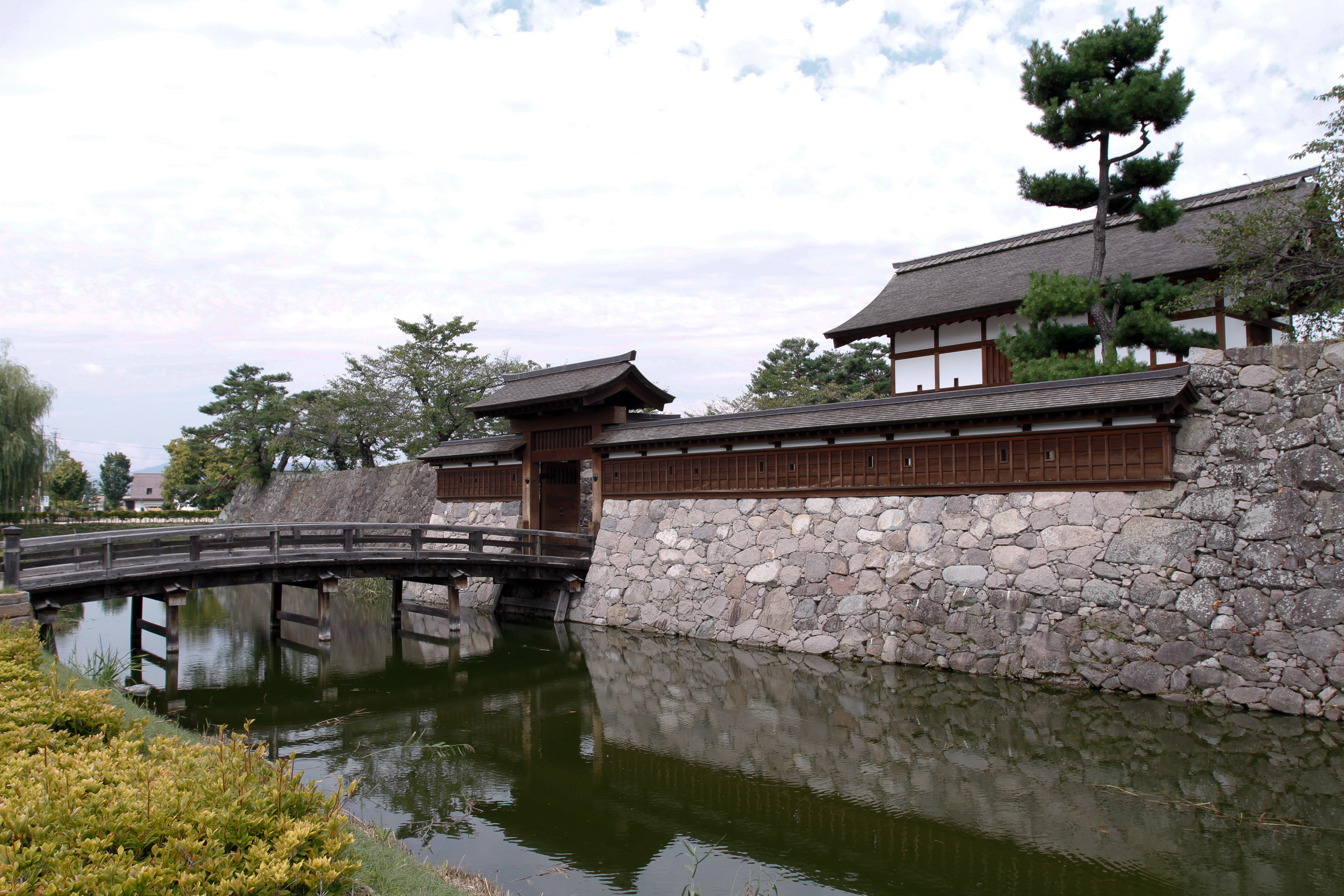
Matsushiro Castle moats and reconstructed gate

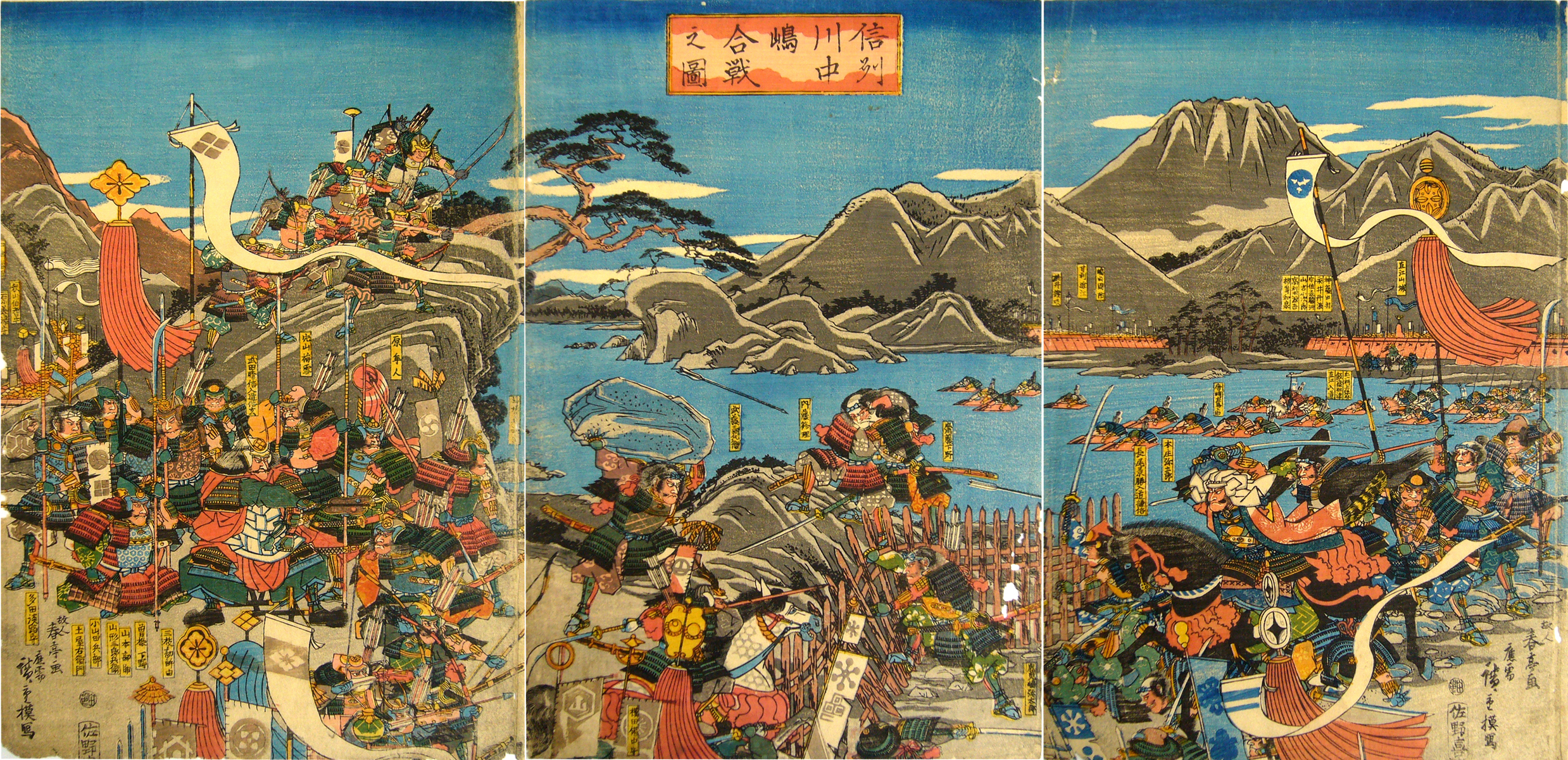
The Battle of Kawanakajima - Takeda Shingen on the left and Uesugi Kenshin on the right

- Monzenmachi is the surrounding area in front of the gate leading to Zenkō-ji. The area has historical buildings, lodgings, shops, and restaurants.
  - Zenkoji Nakamise-dori Street, a stone-paved street extending from Niomon Gate of Zenkoji, has many local shops.
  - Daimon-cho, old merchant houses from the Taisho era, with stone lanterns and large pavement stones
  - Patio Daimon, a commercial complex, that opened in 2017, that was established by renovating old warehouses and merchant houses.
- Matsushiro Castle, with its surrounding castle town, preserves many samurai residences, temples, and gardens of the Edo period.
  - Chokokuji Temple, the Sanada clan family temple, with the ancestral tomb of Sanada Nobuyuki, is an important cultural property.
  - The Bunbu School (Matsushiro Literary and Military School) is a National Historic Site located next to Matsushiro Castle
  - The Matsushiro Clan Sanada Jumangoku Festival, in mid-October, is a recreation of a 16th-century procession and performance.
  - Nearby is the former residence of the Yokota family, a middle-class samurai, with a minka (thatched-roof) and garden with seasonal flowers.
  - Also nearby is the Sakuma Zozan Shrine. Zozan was a 19th Japanese scholar, scientist, and linguist who advocated the opening up of Japan. In 1864, Zozan was assassinated by Kawakami Gensai, one of the most famous assassins of the Bakumatsu period, as Zozan was on return from Kyoto on a failed visit to see Emperor Kōmei to seek the opening of Japanese ports. Zozan, "a driving force in pioneering a new age", inspires the University of Nagano "to act as a source for regional revitalization and reinvigoration and as a base for knowledge that will activate industry, culture, and lifestyles in Nagano".
  - Matsushiro Underground Imperial Headquarters (松代大本営跡 Matsushiro Daihon'ei Ato) was a large underground bunker complex built during the Second World War, constructed so that the central organs of government of Imperial Japan could be transferred there. Construction began in November 1944 and continued until Japan's surrender on August 15, 1945. Between 7,000 and 10,000 Korean slave laborers were used to build the complex, and it is estimated that 1,500 of them died.
- Kawanakajima Battlefields, located in the southern section of present-day Nagano City, is where a series of 16th century battles occurred between Takeda Shingen and Uesugi Kenshin during the warring Sengoku period.
  - The Nagano City Museum is here.
  - Also nearby is the Tenku-ji Temple, where prayers are offered for war dead of the Kawanakajima battles. This temple is the family temple of Shingen's brother, Nobushige, who died in 1561 in one of the battles. Included at the temple is a 5-meter statue of the ruler of the underworld in Buddhist mythology, King Enma (閻魔王, Enma-ō).

=== Other sites ===
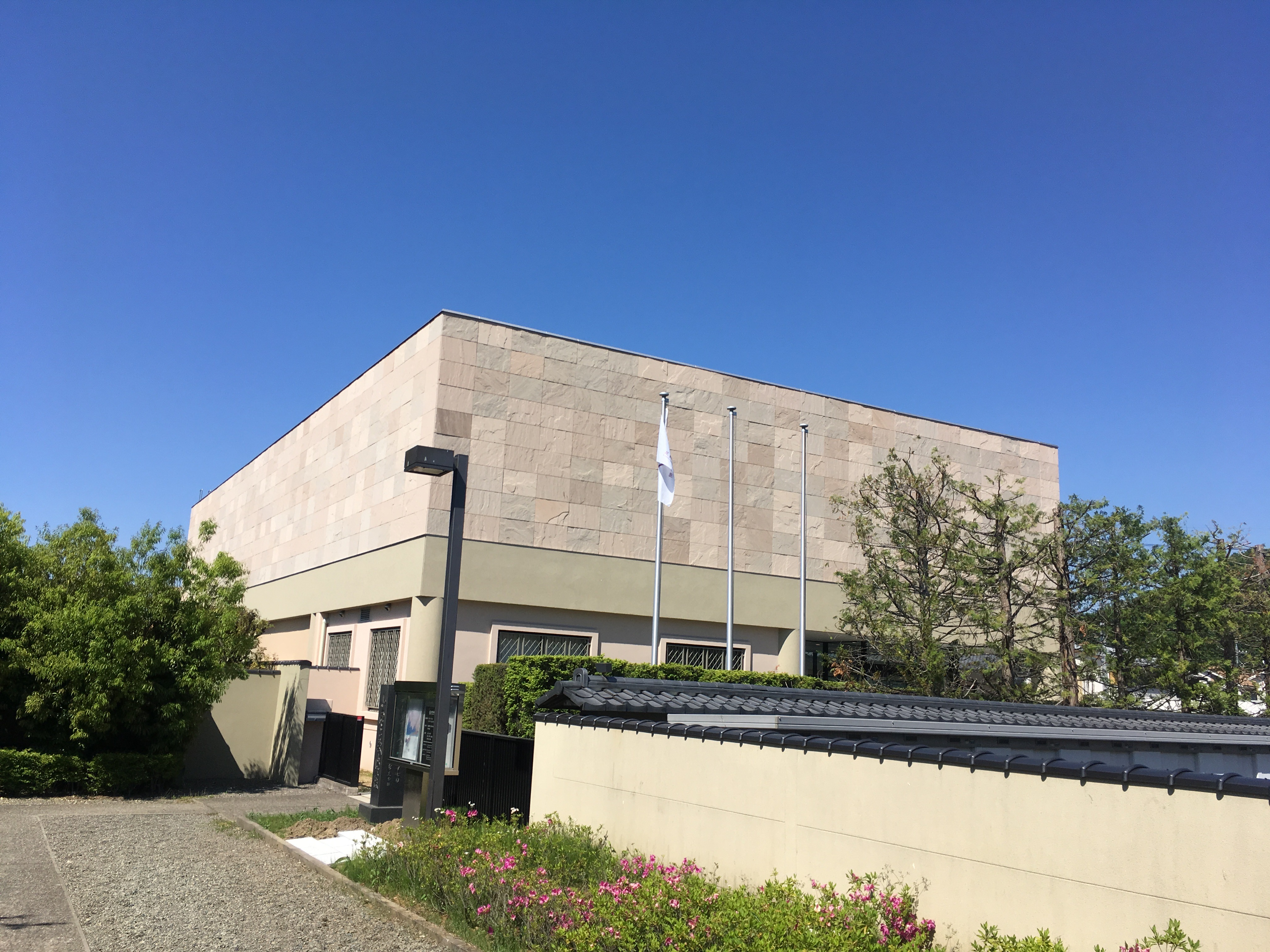
Kitano Museum of Art

- Nagano Prefectural Shinano Art Museum / Higashiyama Kaii Gallery is located 100m from Zenkō-ji.
- Nagano Prefectural Art Museum
- Mizuno Museum of Art
- Kitano Museum of Art is an important regional art museum located in the Wakaho district of Nagano City, located approximately 7.5 km southeast of Nagano Station. Its collection of art includes works by:
  - (Japanese): Takeuchi Seihō, Uemura Shōen, Kanzan Shimomura, Hishida Shunsō, Gyoshū Hayami, Kiyokata Kaburagi, Shinsui Itō
  - (Western): Pierre-Auguste Renoir, Pablo Picasso, Tsuguharu Foujita, Armand Guillaumin, Henri-Edmond Cross, Marc Chagall, Pierre Bonnard, Bernard Buffet, Emilio Greco, and Auguste Rodin.
- Chibikko Ninja-mura (Kids Ninja Village), Togakushi, from late April to late November.
- Sporting venues built for the Winter Olympics including the M-Wave speed skating arena (with the world's largest wooden suspension roof), Big Hat arena, and the Aqua Wing Arena.
- The Ōmuro Kofun group and the Senryū-Shōgunzuka Kofun - Himezuka Kofun are two groups of Kofun period burial mounds located outside the city. Both are National Historic Sites.

== Culture ==
=== Events ===
- Nagano Tomyo Festival is a light and lantern festival held every February to commemorate the 1998 Winter Olympics.
- Nagano Olympic Commemorative Marathon, an IAAF Bronze Label Road Race, takes place in mid-April.
- Hanami - cherry blossom viewing - in Joyama Park behind Zenkō-ji is possible from mid-to-late April.
- Nagano Floral Festa Zenkoji Temple - flowers and flower art at Nagano Station and Omotesando - held in early May to welcome spring.
- Buckwheat blossom viewing, from mid-July to mid-September, Togakushi
- The Kijo ("Ogress") Momoji Festival held in mid-October in Iizuna, which celebrates this woman and the beauty of nature.
- The Togakushi Soba Festival, held in early November.
- Yoi Ebisu and Ebisuko Fireworks display, dedicated to the god of fortune, Ebisu held in late November.

=== Sports ===
- Nagano Sports Park is a municipal and prefectural sporting ground that includes the Aqua Wing Arena, Nagano Athletic Stadium, tennis courts, a baseball stadium, and a gymnasium. The sports park is accessible by Bus 7 from Nagano Station, or a 15-minute walk from Asahi Station on the Nagano Electric Railway.
- AC Nagano Parceiro is a Japanese football club based in Nagano that represents Nagano in J3 League.
- AC Nagano Parceiro Ladies, based in Nagano, is a women's football team that currently plays in the Nadeshiko League 1, the highest division of women's football in Japan.
- Shinshu Brave Warriors is a professional basketball team that competes in the second division of the Japanese B.League.
- Shinano Grandserows are an independent minor baseball team that plays in the Baseball Challenge League (Route Inn BCL) in Nagano City, at the Nagano Olympic Stadium.
- Boaluz Nagano are a futsal team in the F. League. They play at the White Ring (arena).
- Nagano City Gliding Field, which opened in 1974, is located in the Wakaho district of Nagano City along the Chikuma River.

Club	Sport	League	Venue	Established
AC Nagano Parceiro	Soccer	J.League	Minami Nagano Sports Park Stadium	1990
AC Nagano Parceiro Ladies	Soccer	WE.League	Minami Nagano Sports Park Stadium	2000
Shinano Grandserows	Baseball	BC.League	Nagano Olympic Stadium	2006
Boaluz Nagano	Futsal	F.League	White Ring	2011
Shinshu Brave Warriors	Basketball	B.League	White Ring	2011

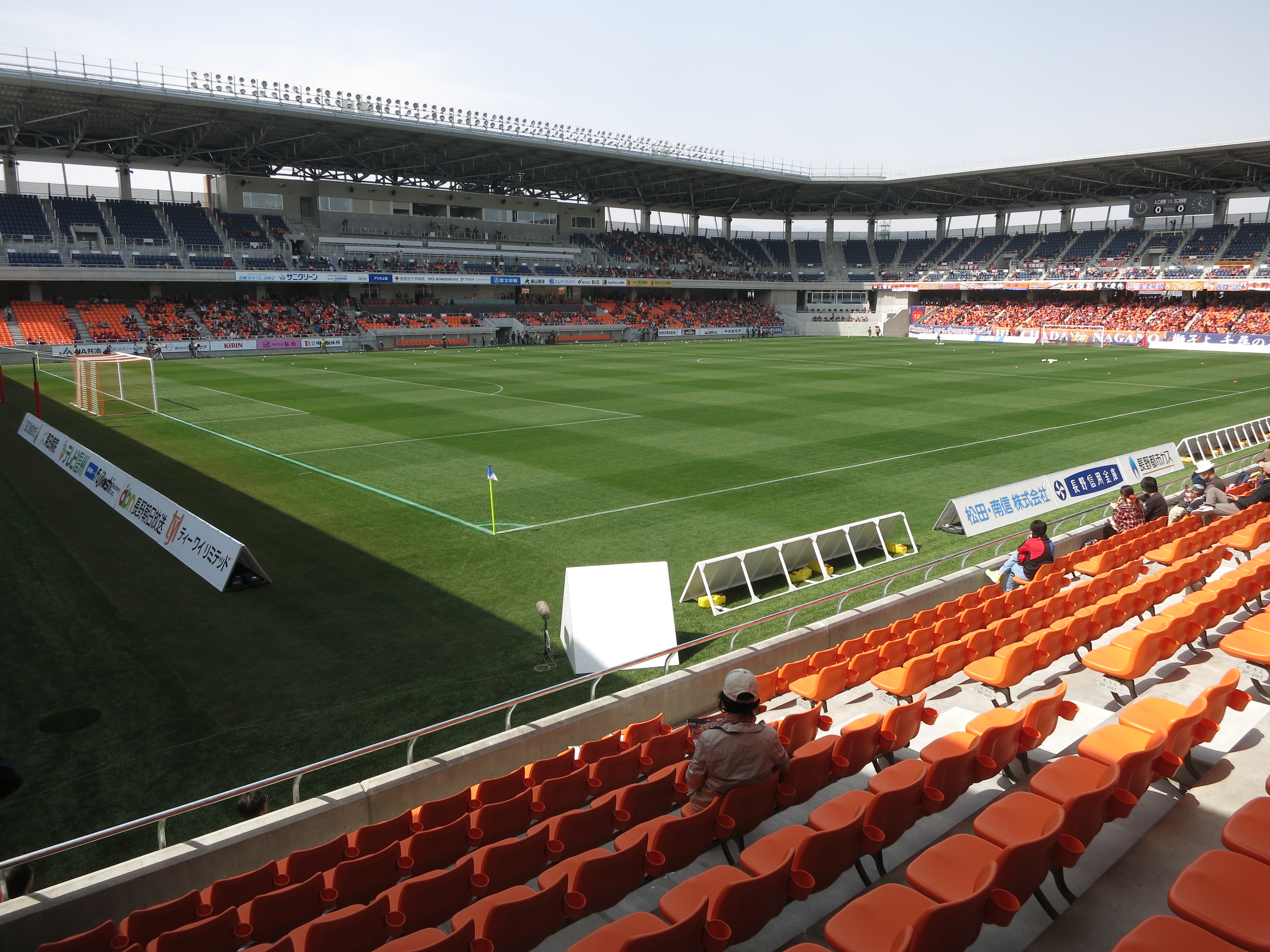
Minami Nagano Sports Park Stadium

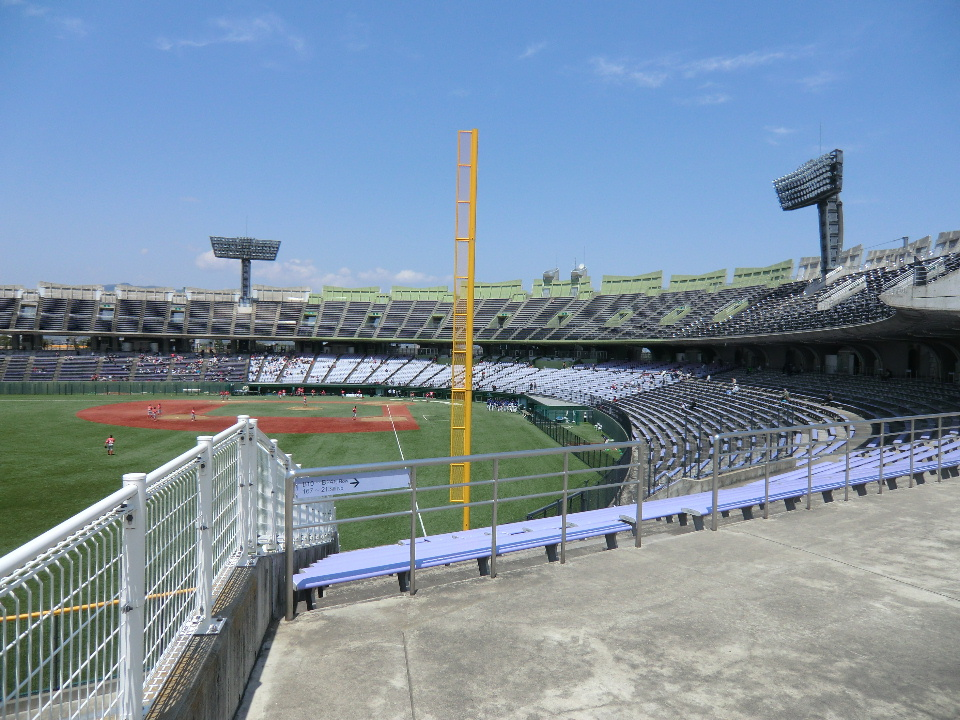
Nagano Olympic Stadium

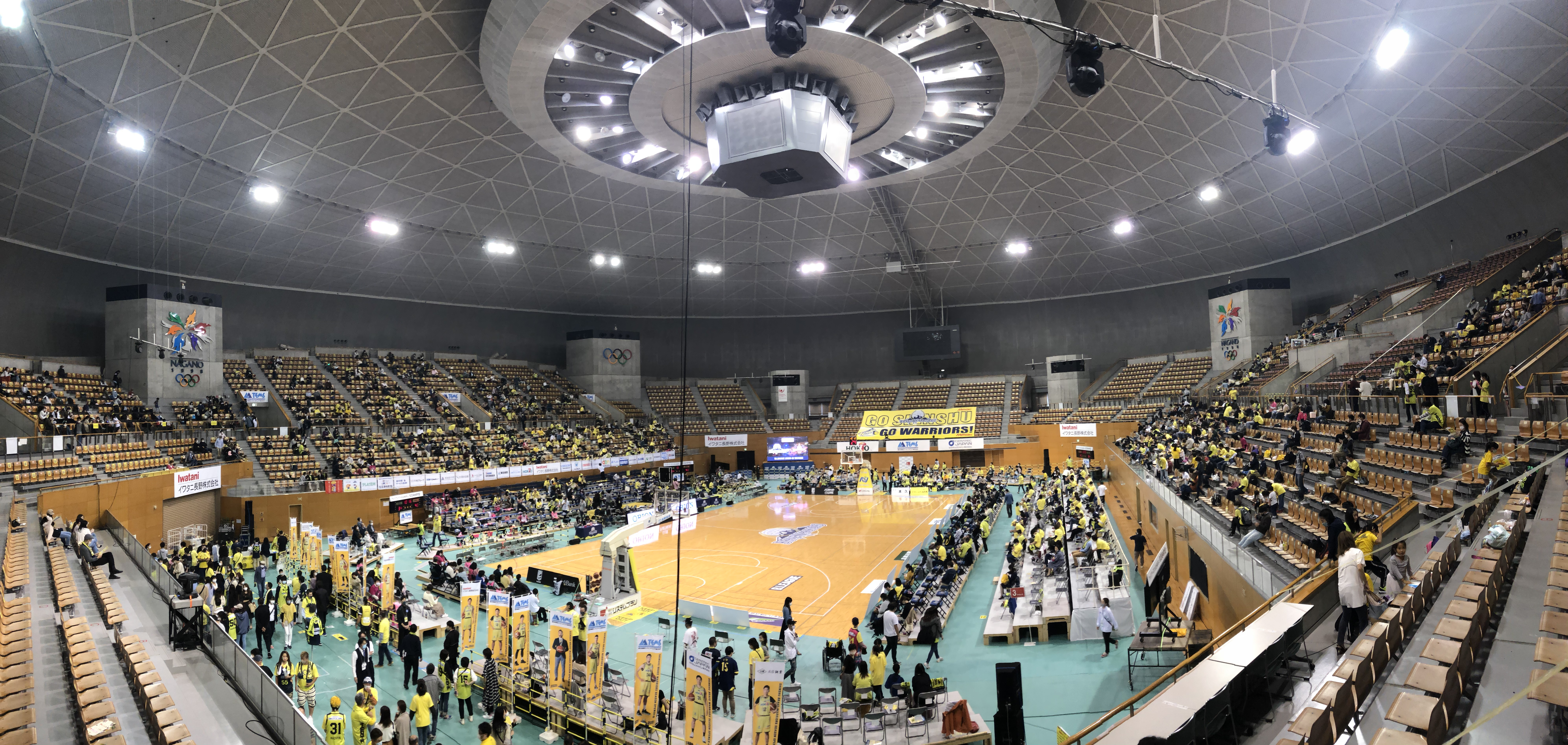
White Ring

== Notable people from Nagano ==
- Takeru Kobayashi, competitive eater
- Yuto Adachi, member of K-pop boy band Pentagon
- Yoko Aki, songwriter, actress, novelist and essayist
- Kazuo Aoki, politician
- Eita, professional wrestler
- Joe Hisaishi, composer
- Haruyo Ichikawa, actress
- Toshimi Kitazawa, politician
- Kenji Kosaka, politician
- Kiyoshige Koyama, composer
- Isao Kuraishi, actor
- Tadamichi Kuribayashi, general, Imperial Japanese Army
- Hiro Mashima, manga artist and author of Fairy Tail
- Saki Minemura, professional volleyball athlete
- Emi Nitta, voice actress
- Harua Shigeta, member of J-pop group &Team
- Shusei Tanaka, politician
- Rika Tatsumi, professional wrestler
- Junichi Kakizaki, flower artist

== Gallery ==
Nagano (city)
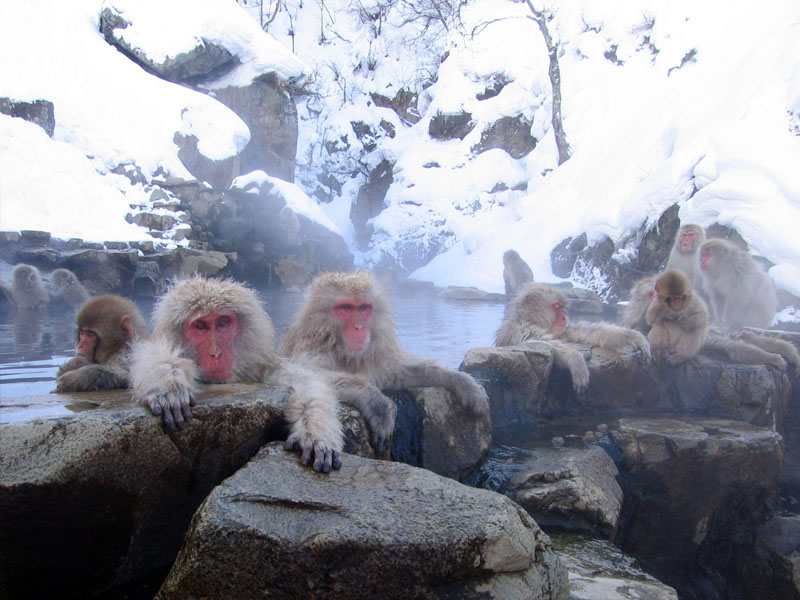
Japanese macaque at Jigokudani hotspring

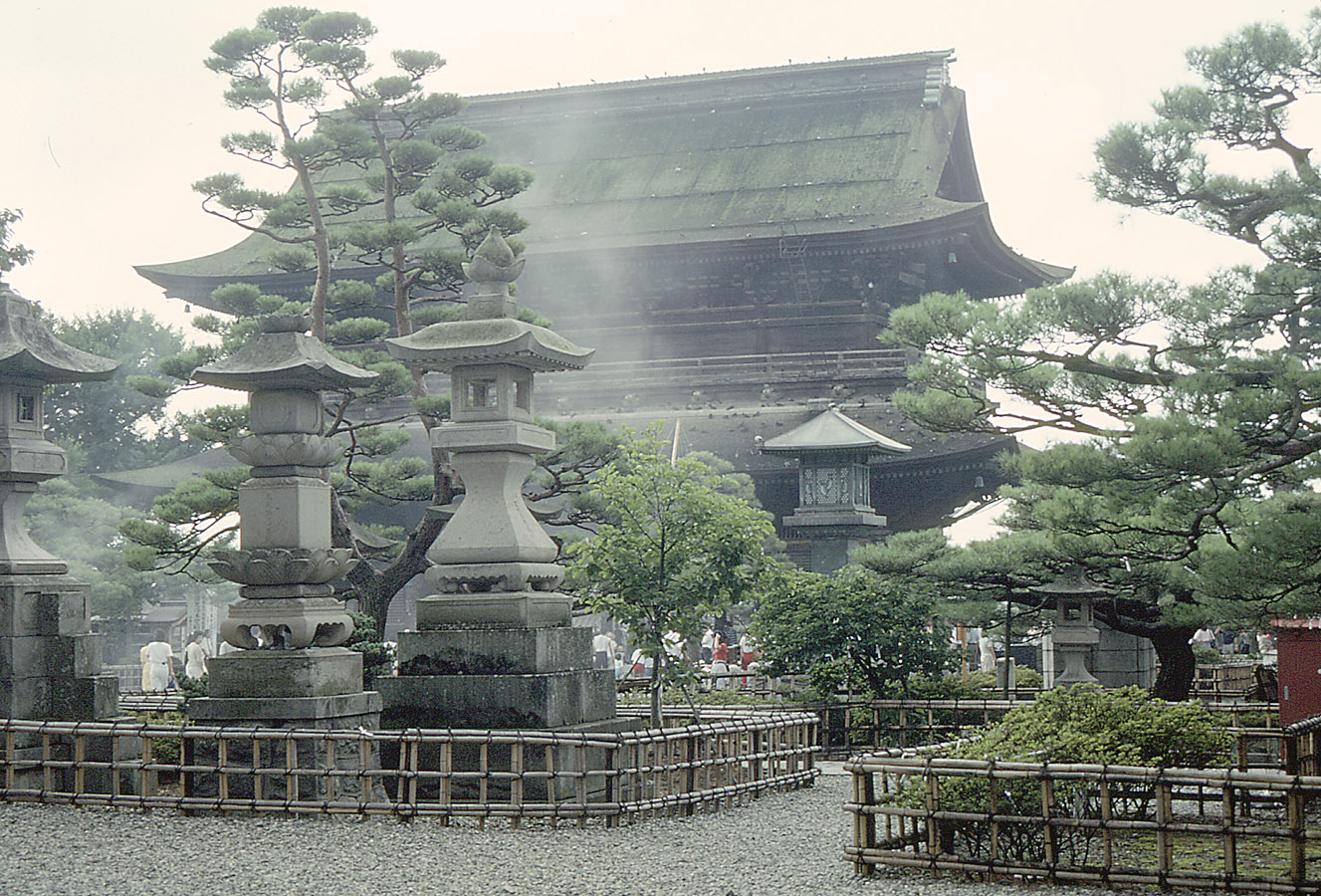
Zenkō-ji

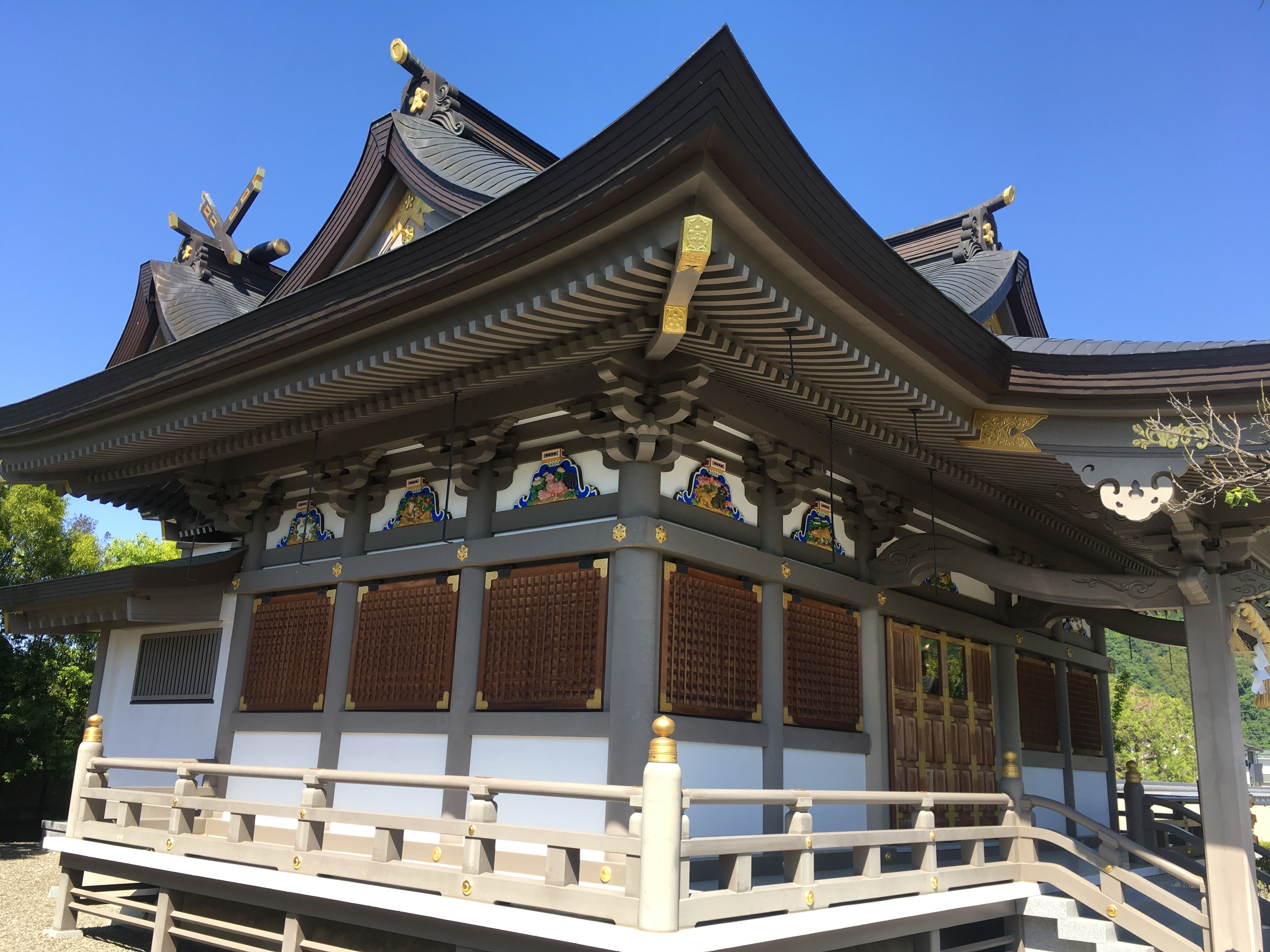
Yushimatennmangu

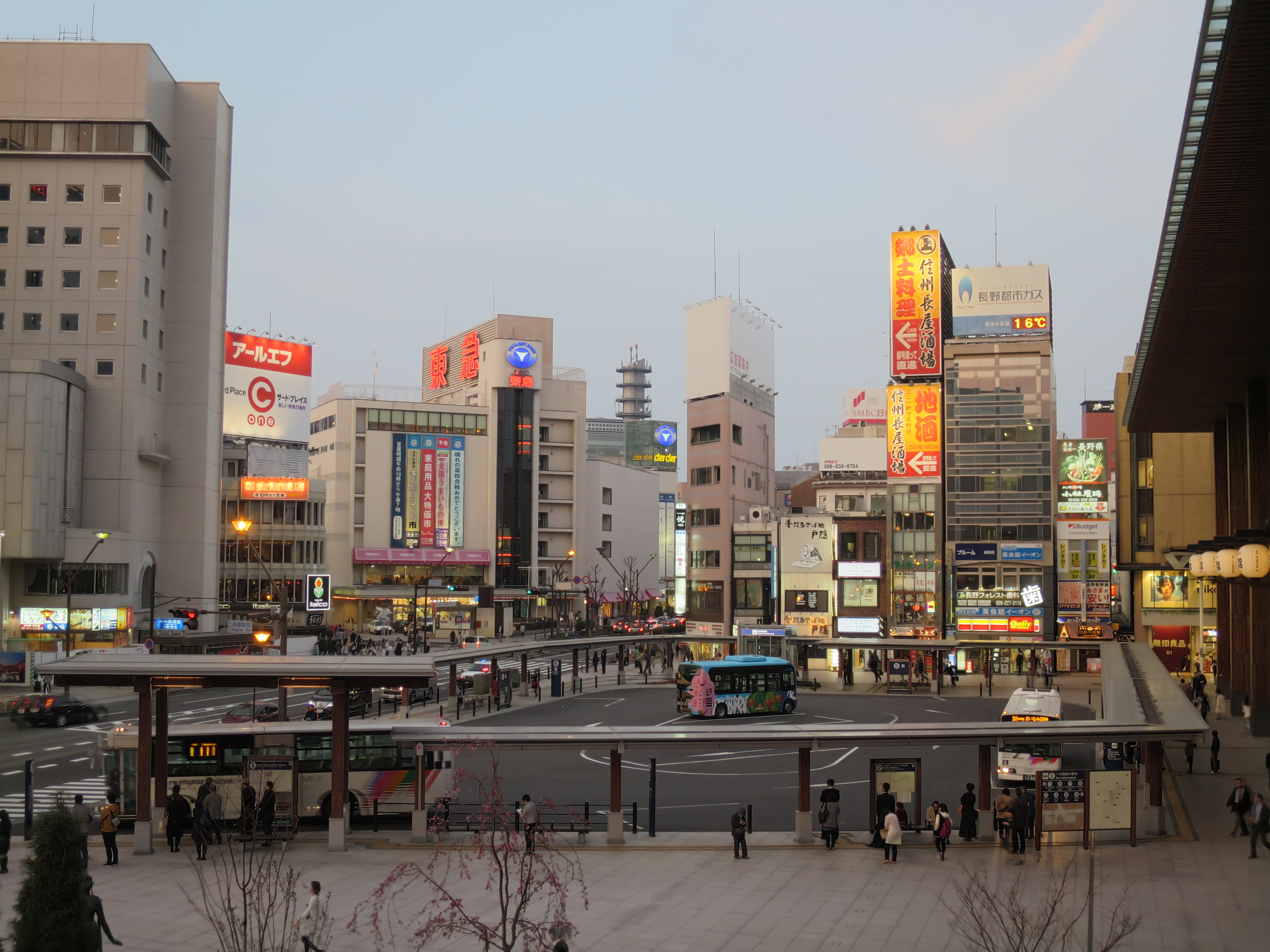
Downtown Nagano

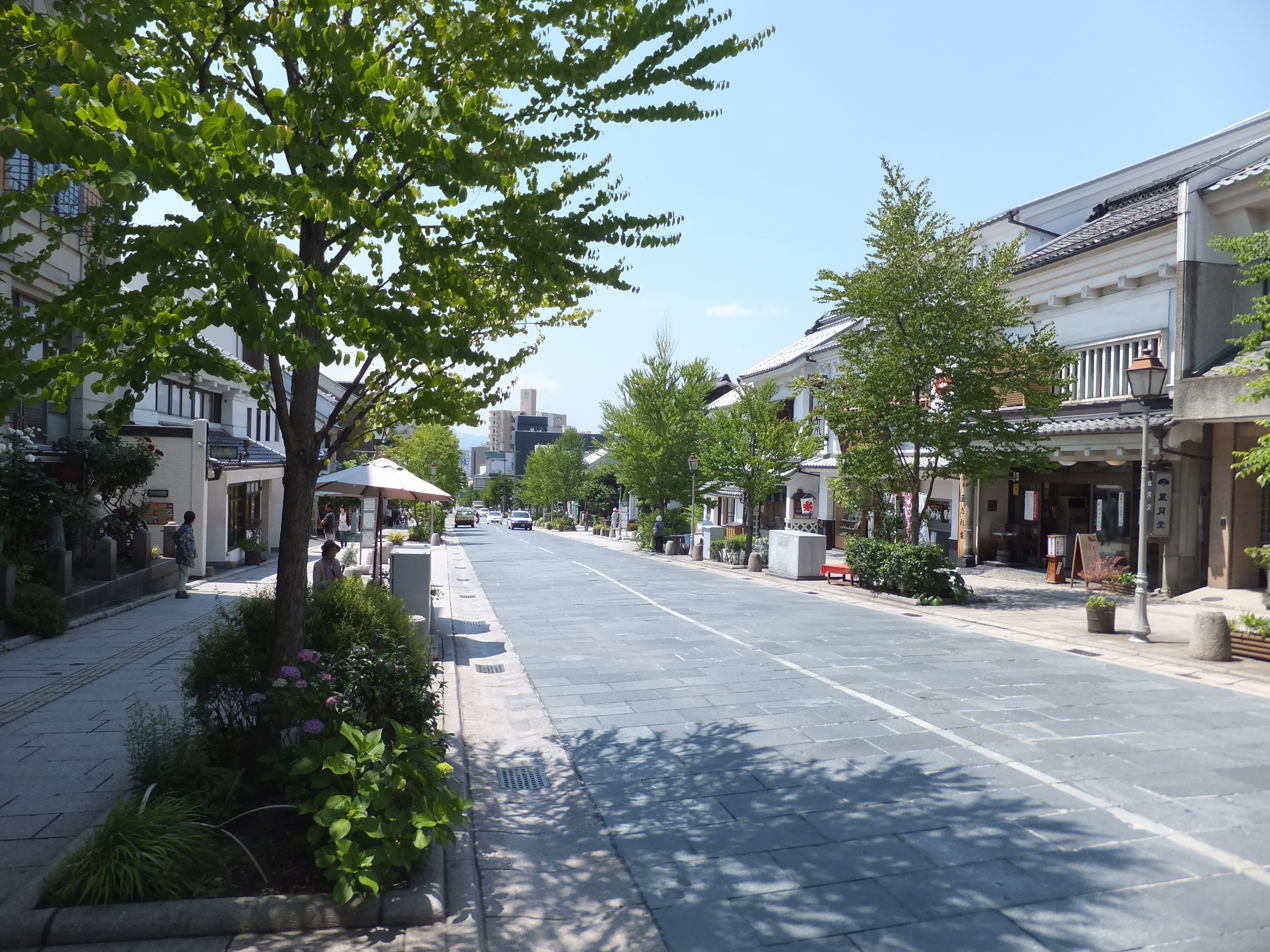
Daimon-cho

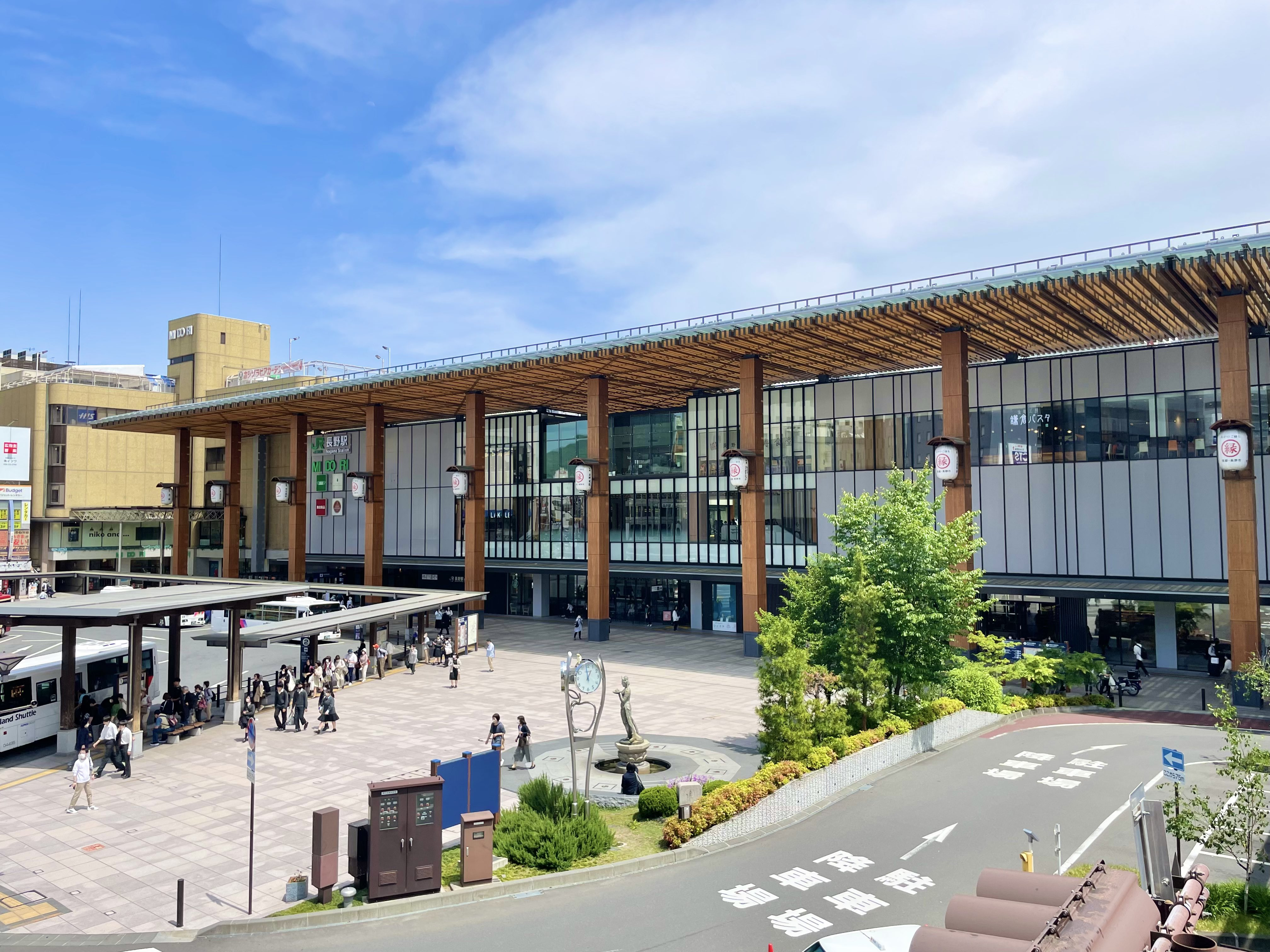
Nagano Station, Zenkō-ji Entrance

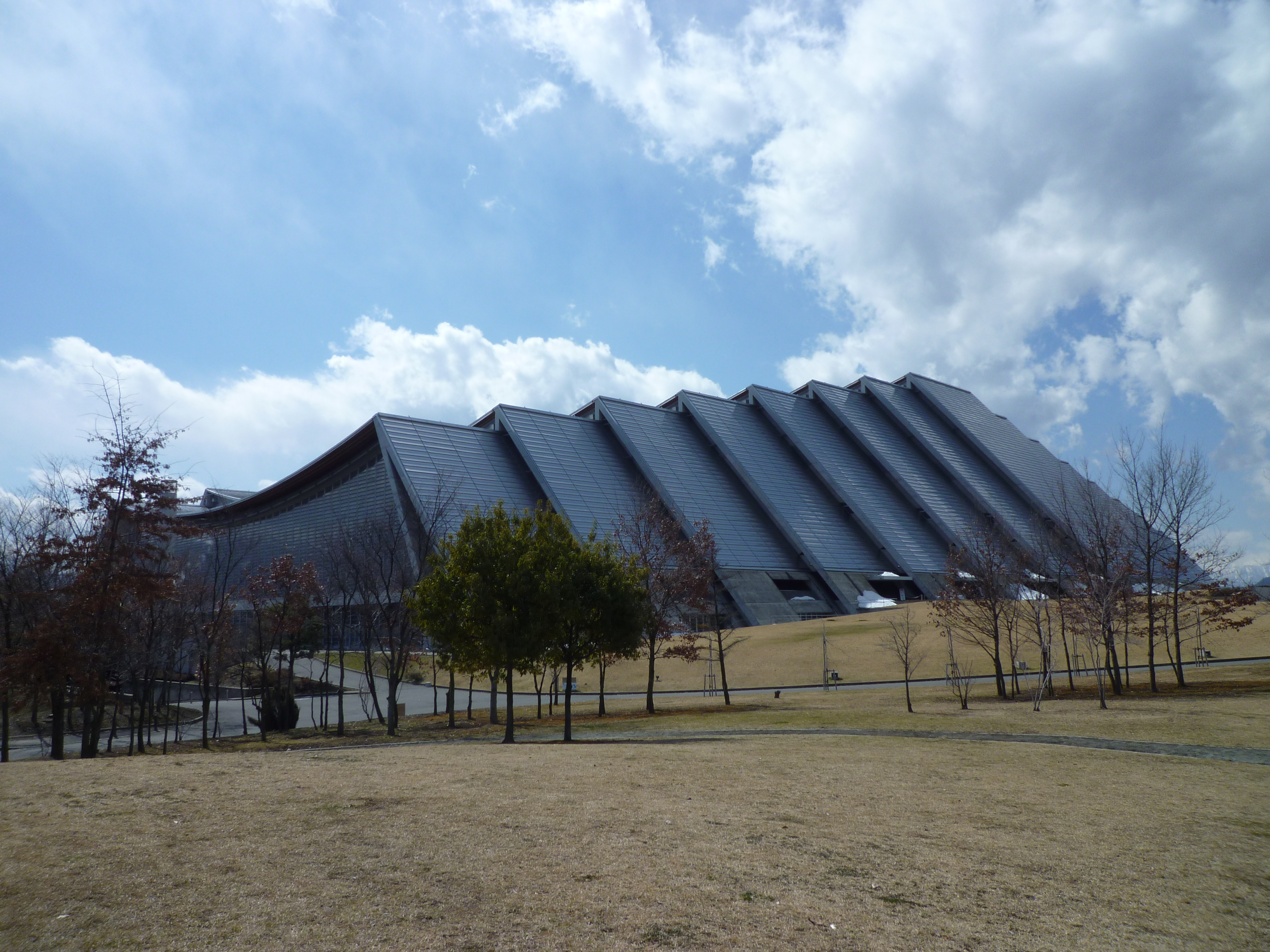
M-Wave arena

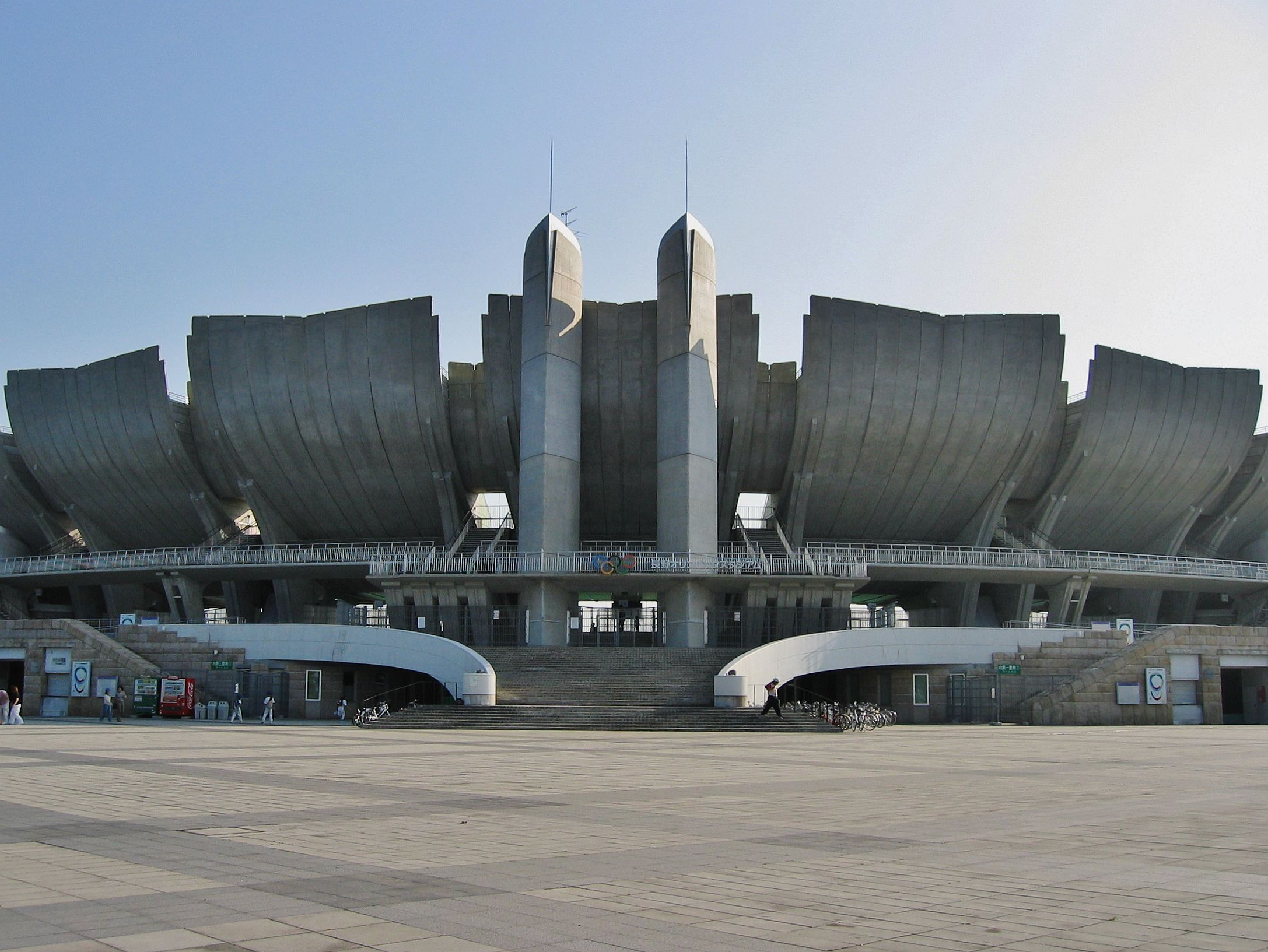
Nagano Olympic Stadium (Nagano Baseball Stadium)

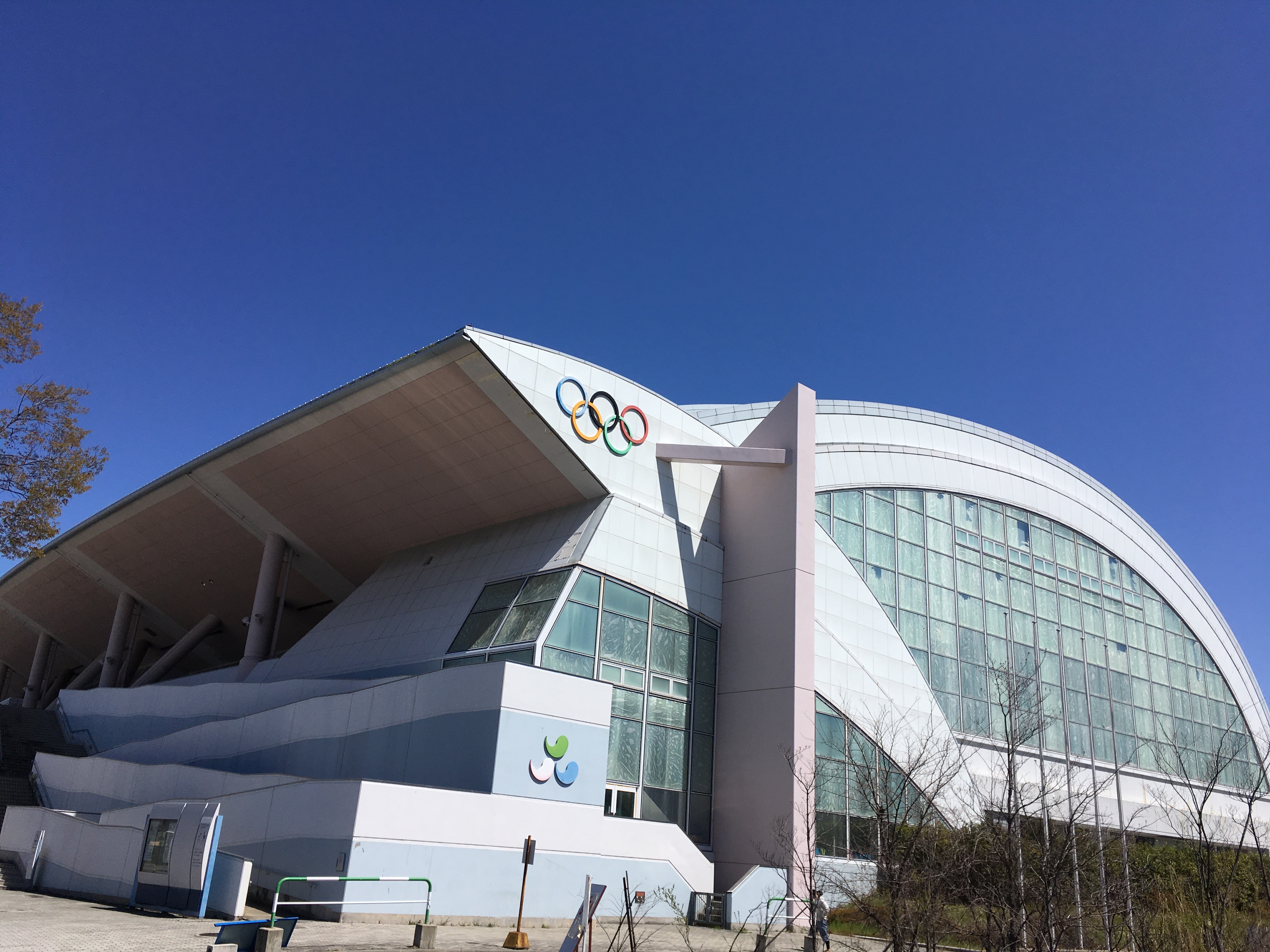
Aqua Wing Arena

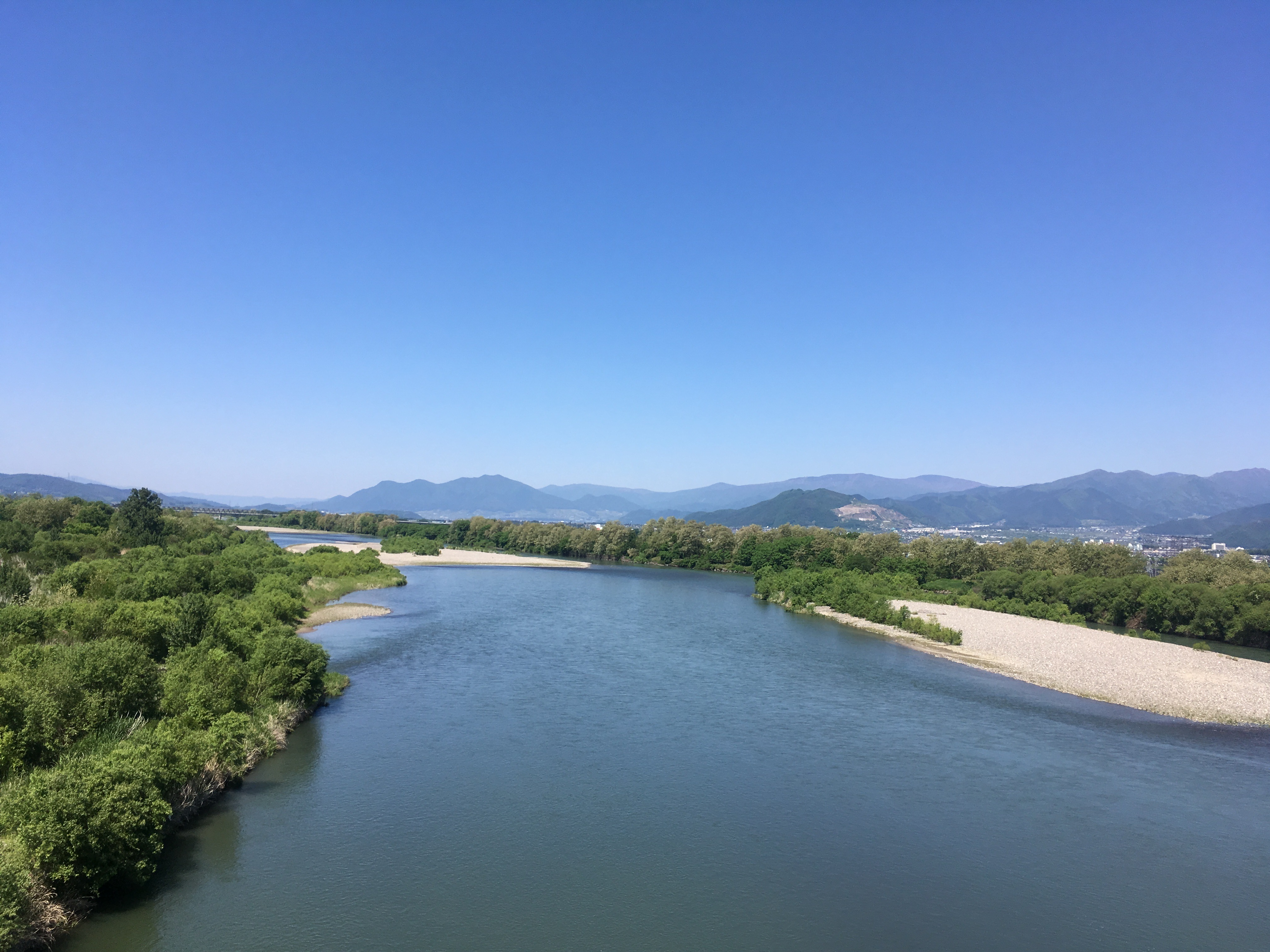
Chikuma River, from Yashima Bridge

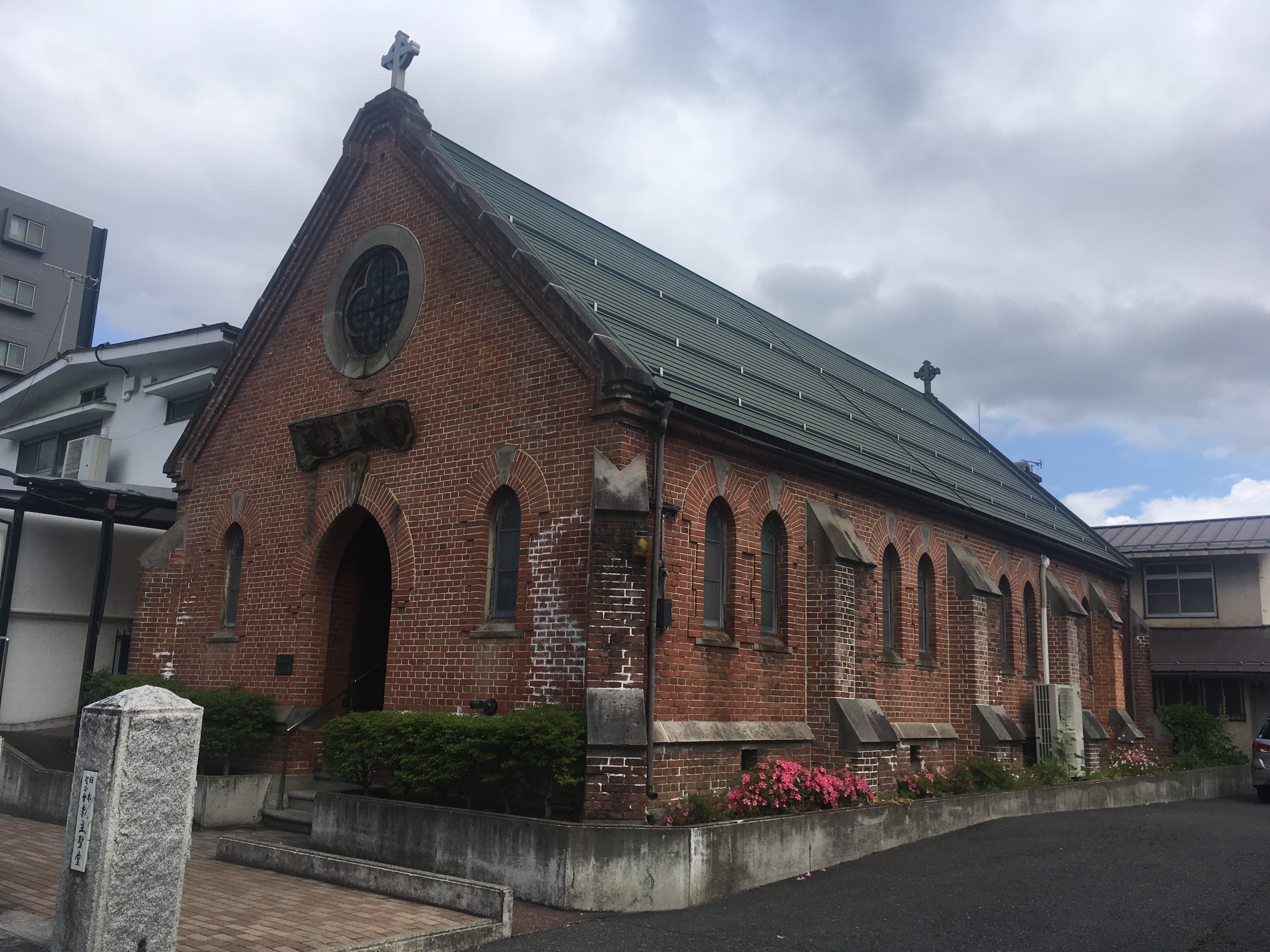
Nagano Holy Saviour (Anglican) Church (est. 1898), a nationally registered Tangible Cultural Property

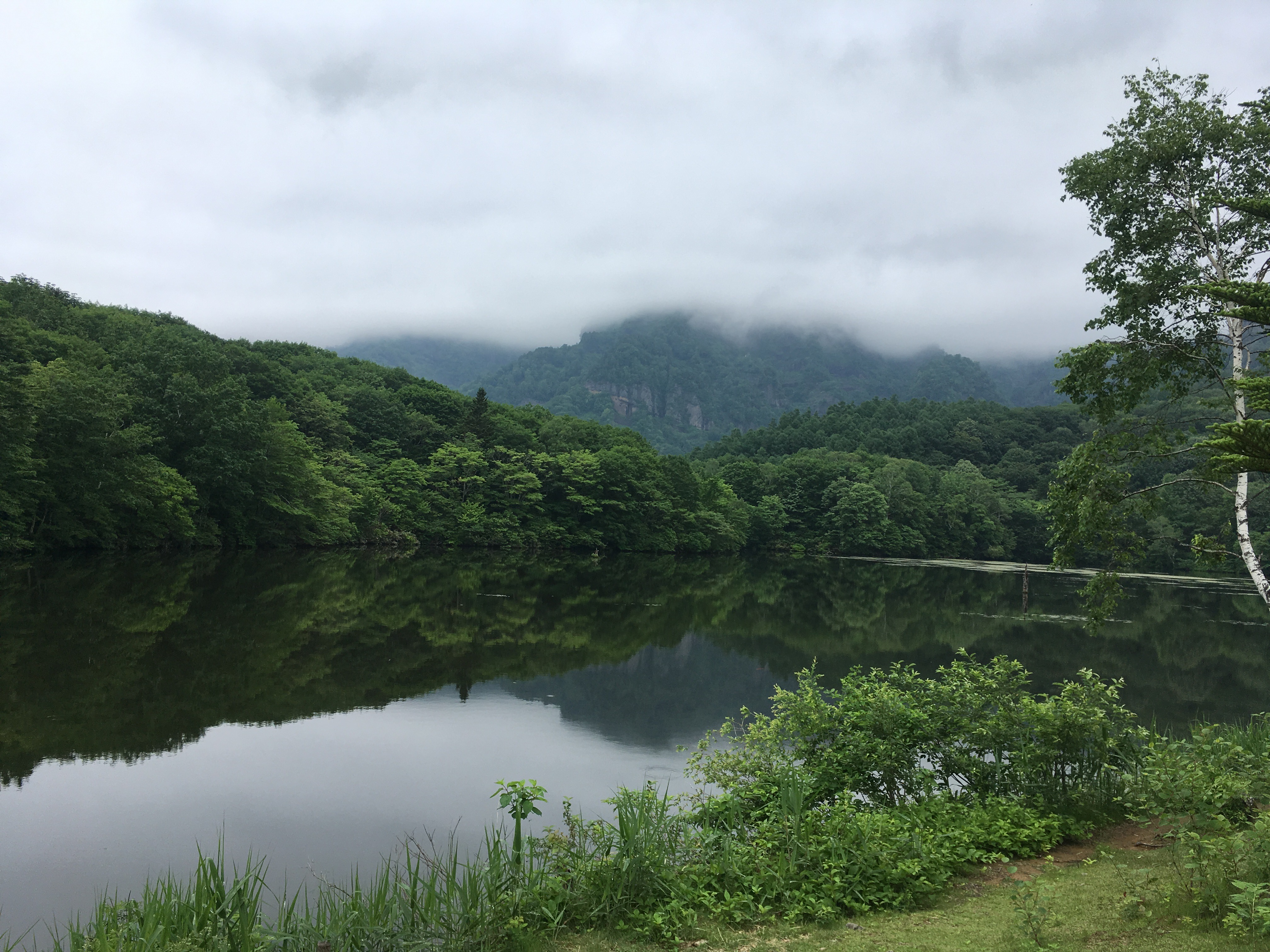
Kagami-ike Pond, in Togakushi, Nagano 2019

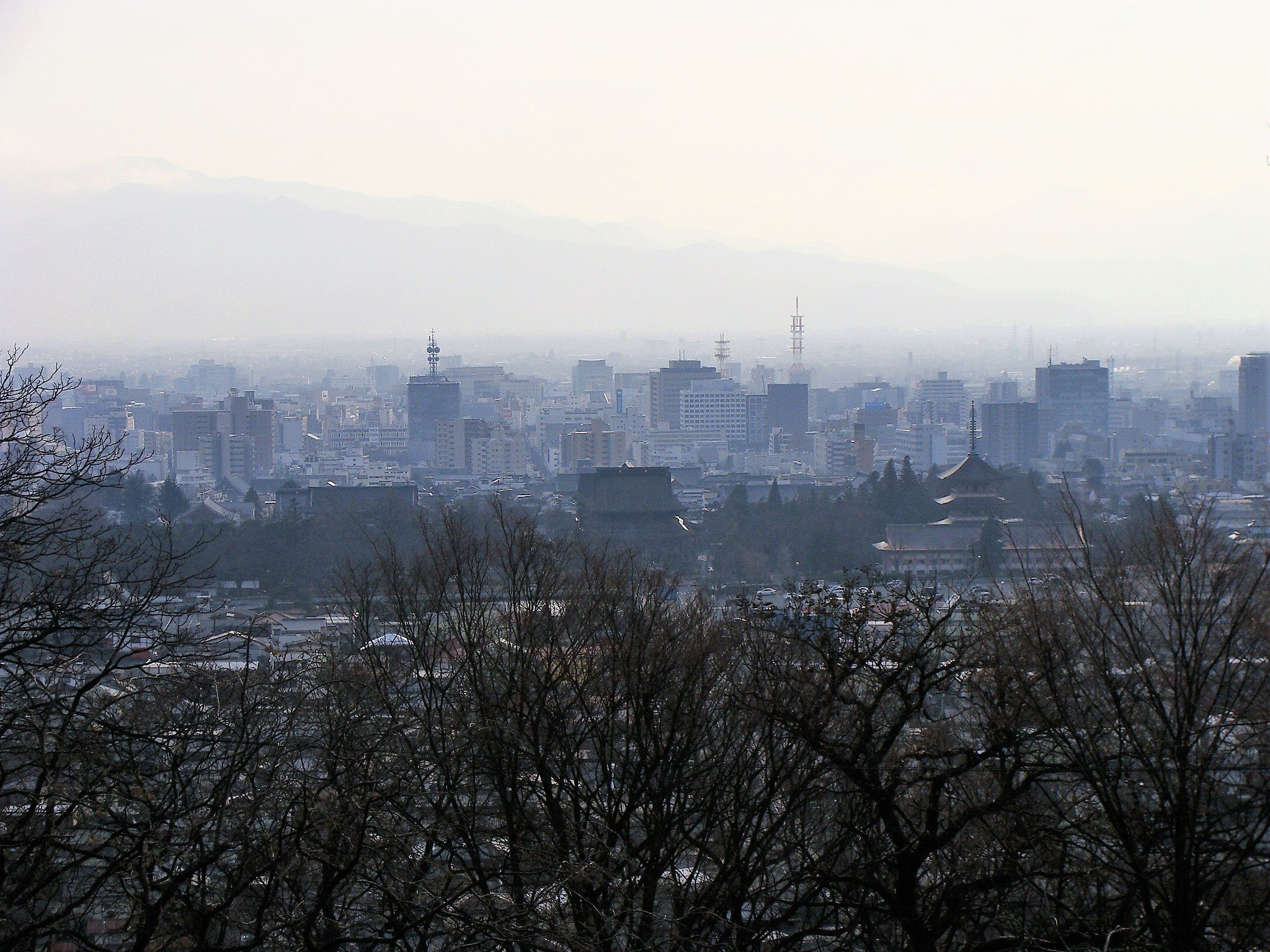
Skyline of Nagano City
