= Hongō Station (Nagano) =

Railway station in Nagano, Nagano Prefecture, Japan

Hongō Station 本郷駅
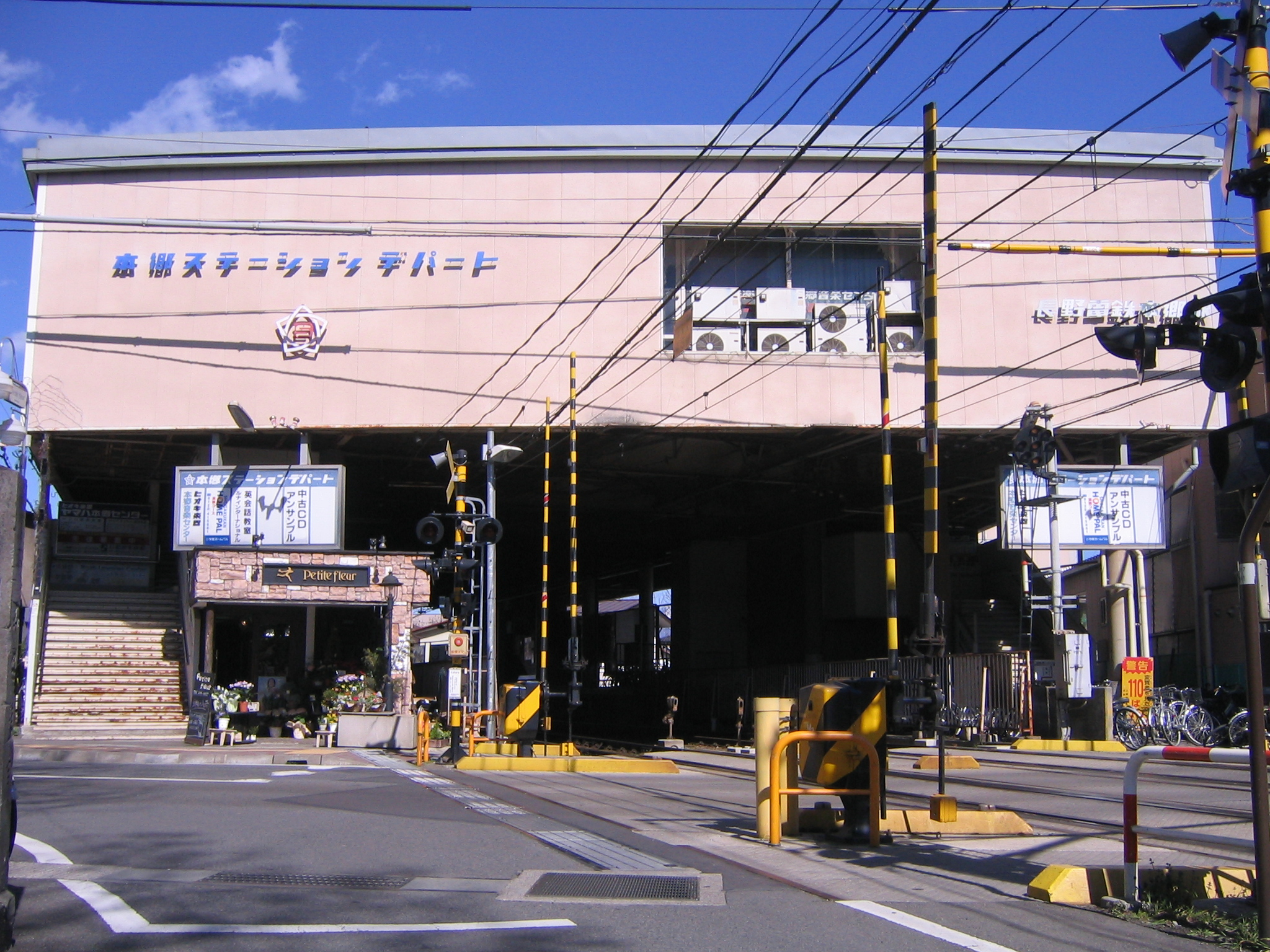
- Hongō Station in April 2007

General information
- Location: 3-15-9 Miwa, Nagano-shi, Nagano-ken 380-0803; Japan
- Coordinates: 36°39′45″N 138°12′14.0″E
- Operator: Nagano Electric Railway
- Line: ■ Nagano Electric Railway Nagano Line
- Distance: 2.7 km from Nagano
- Platforms: 2 side platforms
- Tracks: 2

Other information
- Station code: N5
- Website: Official website

History
- Opened: 28 June 1926

Passengers
- FY2016: 1385 daily
Location
- Location within Japan

Hongō Station (本郷駅, Hongō-eki) is a railway station in the northeastern part of city of Nagano, Japan, in area called Miwa (三輪). The station is operated by the private railway operating company Nagano Electric Railway (長野電鉄株式会社, Nagano dentetsu).

The station serves the University of Nagano (長野県立大学 Nagano Kenritsu Daigaku), Nagano Women's Junior College (長野女子短期大学 Nagano joshi tanki daigaku), Nagano School for the Deaf (長野県長野ろう学校 Naganoken Nagano rou gakkou), Nagano Prefectural, Nagano Senior High School (長野県長野高等学校 Naganoken Nagano koutou gakkou), and Nagano Girls Senior High School (長野女子高等学校 Nagano joshi koutou gakkou).

== Lines ==
Hongō Station is a station on the Nagano Electric Railway Nagano Line.

It is 2.7 kilometers from the terminus of the line at Nagano Station and 30.5 kilometers from the opposite terminus at Yudanaka Station (湯田中駅, Yudanaka-eki). Hongō Station is 1.1 kilometers from Zenkōjishita Station (善光寺下駅 Zenkōjishita-eki) below Zenkō Temple (善光寺, Zenkō-ji]), a temple originally built in the 7th Century.

Between Hongo Station and Zenkōjishita Station, the train descends underground for the last 2.5 kilometers to Nagano Station. This underground section of the line was completed in 1981.

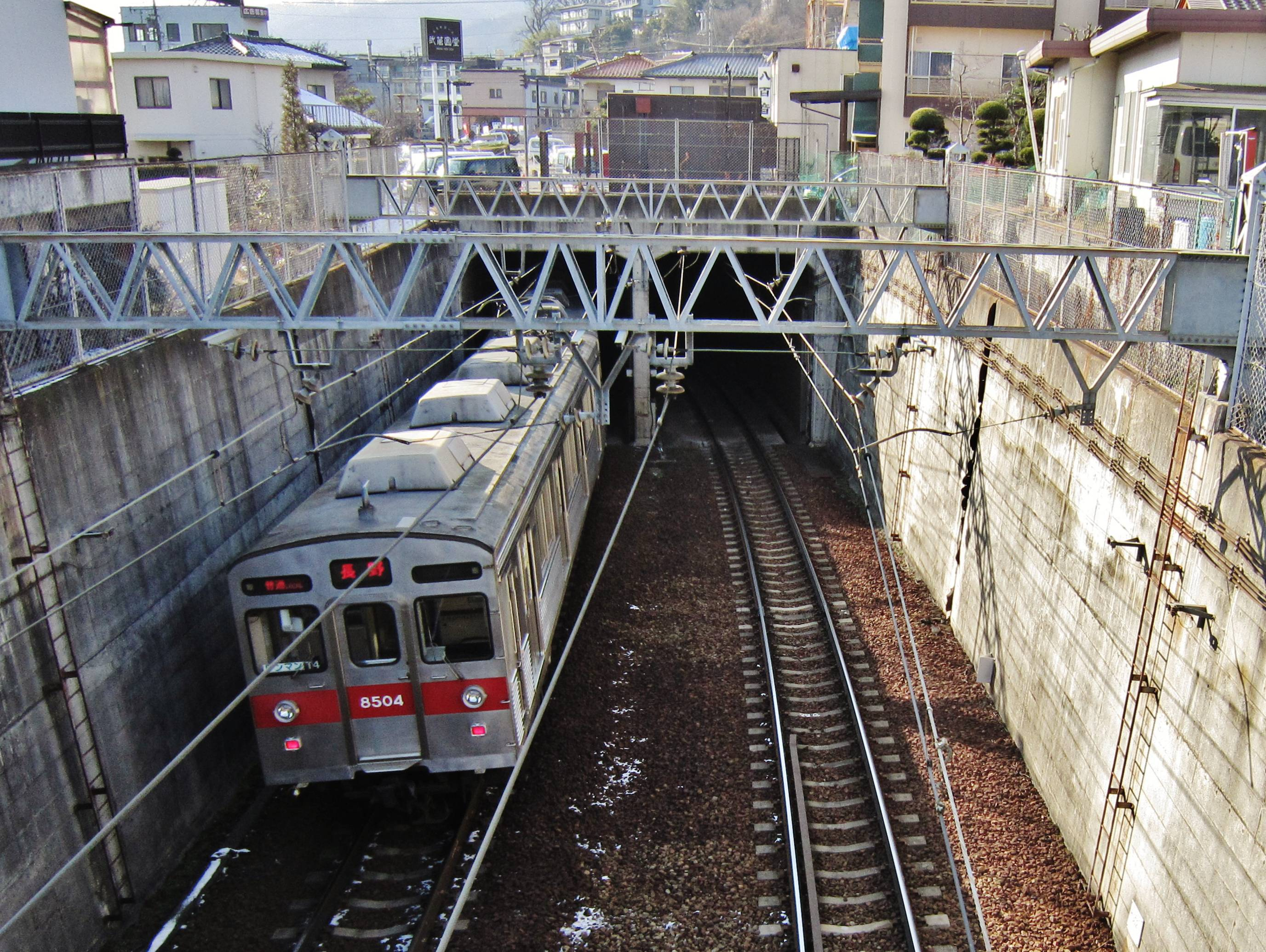
Nagano Electric Railway descends underground between Hongo and Zenkojishita

== Station layout ==
The station is a staffed station. The station consists of two opposed side platforms serving two tracks, with an elevated station building. There were two stairways to enter the elevated station building where the ticket gate was located. Beginning in November 2019, construction began to install the ticket gate at the ground level. Currently (January 2020), passengers enter on the ground level on the Yudanaka-bound platform.

Passengers arriving at the station show their tickets. Departing passengers do not need to show their tickets. The station does not have an automatic ticket gate.

A small selection of seasonal agricultural products are available for sale inside the ticket gate.

=== Platforms ===
1	■ Nagano Electric Railway Nagano Line	for Suzaka, Shinshū-Nakano and Yudanaka
2	■ Nagano Electric Railway Nagano Line	for Gondō and Nagano

== Adjacent stations ==
«	Service	»
Nagano Electric Railway
Express-A: Does not stop at this station
Gondō	Express-B	Shinano-Yoshida
Zenkōjishita	Local	Kirihara

== History ==
- The station opened on 28 June 1926.
- October, 1968, construction to enlarge the station began.
- March 29, 1969, the current station was completed. It included a small store, "Hongo Station Department". The new station was 31 times larger than the previous station.

== Passenger statistics ==
In fiscal 2017, the station was used by an average of 1379 passengers daily (boarding passengers only).

Fiscal year	Daily average
2005	1,639
2006	1,535
2007	1,558
2008	1,492
2009	1,455
2010	1,434
2011	1,339
2012	1,313
2013	1,264
2014	1,301
2015	1,363
2016	1,385
2017	1,379

== Scheduled Bus Service ==
Nagaden Bus 12 which runs from Nagano Station to Mure Station on the Kita-Shinano Line in Iizuna, Nagano stops in front of the station at Hongo "Station Bus Stop".

== Surrounding area ==
=== Universities and colleges ===
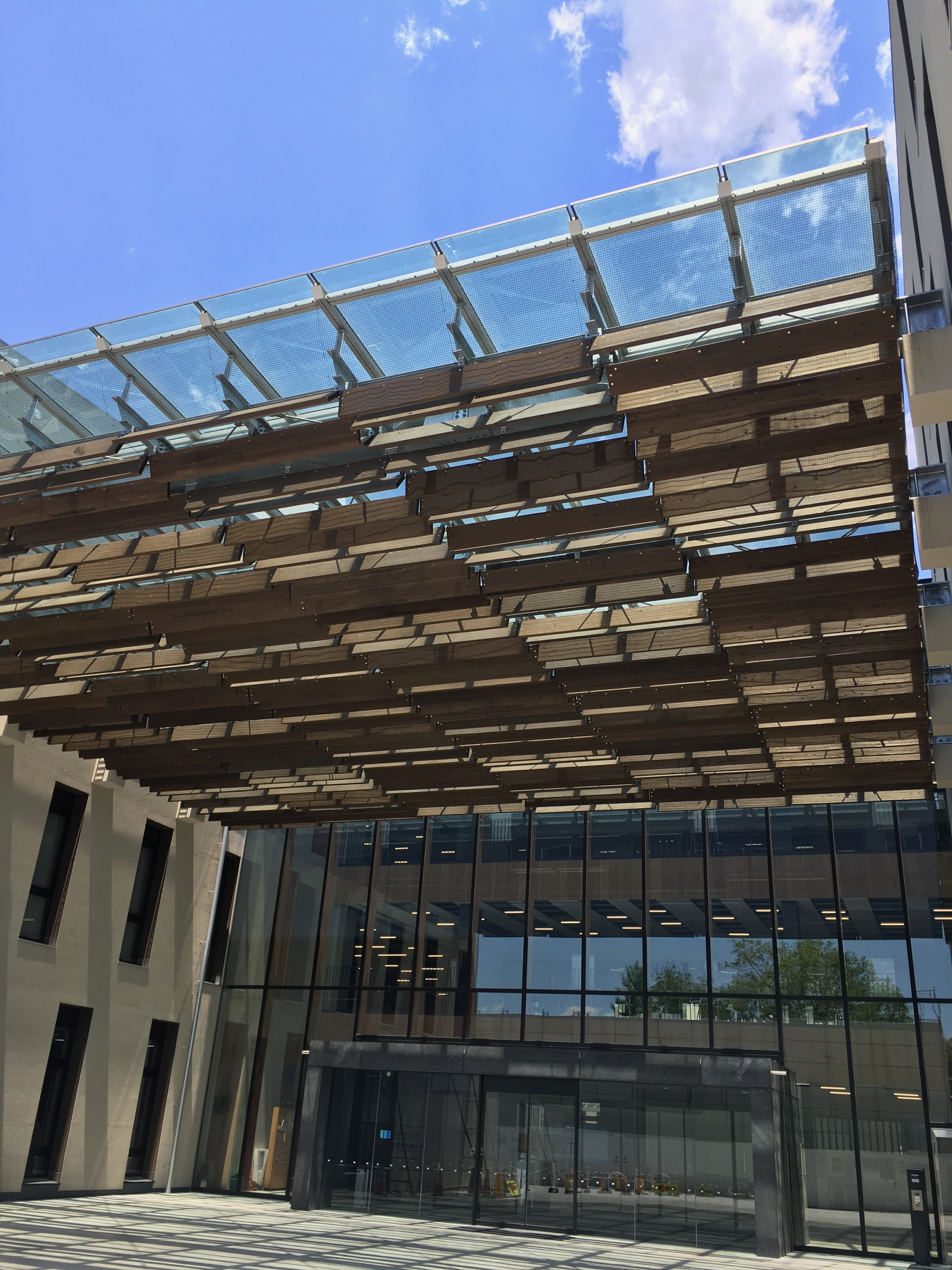
University of Nagano Main Entrance

- The University of Nagano (長野県立大学, Nagano Kenritsu Daigaku) - a 4-year public co-educational university
- The Nagano Women's Junior College (長野女子短期大学, Nagano joshi tanki daigaku)

=== Schools ===
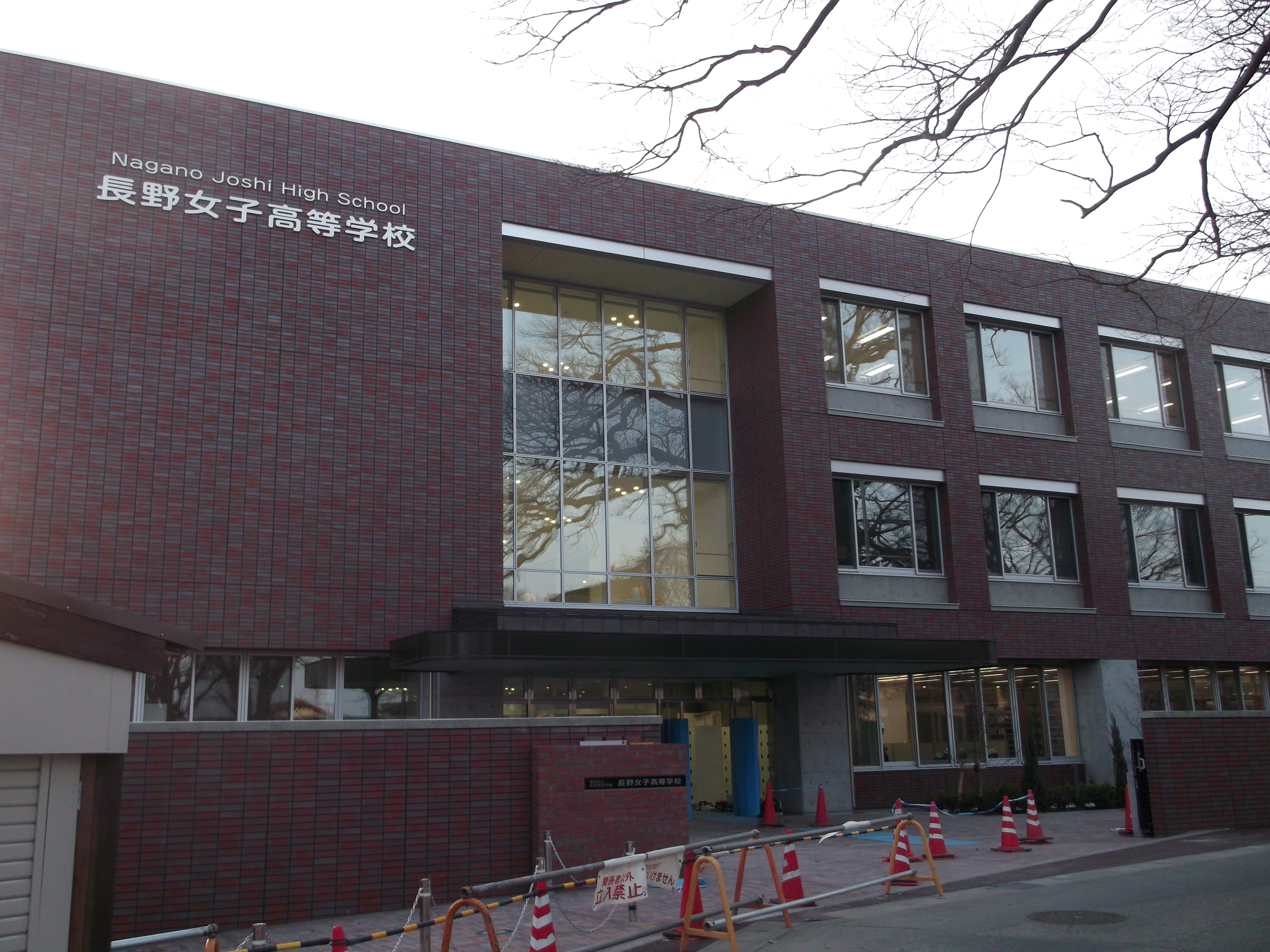
Nagano Girls Senior High School

- Nagano School for the Deaf (長野県長野ろう学校, Naganoken Nagano rou gakkou)
- Nagano Prefectural, Nagano Senior High School (長野県長野高等学校, Naganoken Nagano koutou gakkou)
- Nagano Girls Senior High School (長野女子高等学校, Nagano joshi koutou gakkou)

=== Shrines ===
- Miwa Shrine (美和神社, Miwa jinja), one of the seven shrines of Zenkō-ji, is in front of Hongō Station.

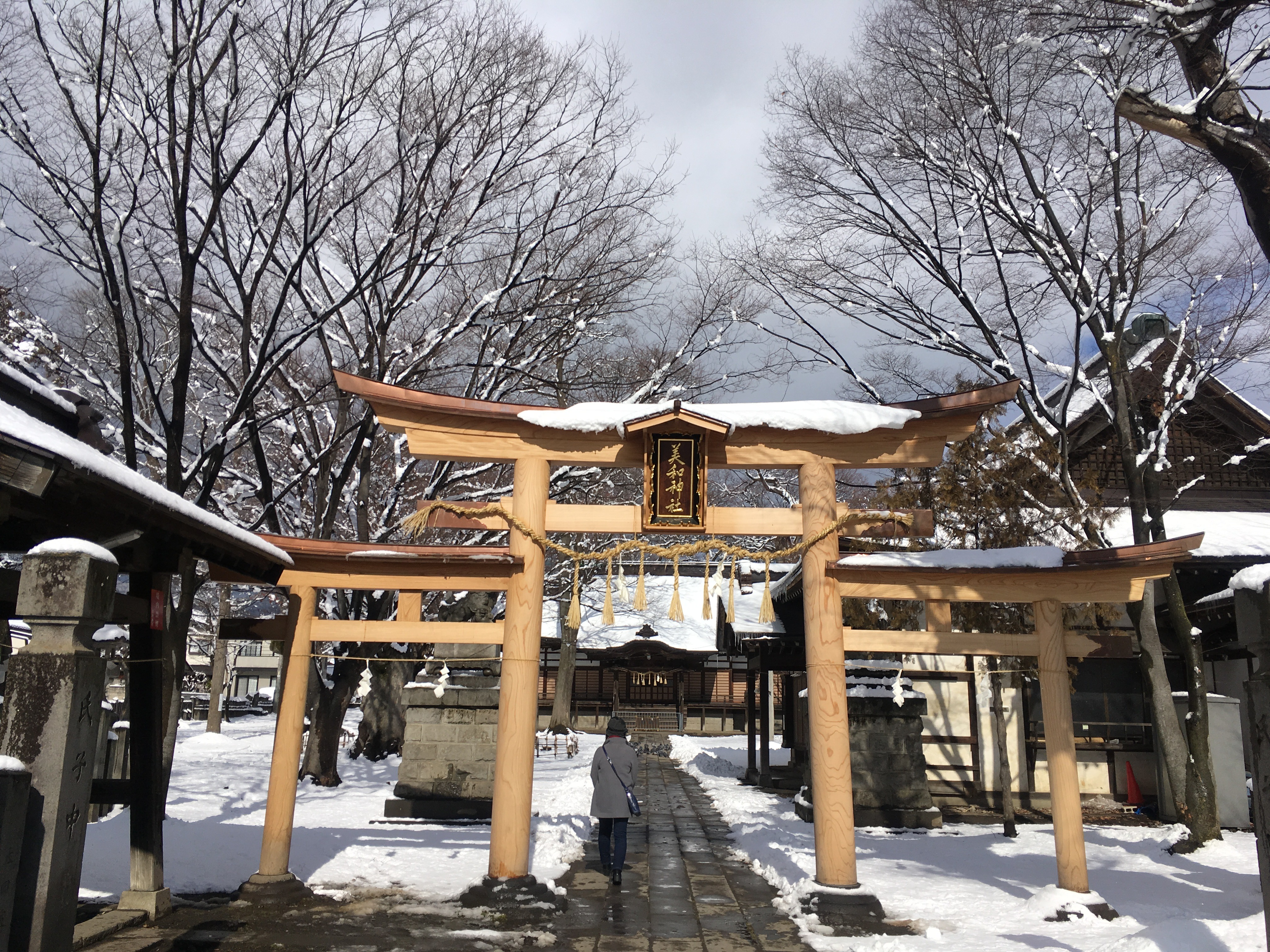
Main gate of Miwa Shrine

- Yakushi Shrine (八櫛神社, Yakushi jinja), founded in 807

=== Businesses ===
- Delicia (デリシア, Derishia), a supermarket chain based in Nagano Prefecture, is located 500m to the south of the station.
- Aeon Town Nagano Miwa (イオンタウン長野三輪, Iontaun Nagano Miwa) is to the north of the station.
- Yamada Denki (ヤマダ電機) is to the north of the station.
- Keiyo D2 (ケーヨーD2, Ke-yo- deitsu), a Japanese DIY chain, is located 1.1 kilometers southeast of the station.

=== Other ===
- Nagano City Hall (長野市役所 Nagano shiyakusho) is a 25-minute walk from Hongō Station, near Shiyakushomae Station (Nagano) (市役所前駅 Shiyakushomae-eki)
- Nagano Central Police Station (長野中央警察署 Nagano chuo keisatsusho)
- Nagano Prefectural Shinano Art Museum / Higashiyama Kaii Gallery (長野県信濃美術館・東山魁夷館) is 1.4 km west of Hongō Station.
- Joyama Park (城山公園, Jouyamakouen) is 1.5 km west of Hongō Station.
- The Nagano Prefectural road Number 399, locally called Ainoki Doori (相ノ木通り) between Nagano and Toyono (豊野町, Toyono-machi), 長野県道399号長野豊野線 (Naganokenodou 399gou Nagano Toyono sen), runs parallel to Hongō Station.

== Gallery ==
Hongō Station (Nagano)
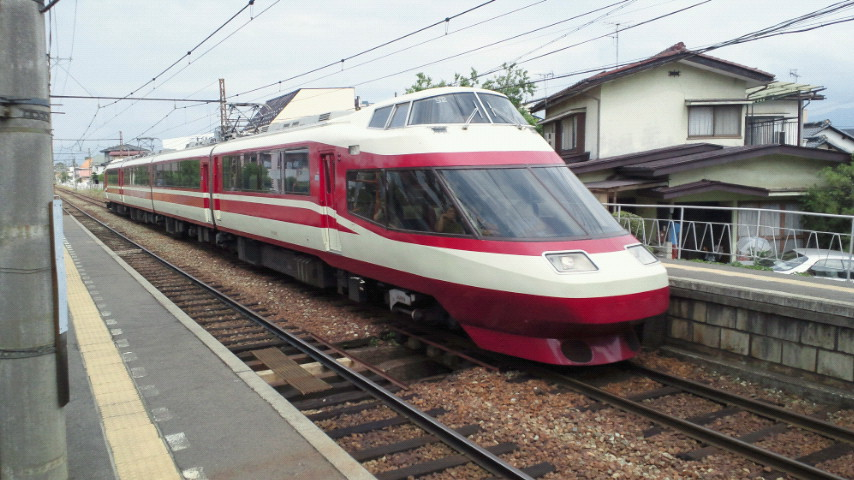
Nagano Electric Railway 1000 Series Train at Hongō Station

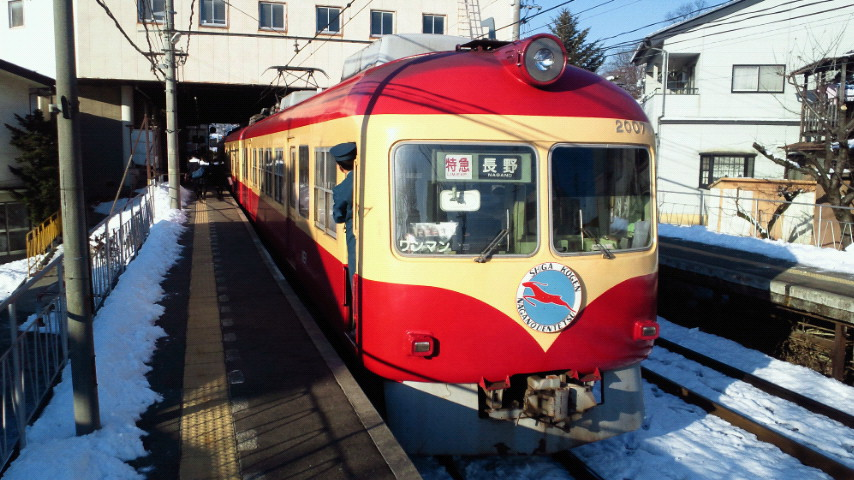
Nagano Electric Railway 2000 series Train at Hongō Station

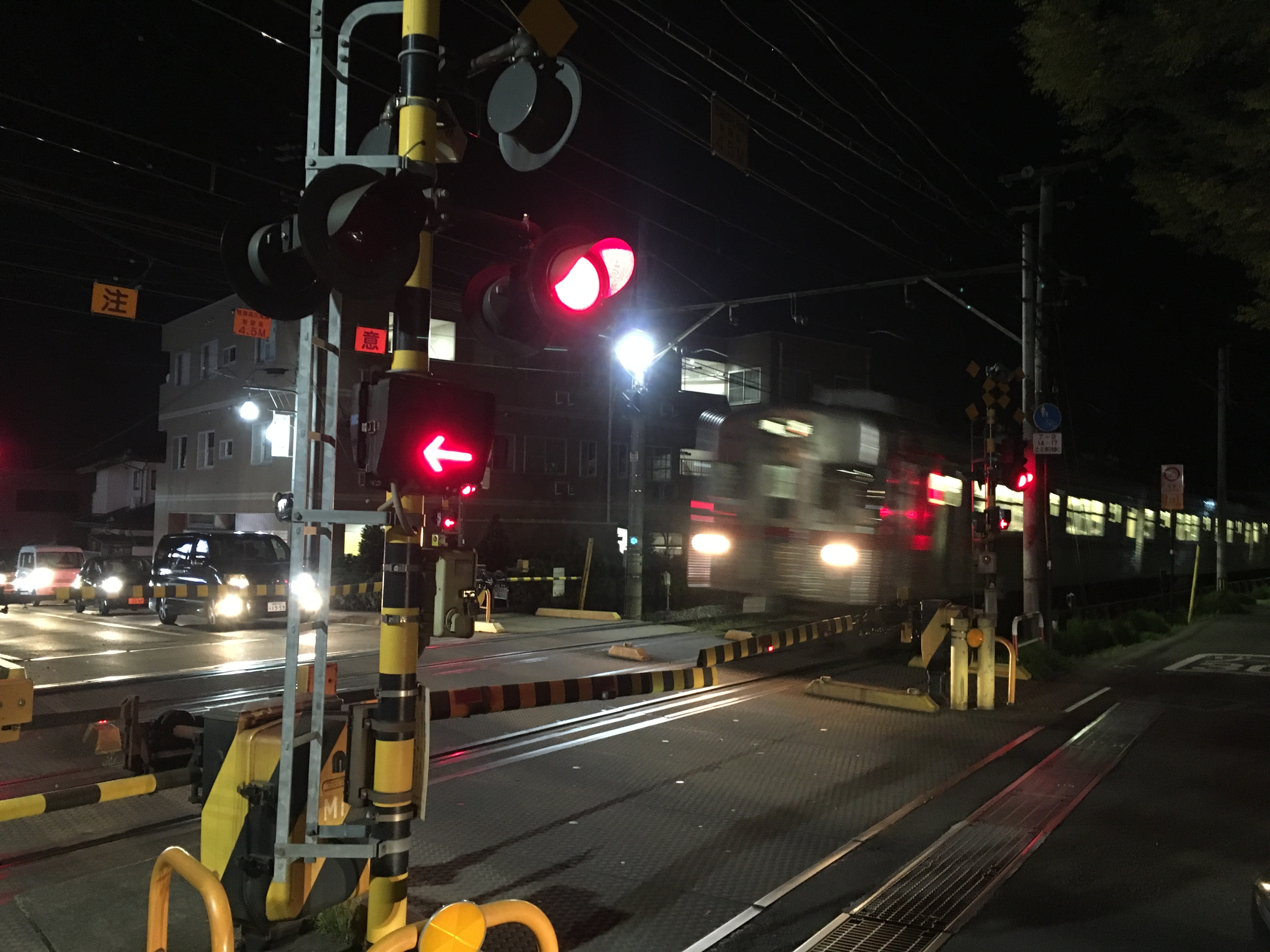
Nagano Electric Railway, 8500 series EMU train, pulling into Hongō Station, Nagano.

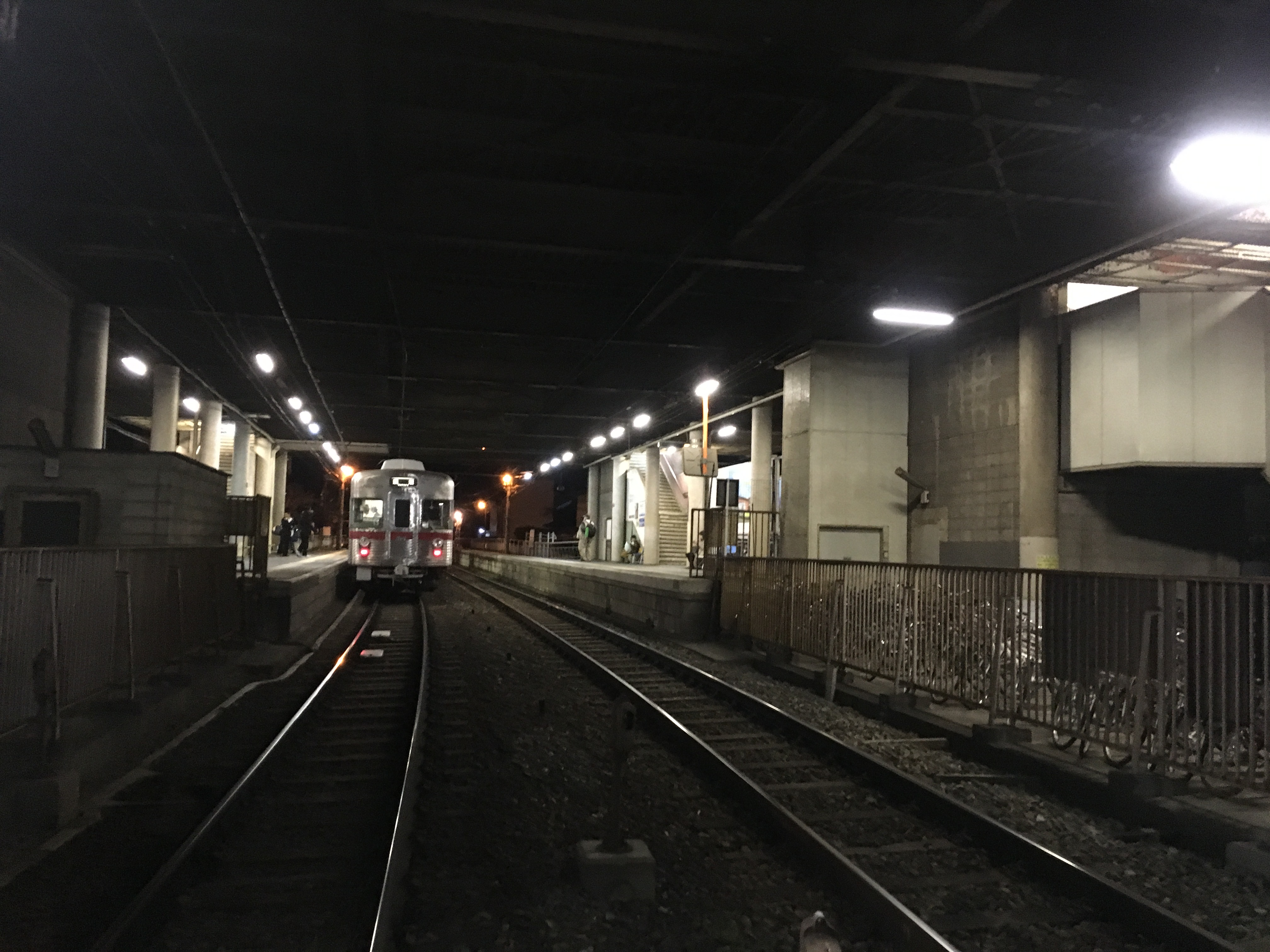
Nagano Electric Railway, Hongō Station Platform with the 8500 series EMU train bound for Suzaka Station.

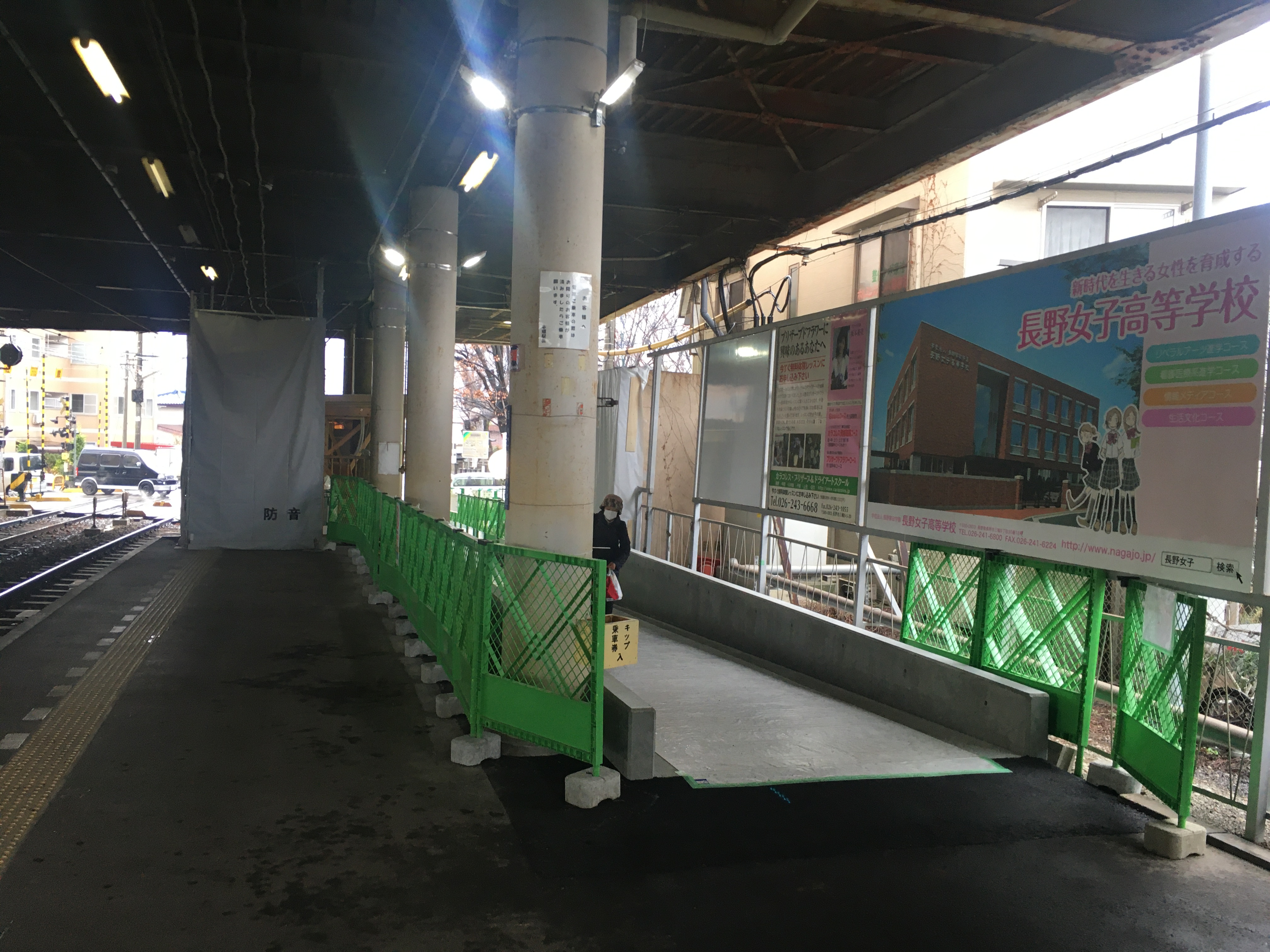
New entrance at Hongō Station Platform under construction.

== See also ==
- List of railway stations in Japan
