= Kirihara Station (Nagano) =

Railway station in Nagano, Nagano Prefecture, Japan

Kirihara Station 桐原駅
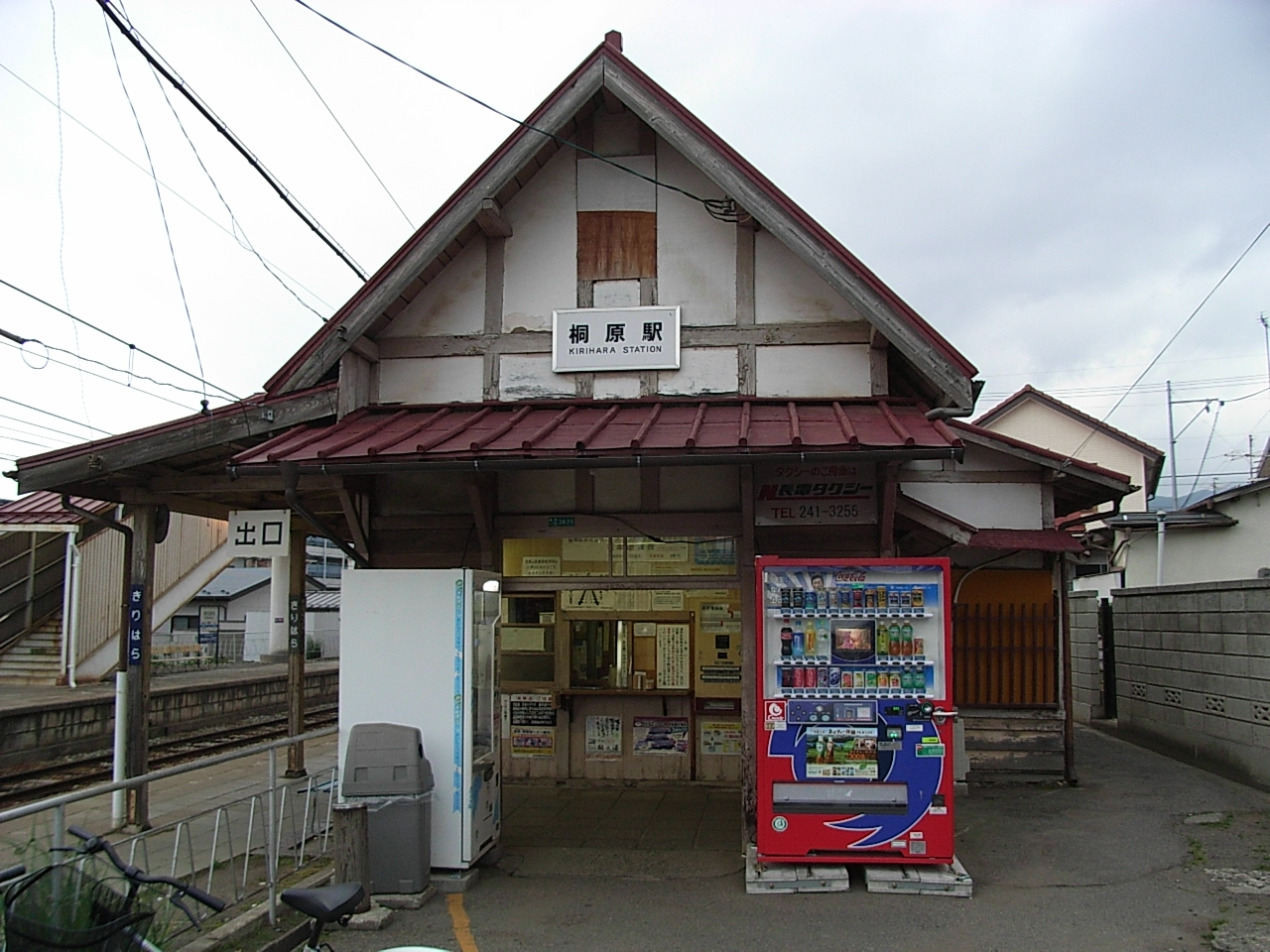
- Kirihara Station in June 2009

General information
- Location: 1-24-21 Kirihara, Nagano-shi, Nagano-ken 381-0045; Japan
- Coordinates: 36°39′56.5″N 138°12′47.3″E
- Operator: Nagano Electric Railway
- Line: ■ Nagano Electric Railway Nagano Line
- Distance: 3.6 km from Nagano
- Platforms: 2 side platform
- Tracks: 2

Other information
- Station code: N6
- Website: Official website

History
- Opened: 28 June 1926

Passengers
- FY2016: 914 daily
Location
- Location within Japan

Kirihara Station (桐原駅, Kirihara-eki) is a railway station in the city of Nagano, Japan, operated by the private railway operating company Nagano Electric Railway.

== Lines ==
Kirihara Station is a station on the Nagano Electric Railway Nagano Line and is 3.6 kilometers from the terminus of the line at Nagano Station.

== Station layout ==
The station consists of two opposed ground-level side platforms serving two tracks, connected by a footbridge. The station is staffed.

=== Platforms ===
1	■ Nagano Electric Railway Nagano Line	for Suzaka, Shinshū-Nakano and Yudanaka
2	■ Nagano Electric Railway Nagano Line	for Gondō and Nagano

== Adjacent stations ==
«	Service	»
Nagano Electric Railway
Express-A: Does not stop at this station
Express-B: Does not stop at this station
Hongō	Local	Shinano-Yoshida

== History ==
The station opened on 28 June 1926.

== Passenger statistics ==
In fiscal 2016, the station was used by an average of 914 passengers daily (boarding passengers only).

== Surrounding area ==
- Sumitaruho Yoshida Jinja
- Kiriharamaki Jinja
- Nagano Yoshida High School

== See also ==
- List of railway stations in Japan
