= Yanagihara Station (Nagano) =

Railway station in Nagano, Nagano Prefecture, Japan

Yanagihara Station 柳原駅
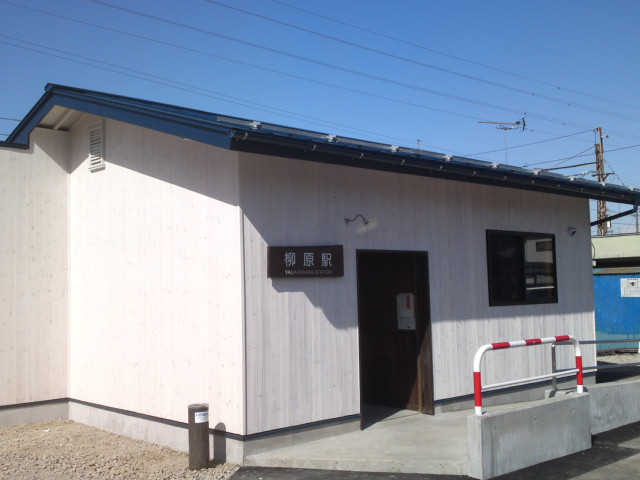
- Yanagihara Station in 2012

General information
- Location: 21332 Yanagihara, Nagano-shi, Nagano-ken 381-0012; Japan
- Coordinates: 36°39′48.6″N 138°15′31.4″E
- Operator: Nagano Electric Railway
- Line: ■ Nagano Electric Railway Nagano Line
- Distance: 8.0 km from Nagano
- Platforms: 1 island platform
- Tracks: 2

Other information
- Station code: N10
- Website: Official website

History
- Opened: 28 June 1926

Passengers
- FY2016: 641 daily
Location
- Location within Japan

Yanagihara Station (柳原駅, Yanagihara-eki) is a railway station in the city of Nagano, Japan, operated by the private railway operating company Nagano Electric Railway.

== Lines ==
Yanagihara Station is a station on the Nagano Electric Railway Nagano Line and is 8.0 kilometers from the terminus of the line at Nagano Station, and approximately 23 km from its opposite terminus at Yudanaka Station. From Nagano, soon after departing Yanagihara, the train crosses the Murayama Bridge over the Chikuma River before arriving at Murayama Station in Suzaka, Nagano.

== Station layout ==
The station consists of one ground-level island platform serving two tracks.

=== Platforms ===
1	■ Nagano Electric Railway Nagano Line	for Obuse, Shinshū-Nakano and Yudanaka
2	■ Nagano Electric Railway Nagano Line	for Gondō and Nagano

== Adjacent stations ==
«	Service	»
Nagano Electric Railway
Express-A: Does not stop at this station
Express-B: Does not stop at this station
Fuzokuchūgakumae	Local	Murayama

== History ==
The station opened on 28 June 1926.

== Passenger statistics ==
In fiscal 2016, the station was used by an average of 754 passengers daily (boarding passengers only).

== Surrounding area ==
- National Route 18
- National Route 406
- Yanagihara Elementary School
- Chikuma River

== See also ==
- List of railway stations in Japan
