= Zenkōjishita Station =

Railway station in Nagano, Nagano Prefecture, Japan

Zenkōjishita Station 善光寺下駅
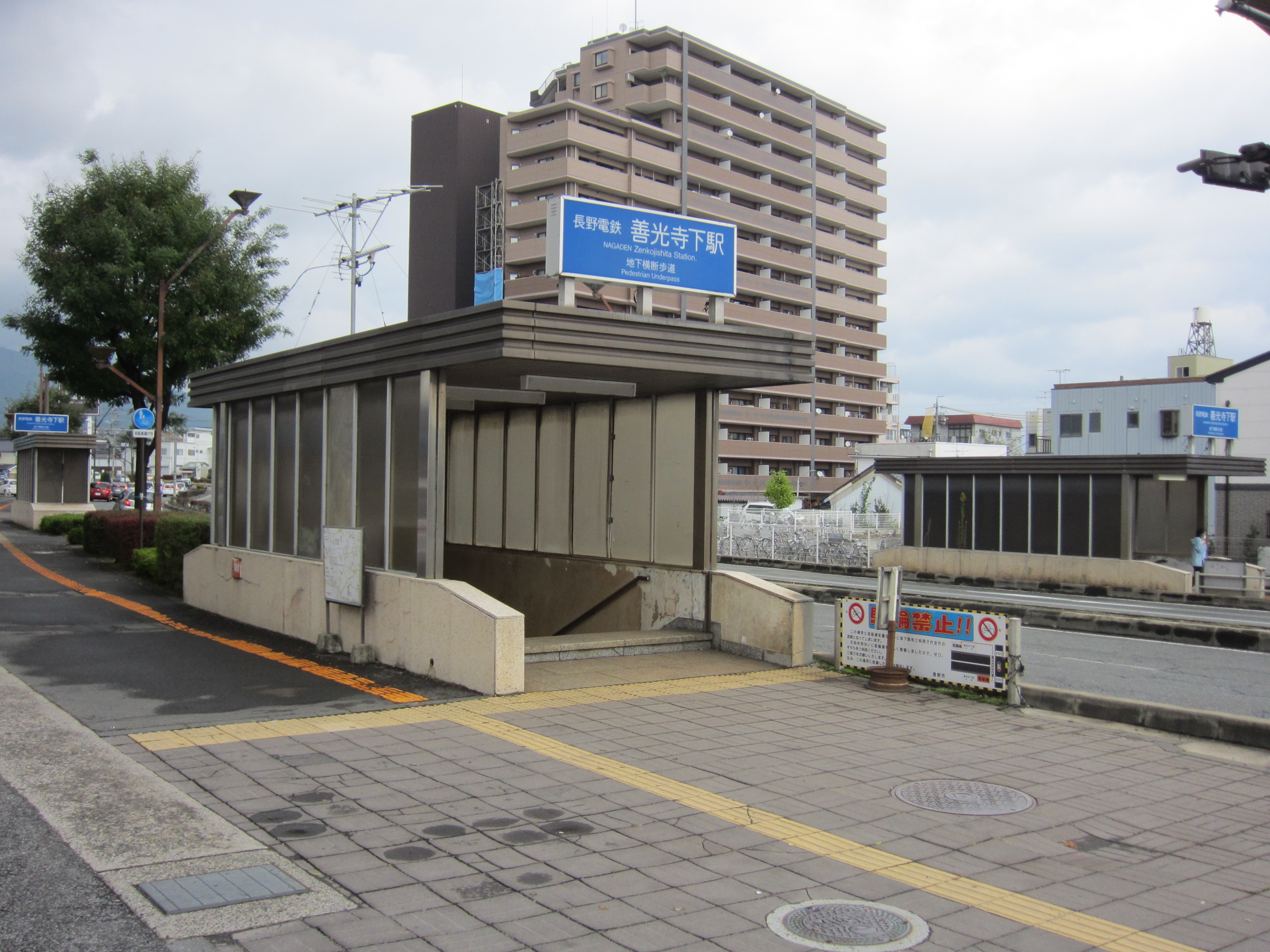
- Zenkōjishita Station in November 2013

General information
- Location: 7-919-2 Miwa, Nagano-shi, Nagano-ken 380-0803; Japan
- Coordinates: 36°39′31.0″N 138°11′36.6″E
- Operator: Nagano Electric Railway
- Line: ■ Nagano Electric Railway Nagano Line
- Distance: 1.6 km from Nagano
- Platforms: 2 side platforms
- Tracks: 2

Other information
- Station code: N4
- Website: Official website

History
- Opened: 28 June 1926

Passengers
- FY2016: 670 daily
Location
- Location within Japan

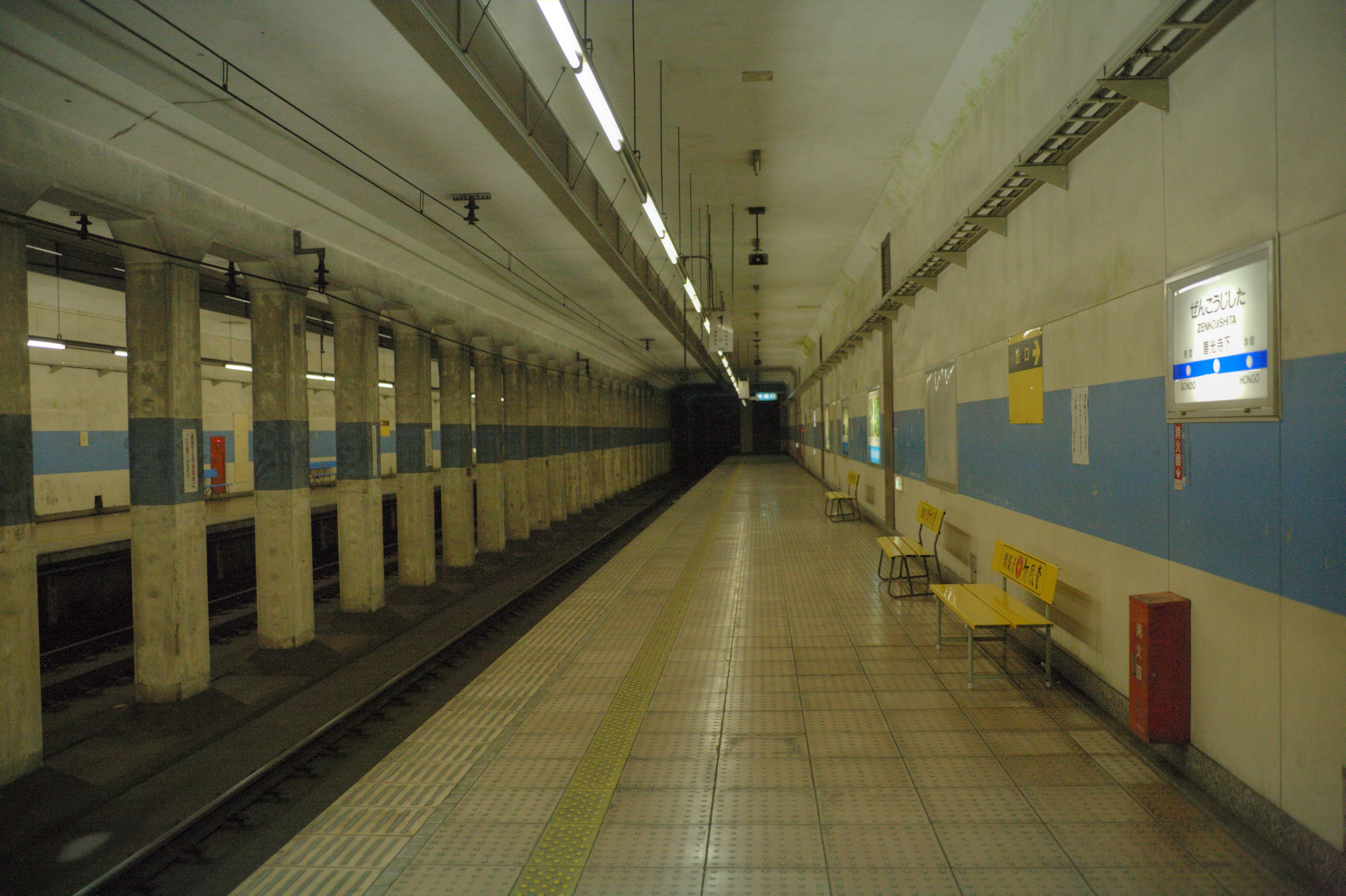
Underground platforms

Zenkōjishita Station (善光寺下駅, Zenkōjishita-eki) is an underground railway station in the city of Nagano, Japan, operated by the private railway operating company Nagano Electric Railway.

== Lines ==
Zenkōjishita Station is a station on the Nagano Electric Railway Nagano Line and is 1.6 kilometers from the terminus of the line at Nagano Station.

== Station layout ==
The station is an underground station consisting of two opposed side platforms serving two tracks. The station is staffed.

=== Platforms ===
1	■ Nagano Electric Railway Nagano Line	for Suzaka, Shinshū-Nakano and Yudanaka
2	■ Nagano Electric Railway Nagano Line	for Gondō and Nagano

== Adjacent stations ==
«	Service	»
Nagano Electric Railway
Express-A: Does not stop at this station
Express-B: Does not stop at this station
Gondō	Local	Hongō

== History ==
The station opened on 28 June 1926. It was reopened as an underground station on 26 March 1977.

== Passenger statistics ==
In fiscal 2016, the station was used by an average of 670 passengers daily (boarding passengers only).

== Surrounding area ==
- Joto Elementary School

== See also ==
- List of railway stations in Japan
