= Entoku Station =

Railway station in Nakano, Nagano Prefecture, Japan

Entoku Station 延徳駅
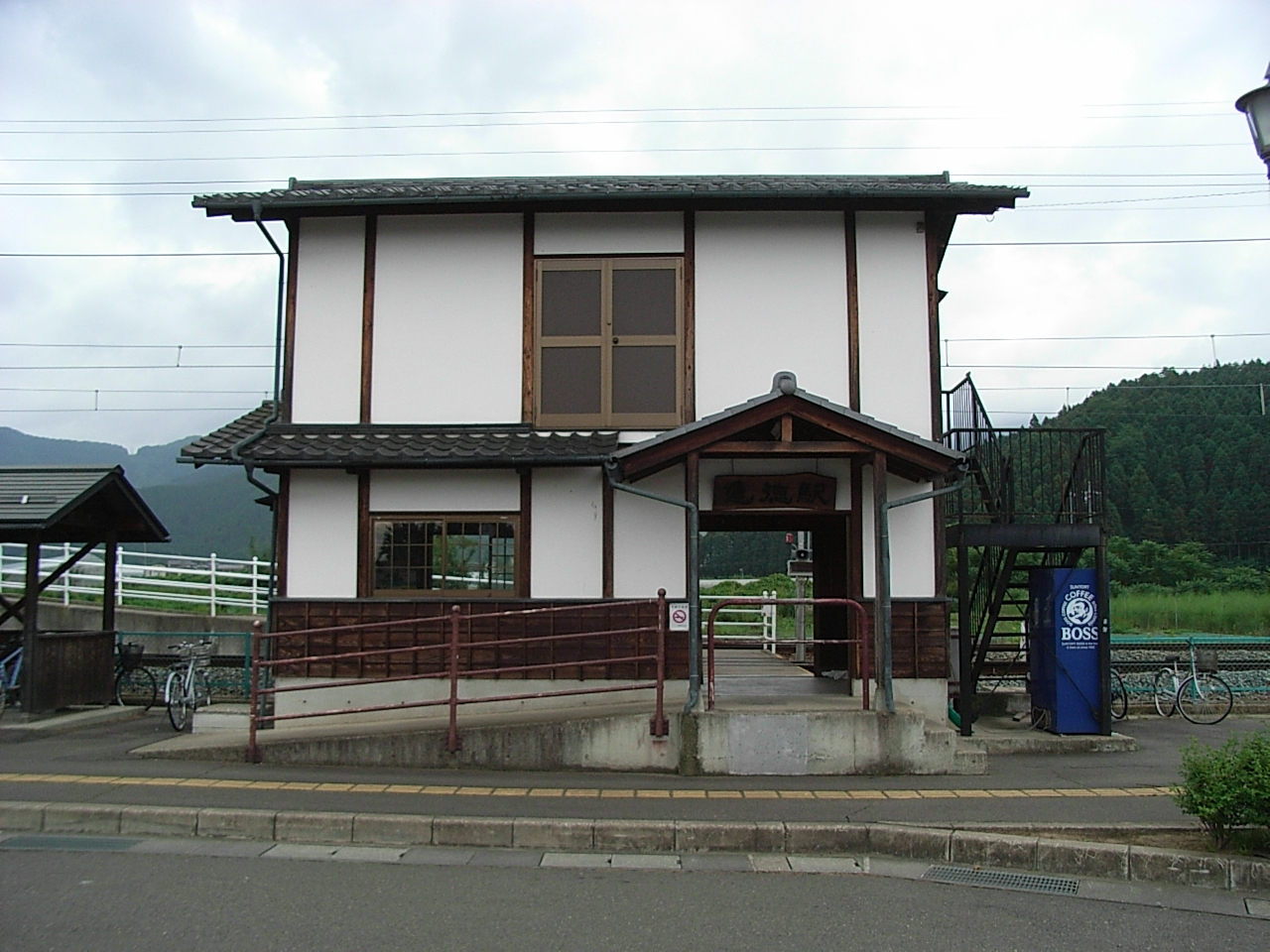
- Entoku Station in June 2009

General information
- Location: 229-2 Shinoi, Nakano-shi, Nagano-ken 383-0035; Japan
- Coordinates: 36°43′36.2″N 138°21′44.6″E
- Operator: Nagano Electric Railway
- Line: ■ Nagano Electric Railway Nagano Line
- Distance: 23.3 km from Nagano
- Platforms: 1 island platform
- Tracks: 2

Other information
- Status: Unstaffed
- Station code: N18
- Website: Official website

History
- Opened: 26 March 1923

Passengers
- FY2016: 132 daily
Location
- Location within Nagano Prefecture Location within Japan

Entoku Station (延徳駅, Entoku-eki) is a railway station in the city of Nakano, Nagano, Japan, operated by the private railway operating company Nagano Electric Railway.

== Lines ==
Entoku Station is a station on the Nagano Electric Railway Nagano Line and is 23.3 kilometers from the terminus of the line at Nagano Station.

== Station layout ==
The station consists of one ground-level island platform connected to the two story station building by a level crossing. The station is unattended.

=== Platforms ===
“station side"	■ Nagano Electric Railway Nagano Line	for Yudanaka
“opposite side"	■ Nagano Electric Railway Nagano Line	for Nagano

== Adjacent stations ==
«	Service	»
Nagano Electric Railway
Express-A: Does not stop at this station
Express-B: Does not stop at this station
Sakurasawa	Local	Shinshūnakano

== History ==
The station opened on 26 March 1923. The station was relocated 300 meters towards Shinshūnakano Station in 1994 and the station building rebuilt in 1993 for the 1998 Winter Olympics.

== Passenger statistics ==
In fiscal 2015, the station was used by an average of 132 passengers daily (boarding passengers only).

== Surrounding area ==
- Shinpei Nakayama Memorial Museum

== See also ==
- List of railway stations in Japan
