= Obuse Station =

Railway station in Obuse, Nagano Prefecture, Japan

Obuse Station 小布施駅
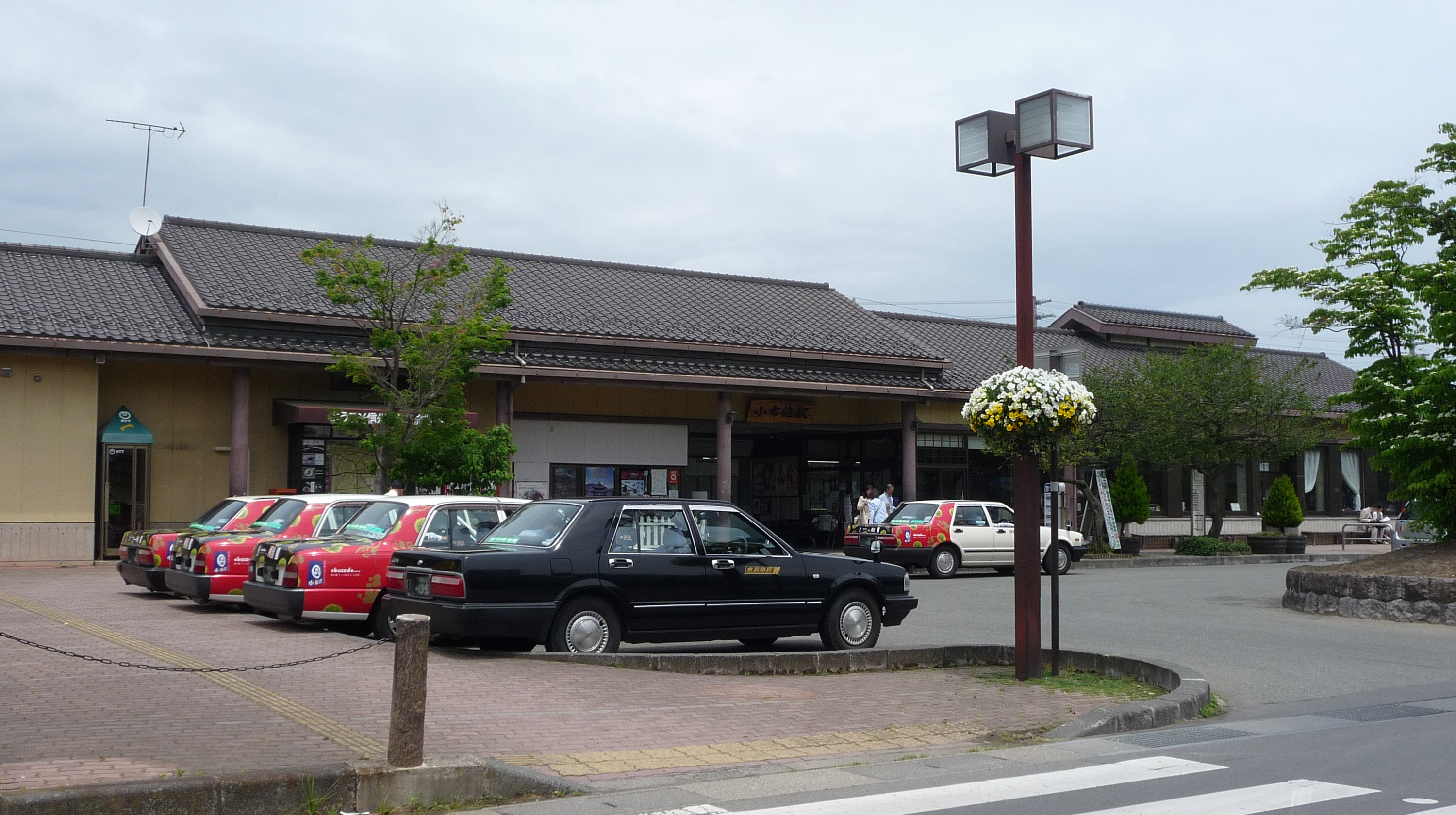
- Obuse Station in May 2009

General information
- Location: 1497-2 Obuse, Obuse-cho, Kamitakai-gun, Nagano-ken 381-0201; Japan
- Coordinates: 36°41′56.0″N 138°18′45.8″E
- Operator: Nagano Electric Railway
- Line: ■ Nagano Electric Railway Nagano Line
- Distance: 17.5 km from Nagano
- Platforms: 1 side + 2 island platform
- Tracks: 3

Other information
- Status: Staffed
- Station code: N15
- Website: Official website

History
- Opened: 26 March 1923

Passengers
- FY2016: 754 daily
Location
- Location within Nagano Prefecture Location within Japan

Obuse Station (小布施駅, Obuse-eki) is a railway station in the town of Obuse, Nagano, Japan, operated by the private railway operating company Nagano Electric Railway.

== Lines ==
Obuse Station is a station on the Nagano Electric Railway Nagano Line and is 17.5 kilometers from the terminus of the line at Nagano Station.

== Station layout ==
The station consists of one ground-level side platform and one island platform serving three tracks. The station is staffed.

=== Platforms ===
1	■ Nagano Electric Railway Nagano Line	for Suzaka and Nagano
2	■ Nagano Electric Railway Nagano Line	for Shinshū-Nakano and Yudanaka
3	■ Nagano Electric Railway Nagano Line	(for passing trains)

== Adjacent stations ==
«	Service	»
Nagano Electric Railway
Suzaka	Express-A	Shinshū-Nakano
Suzaka	Express-B	Shinshū-Nakano
Kitasuzaka	Local	Tsusumi

== History ==
The station opened on 26 March 1923.

== Passenger statistics ==
In fiscal 2016, the station was used by an average of 754 passengers daily (boarding passengers only).

== Surrounding area ==
- Obuse Town Hall
- Obuse Post Office
- Obuse Elementary School

== See also ==
- List of railway stations in Japan
