= Nagano Electric Railway =

Railway company in Japan

- Trade name: Nagaden
- Native name: 長野電鉄
- Romanized name: Nagano Dentetsu
- Type: Public K.K.
- Industry: Conglomerate
- Founded: May 30, 1920; 106 years ago
- Headquarters: 〒380-0833; 2201, Gondocho, Nagano, Nagano (長野県長野市権堂町2201), Japan
- Area served: Nagano.
- Key people: Tohei Kodu (founder)
- Services: passenger railways other related services
- Owner: Kitano Construction (8.56%); Hachijuni Bank (3.73%); Dai-ichi Hoki (1.04%)
- Subsidiaries: Nagaden Bus
- Website: www.nagaden-net.co.jp//

Map of the Nagano Line

Nagano Electric Railway (長野電鉄, Nagano Dentetsu) is a private railway company based in Nagano, Nagano Prefecture, Japan. The company and its line are commonly referred to as Nagaden (長電). It originally operated three lines, but only the Nagano Line between Nagano — Suzaka — Shinshū-Nakano — Yudanaka remains in service. Nagaden owns a 1.1% stake in Shinano Railway.

== Nagano Line ==
The Nagano Line connects Nagano Station in Nagano with Yudanaka Station in Yamanouchi.

In addition to local travel, the line provides access for tourists and visitors to sites including Obuse, Shiga Kogen Ski Resort, Jigokudani Monkey Park (Snow Monkey Park) and onsens/hot springs at Yudanaka [ja].

=== Services ===
Local services from Nagano operate to Suzaka, Shinshū-Nakano and Yudanaka, stopping at every station. Passengers travelling further than Shinshū-Nakano are generally required to transfer to a connecting train at Shinshū-Nakano.

Limited Express trains Snow Monkey and Yukemuri operate multiple services every day between Nagano and Yudanaka. On Saturdays, Sundays and public holidays, one round trip of Yukemuri operates as Yukemuri ~Leisurely Train~ which slows down or stops at multiple scenic locations along the line.

Numerous "Event trains" operate on the Nagano Line. Kita-Shinano Wine Valley Train and Shinshu Local Sake Train operate throughout the year. Nagaden Wine Train, Nagaden Beer Train and Nagaden Japan Sake Train operate on specified days.

=== Stations ===
All stations are in Nagano Prefecture.

Legend
●	All trains stop at this station
｜	All trains pass this station

No.	Station name	Japanese	Distance (km)		Limited Express		Connections	Tracks	Location
No.	Station name	Japanese	Between stations	Total	A	B	Connections	Tracks	Location
N1	Nagano	長野	-	0.0	●	●	Hokuriku Shinkansen; Shin'etsu Main Line; Shinano Railway Kita-Shinano Line	Two	Nagano
N2	Shiyakushomae	市役所前	0.4	0.4	｜	●		Two	Nagano
N3	Gondō	権堂	0.6	1.0	●	●		Two	Nagano
N4	Zenkōjishita	善光寺下	0.6	1.6	｜	｜		Two	Nagano
N5	Hongō	本郷	1.1	2.7	｜	●		Two	Nagano
N6	Kirihara	桐原	0.9	3.6	｜	｜		Two	Nagano
N7	Shinano-Yoshida	信濃吉田	0.7	4.3	｜	●	Shinano Railway Kita-Shinano Line (Kita-Nagano)	Two	Nagano
N8	Asahi	朝陽	2.0	6.3	｜	●		∨	Nagano
N9	Fuzokuchūgakumae	附属中学前	0.7	7.0	｜	｜		｜	Nagano
N10	Yanagihara	柳原	1.0	8.0	｜	｜		◇	Nagano
N11	Murayama	村山	2.0	10.0	｜	｜		◇	Suzaka
N12	Hino	日野	1.0	11.0	｜	｜		｜	Suzaka
N13	Suzaka	須坂	1.5	12.5	●	●		◇	Suzaka
N14	Kitasuzaka	北須坂	2.5	15.0	｜	｜		◇	Suzaka
N15	Obuse	小布施	2.5	17.5	●	●		◇	Obuse (Kamitakai)
N16	Tsusumi	都住	1.1	18.6	｜	｜		｜	Obuse (Kamitakai)
N17	Sakurasawa	桜沢	2.7	21.3	｜	｜		◇	Nakano
N18	Entoku	延徳	2.0	23.3	｜	｜		◇	Nakano
N19	Shinshū-Nakano	信州中野	2.3	25.6	●	●		◇	Nakano
N20	Nakano-Matsukawa	中野松川	1.4	27.0	｜	｜		｜	Nakano
N21	Shinano-Takehara	信濃竹原	2.3	29.3	｜	｜		◇	Nakano
N22	Yomase	夜間瀬	1.1	30.4	｜	｜		｜	Yamanouchi (Shimotakai)
N23	Kamijō	上条	1.4	31.8	｜	｜		｜	Yamanouchi (Shimotakai)
N24	Yudanaka	湯田中	1.4	33.2	●	●		｜	Yamanouchi (Shimotakai)

=== Rolling stock ===
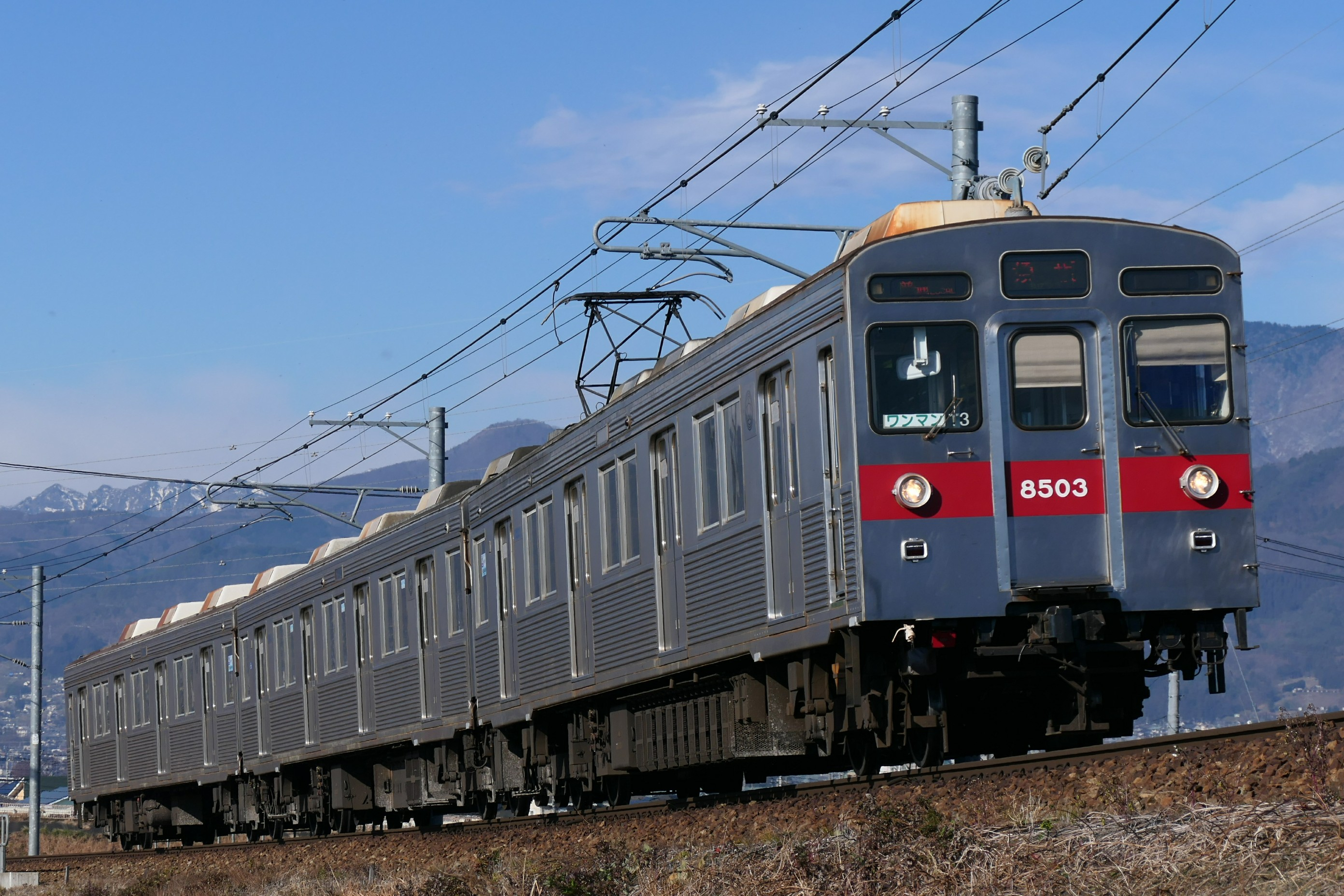
An 8500 series EMU

==== Current rolling stock ====
- 1000 series 4-car EMUs (2 sets)

Ex-Odakyū 10000 series HiSE sets for Limited express "A" Yukemuri services. Entered service from 9 December 2006.

- 2100 series 3-car EMUs (2 sets)

Ex-JR Narita Express 253 series sets for Snow Monkey limited express services. Entered service from 26 February 2011.

- 3000 series 3-car EMUs

Ex-Tokyo Metro 03 series sets for local services. Introduced in January 2020. Scheduled to replace the existing 3500 & 3600 series in 2020.

- 8500 series 3-car EMUs (6 sets)

Ex-Tokyu 8500 series sets for local services. Introduced in 2005.

==== Former rolling stock ====
- 2000 series 3-car EMUs

For Limited express "B" services. (1957–August 2011)

- 0 series

For "Officeman & Student" Local services. (1966–2002)

- 10 series

For "Officeman & Student" Local services. (1980–2017)

- 3500 series 2-car EMUs (14 sets) and 3600 series 3-car EMUs (3 sets)

Ex-TRTA 3000 series sets for local services. (1993–January 19, 2023)

== History ==
The original Nagano Electric Railway was built in 1926, connecting Gondō in Nagano with Suzaka, and electrified at 1,500 V DC. Later that year, the company absorbed the operations of Katō Railway, which operated a line on the east bank of the Chikuma River from Yashiro via Suzaka to Kijima, with the Gongo to Yoshida section being double-tracked. The following year, an additional line was constructed from Shinshū-Nakano to Yudanaka, and in 1928, the line was extended to Nagano Station as dual track.

The Yoshida - Asahi section was double-tracked in 1956, and freight services ceased in 1979. CTC signalling was commissioned between Yudanaka and Asahi in 1980, and extended to Nagano in 1984. The section from Nagano to Zenkōjishita was converted to an underground railway in 1981.

=== Former connecting lines ===
- Suzaka Station: The Kato Railway opened a 24 km (15 mi) line to Yashiro on the (now) Shinano Railway Line in 1922, electrified it at 1,500 V DC in January 1926, and merged with the Nagano Electric Railway in September the same year. Due to falling patronage, the line closed on 31 March 2012.
- Shinshū-Nakano Station: The Kato Railway opened the 13 km (8.1 mi) line to Kijima in 1925 and electrified it at 1,500 V DC the following year. Freight services ceased in 1979 and CTC signalling was commissioned on the line in 1980, but due to falling patronage, the line closed in 2002.

== Gallery ==
Nagano Electric Railway
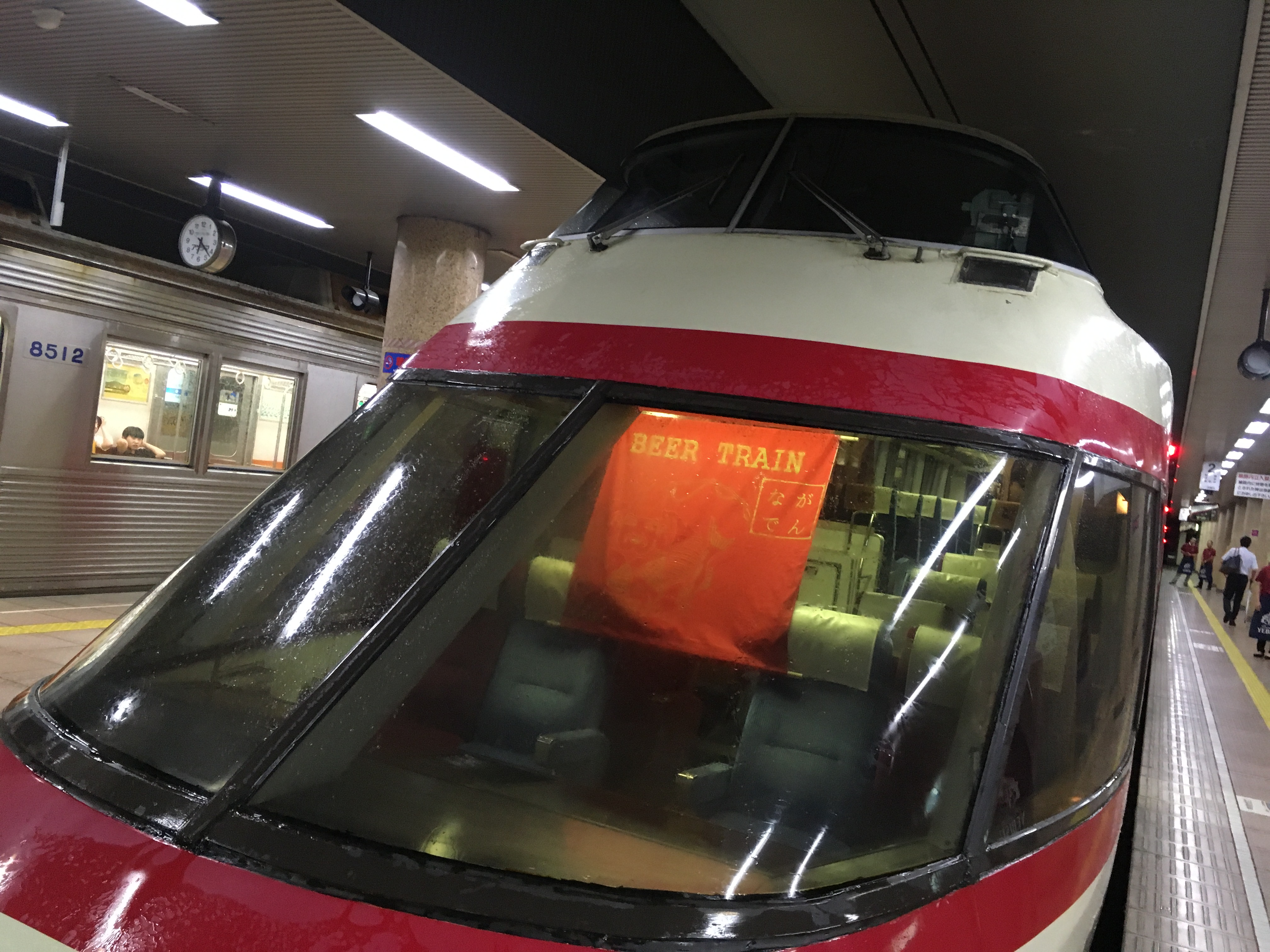
Nagaden Beer Train

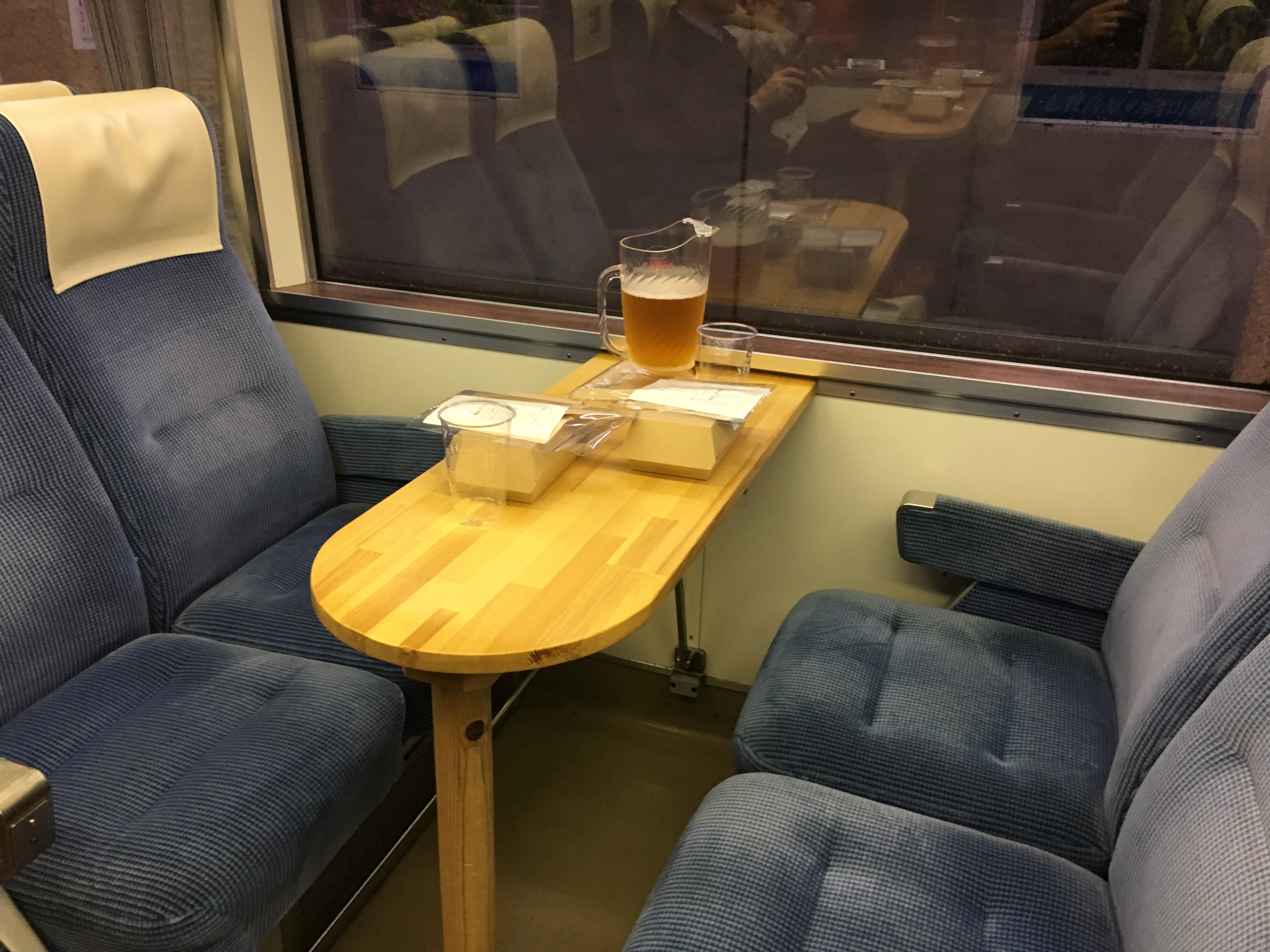
Nagaden Beer Train with bento boxes

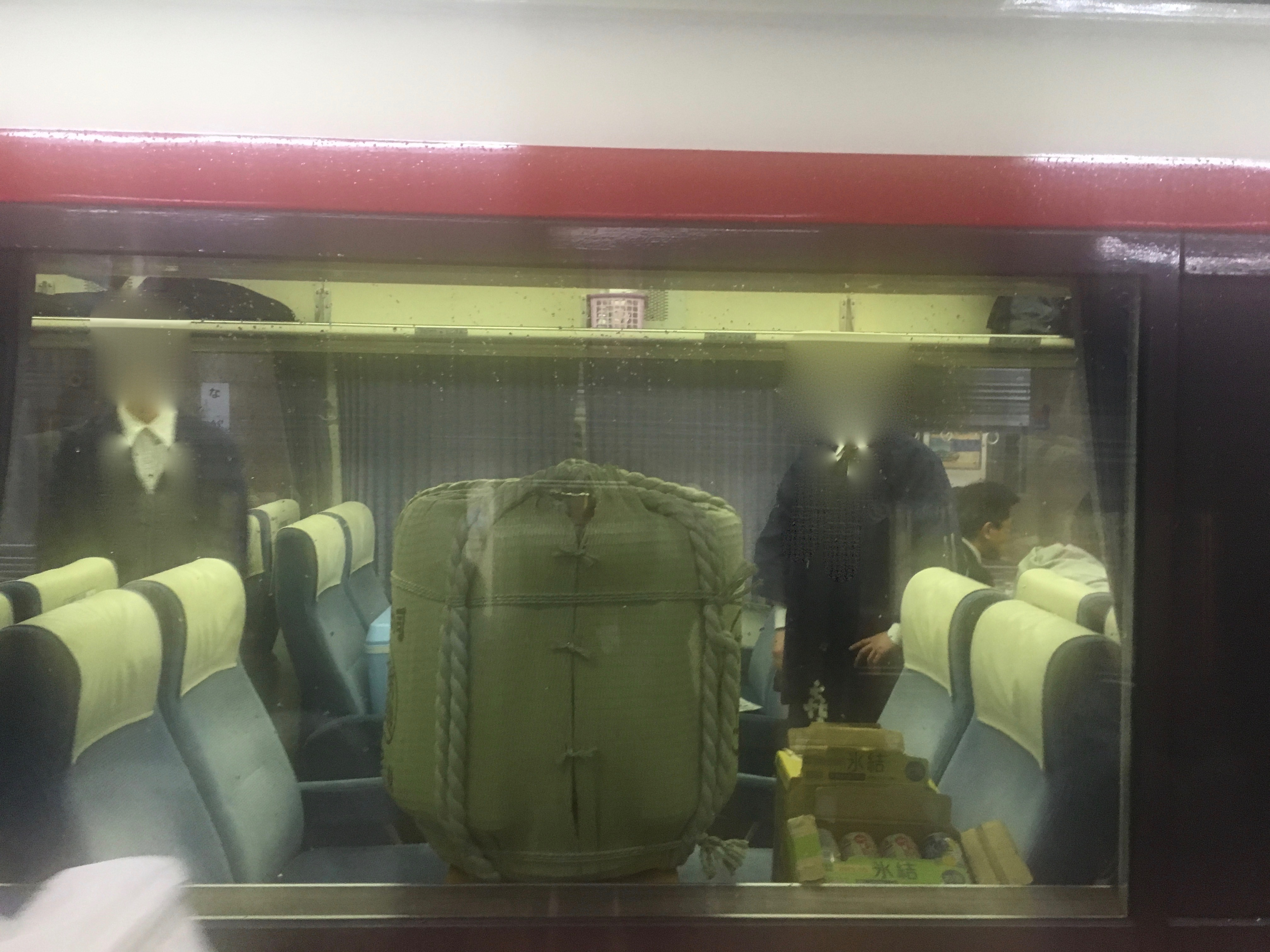
Nagaden Local Sake (Jizake) Train

== See also ==
- List of railway lines in Japan
