= Shinanotakehara Station =

Railway station in Nakano, Nagano Prefecture, Japan

Shinano-Takehara Station 信濃竹原駅
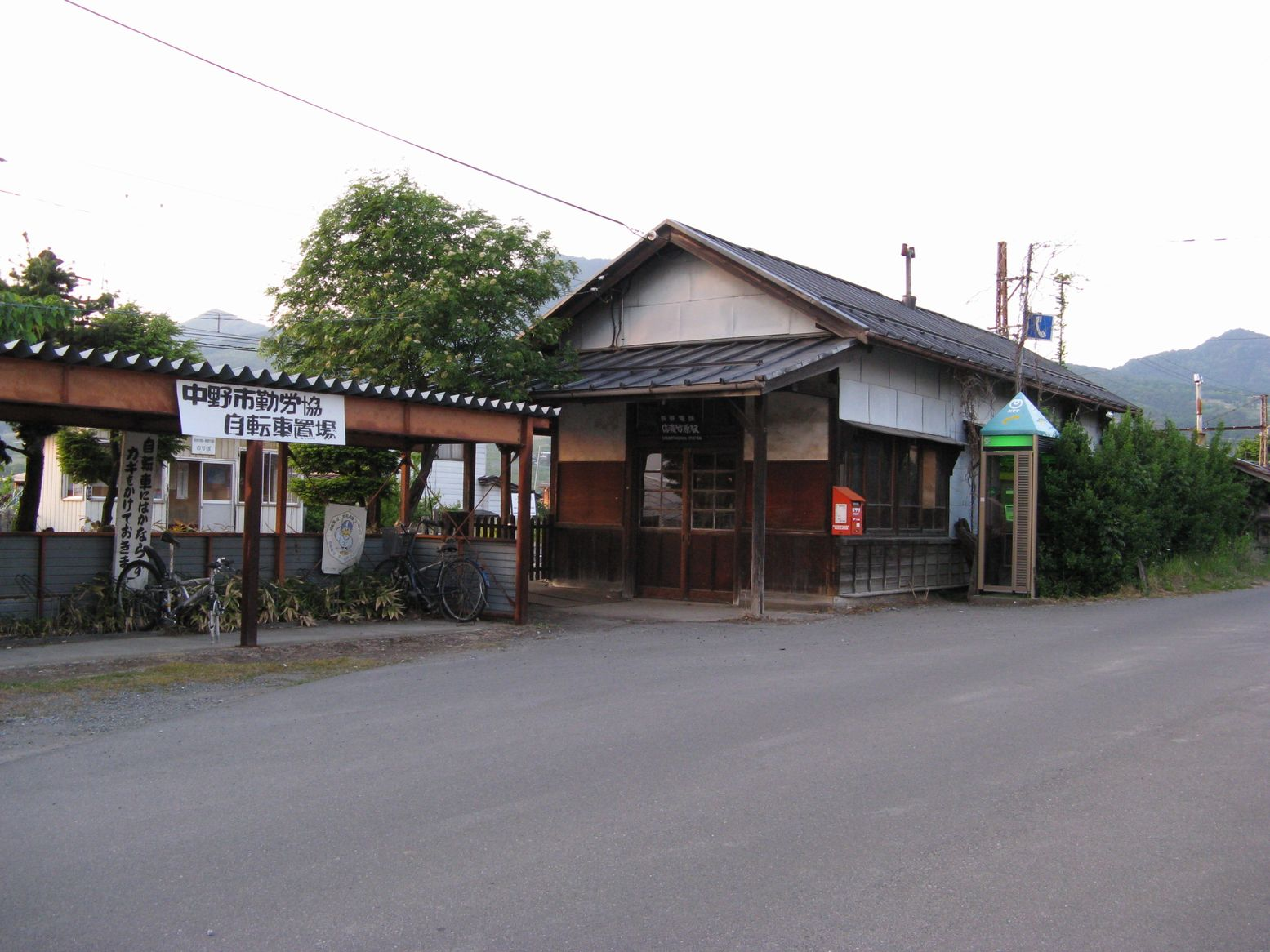
- Shinano-Takehara Station in May 2009

General information
- Location: 1813 Takehara, Nakano-shi, Nagano-ken 383-0007; Japan
- Coordinates: 36°45′39.6″N 138°23′37.3″E
- Operator: Nagano Electric Railway
- Line: ■ Nagano Electric Railway Nagano Line
- Distance: 29.3 km from Nagano
- Platforms: 2 side platforms
- Tracks: 2

Other information
- Station code: N21
- Website: Official website

History
- Opened: 28 April 1927
- Former names: Takehara (to 1932)

Passengers
- FY2016: 33 daily
Location
- Location within Nagano Prefecture Location within Japan

Shinano-Takehara Station (信濃竹原駅, Shinanotakehara-eki) is a railway station in the city of Nakano, Nagano, Japan, operated by the private railway operating company Nagano Electric Railway.

== Lines ==
Shinano-Takehara Station is a station on the Nagano Electric Railway Nagano Line and is 29.3 kilometers from the terminus of the line at Nagano Station.

== Station layout ==
The station consists of two ground-level opposed side platforms serving two tracks. The platforms are not numbered The station is unattended.

=== Platforms ===
“station side"	■ Nagano Electric Railway Nagano Line	for Yudanaka
“opposite side"	■ Nagano Electric Railway Nagano Line	for Nagano

== Adjacent stations ==
«	Service	»
Nagano Electric Railway
Express-A: Does not stop at this station
Express-B: Does not stop at this station
Nakano-Matsukawa	Local	Yomase

== History ==
The station opened on 28 April 1927 as Takehara Station (竹原駅). It was renamed to its present name on 16 June 1932.

== Passenger statistics ==
In fiscal 2015, the station was used by an average of 33 passengers daily (boarding passengers only).

== Surrounding area ==
- National Route 292
- National Route 403

== See also ==
- List of railway stations in Japan
