= Kitasuzaka Station =

Railway station in Suzaka, Nagano Prefecture, Japan

Kitasuzaka Station 北須坂駅
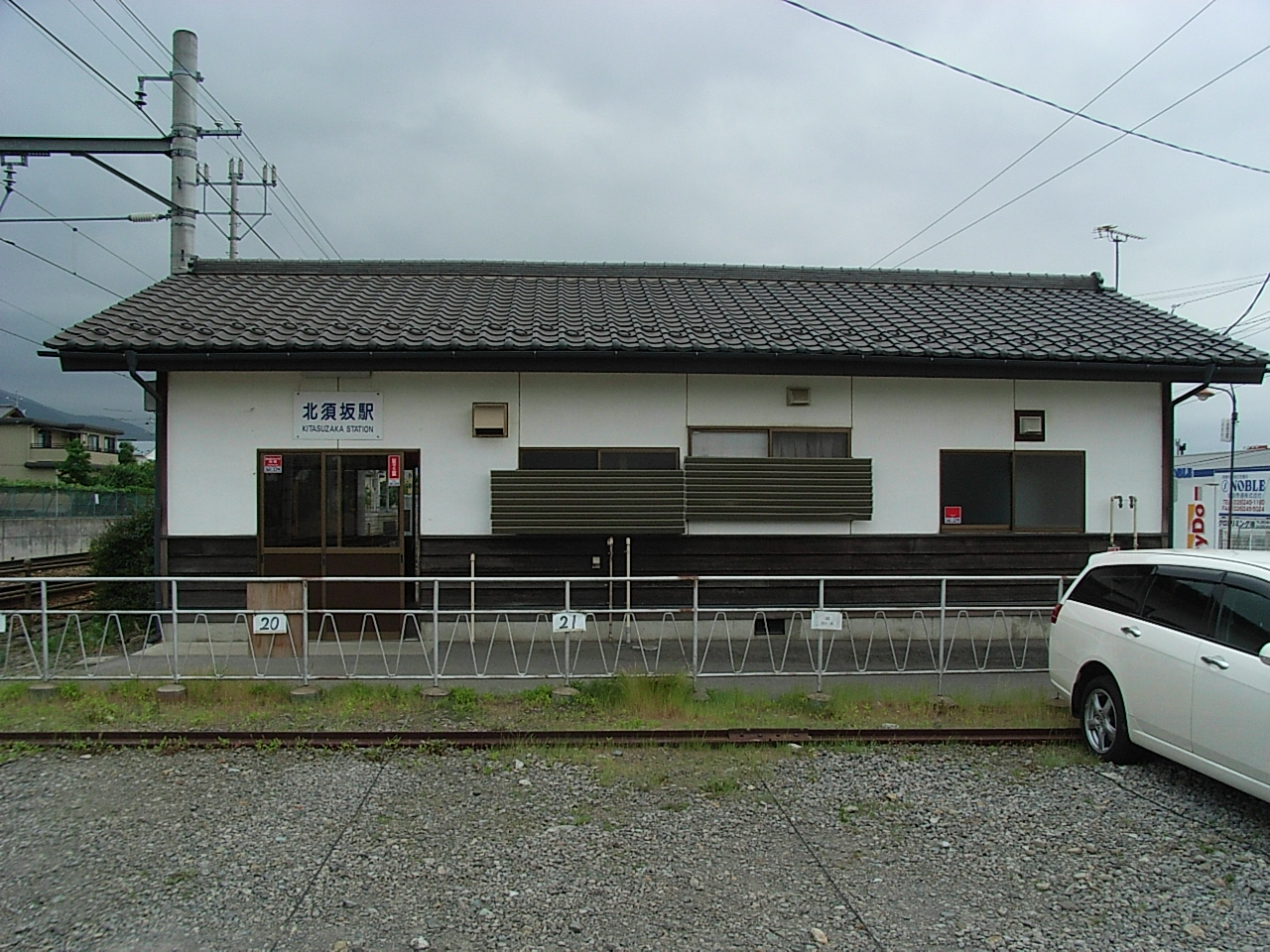
- Kitasuzaka Station in July 2009

General information
- Location: 2129-4 Ogawara, Suzaka-shi, Nagano-ken 382-0000; Japan
- Coordinates: 36°40′42.5″N 138°18′31.0″E
- Operator: Nagano Electric Railway
- Line: ■ Nagano Electric Railway Nagano Line
- Distance: 15.0 km from Nagano
- Platforms: 1 side platform
- Tracks: 1

Other information
- Station code: N14
- Website: Official website

History
- Opened: 26 March 1923
- Former names: Toyosu (to 1960)

Passengers
- FY2016: 342 daily
Location
- Location within Nagano Prefecture Location within Japan

Kitasuzaka Station (北須坂駅, Kitasuzaka-eki) is a railway station in the city of Suzaka, Nagano, Japan, operated by the private railway operating company Nagano Electric Railway.

== Lines ==
Kitasuzaka Station is a station on the Nagano Electric Railway Nagano Line and is 15.0 kilometers from the terminus of the line at Nagano Station.

== Station layout ==
The station consists of one ground-level side platform serving a single bi-directional track. The station is unattended.

== Adjacent stations ==
«	Service	»
Nagano Electric Railway
Express-A: Does not stop at this station
Express-B: Does not stop at this station
Suzaka	Local	Obuse

== History ==
The station opened on 26 March 1923 as Toyosu Station (豊洲駅). It was renamed to its present name on 11 April 1960.

== Passenger statistics ==
In fiscal 2016, the station was used by an average of 342 passengers daily (boarding passengers only).

== Surrounding area ==
- National Route 403
- Asahigaoka Elementary School

== See also ==
- List of railway stations in Japan
