= Kamijō Station (Nagano) =

Railway station in Yamanouchi, Nagano Prefecture, Japan

Kamijō Station 上条駅
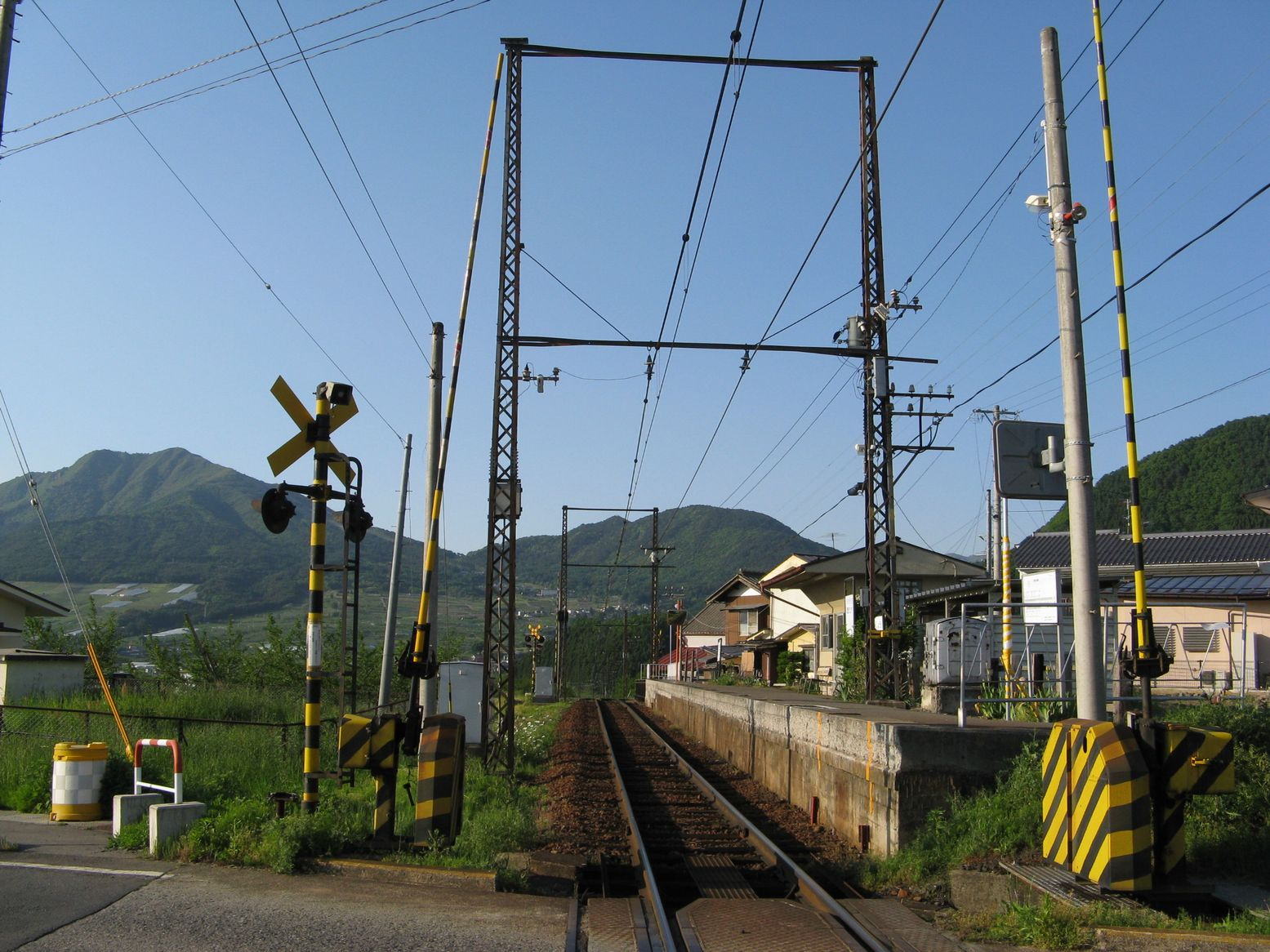
- Kamijō Station in May 2009

General information
- Location: 4594-2 Hirao, Shimotakai-gun Yamanouchi-machi, Nagano-ken 381-0401; Japan
- Coordinates: 36°44′58.2″N 138°24′27.1″E
- Operator: Nagano Electric Railway
- Line: ■ Nagano Electric Railway Nagano Line
- Distance: 31.8 km from Nagano
- Platforms: 1 side platform
- Tracks: 1

Other information
- Status: Unstaffed
- Station code: N23
- Website: Official website

History
- Opened: 28 April 1927

Passengers
- FY2015: 21 daily
Location
- Location within Nagano Prefecture Location within Japan

Kamijō Station (上条駅, Kamijō-eki) is a railway station in the town of Yamanouchi, Nagano, Japan, operated by the private railway operating company Nagano Electric Railway.

== Lines ==
Kamijō Station is a station on the Nagano Electric Railway Nagano Line. It is 1.4 kilometers from Yudanaka Terminus and 31.8 kilometers from the terminus of the line at Nagano Station. The station began operating April 28, 1927. In 1970, the station was no longer staffed. In September 2006, major renovations were completed at Yudanaka Station. During that time, Kamijō was terminus for the Nagaden Train, and passengers were bussed to Yudanaka. In 2011, Kamijō was excluded from Limited B Express trains.

== Station layout ==
The station consists of one ground-level side platform serving a single bi-directional track. The station is unattended.

== Adjacent stations ==
«	Service	»
Nagano Electric Railway
Express-A: Does not stop at this station
Express-B: Does not stop at this station
Yomase	Local	Yudanaka

== History ==
The station opened on 28 April 1927.

== Surrounding area ==
The station is located in a rural area surrounded by apple orchards.

== Passenger statistics ==
In fiscal 2015, the station was used by an average of 21 passengers daily (boarding passengers only).

Fiscal year	Daily average
2010	39
2011	36
2012	31
2013	24
2014	22
2015	21

== See also ==
- List of railway stations in Japan
