= Gondō Station =

Railway station in Nagano, Nagano Prefecture, Japan

Gondō Station 権堂駅
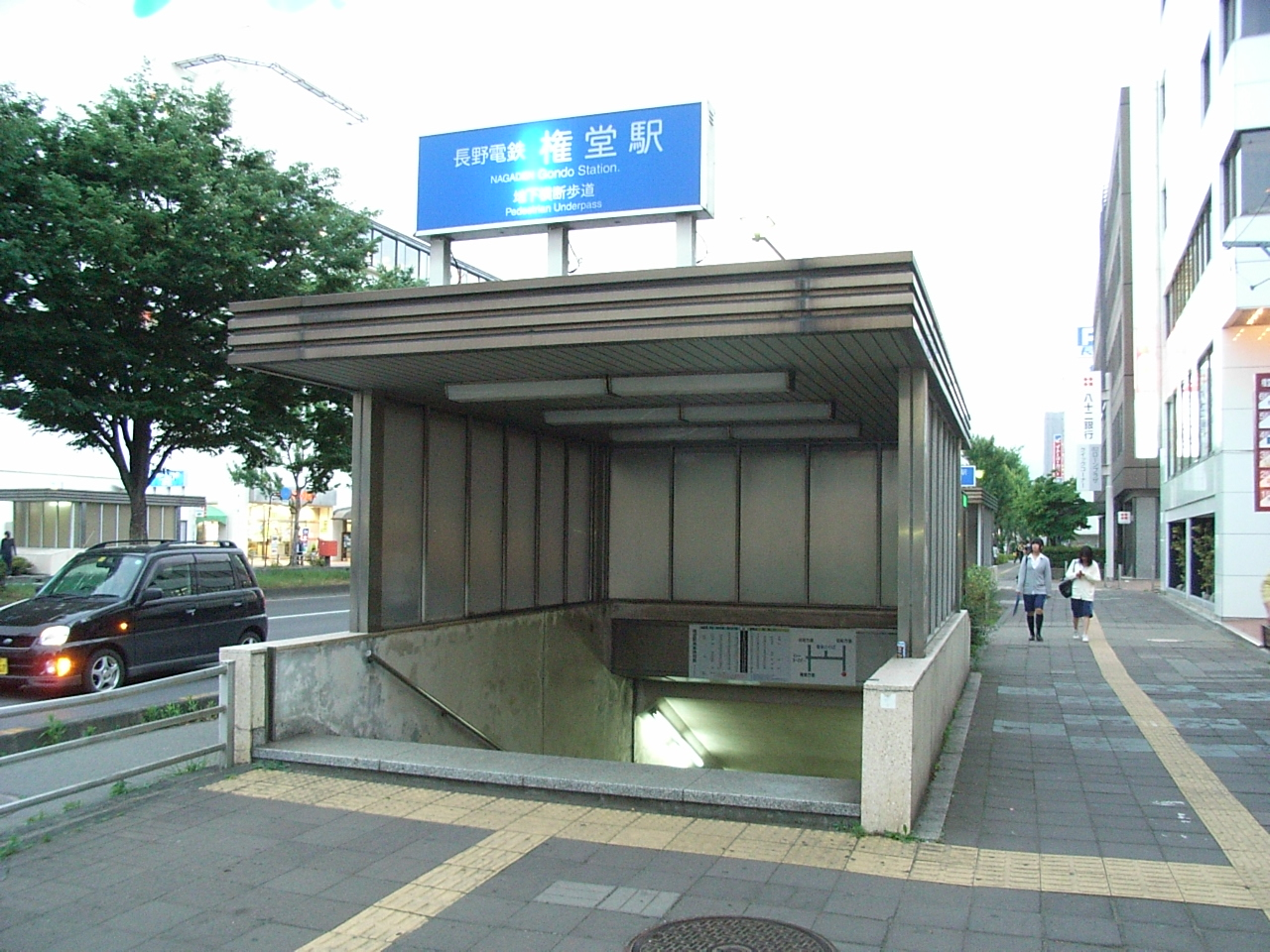
- Gondō Station in November 2013

General information
- Location: 2199-10 Tsuruga-Gondō-chō, Nagano-shi, Nagano-ken 381-0000; Japan
- Coordinates: 36°39′11.1″N 138°11′30.7″E
- Operator: Nagano Electric Railway
- Line: ■ Nagano Electric Railway Nagano Line
- Distance: 1.0 km from Nagano
- Platforms: 2 side platforms
- Tracks: 2

Other information
- Station code: N3
- Website: Official website

History
- Opened: 28 June 1926
- Rebuilt: 1981

Passengers
- FY2016: 1305 daily
Location
- Location within Japan

Gondō Station (権堂駅, Gondō-eki) is an underground railway station in the city of Nagano, Japan, operated by the private railway operating company Nagano Electric Railway.

== Lines ==
Gondō Station is a station on the Nagano Electric Railway Nagano Line and is 1.0 kilometers from the terminus of the line at Nagano Station and 32.2 km from the terminus at Yudanaka Station in Yamanouchi, Nagano.

== Station layout ==
The station is an underground station consisting of two opposed side platforms serving two tracks. The station is staffed.

=== Platforms ===
1	■ Nagano Electric Railway Nagano Line	for Suzaka, Shinshū-Nakano and Yudanaka
2	■ Nagano Electric Railway Nagano Line	for Nagano

== Adjacent stations ==
«	Service	»
Nagano Electric Railway
Nagano	Express-A	Suzaka
Shiyakushomae	Express-B	Hongō
Shiyakushomae	Local	Zenkōjishita

== History ==
The station opened on 28 June 1926. It was reopened as an underground station on 1 March 1981.

== Passenger statistics ==
In fiscal 2016, the station was used by an average of 1305 passengers daily (boarding passengers only).

== Surrounding area ==
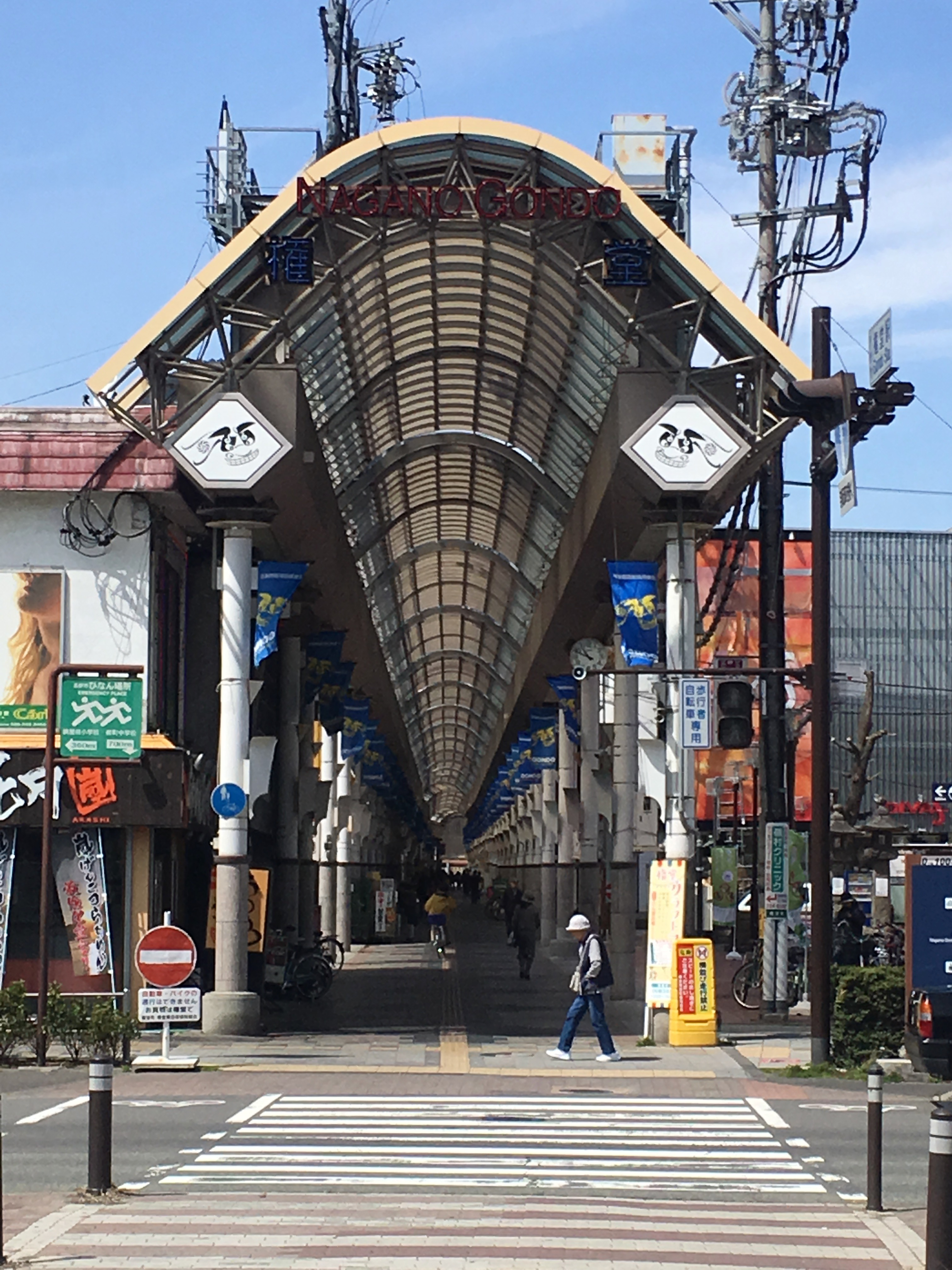
East Entrance of Gondo Arcade at Gondo Station

- central Nagano city
- Akiba Shrine (秋葉神社, Akiba Jinja)
- Gondo Arcade (権堂アーケード, Gondou a-ke-do)
- Head office of Nagano Electric Railway
- Ito-Yokado Nagano (株式会社イトーヨーカ堂, Kabushiki-gaisha Itō Yōkadō)
- Nagano Shochiku Aioiza Theatre (長野松竹相生座・長野ロキシー, Nagano Shouchiku Aioiza Naganoshi), a cinema which first opened as a kabuki theatre in 1892
- Gocho Campus of the University of Nagano

== See also ==
- List of railway stations in Japan
