= Nagano Junior College =

Coordinates: 36°39′57.1″N 138°12′17.5″E

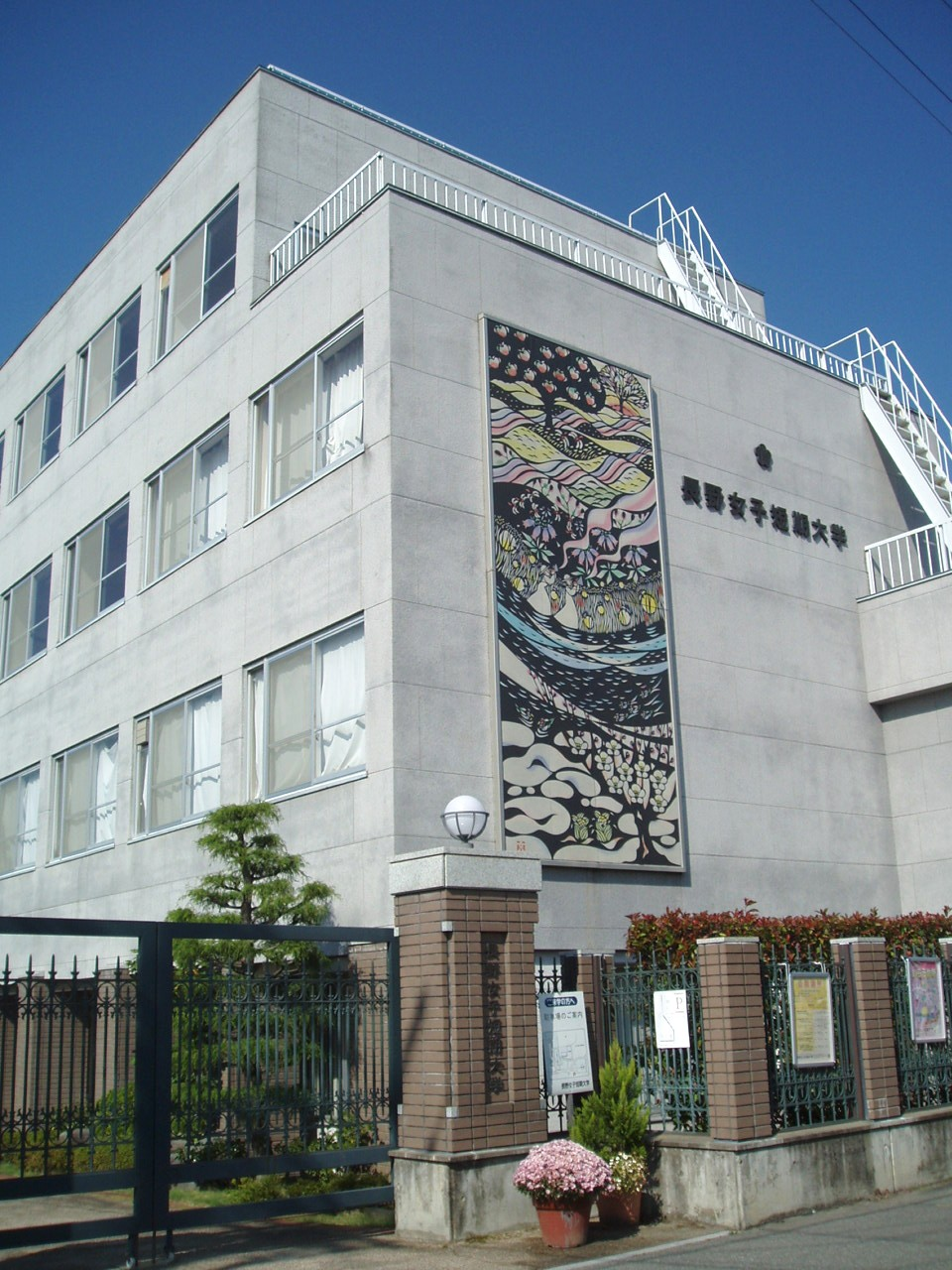
Main gate and Bldg. A

Nagano Junior College (長野短期大学, Nagano tanki daigaku) is a private junior college in Nagano, Nagano, Japan established in 1967. The predecessor of the school was founded in 1925. It used to be Nagano Women's Junior College, but in 2024, it became co-educational and was renamed Nagano Junior College.
