= Nakanomatsukawa Station =

Railway station in Nakano, Nagano Prefecture, Japan

Nakano-Matsukawa Station 中野松川駅
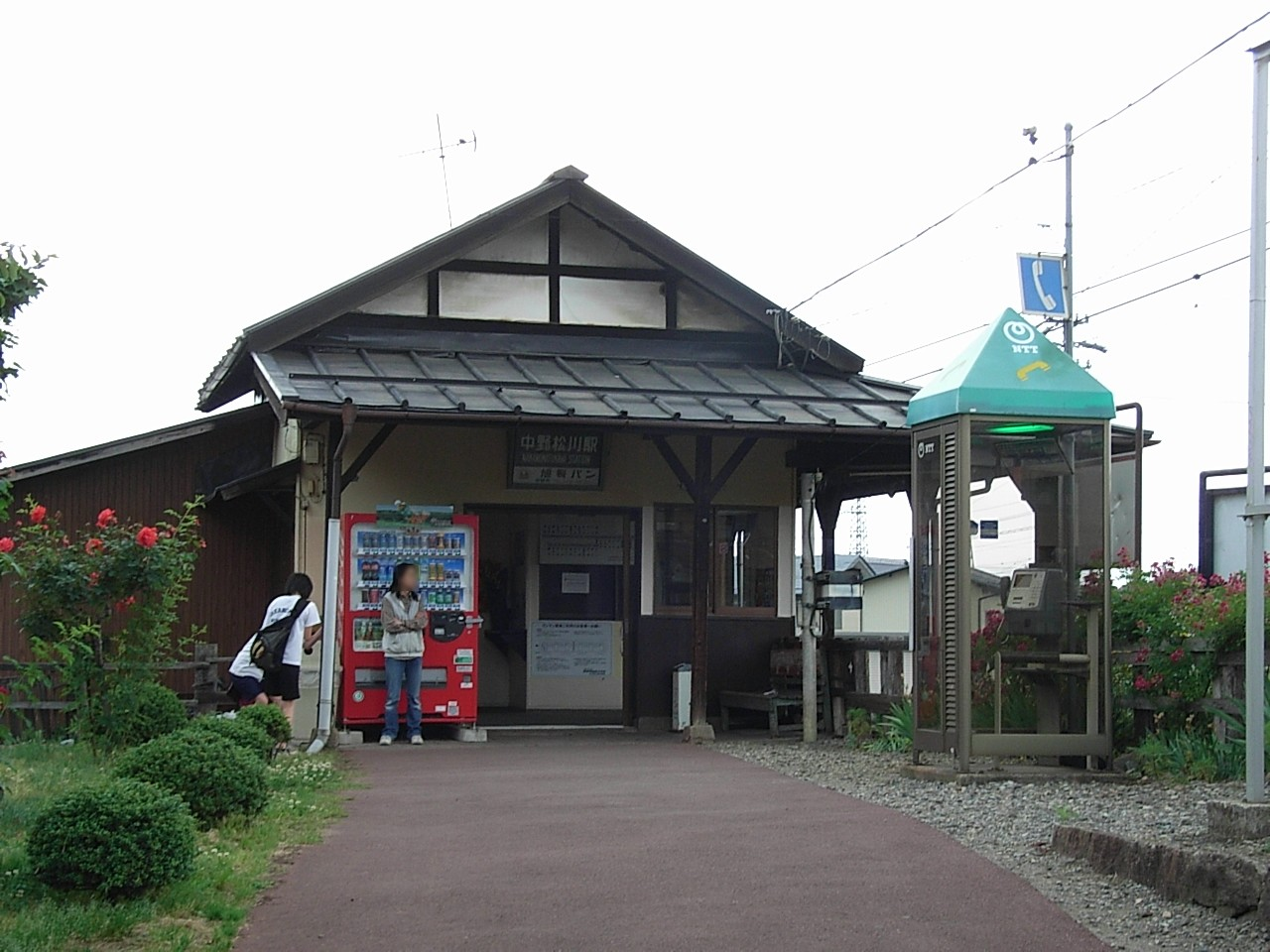
- Nakano-Matsukawa Station in June 2009

General information
- Location: 1840-2 Nakano, Nakano-shi, Nagano-ken 383-0013; Japan
- Coordinates: 36°45′2.0″N 138°22′27.3″E
- Operator: Nagano Electric Railway
- Line: ■ Nagano Electric Railway Nagano Line
- Distance: 27.0 km from Nagano
- Platforms: 1 side platform
- Tracks: 1

Other information
- Station code: N20
- Website: Official website

History
- Opened: 28 April 1927

Passengers
- FY2016: 68 daily
Location
- Location within Nagano Prefecture Location within Japan

Nakano-Matsukawa Station (中野松川駅, Nakanomatsukawa-eki) is a railway station in the city of Nakano, Nagano, Japan, operated by the private railway operating company Nagano Electric Railway.

== Lines ==
Nakano-Matsukawa Station is a station on the Nagano Electric Railway Nagano Line and is 27.0 kilometers from the terminus of the line at Nagano Station.

== Station layout ==
The station consists of one ground-level side platform serving a single bi-directional track. The station is unattended.

== Adjacent stations ==
«	Service	»
Nagano Electric Railway
Express-A: Does not stop at this station
Express-B: Does not stop at this station
Shinshū-Nakano	Local	Shinano-Takehara

== History ==
The station opened on 28 April 1927.

== Passenger statistics ==
In fiscal 2015, the station was used by an average of 68 passengers daily (boarding passengers only).

== Surrounding area ==
- Nakano Elementary School
- Matsukawa Post Office

== See also ==
- List of railway stations in Japan
