= Suzaka Station =

Railway station in Suzaka, Nagano Prefecture, Japan

Suzaka Station 須坂駅
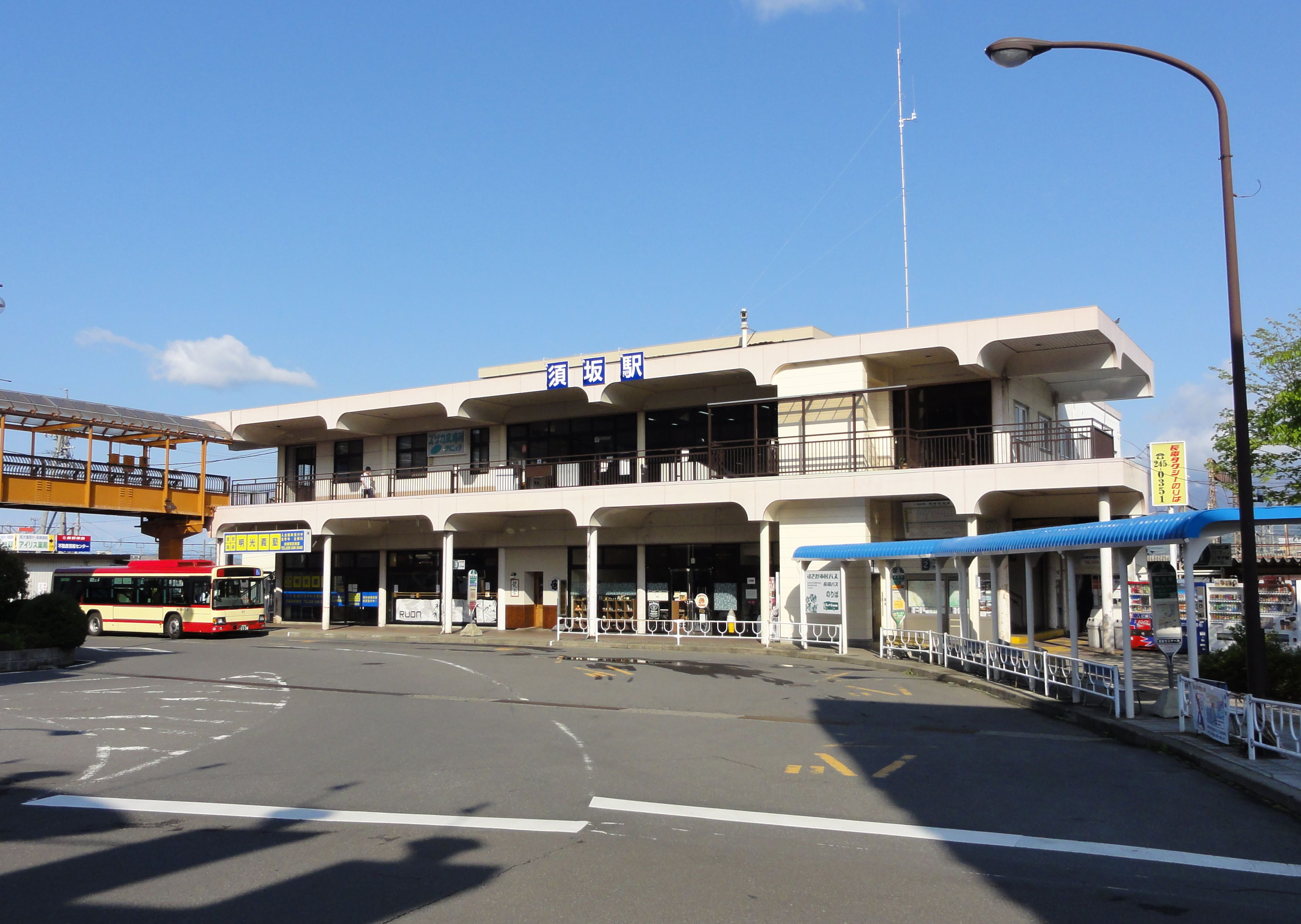
- Suzaka Station in May 2012

General information
- Location: 1288-2 Suzaka, Suzaka-shi, Nagano-ken 382-0000; Japan
- Coordinates: 36°39′25.0″N 138°18′15.3″E
- Operator: Nagano Electric Railway
- Line: ■ Nagano Electric Railway Nagano Line
- Distance: 12.5 km from Nagano
- Platforms: 1 side + 2 island platform
- Tracks: 5

Other information
- Status: Staffed
- Station code: N13
- Website: Official website

History
- Opened: 26 March 1923

Passengers
- FY2016: 3052 daily
Location
- Location within Nagano Prefecture Location within Japan

Suzaka Station (須坂駅, Suzaka-eki) is a railway station in the city of Suzaka, Nagano, Japan, operated by the private railway operating company Nagano Electric Railway.

== Lines ==
Suzaka Station is a station on the Nagano Electric Railway Nagano Line and is 12.5 kilometers from the terminus of the line at Nagano Station.

== Station layout ==
The station consists of one ground-level side platform and two island platforms serving five tracks, with an elevated station building.

=== Platforms ===
1/2	■ Nagano Electric Railway Nagano Line	for Gondō and Nagano
3/4	■ Nagano Electric Railway Nagano Line	for Obuse, Shinshū-Nakano and Yudanaka
5	■ Nagano Electric Railway Nagano Line	(not in use)

== Adjacent stations ==
«	Service	»
Nagano Electric Railway
Gondō	Express-A	Obuse
Asahi	Express-B	Obuse
Hino	Local	Kitasuzaka

== History ==
The station opened on 10 June 1922. From 1922 to 2012, it was also a station on the now-discontinued Kato Line.

== Passenger statistics ==
In fiscal 2016, the station was used by an average of 3052 passengers daily (boarding passengers only).

== Surrounding area ==
- National Route 403
- Suzaka City Hall
- Suzaka Post Office
- Suzaka High School

== See also ==
- List of railway stations in Japan
