= Shinshūnakano Station =

Railway station in Nakano, Nagano Prefecture, Japan

Shinshū-Nakano Station 信州中野駅
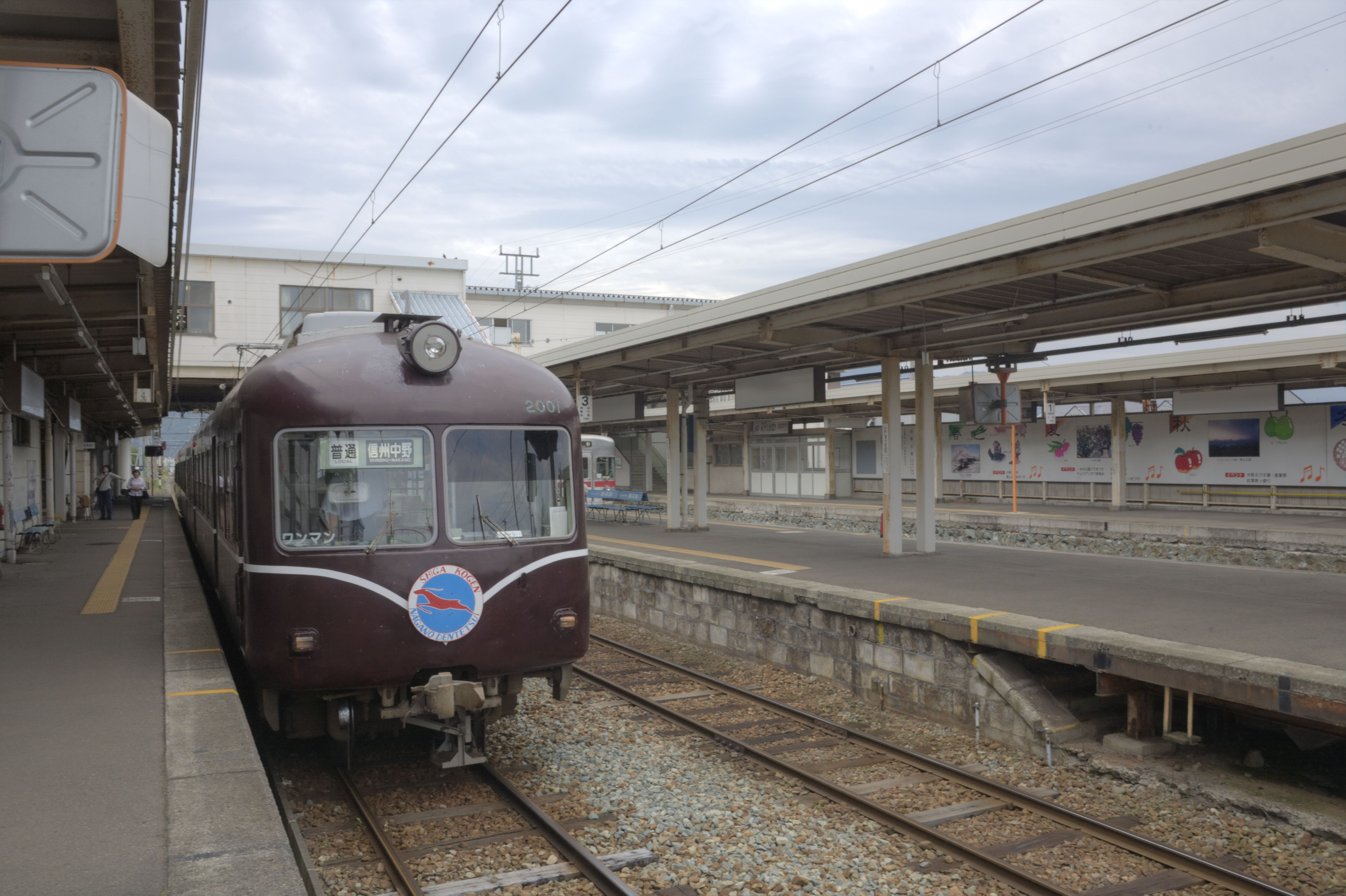
- Shinshū-Nakano Station in November 2016

General information
- Location: 1-1-1 Nishi, Nakano-shi, Nagano-ken 383-0021; Japan
- Coordinates: 36°44′40.0″N 138°21′53.6″E
- Elevation: 376 m (1,234 ft)
- Operator: Nagano Electric Railway
- Line: ■ Nagano Electric Railway Nagano Line
- Distance: 25.6 km from Nagano
- Platforms: 2 side + 1 island platform
- Tracks: 3

Other information
- Status: staffed
- Station code: N19
- Website: Official website

History
- Opened: 26 March 1923

Passengers
- FY2016: 1529 daily
Location
- Location within Nagano Prefecture Location within Japan

Station building

Shinshū-Nakano Station (信州中野駅, Shinshūnakano-eki) is a railway station in the city of Nakano, Nagano, Japan, operated by the private railway operating company Nagano Electric Railway.

== Lines ==
Shinshū-Nakano Station is a station on the Nagano Electric Railway Nagano Line and is 25.6 kilometers from the terminus of the line at Nagano Station.

== Station layout ==
The station consists of one ground-level side platform and one island platform, serving three tracks, with an elevated station building. The station is staffed.

=== Platforms ===
1	■ Nagano Electric Railway Nagano Line	(not in use)
2	■ Nagano Electric Railway Nagano Line	for Obuse, Suzaka and Nagano
3	■ Nagano Electric Railway Nagano Line	for Obuse, Suzaka, Nagano
4	■ Nagano Electric Railway Nagano Line	for Yudanaka

== Adjacent stations ==
«	Service	»
Nagano Electric Railway
Obuse	Express-A	Yudanaka
Obuse	Express-B	Yudanaka
Entoku	Local	Nakano-Matsukawa

== History ==
The station opened on 26 March 1923.

== Passenger statistics ==
In fiscal 2015, the station was used by an average of 1529 passengers daily (boarding passengers only).

== Surrounding area ==
- Nakano City Hall

== See also ==
- List of railway stations in Japan
