= Yudanaka Station =

Railway station in Yamanouchi, Nagano Prefecture, Japan

Yudanaka Station 湯田中駅
- Yudanaka Station in March 2026

General information
- Location: 3227-2 Hirao, Shimotakai-gun Yamanouchi-machi, Nagano-ken 381-0401; Japan
- Coordinates: 36°44′30.0″N 138°24′53.0″E
- Elevation: 499.76 m (1,639.6 ft)
- Operator: Nagano Electric Railway
- Line: ■ Nagano Electric Railway Nagano Line
- Distance: 33.2 km from Nagano
- Platforms: 1 side platform
- Tracks: 1

Other information
- Status: Staffed
- Station code: N24
- Website: Official website

History
- Opened: 28 April 1927

Passengers
- FY2015: 646 daily
Location
- Location within Nagano Prefecture Location within Japan

Yudanaka Station (湯田中駅, Yudanaka-eki) is a railway station in the town of Yamanouchi, Nagano, Japan, operated by the private railway operating company Nagano Electric Railway. Yudanaka Station is a gateway to seasonal mountain and outdoor activities, including hiking and skiing or snowboarding, and to Jigokudani Monkey Park where Japanese macaques soak in an outdoor hot spring.

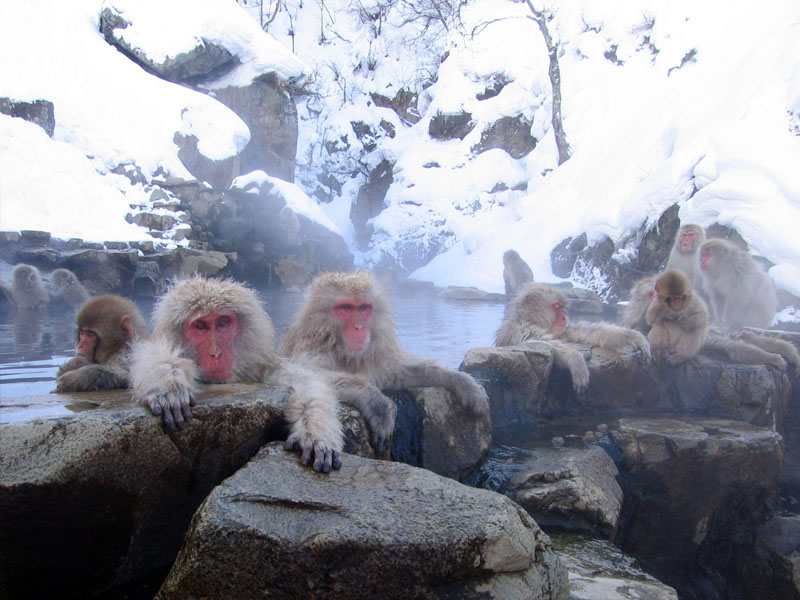
Jigokudani Monkey Park in Yamanouchi

An indoor Japanese hot spring named Kotonoyu (楓の湯) is located in the former station building, standing beside the current station. The former station building itself is registered as tangible cultural property.

At the train's arrival, the song "The beauty of Shigakōgen" (美わしの志賀高原, Biwashi no Shigakōgen), composed by Akira Nishizawa, Masao Koga, and Atsuo Okamoto plays. On departure, a regular train bell rings.

== Lines ==
Yudanaka Station is the terminus of the Nagano Electric Railway Nagano Line and is 33.2 kilometers from the opposing terminus of the line at Nagano Station. Yudanaka is 1.4 km from Kamijō Station, its nearest station on the local line, and 9.9 km from Shinshūnakano Station, its nearest station on the limited express.

== Station layout ==
The station consists of one ground-level side platform serving a single dead-headed track. The station formerly had two opposed side platforms, but one side platform is no longer in use. The staffed station building includes a station office, waiting room, tourist information center, and automatic ticket machines.

== Adjacent stations ==
| « | Service | » |
Nagano Electric Railway
| Shinshū-Nakano | Express-A | Terminus |
| Shinshū-Nakano | Express-B | Terminus |
| Kamijō | Local | Terminus |

== Buses ==
| Name | Via | Destination | Company | Note |
|---|---|---|---|---|
| Express Bus Yudanaka・Nagano - Kyōto・Ōsaka・Kōbe Line | Kyōto Station・Namba Station・Kōbe Station | Universal Studios Japan | Nankai Bus | |
| Kambayashi Line | Shinano-Takehara Station・Nakano-Matsukawa Station | Shinshū-Nakano Station | Nagaden Bus | |
| Kambayashi Line | Andai Onsen・Shibu Onsen | Kambayashi Onsen | Nagaden Bus | |
| Suga・Kadoma Line | Shinano-Takehara Station・Nakano-Matsukawa Station | Shinshū-Nakano Station | Nagaden Bus | |
| Suga・Kadoma Line | Kadoma Onsen | Suga | Nagaden Bus | |
| Shirane Kazan Line | Hasuike | Shirane Kazan | Nagaden Bus | It is possible to transfer onto JR Bus Kusatsu-Shirane Line bound for Kusatsu Onsen Bus Terminal, transfer onto Seibu Bus Asama-Kazan Line bound for Manza-Kazawaguchi Station and transfer onto Kusakaru Kōtsū Kusakaru-Shiranekazan Line bound for Karuizawa Station via Naganohara-Kusatsuguchi Station at the Shirane Kazan bus stop. |
| Okushiga Line | Hasuike・Mount Higashidate・Mount Yakebitai | Okushiga Kōgen Hotel | Nagaden Bus | |

- Shirane Kazan bus stop is closed due to an eruption of Mount Kusatsu-Shirane. It is impossible to transfer onto any bus route at Shirane Kazan bus stop with suspension of Nagaden Bus bound for Shirane Kazan.

== History ==
The station opened on 28 April 1927. Previously, there were plans to extend from Yudanaka a further 2 kilometers to Shibu Onsen (渋温泉). Two stations were built, two licenses were acquired, but the work to lay the rails never commenced. Those licenses expired in 1931 and in 1958.

In January 1937, a Japanese National Railways (JNR) train arrived for the first time via Nagano Station, and in July of the same year a JNR trained arrived via Yashiro Station.

In 1958, the current station building was completed. In 1971, freight operations ended. JNR operated the Shiga train between Yudanaka and Ueno Station in Tokyo using the Shinetsu Line. This service to Yudanaka was discontinued in 1982.

In preparation for the 1998 Winter Olympics, there was an effort to rename the station Shigakogen Station (志賀高原駅 Shigakougen-eki); however, this was withdrawn due to opposition from the Yudanaka Onsen Association.

In 2004, the former station was registered as tangible cultural property.

In 2006, the last mini switchback lines into the station were removed following repairs.

Between 2010 and 2012, the station was operated by Hokushin Sightseeing Taxi (currently Nagaden Taxi).

== Passenger statistics ==
In fiscal 2016, the station was used by an average of 646 passengers daily (boarding passengers only).

| Fiscal year | Daily average |
|---|---|
| 2010 | 557 |
| 2011 | 546 |
| 2012 | 526 |
| 2013 | 540 |
| 2014 | 543 |
| 2015 | 646 |

== Gallery ==
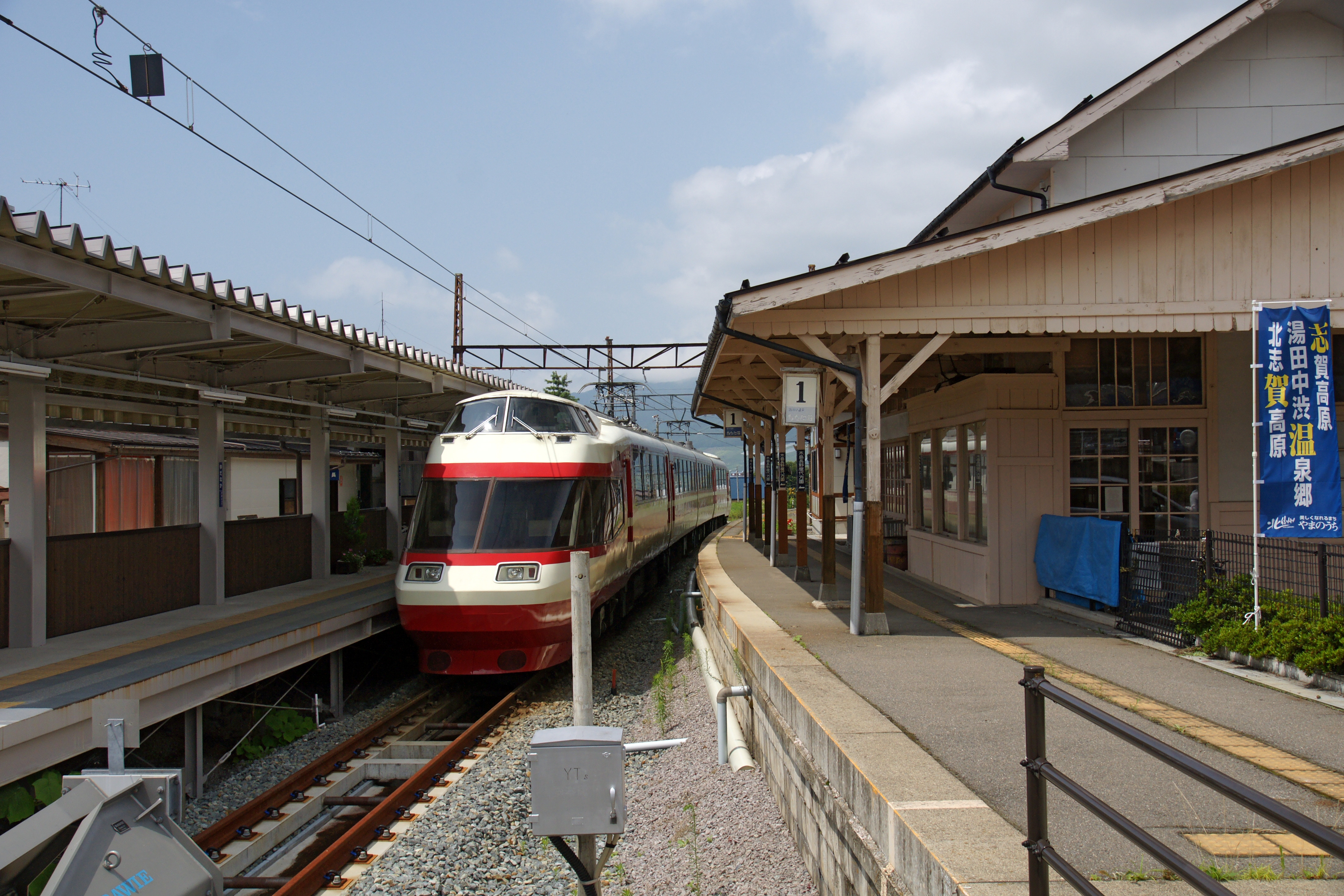
Platform

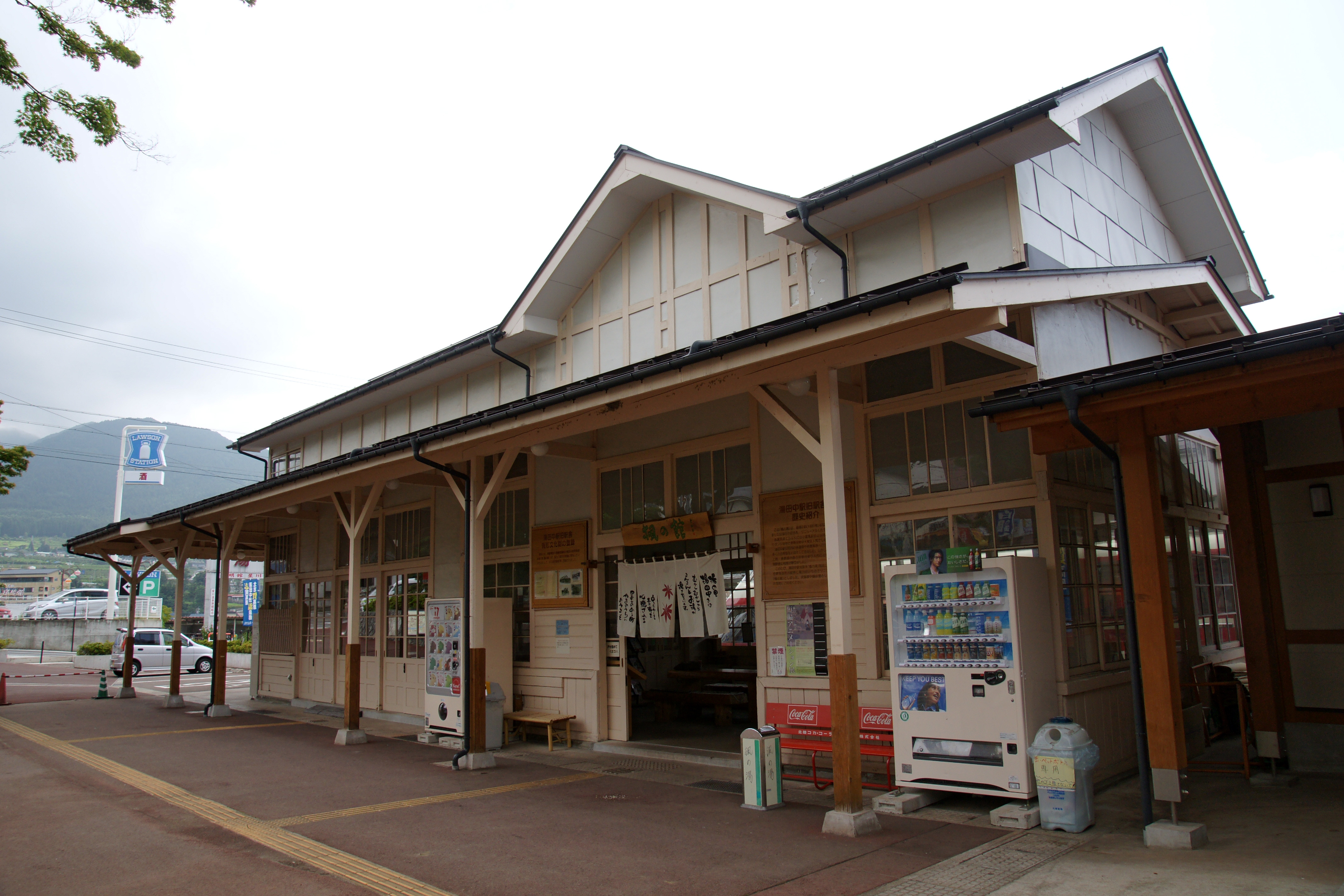
Original station building

== Surrounding area ==
- Yudanaka Onsen
- Yamanouchi Town Hall
- Yamanouchi Middle School
- Yudanaka Post Office

== See also ==
- List of railway stations in Japan
