= Mount Neko =

Stratovolcano on the island of Honshu, Japan

- 根子岳
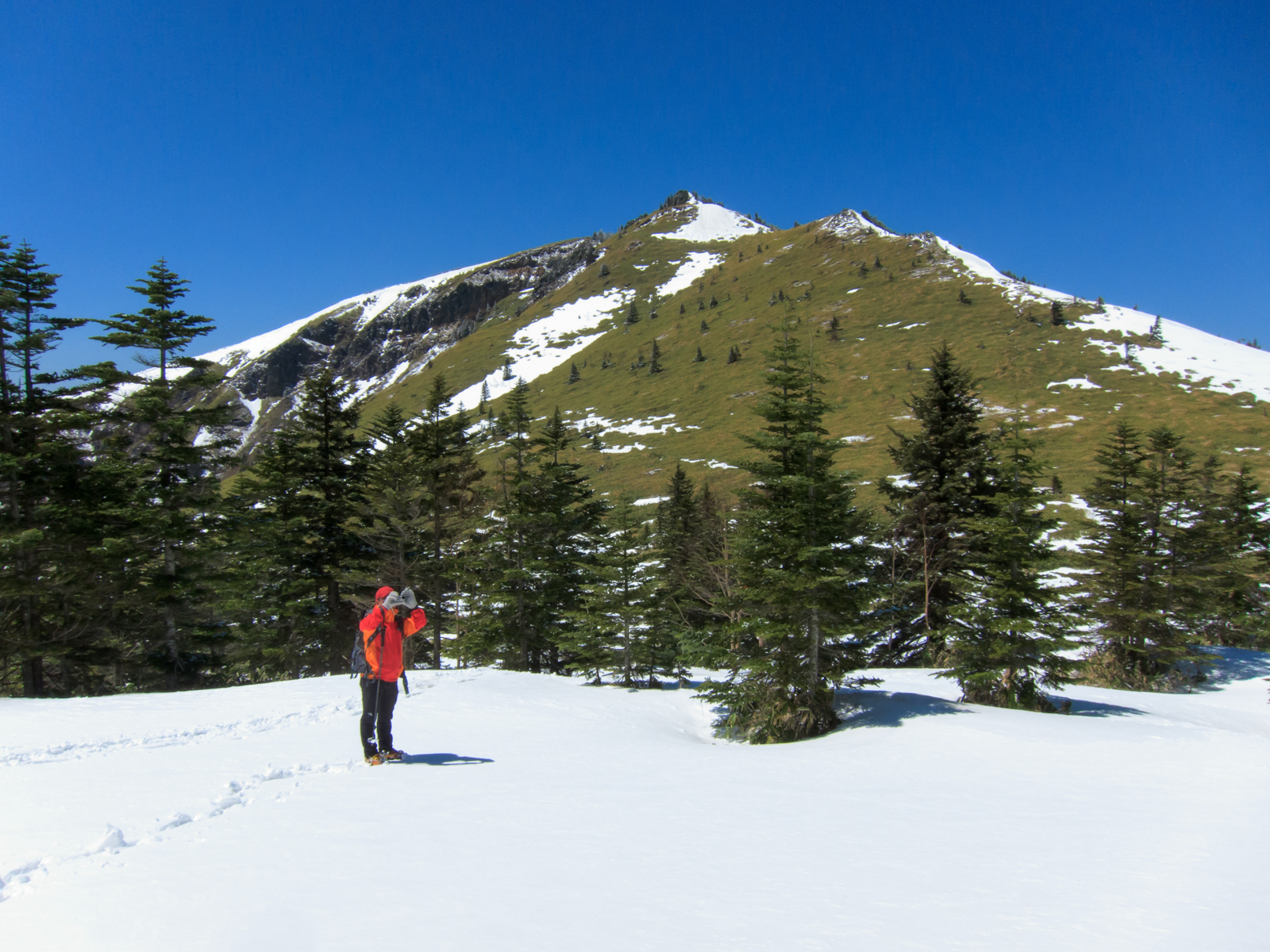

Highest point
- Elevation: 2,207 m (7,241 ft)
- Prominence: 568 m (1,864 ft)
- Listing: 100 Flower Mountains in Japan
- Coordinates: 36°32′57″N 138°23′43″E

Naming
- English translation: root mountain
- Language of name: Japanese

Geography
- Location within Japan
- Location: Nagano Prefecture, Chūbu region, Honshū, Japan
- Parent range: Mount Azumaya

Geology
- Mountain type: Stratovolcano

Climbing
- Easiest route: Hike

Mount Neko (根子岳, Neko-dake) is a mountain in Jōshin'etsu-kōgen National Park with an elevation of 2,207 m (7,241 ft), located near Ueda and Suzaka in Nagano Prefecture, Japan. It is one of the "100 famous flower mountains of Japan" (花の百名山, Hana no hyaku meizan) because of the flowers of Parnassia palustris which bloom in September. Along with Mount Azumaya, Mount Neko is one of the Shinshu Hometown 120 Mountains (信州ふるさと120山, Shinshuu furusato hyaku ni juu san) published by The Shinano Mainichi Shimbun. The mountain should not be confused with a similarly named Mount Neko (根子岳) in Kumamoto Prefecture.

Mount Neko forms the western peak along the rim of the Azumaya Volcano (四阿火山, Azumaya-kazan) caldera. This volcano was active 900,000–300,000 years ago. Other peaks on the caldera are Mount Azumaya (2,354 m (7,723 ft)) to the south, Mount Urakura (浦倉山, Urakura-yama) (2,091 m (6,860 ft)) to the east, and Mount Kimyō (奇妙山, Kimyō-san) (1,629 m (5,344 ft)) to the north. Mount Azumaya is one of the 100 Famous Japanese Mountains.

== Mountain Climbing ==
Ascent

- One of the most frequently used trails begins at Sugadaira Farm (1,592 m (5,223 ft)). From there, it is approximately 30 minutes to a birch forest, then one hour through the forest, and another 30 minutes from the tree line to the summit.

Descent

- From the summit, it is approximately 75 minutes to the trailhead.

The total ascent and descent walking distance is 5.8 km (3.6 mi). The trail is well-maintained and well-signed, there are no chains or ladders on the trail, and little technical skill is required. According to the "Nagano Trail Guide by Grade", it is one of the easiest mountains in Nagano Prefecture to climb. There is a public toilet beside the trailhead, and across the road is a small shop, selling ice cream from Sugadaira Farm.

The mountain forms part of Sugadaira Snow Resort (菅平高原スノーリゾート, Sugadaira Suno- rizo-to). In winter, it is possible to ride a snowcat to an altitude of 2,170 m (7,120 ft), just below the summit, to see "snow monsters" formed from the hard rime phenomenon. Especially in winter, the summit provides a 360° panoramic view of the Northern Alps; from here, 30 of Japan's 100 Famous Mountains are visible, including Mount Azumaya, Mount Asama, Mount Fuji, Mount Aka, Mount Kita, Mount Hotakadake, Mount Jōnen, Mount Yari, Mount Shirouma, Mount Takatsuma, and Mount Hiuchi.

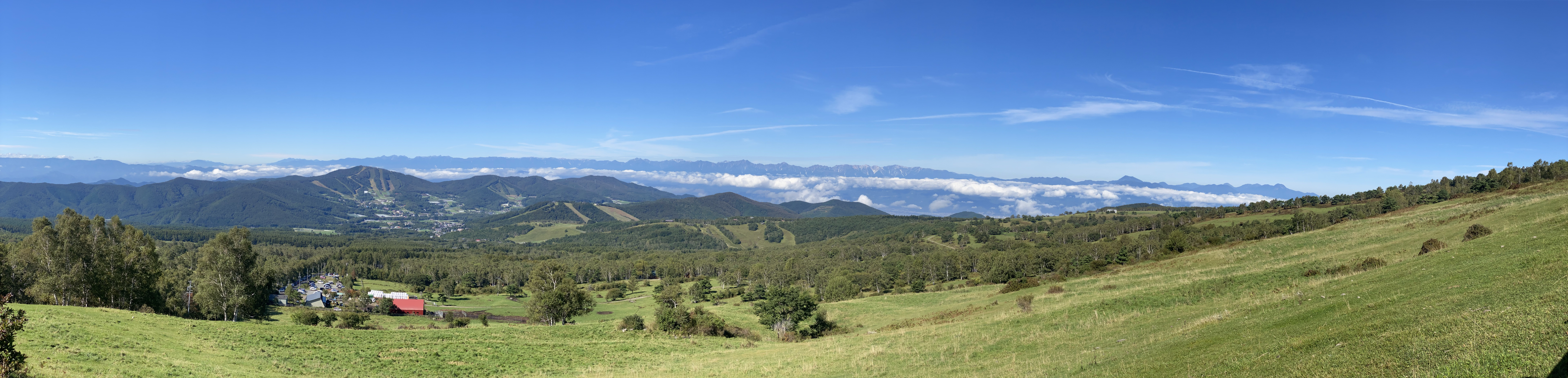
Panorama of the Northern Japanese Alps from Mount Neko, with the Sugadaira Farm and Sugadaira Highlands in the foreground

== Yonako Falls ==
Yonako Falls (米子大瀑布, Yonako Dai-Bakufu) is the name for two separate waterfalls: Fudo Falls (不動滝, Fudo no taki), which originates on Mount Neko; and Gongen Falls (権現滝, Gongen no taki), which originates on Mount Azumaya. Both falls combine to form the Yonako River, a tributary of the Chikuma River, Japan's longest river. Yonako Falls is located in Yonako, Suzaka City, and is listed as one of "Japan’s Top 100 Waterfalls" according to the Japanese Ministry of the Environment.

== Access ==
Car

- From the Ueda Interchange on the Jōshin-etsu Expressway, it is approximately 25 km (16 mi) via Route 144 and then Route 406.
- From the Suzaka Interchange on the Jōshin-etsu Expressway, it is approximately 23 km (14 mi) via Route 403 and then Route 406.

Bus

- From Bus Platform #3 at Ueda Station (Nagano), the Ueda Bus Line (上田バス, Ueda Basu) runs a bus service to the Sugadaira Highland on the Sugadaira Kogen Line (菅平高原線, Sugidaira kōgen sen). This service takes approximately 1 hour and leaves several times a day from Ueda Station. In Sugadaira, the closest bus stop to the trailhead is the Davos bus stop (ダボスバス停, Davos basu tei).

== Gallery ==
Mount Neko
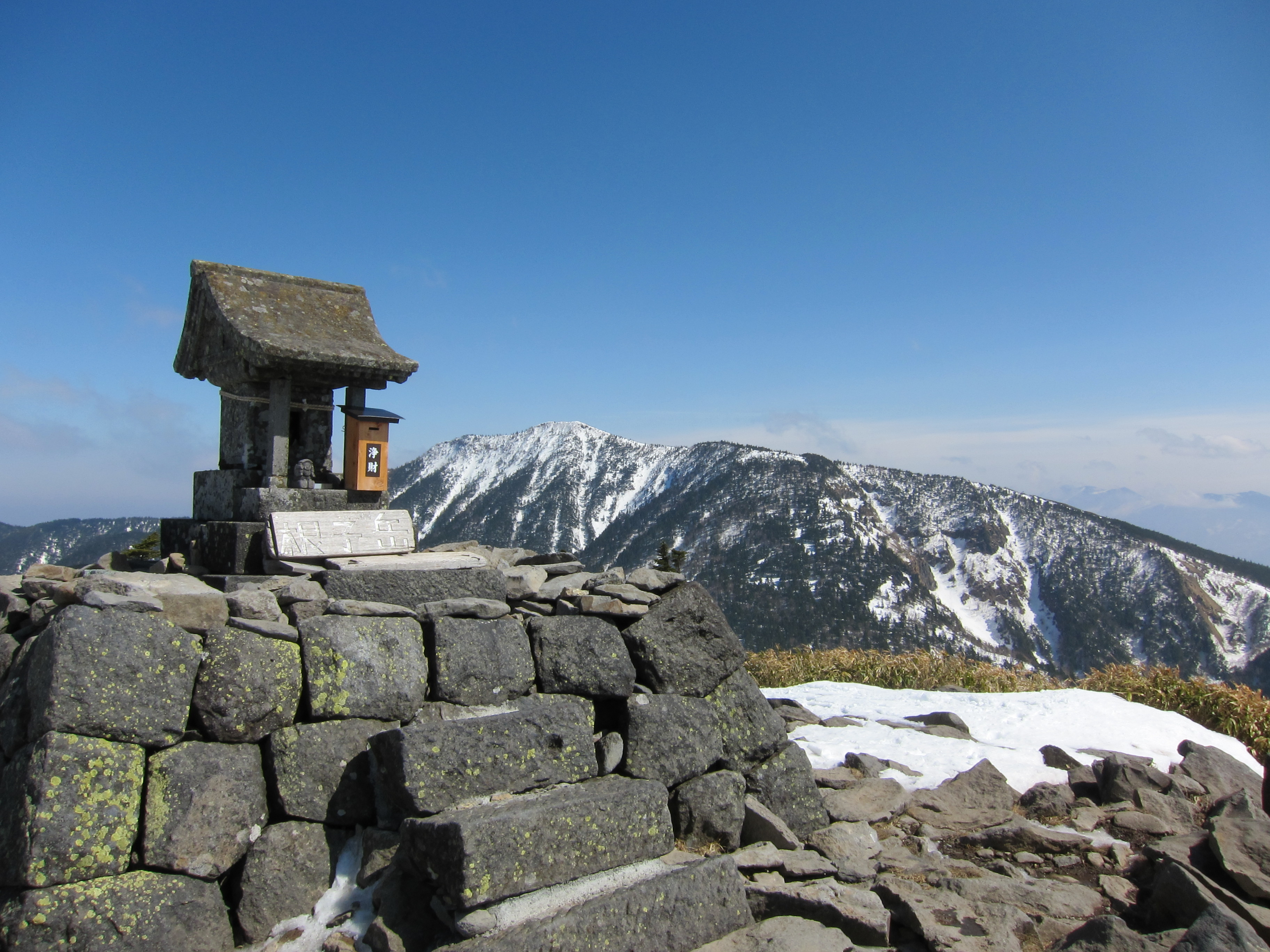
Summit of Mount Neko with Mount Azumaya in the background

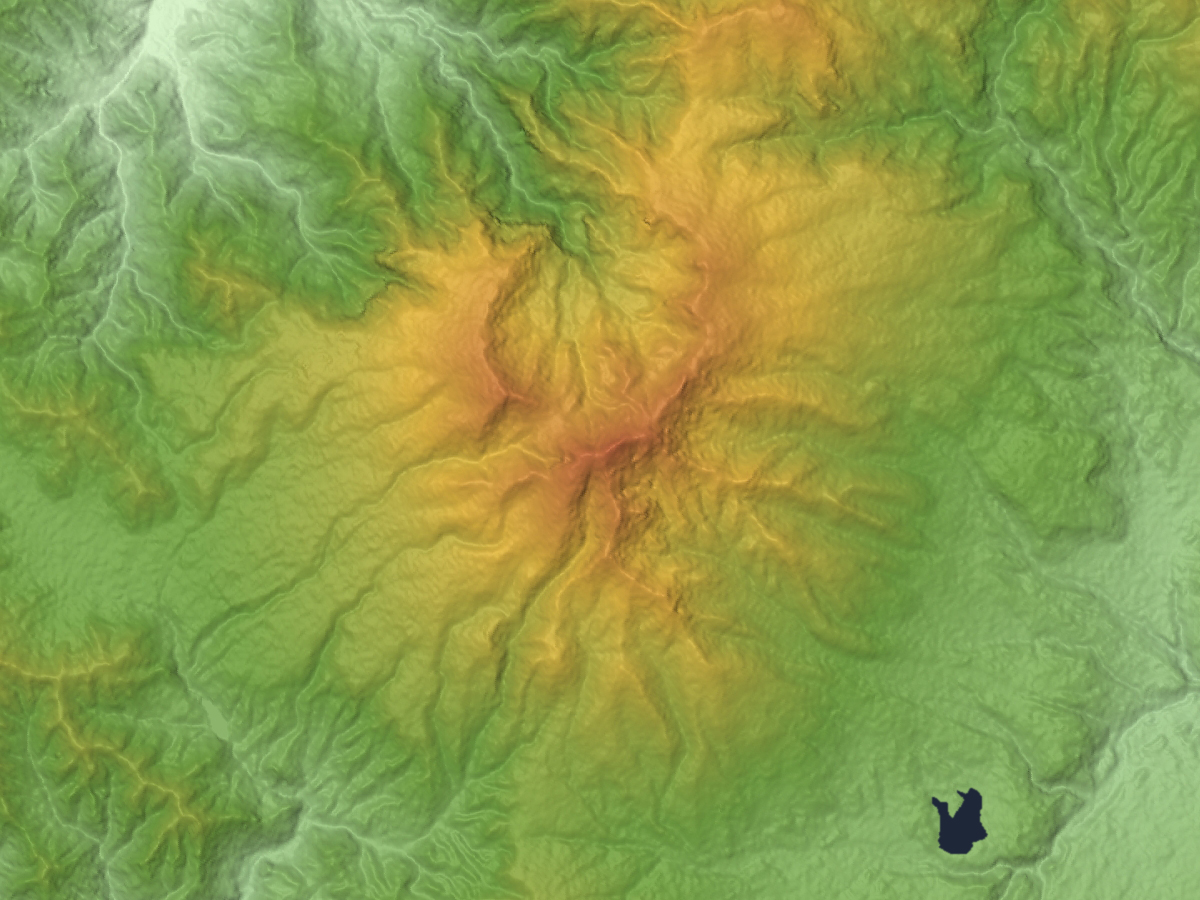
Azumaya Volcano with Mount Neko (west) and Mount Azumaya (south)

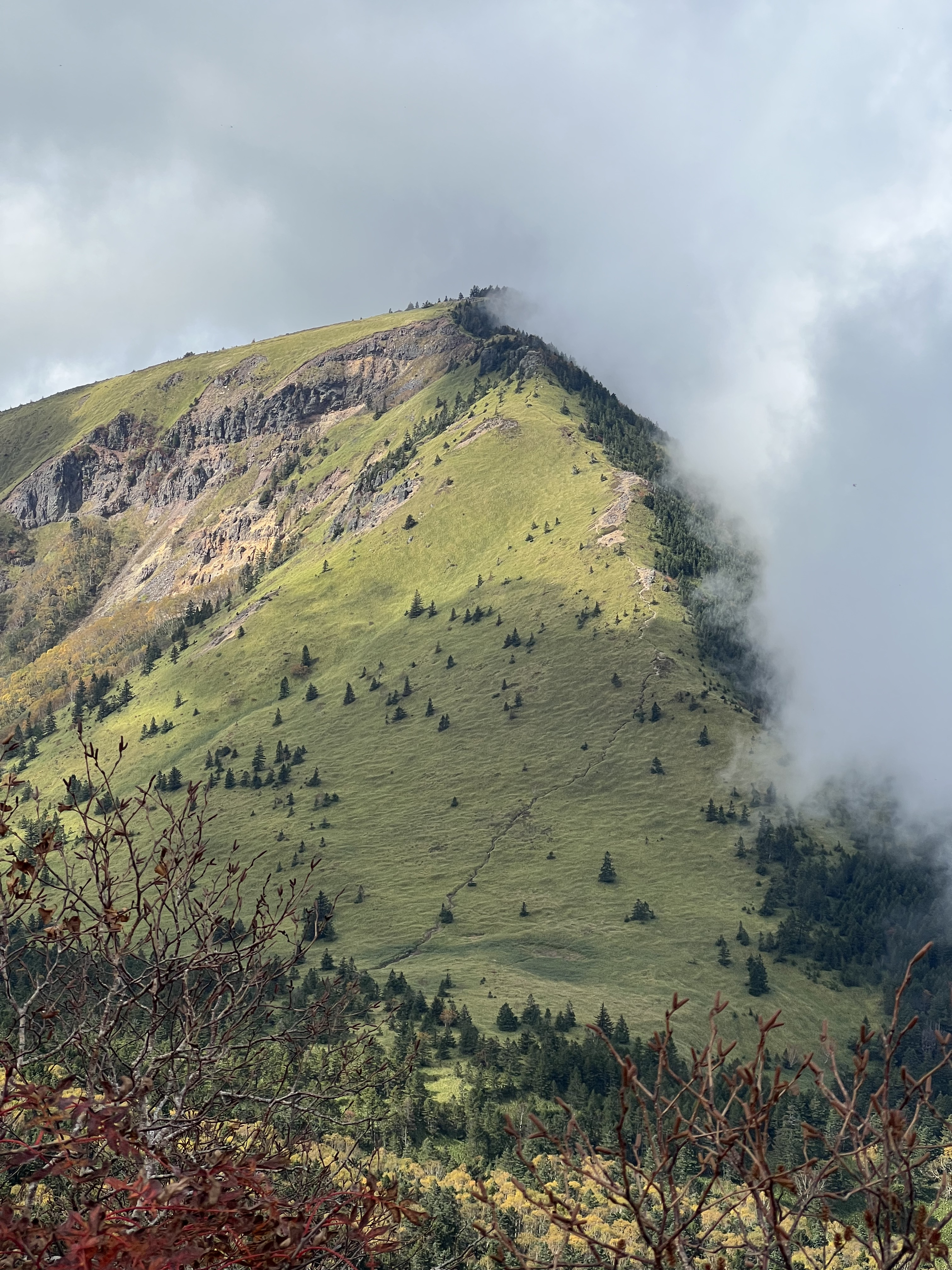
Mount Neko seen from Mount Azumaya, autumn

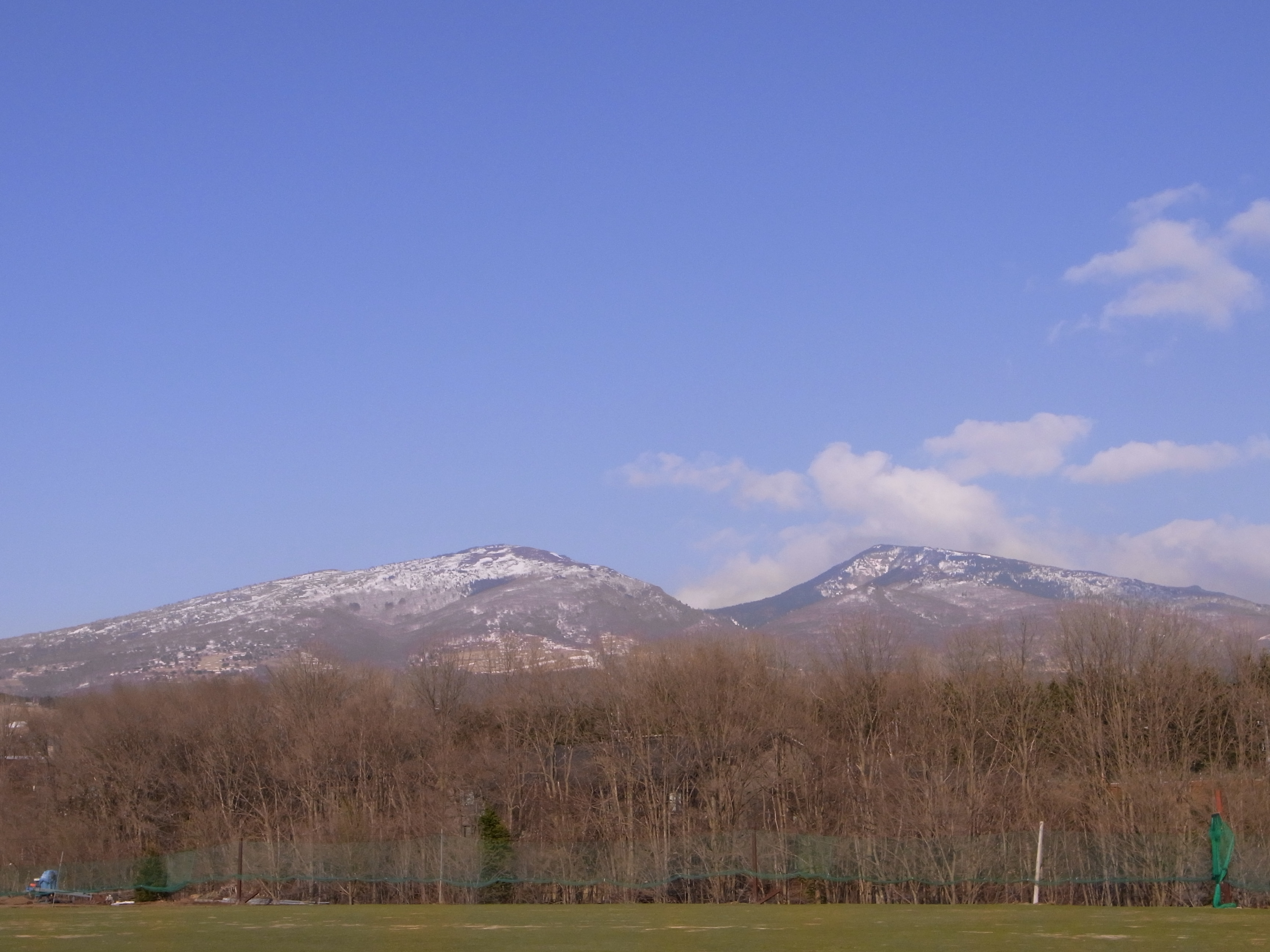
Mount Neko (left) and Mount Azumaya, spring

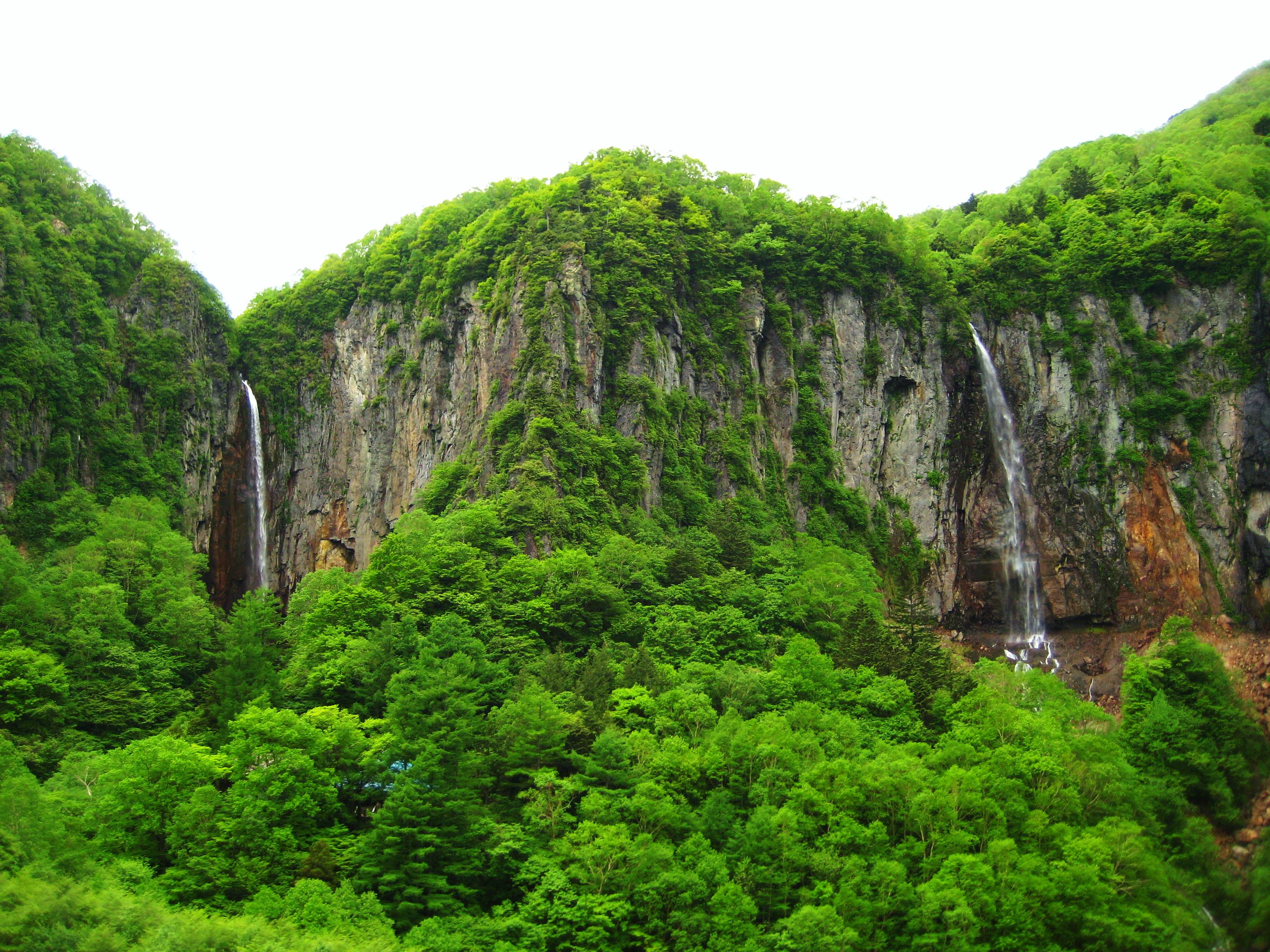
Yonako Falls: Gongen Falls (L) from Mt. Azumaya and Fudo Falls (R) from Mt. Neko

== See also ==
- List of volcanoes in Japan
- List of mountains in Japan
- Mount Azumaya
