= Yonako Falls =

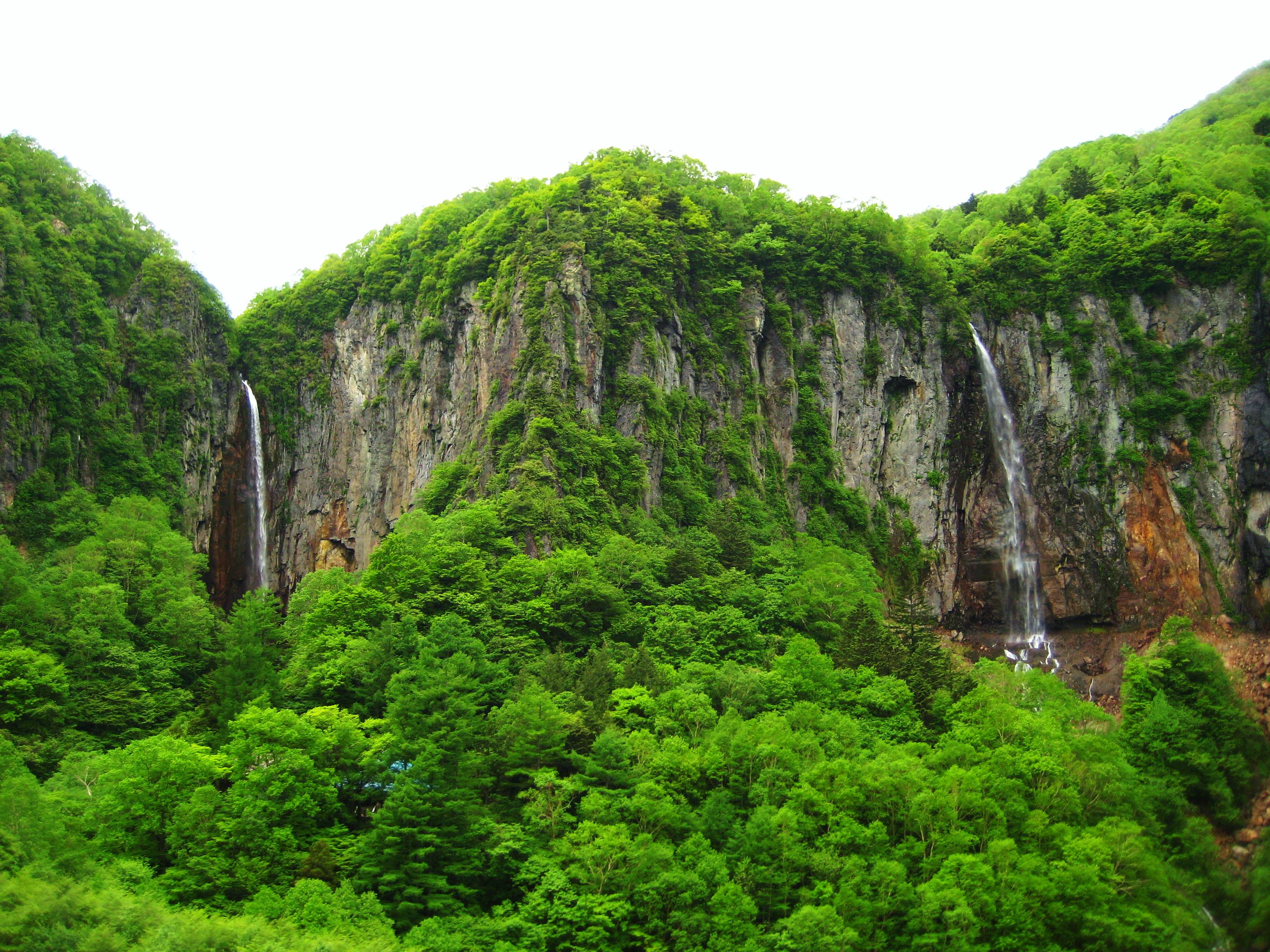
- Yonako Falls: Gongen Falls (left, 75 m; 246 ft) and Fudo Falls (85 m; 279 ft)

- Location within Nagano Prefecture Location within Japan
- Location: Suzaka, Nagano Prefecture, Japan
- Coordinates: 36.5667°N 138.4058°E
- Total height: 85 m (279 ft)
- Average width: 6 m (20 ft)
- Watercourse: Chikuma River

Yonako Falls (米子大瀑布, Yonako Dai-Bakufu), literally "Yonako Large Waterfalls" ) is a waterfall located in Yonako, Suzaka City, Nagano Prefecture, in the central part of Japan. The falls originate from Mount Azumaya and Mount Neko.

== The Falls ==
The Yonako Falls, located in Suzaka, Nagano, Japan is a collective name of two waterfalls: the Fudo Falls (不動滝, Fudo no taki) and the Gongen Falls (権現滝, Gongen no taki). Both falls combine to make the Yonako River, which is one of the tributaries of the Chikuma River, the upper stream of Japan's longest river, the Shinano River, which flows into the Sea of Japan at Niigata City.

Yonako Falls is one of "Japan’s Top 100 Waterfalls", in a listing published by the Japanese Ministry of the Environment in 1990.

The view of the falls, 900 metres (3,000 ft) away from the slag ground of the former Yonako Sulfur Mines (Japanese: 米子硫黄鉱山), which has been converted to a park, is said to be excellent, especially during the autumn leaves season.

== Access ==
From Suzaka-Nagano East exit of the Jōshin-etsu Expressway, via National Routes 403 and 406, to the falls' toll-free parking lot is about 40 minutes.

== See also ==
- List of waterfalls
- List of waterfalls in Japan
