= Tsumagoi =

Tsumagoi 嬬恋村
- Village
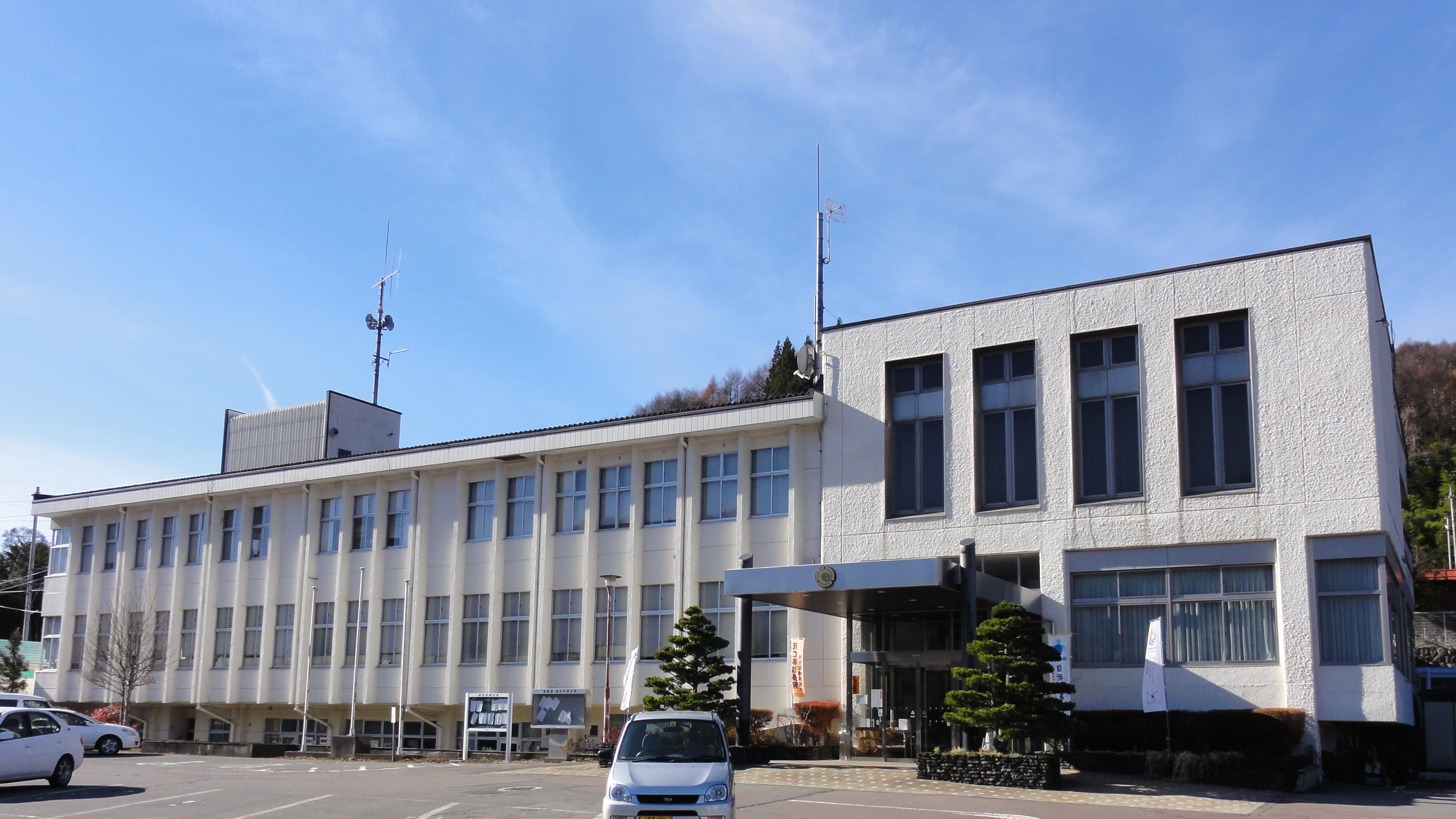
- Tsumagoi village office

- Flag Seal

- Location of Tsumagoi in Gunma Prefecture

- Coordinates: 36°31′0.6″N 138°31′48.5″E
- Country: Japan
- Region: Kantō
- Prefecture: Gunma
- District: Agatsuma

Area
  - Total: 337.58 km^{2} (130.34 sq mi)

Population (September 2020)
  - Total: 9,546
  - Density: 28.28/km^{2} (73.24/sq mi)
- Time zone: UTC+9 (Japan Standard Time)
- Tree: Silver birch
- Flower: Japanese Gentian
- Fish: Oncorhynchus masou
- Phone number: 0279-96-0511
- Address: 110 Ōmae, Tsumagoi-mura, Agatsuma-gun, Gunma-ken 377-1692
- Website: Official website

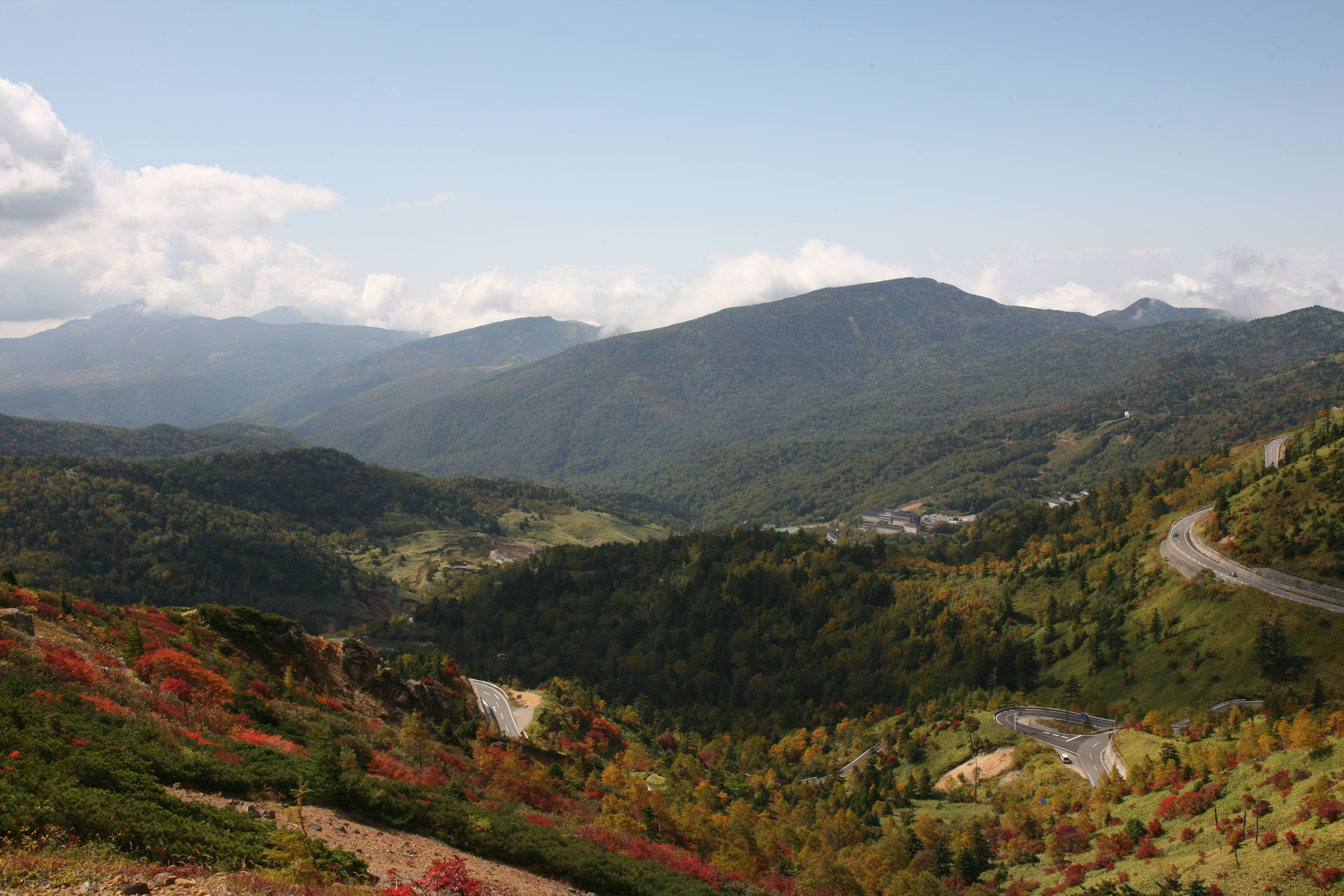
Manza Onsen area seen from Mount Kusatsu-Shirane

Tsumagoi (嬬恋村, Tsumagoi-mura) is a village located in Gunma Prefecture, Japan. As of 1 September 2020, the village had an estimated population of 9,546 in 3,999 households, and a population density of 28 persons per km^{2}. The total area of the village is 337.51 square kilometres (130.31 sq mi).

== Geography ==
Tsumagoi is situated on the northwestern corner of Gunma Prefecture, touching Nagano Prefecture to the north, south, and west. Because of its elevated location and the ash deposits of Mount Asama, Tsumagoi is well known for growing cabbages. Parts of the village are within the borders of then Jōshin'etsu-kōgen National Park.

- Mountains: Mount Asama (2568m), Mount Motoshirane (2171m), Mount Kusatsu-Shirane (2160m), Mount Azumaya (2354m)
- Rivers: Agatsuma River
- Lakes: Lake Baragi, Lake Tashiro

=== Surrounding municipalities ===
Gunma Prefecture

- Kusatsu
- Naganohara

Nagano Prefecture

- Karuizawa
- Komoro
- Miyota
- Suzaka
- Takayama
- Tōmi
- Ueda

== Climate ==
Tsumagoi has a humid continental climate (Köppen Dfb) characterized by warm summers and cold winters with heavy snowfall, due to the high elevation. Winters are cold, with a January 24-hour average temperature of −4.6 °C (23.7 °F), while summers are warm and wet, with a July 24-hour average temperature of 19.5 °C (67.1 °F). The average annual rainfall is 1,503 mm (59.17 in) with September as the wettest month.

Climate data for Tashiro, Tsumagoi (1991–2020 normals, extremes 1977–present)
Month	Jan	Feb	Mar	Apr	May	Jun	Jul	Aug	Sep	Oct	Nov	Dec	Year
Record high °C (°F)	12.0 (53.6)	15.2 (59.4)	19.2 (66.6)	25.9 (78.6)	27.7 (81.9)	31.0 (87.8)	31.0 (87.8)	30.3 (86.5)	29.7 (85.5)	25.2 (77.4)	21.6 (70.9)	16.6 (61.9)	31.0 (87.8)
Mean daily maximum °C (°F)	−0.5 (31.1)	0.6 (33.1)	4.6 (40.3)	11.5 (52.7)	16.9 (62.4)	19.7 (67.5)	23.7 (74.7)	24.3 (75.7)	19.8 (67.6)	14.4 (57.9)	9.0 (48.2)	2.7 (36.9)	12.2 (54.0)
Daily mean °C (°F)	−4.5 (23.9)	−4.0 (24.8)	−0.4 (31.3)	5.7 (42.3)	11.2 (52.2)	14.9 (58.8)	19.1 (66.4)	19.6 (67.3)	15.5 (59.9)	9.5 (49.1)	3.8 (38.8)	−1.6 (29.1)	7.4 (45.3)
Mean daily minimum °C (°F)	−8.9 (16.0)	−9.0 (15.8)	−5.4 (22.3)	0.3 (32.5)	5.7 (42.3)	10.6 (51.1)	15.3 (59.5)	15.8 (60.4)	11.8 (53.2)	5.1 (41.2)	−0.7 (30.7)	−5.9 (21.4)	2.9 (37.2)
Record low °C (°F)	−16.5 (2.3)	−17.2 (1.0)	−14.5 (5.9)	−10.0 (14.0)	−6.3 (20.7)	1.8 (35.2)	7.0 (44.6)	4.7 (40.5)	−0.1 (31.8)	−4.3 (24.3)	−10.4 (13.3)	−15.1 (4.8)	−17.2 (1.0)
Average precipitation mm (inches)	52.4 (2.06)	55.5 (2.19)	96.4 (3.80)	107.9 (4.25)	132.0 (5.20)	180.0 (7.09)	207.5 (8.17)	165.2 (6.50)	220.2 (8.67)	167.8 (6.61)	72.2 (2.84)	46.2 (1.82)	1,503.2 (59.18)
Average precipitation days (≥ 1.0 mm)	7.7	7.7	10.4	10.3	11.4	14.8	16.4	14.0	13.2	10.3	7.4	7.6	131.0
Mean monthly sunshine hours	131.9	146.5	180.4	196.7	201.5	138.7	137.5	144.4	109.6	134.5	149.0	127.4	1,798.1
Source: Japan Meteorological Agency (1991–2020 normals, extremes 1977–present)

== Demographics ==
Per Japanese census data, the population of Tsumagoi has recently decreased after several decades of relative stability.

Tsumagoi has been recognized by Japan's Office for the Promotion of Regional Revitalization (Kishida Cabinet Secretariat), which promotes the development of new technologies to combat depopulation, for meeting a "high standard" (高水準) of digital transformation/telework infrastructure. Related projects have been awarded over ¥7.0M in government grants.

Historical population
Year	Pop.	±%
1920	6,359	—
1930	9,502	+49.4%
1940	9,685	+1.9%
1950	13,757	+42.0%
1960	15,214	+10.6%
1970	12,074	−20.6%
1980	10,737	−11.1%
1990	10,957	+2.0%
2000	10,657	−2.7%
2010	10,183	−4.4%
2020	8,850	−13.1%

== History ==
Numerous Jōmon period remains have been found in Tsumagoi, although later Yayoi period artifacts are almost non-existent, as the area is not suitable for rice cultivation. During the Edo period, the area around Tsumagoi was part of the hatamoto-administered territory within Kōzuke Province. Kanbara area (鎌原村) was severely damaged by the Tenmei eruption of Mt. Asama in 1783 (477 people died). With the creation of the modern municipalities system after the Meiji Restoration on April 1, 1889, the village of Tsumagoi was created within Agatsuma District of Gunma Prefecture.

== Government ==
Tsumagoi has a mayor-council form of government with a directly elected mayor and a unicameral village council of 12 members. Tsumagoi collectively with the other municipalities in Agatsuma District, contributes two members to the Gunma Prefectural Assembly. In terms of national politics, the village is part of Gunma 5th district of the lower house of the Diet of Japan.

== Economy ==
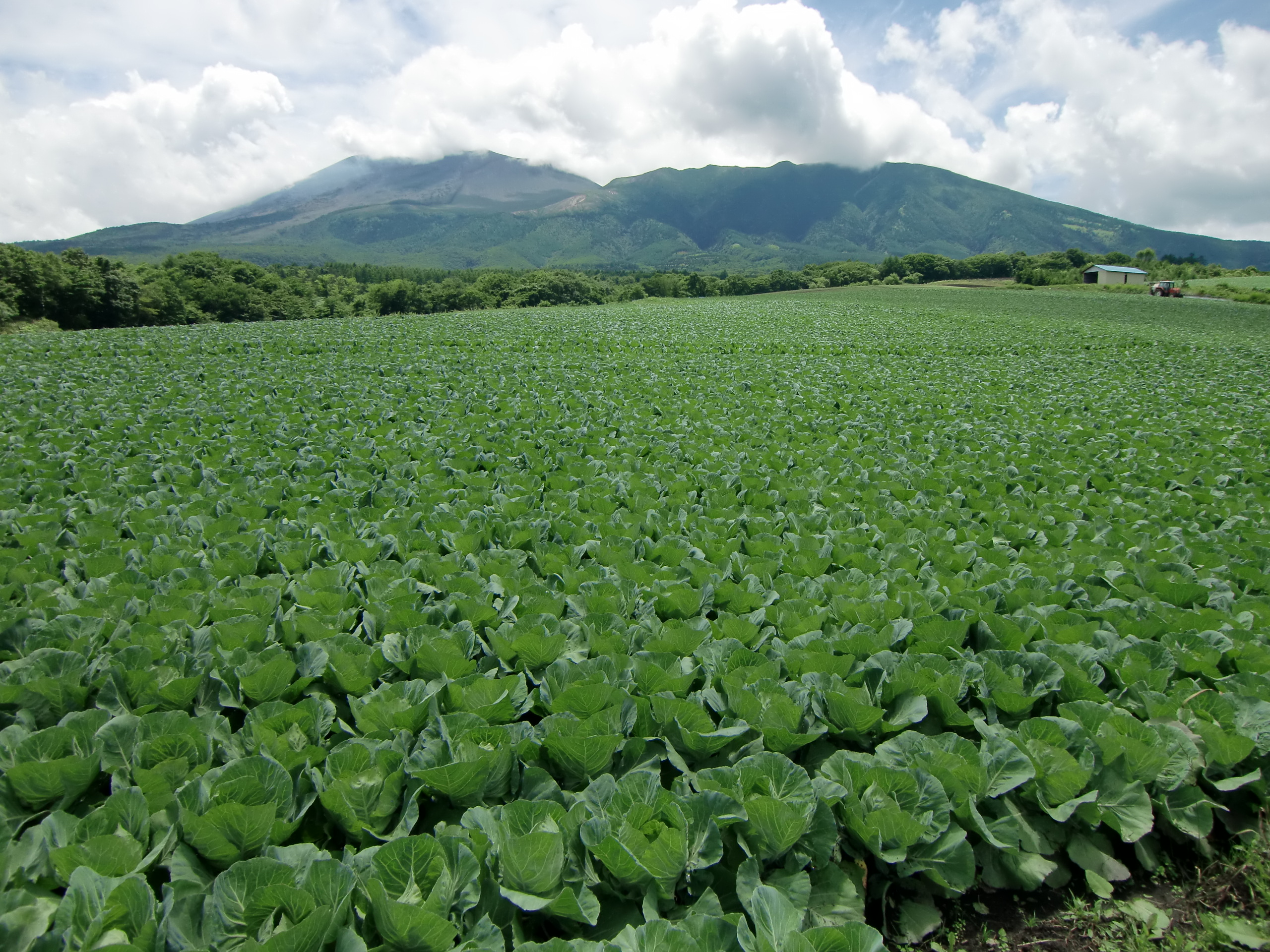
Tsumagoi cabbage field and Mount Asama

The economy of Tsumagoi is primarily agricultural, with cabbage forming the most noted local crop. Seasonal tourism primarily in connection with its onsen hot spring resorts and ski resorts are also major contributors to the local economy.

In May 2025, the Tsumagoi Battery Storage Station, a grid-connected lithium-ion battery facility with an output of 2.0 MW and a storage capacity of 9.3 MWh, began commercial operation in the village. The facility is operated by Tsumagoi Battery Storage Station LLC, which was jointly established by Tokyo Electric Power Company Holdings (TEPCO) and NTT Anode Energy.

== Education ==
Tsumagoi has two public elementary schools and one public middle school operated by the town government, and one public high school operated by the Gunma Prefectural Board of Education.

=== Senior high schools ===
- Tsumagoi High School

=== Junior high schools ===
- Tsumagoi Junior High School

=== Elementary schools ===
- Higashi Elementary School
- Nishi Elementary School

== Transportation ==
=== Railway ===
JR East – Agatsuma Line

- Fukurogura - Manza-Kazawaguchi - Ōmae

=== Highway ===
- National Route 144
- National Route 146
- National Route 292
- National Route 406

== Local attractions ==
The main draw of tourists to Tsumagoi are the onsen (natural hot spring) resorts, some of which are also associated with ski resorts. There are two major hot spring resort areas within the town.

- Handeki Onsen
- Kazawa Onsen and ski resort
- Manza Onsen and ski resort
- Palcall Tsumagoi Mountain Resort
- Tsumagoi Onsen

== Noted people from Tsumagoi ==
- Masato Kobayashi, professional baseball player
- Akira Kuroiwa, Olympic gold medalist speed skater
- Toshiyuki Kuroiwa, Olympic silver medalist speed skater
