= Murayama Station =

Murayama Station is the name of two train stations in Japan:

- Murayama Station (Nagano)
- Murayama Station (Yamagata)
