= Hino Station (Nagano) =

Railway station in Suzaka, Nagano Prefecture, Japan

Hino Station 日野駅
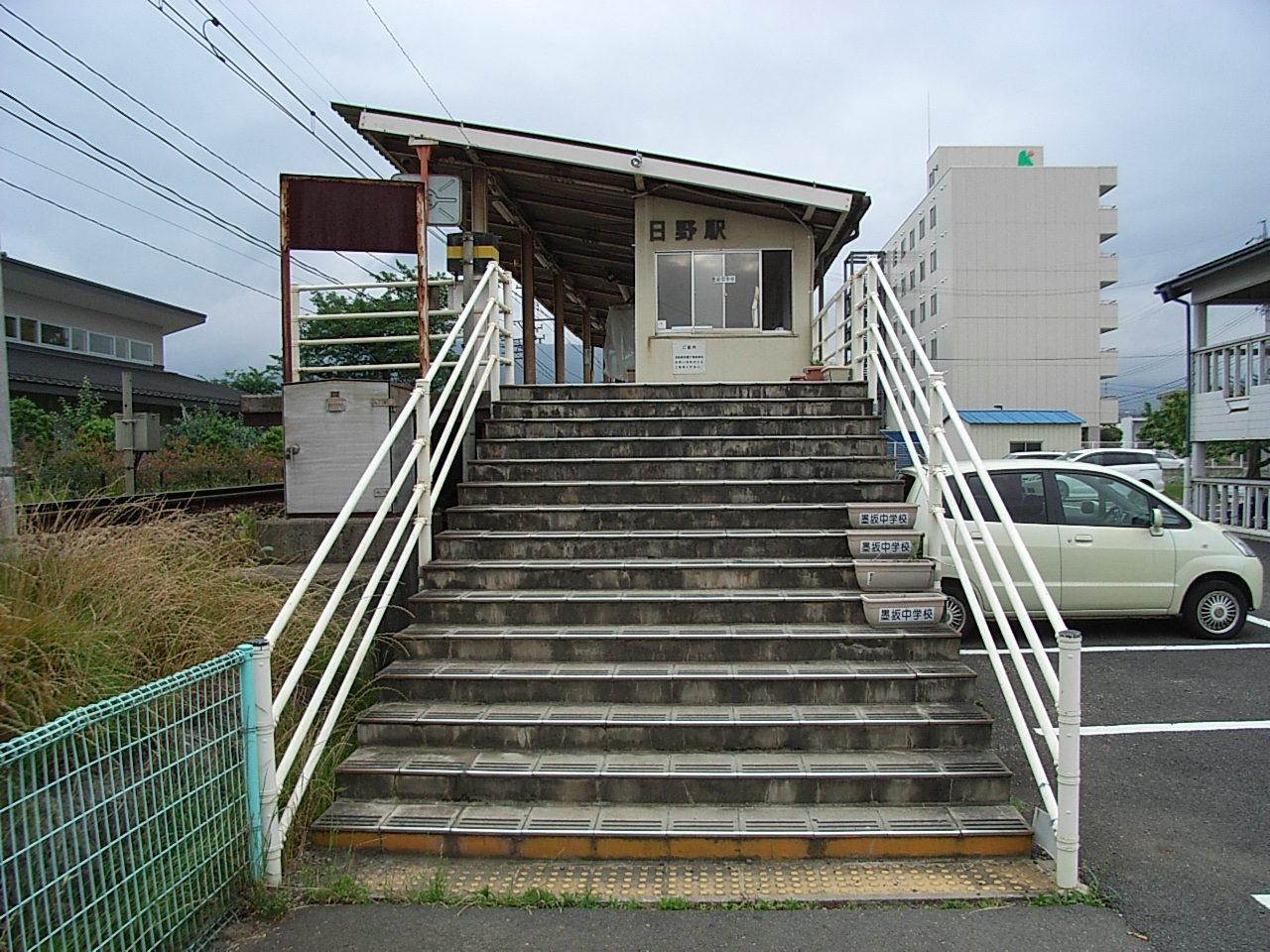
- Hino Station in June 2009

General information
- Location: 2517-15 Koyama, Suzaka-shi, Nagano-ken 382-0000; Japan
- Coordinates: 36°39′21.4″N 138°17′18.4″E
- Operator: Nagano Electric Railway
- Line: ■ Nagano Electric Railway Nagano Line
- Distance: 11.0 km from Nagano
- Platforms: 1 side platform
- Tracks: 1

Other information
- Status: Unstaffed
- Station code: N12
- Website: Official website

History
- Opened: 28 June 1926

Passengers
- FY2016: 209 daily
Location
- Location within Nagano Prefecture Location within Japan

Hino Station (日野駅, Hino-eki) is a railway station in the city of Suzaka, Nagano, Japan, operated by the private railway operating company Nagano Electric Railway.

== Lines ==
Hino Station is a station on the Nagano Electric Railway Nagano Line and is 11.0 kilometers from the terminus of the line at Nagano Station.

== Station layout ==
The station consists of one ground-level side platform serving one bi-directional track. The station is unattended.

== Adjacent stations ==
| « | Service | » |
Nagano Electric Railway
Express-A: Does not stop at this station
Express-B: Does not stop at this station
| Murayama | Local | Suzaka |

== History ==
The station opened on 28 June 1926. The station was closed on 11 January 1944, and re-opened on 8 October 1987.

== Passenger statistics ==
In fiscal 2016, the station was used by an average of 209 passengers daily (boarding passengers only).

== Surrounding area ==
- National Route 406

Hino Elementary School

== See also ==
- List of railway stations in Japan
