= Takayama, Nagano =

Village in Nagano Prefecture, Japan

Takayama 高山村
- Village
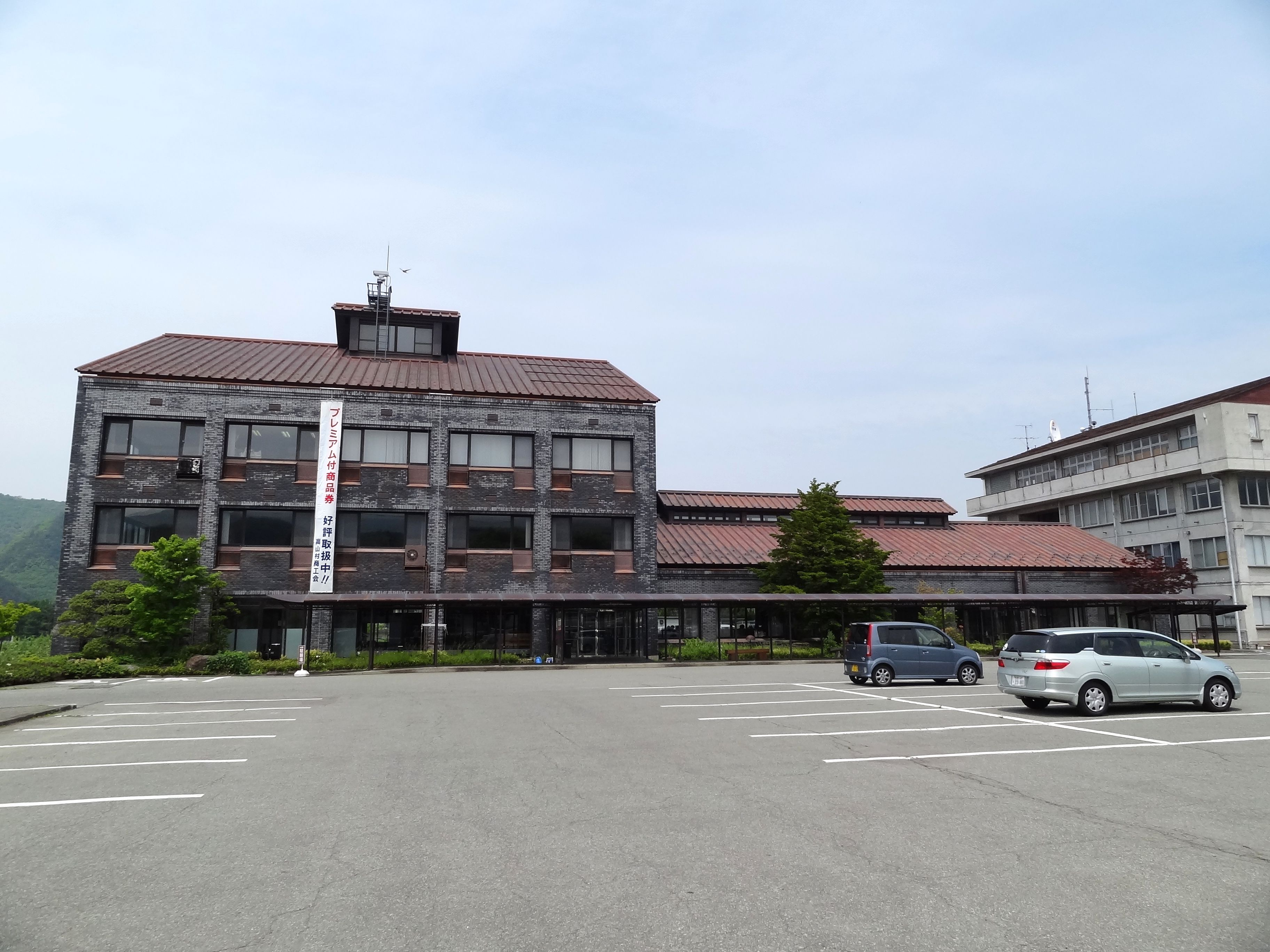
- Takayama Village Hall

- Flag Seal

- Location of Takayama in Nagano Prefecture

- Coordinates: 36°40′47.3″N 138°21′47.8″E
- Country: Japan
- Region: Chūbu (Kōshin'etsu)
- Prefecture: Nagano
- District: Kamitakai

Area
  - Total: 98.56 km^{2} (38.05 sq mi)

Population (March 2019)
  - Total: 7,101
  - Density: 72.05/km^{2} (186.6/sq mi)
- Time zone: UTC+9 (Japan Standard Time)
- Symbols
  - Tree: Taxus cuspidata
  - Flower: Rhododendron subg. Hymenanthes
- Phone number: 026-245-1100
- Address: 4972 Takai, Takayama-mura, Kamitakai-gun, Nagano-ken 382-8510
- Website: Official website

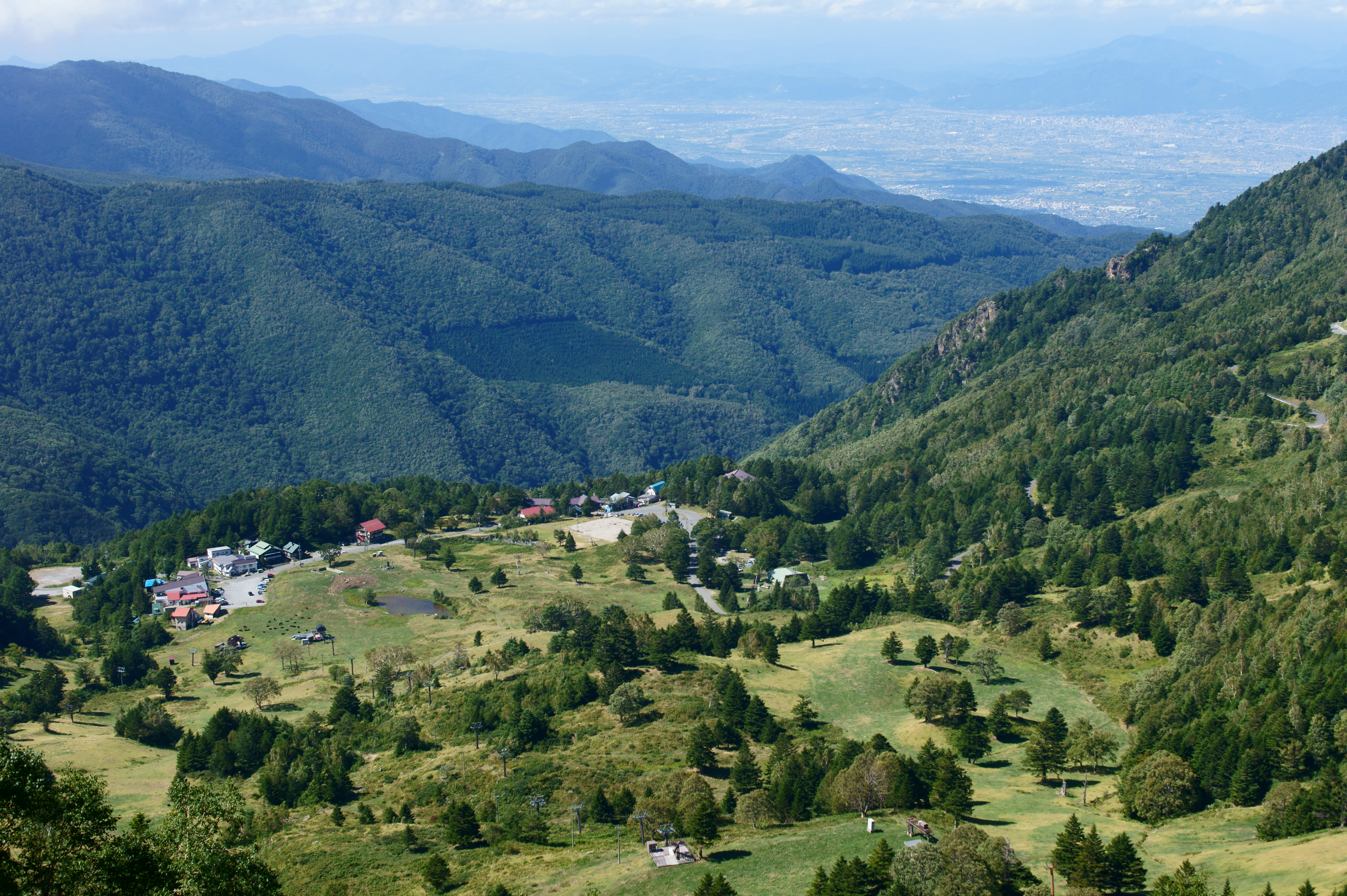
Yamada Ranch in Takayama

Takayama (高山村, Takayama-mura) is a village located in Nagano Prefecture, Japan. As of 1 March 2019, the village had an estimated population of 7,101 in 2466 households, and a population density of 72 persons per km^{2}. The total area of the village is 98.56 square kilometres (38.05 sq mi). Takayama is listed as one of The Most Beautiful Villages in Japan.

== Geography ==
Takayama is located in northeastern Nagano Prefecture, bordered by Gunma Prefecture to the east. The village is located in a mountainous area, and includes Mount Kitahotaka partly within its borders.

=== Surrounding municipalities ===
- Gunma Prefecture
  - Kusatsu
  - Nakanojō
  - Tsumagoi
- Nagano Prefecture
  - Nagano
  - Suzaka
  - Obuse
  - Yamanouchi

=== Climate ===
The village has a Humid continental climate characterized by warm and humid summers, and cold with heavy snowfall winters (Köppen climate classification Dfb). The average annual temperature in Takayama is 6.7 °C. The average annual rainfall is 1549 mm with September as the wettest month. The temperatures are highest on average in August, at around 24.9 °C, and lowest in January, at around -1.5 °C.

== Demographics ==
Per Japanese census data, the population of Takayama has remained fairly stable for much of the past century.

Historical population
Year	Pop.	±%
1940	6,127	—
1950	7,262	+18.5%
1960	6,694	−7.8%
1970	6,166	−7.9%
1980	6,931	+12.4%
1990	7,342	+5.9%
2000	7,776	+5.9%
2010	7,565	−2.7%
2020	6,617	−12.5%

== History ==
The area of present-day Takayama was part of ancient Shinano Province. Numerous ruins from the Jōmon period, Kofun period and Nara and Heian periods have been found, indicating continuous settlement for thousands of years. During the Edo period, much of the area was an exclave of Hamada Domain from Iwami Province or tenryō territory under the direct control of the Tokugawa shogunate. The villages of Takai and Yamada were established on April 1, 1889 by the establishment of the modern municipalities system. The two villages merged on September 30, 1956 to form the village of Takayama.

== Economy ==
The economy of Takayama is based on agriculture, forestry, and seasonal tourism.

== Education ==
Takayama has one public elementary school and one public middle school operated by the village government. The village does not have a high school.

== Transportation ==
=== Railway ===
- The village has no passenger railway service.

=== Highway ===
- The village is not located on any national highway.
