= Murayama Station (Nagano) =

Railway station in Suzaka, Nagano Prefecture, Japan

Murayama Station 村山駅
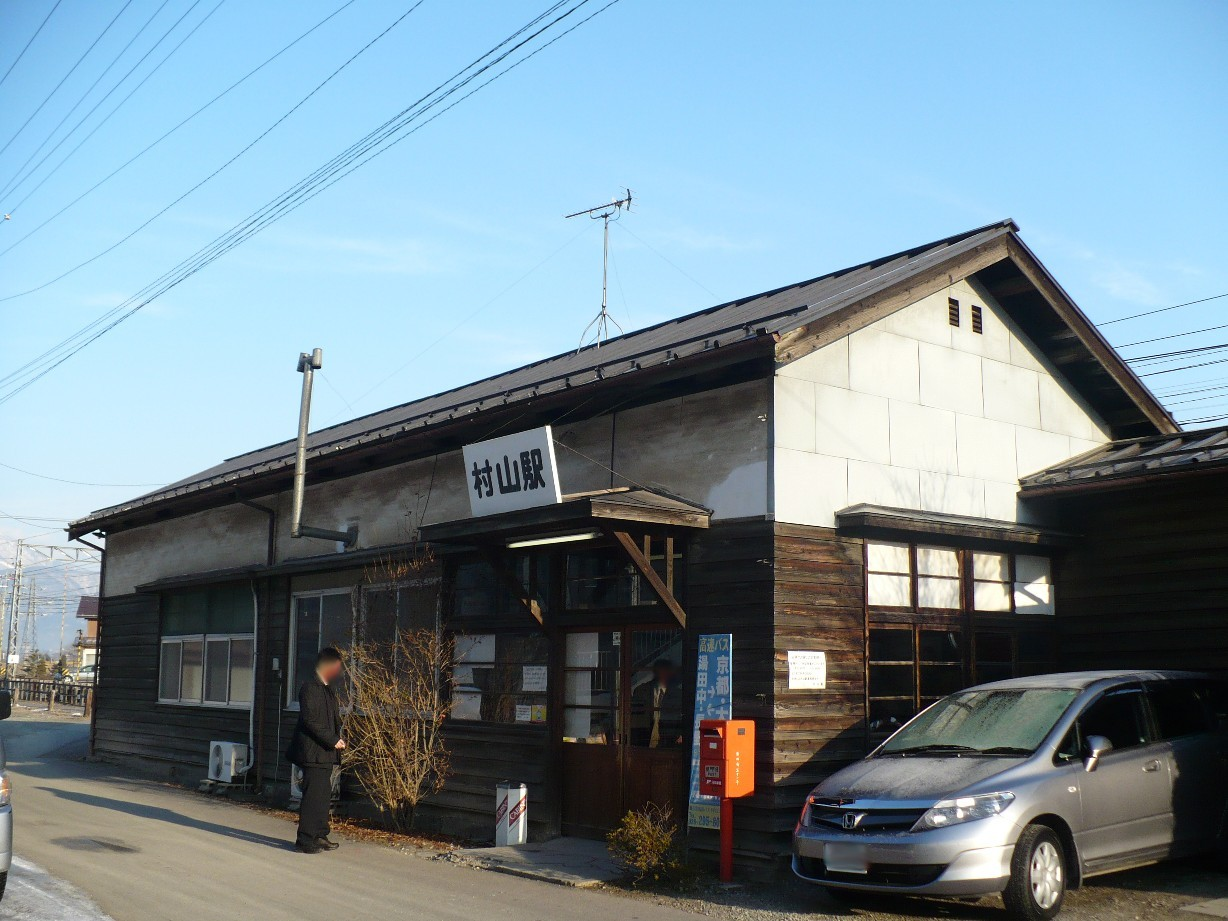
- Murayama Station in February 2008

General information
- Location: 303-2 Takanashi, Suzaka-shi, Nagano-ken 382-0000; Japan
- Coordinates: 36°39′33.4″N 138°16′46.5″E
- Operator: Nagano Electric Railway
- Line: ■ Nagano Electric Railway Nagano Line
- Distance: 10.0 km from Nagano
- Platforms: 1 side platform
- Tracks: 1

Other information
- Status: Unstaffed
- Station code: N11
- Website: Official website

History
- Opened: 28 June 1926

Passengers
- FY2016: 388 daily
Location
- Location within Nagano Prefecture Location within Japan

Murayama Station (村山駅, Murayama-eki) is a railway station in the city of Suzaka, Nagano, Japan, operated by the private railway operating company Nagano Electric Railway.

== Lines ==
Murayama Station is a station on the Nagano Electric Railway Nagano Line and is 10.0 kilometers from the terminus of the line at Nagano Station.

== Station layout ==
The station consists of one ground-level side platform serving one bi-directional track, connected to the station building by a level crossing. The station is unattended.

== Adjacent stations ==
«	Service	»
Nagano Electric Railway
Express-A: Does not stop at this station
Express-B: Does not stop at this station
Yanagihara	Local	Hino

== History ==
The station opened on 28 June 1926.

== Passenger statistics ==
In fiscal 2016, the station was used by an average of 388 passengers daily (boarding passengers only).

== Surrounding area ==
- National Route 406
- Chikuma River

== See also ==
- List of railway stations in Japan
