= Suzaka, Nagano =

Suzaka 須坂市
- City
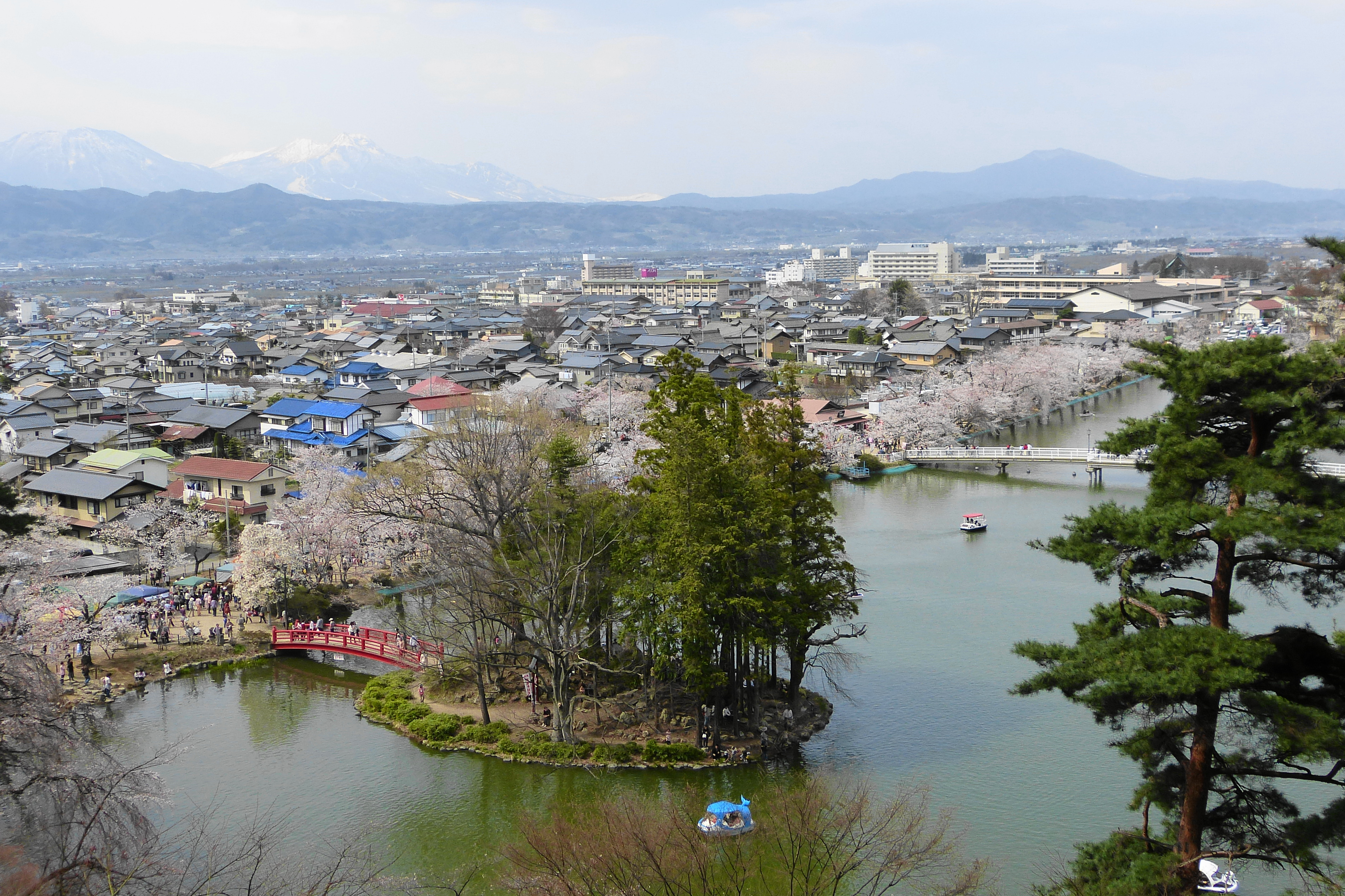
- View of downtown Susaka and Garyu Park

- Flag Seal

- Location of Suzaka in Nagano Prefecture

- Coordinates: 36°39′4″N 138°18′26.1″E
- Country: Japan
- Region: Chūbu (Kōshin'etsu)
- Prefecture: Nagano

Government
  - Mayor: Masao Miki (since January 2004)

Area
  - Total: 149.67 km^{2} (57.79 sq mi)

Population (March 2019)
  - Total: 50,828
  - Density: 339.60/km^{2} (879.56/sq mi)
- Time zone: UTC+9 (Japan Standard Time)
- Symbols
  - Tree: Cryptomeria japonica
  - Flower: Rhododendron molle
- Phone number: 0268-62-1111
- Address: Suzaka 1528-1, Suzaka-shi, Nagano-ken 382-8511
- Website: Official website

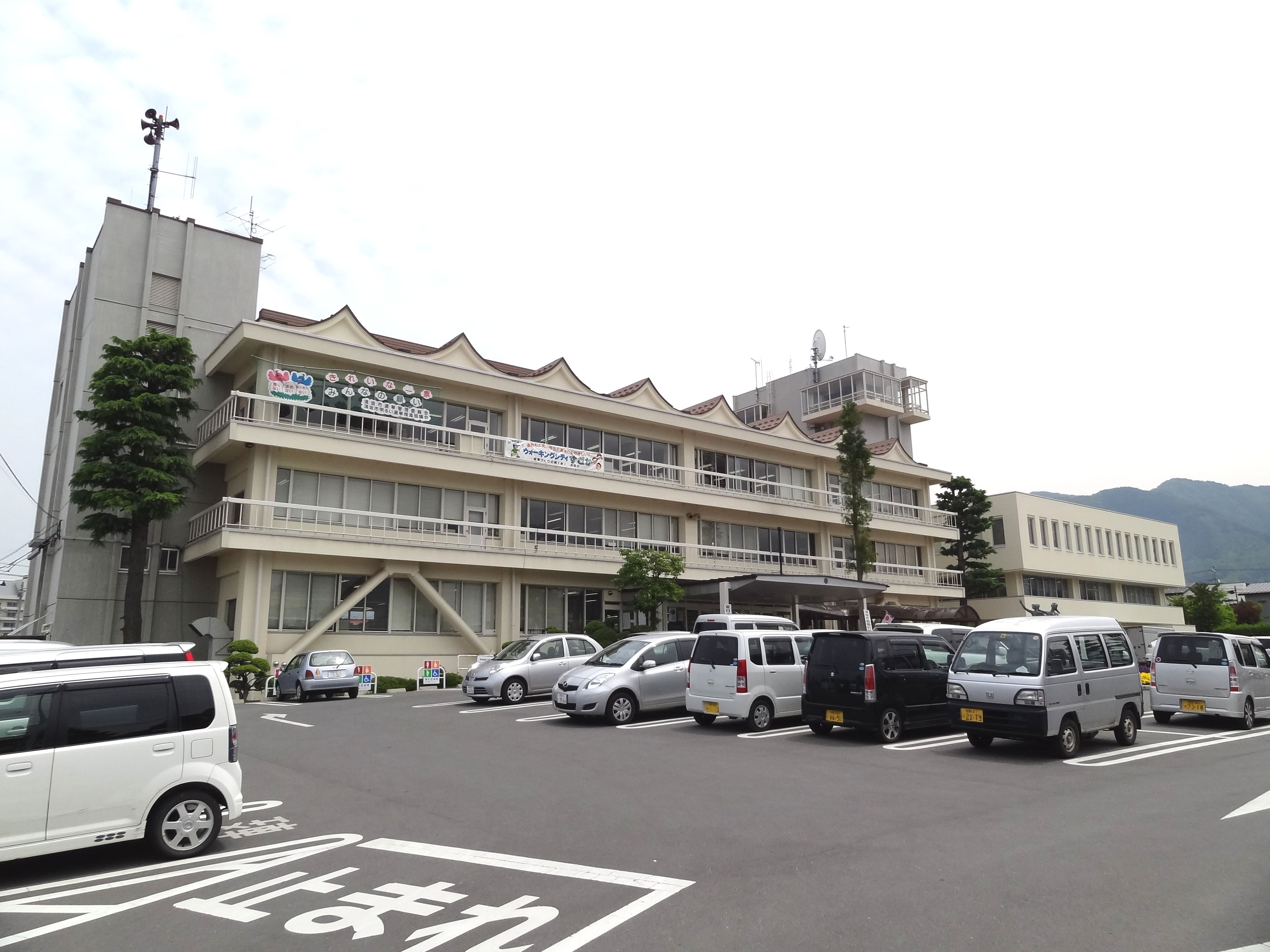
Suzaka city hall

Suzaka (須坂市, Suzaka-shi) is a city located in Nagano Prefecture, Japan. As of 1 March 2019, the city had an estimated population of 50,828 in 19,979 households, and a population density of 334 persons per km^{2}. The total area of the city is 149.6 square kilometres (57.8 sq mi).

== Geography ==
Suzaka is located in northern Nagano Prefecture on the alluvial fan where the Matsukawa River joins the Chikuma River.

=== Surrounding municipalities ===
- Gunma Prefecture
  - Tsumagoi
- Nagano Prefecture
  - Nagano
  - Obuse
  - Takayama
  - Ueda

=== Climate ===
The city has a climate characterized by characterized by hot and humid summers, and relatively mild winters (Köppen climate classification Cfa). The average annual temperature in Suzaka is 10.5 °C. The average annual rainfall is 1189 mm with September as the wettest month. The temperatures are highest on average in August, at around 23.8 °C, and lowest in January, at around -2.2 °C.

== Demographics ==
Per Japanese census data, the population of Suzaka has remained relatively stable over the past 40 years.

Historical population
Year	Pop.	±%
1940	34,517	—
1950	43,407	+25.8%
1960	43,779	+0.9%
1970	45,782	+4.6%
1980	52,543	+14.8%
1990	53,662	+2.1%
2000	54,207	+1.0%
2010	52,168	−3.8%
2020	49,559	−5.0%

== History ==
Suzaka is located in former Shinano Province and was a castle town for Suzaka Domain under the Edo period Tokugawa shogunate. In the post-Meiji restoration cadastral reform of April 1, 1889, the modern town of Suzaka was established. Suzuka annexed the village of Hitaki on December 1, 1936 and the villages of Hino and Toyosu on February 11, 1954. Suzaka was elevated to city status on April 1, 1954. On January 1, 1955, Suzaka annexed the neighbouring villages of Inoue and Takahe, followed by the village of Azuma on April 30, 1971.

== Government ==
Suzaka has a mayor-council form of government with a directly elected mayor and a unicameral city legislature of 20 members.

== Economy ==
The city was noted in the Meiji period for its silk industry. After World War II, an electronics industry was established. Fujitsu Corporation has a plant in Suzaka. The city is also noted for apples and grapes, and the Prefectural Agricultural Research Station is located in Suzaka.

== Education ==
Suzaka has eleven public elementary schools and four public middle schools operated by the city government, and three public high schools operated by the Nagano Prefectural Board of Education.

== Transportation ==
=== Railway ===
- Nagano Electric Railway
  - Murayama - Hino - Suzaka - Kitasuzaka

=== Highway ===
- Jōshin-etsu Expressway
- National Route 403
- National Route 406

== International relations ==
- - Siping, Jilin, China, friendship city since May 12, 1994

== Local attractions ==
- Garyu Park, one of Japan's Top 100 Sakura Spots
- Suzaka Municipal Zoo
- Yonako Falls, one of Japan's Top 100 Waterfalls
