= Kamitakai District, Nagano =

District in Nagano prefecture, Japan

Coordinates: 36.666°N 138.412°E

Kamitakai (上高井郡, Kamitakai-gun) is a district located in Nagano Prefecture, Japan.

As of 2003, the district has an estimated population of 19,073 with a density of 162.23 persons per km^{2}. The total area is 117.57 km^{2}.

== Municipalities ==
The district consists of one town and one village:

- Obuse (Note: Classified as a town.)
- Takayama (Note: Classified as a village.)

== History ==
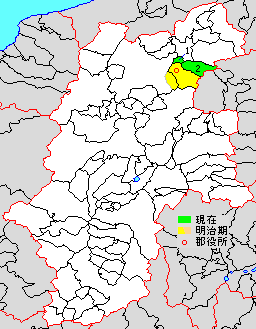
Map showing original extent of Kamitakai District in Nagano Prefecture: * yellow - areas formerly within the district borders during the early Meiji period: 1. Obuse-machi; 2. Takayama-mura

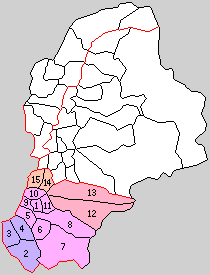
Colored areas are in this district.
