= Mount Azumaya =

Stratovolcano on the island of Honshu, Japan

- 四阿山
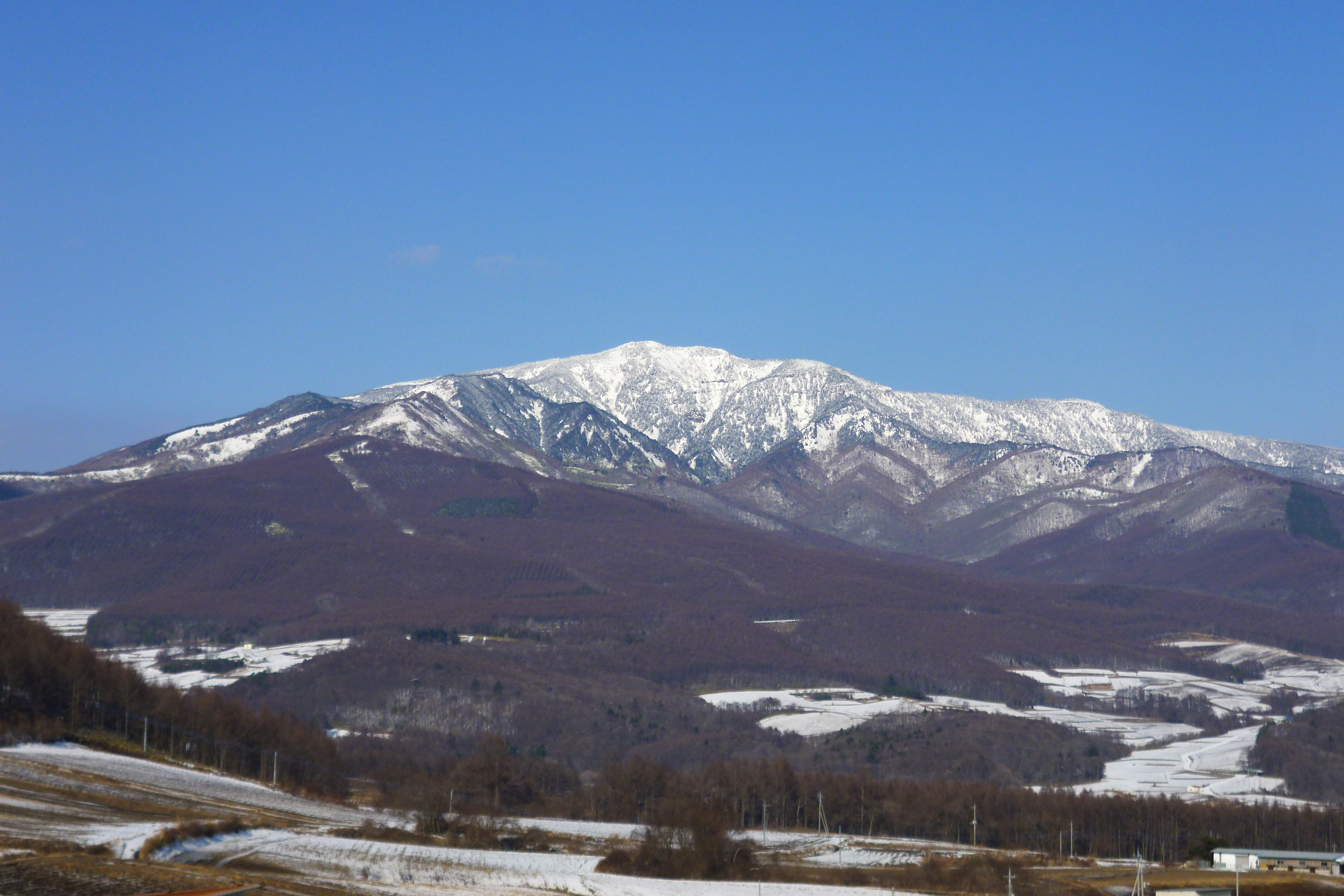

Highest point
- Elevation: 2,354 m (7,723 ft)
- Listing: 100 Famous Japanese Mountains
- Coordinates: 36°32′30″N 138°24′47″E

Naming
- English translation: arbour mountain
- Language of name: Japanese
- Pronunciation: [azumajasaɴ]

Geography
- Location within Japan
- Location: Chubu region and Kantō region, Honshū, Japan

Geology
- Mountain type: Stratovolcano

Climbing
- Easiest route: Hike

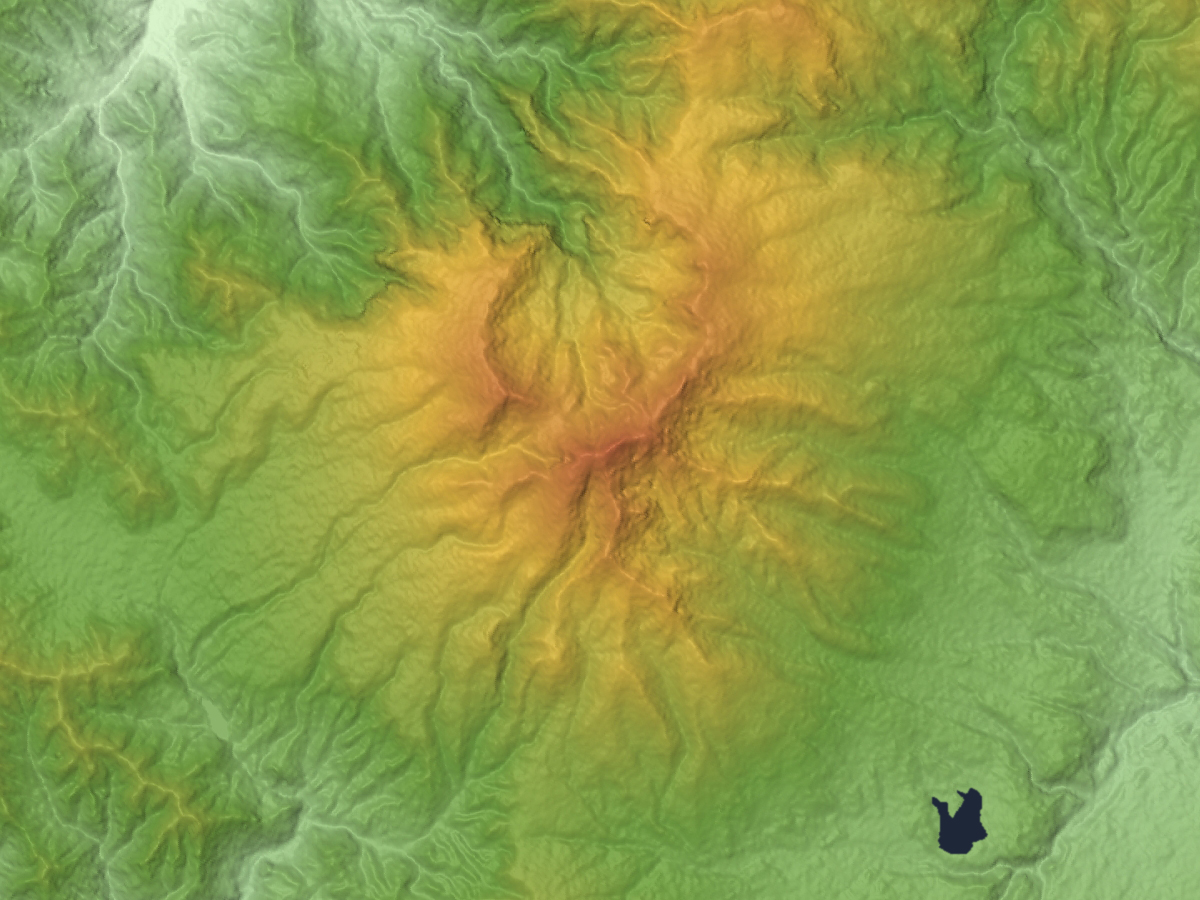
Relief Map

Mount Azumaya (四阿山, Azumaya-san) is a stratovolcano in Japan. The 2,354-metre-high (7,723 ft) peak lies on the border of Nagano Prefecture and Gunma Prefecture. There exist alternative spellings of the mountain's name, like: 吾妻山 and 吾嬬山 which is read as "Agatsuma-yama" (Mount Agatsuma). In the village Tsumagoi, the mountain is spelled 吾妻山.

The mountain should not be confused with Mount Azumaya (四阿屋山, Azumaya-san) of which there are two, one in Nagano Prefecture and the other in Saitama Prefecture. Though the reading is the same, the name written in Kanji differs from the mountain in this article.

== Outline ==
Mount Azumaya was formed between 900,000 and 300,000 years ago by andesite lava flowing out of a stratovolcano. An eruption 340,000 years ago formed a caldera of circa 3 kilometers in diameter. Through erosion the mountain has arrived at its present form with several peaks. Azumaya Volcano (四阿火山, Azumaya-kazan) is the general term for the following peaks lying roughly on a circle: Mount Neko (根子岳, Neko-dake), Mount Azumaya, Mount Urakura (浦倉山, Urakura-yama), Mount Kimyō (奇妙山, Kimyō-san).

The famous Sugadaira Kōgen ski area is found on the mountain's southwest (Nagano-) side. Also on the Gunma-side there exists a ski area. In addition, north of the mountain lies Yonakodaibakufu (米子大瀑布) which is one of Japan's Top 100 Waterfalls.

== Main ascent routes ==
The mountain is well connected with several hiking trails:

- Sugadai-bokujō (菅平牧場) - Mount Neko (根子岳, Neko-dake) - Mount Azumaya
- Azumaya Kōgen (四阿高原) - Mount Azumaya
- Torii Ridge (鳥居峠, toriitōge) - Mount Azumaya
- Palcall Tsumagoi (パルコール嬬恋) - Mount Azumaya

The gondola (Gondola Palcabin (ゴンドラパルキャビン)) from Palcall Tsumagoi is also operating during the summer season and can be used to climb the mountain

== Mountain in the vicinity ==
- Mount Neko (根子岳, Neko-dake) (2,207m)

== Gallery ==
Mount Azumaya
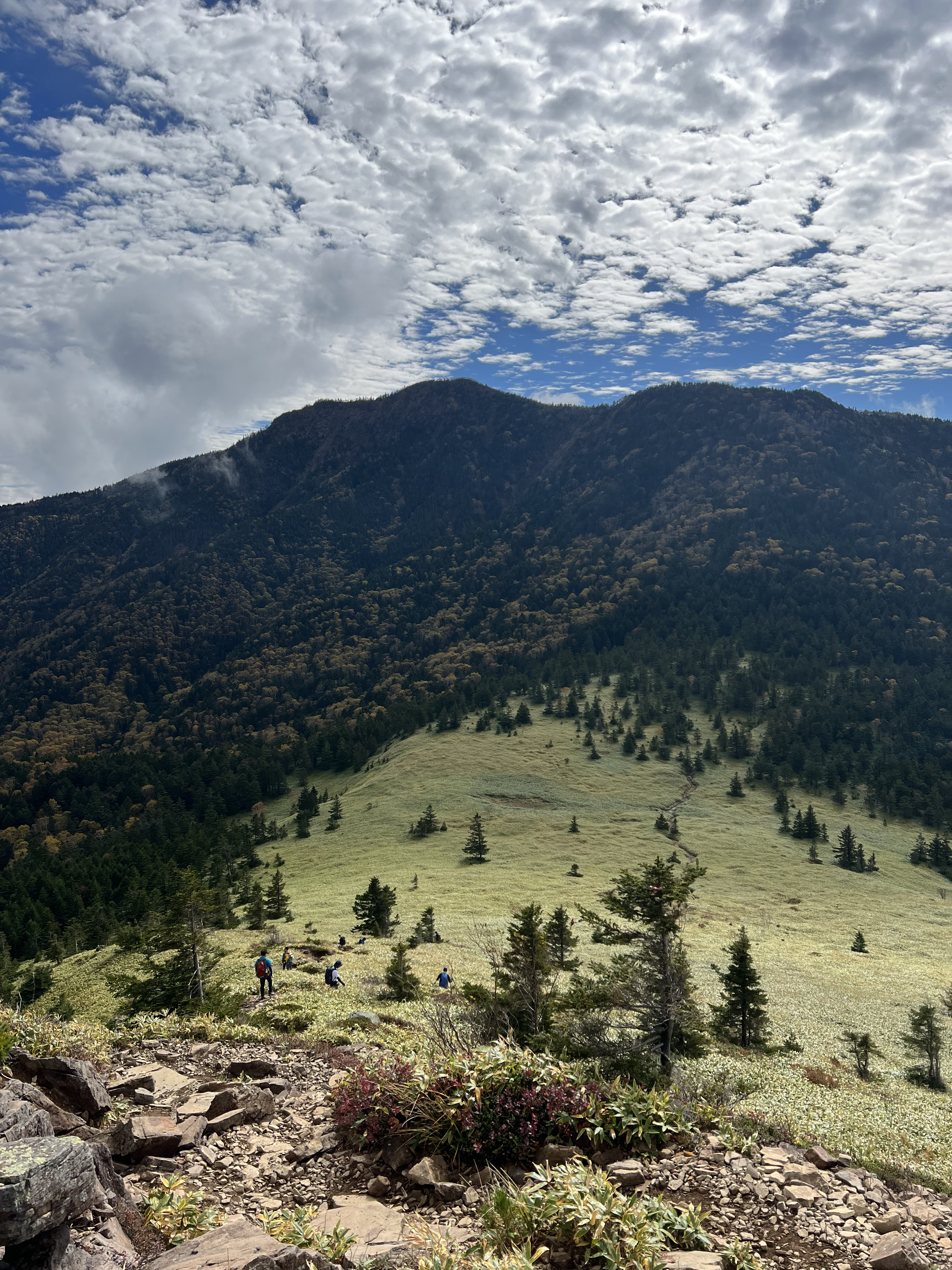
Mount Azumaya from Mount Neko, autumn

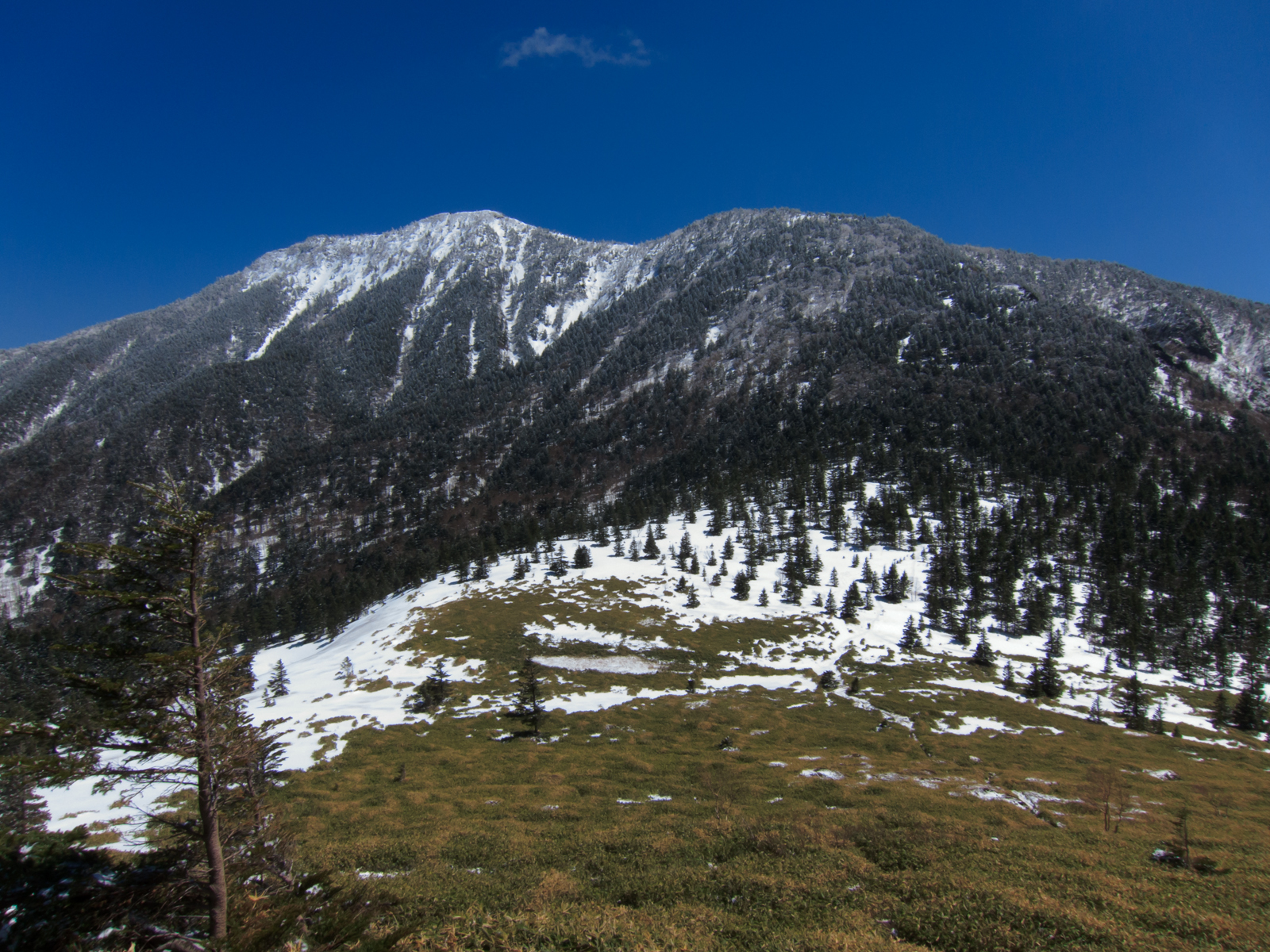
Mount Azumaya from Mount Neko, spring

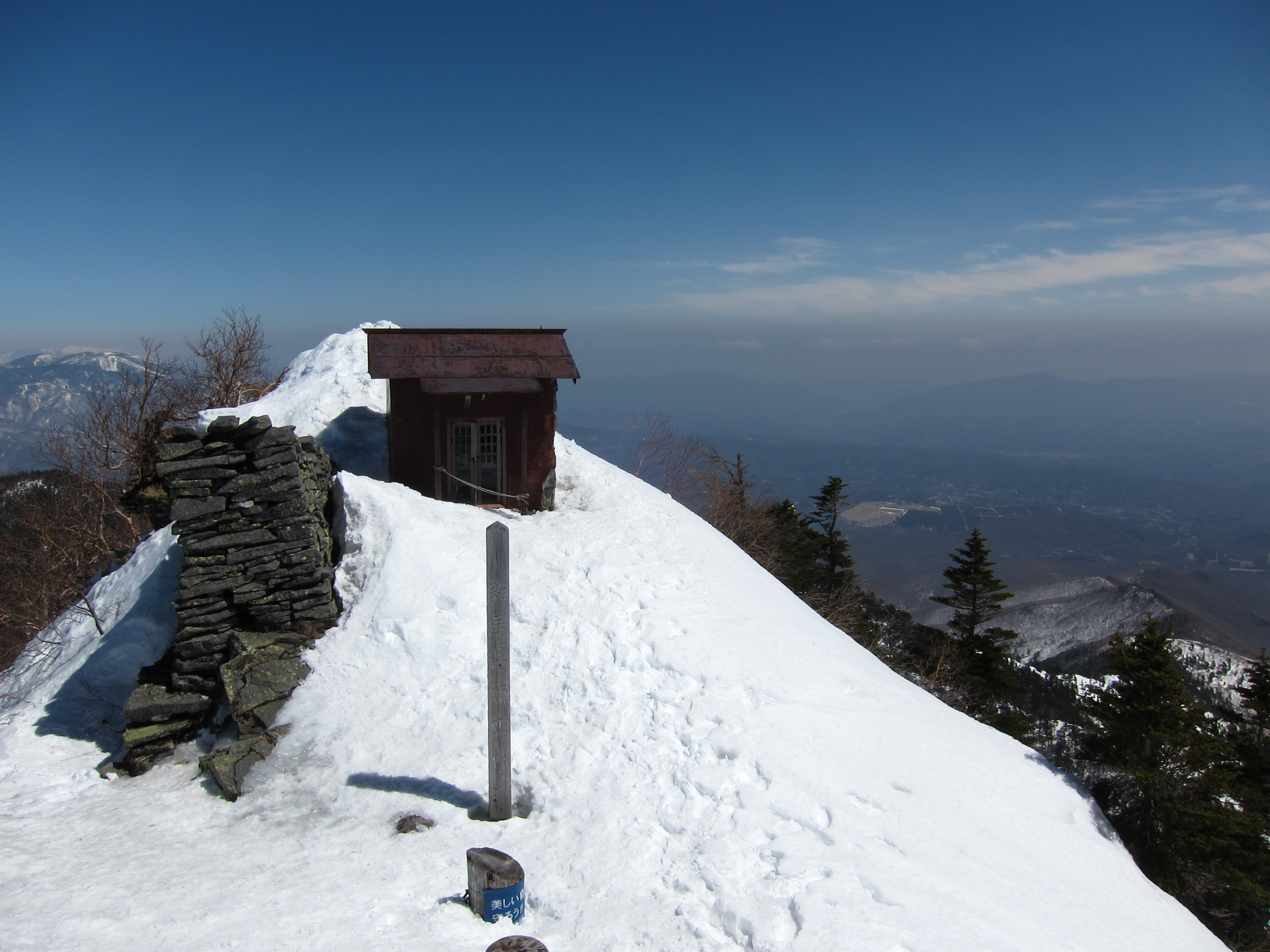
Summit of Mount Azumaya, late winter

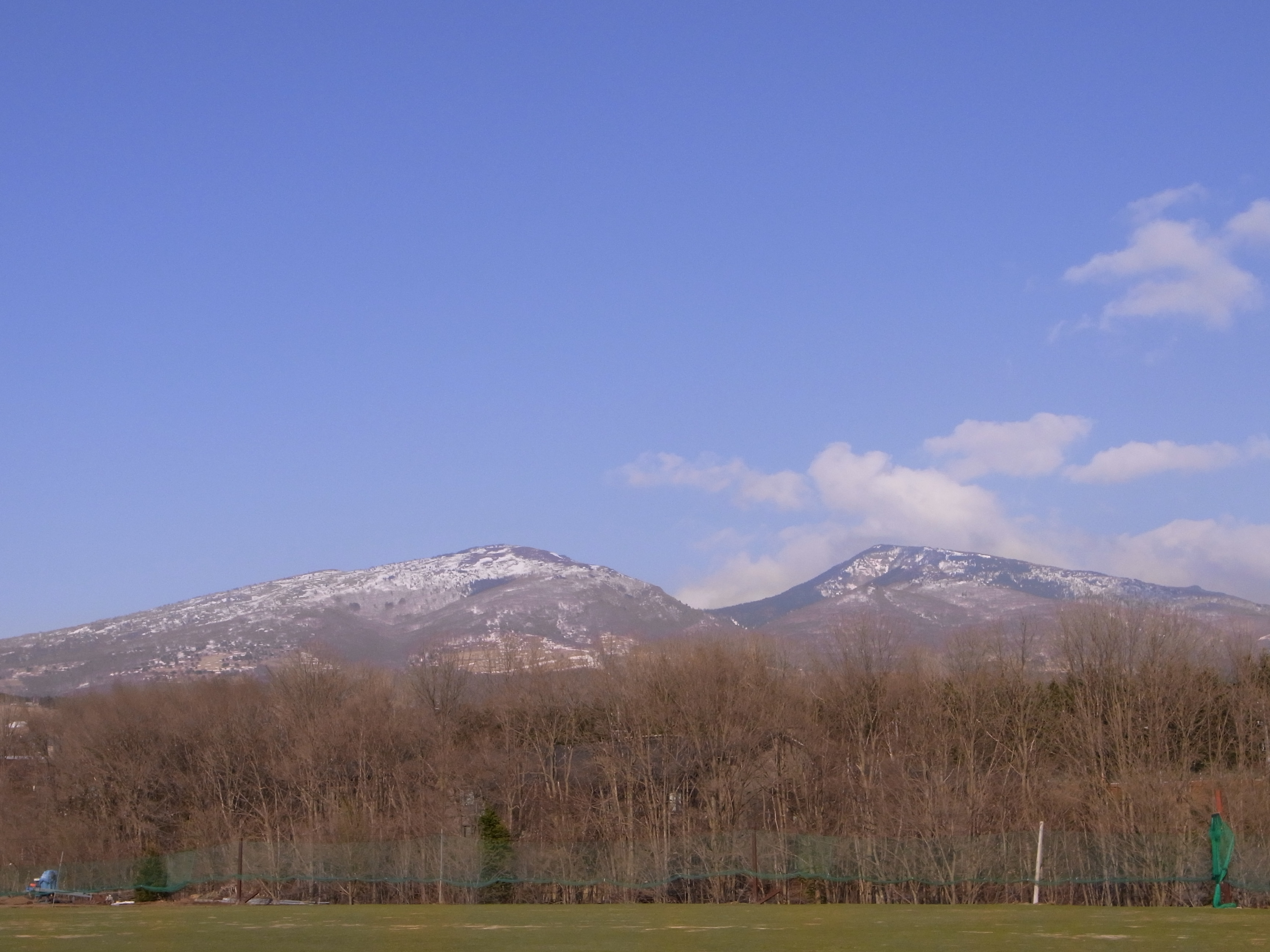
Mount Neko (left) and Mount Azumaya, spring

== See also ==
- List of volcanoes in Japan
- List of mountains in Japan
