= Japan National Route 406 =

National highway in Japan

National Route 406
- 国道406号
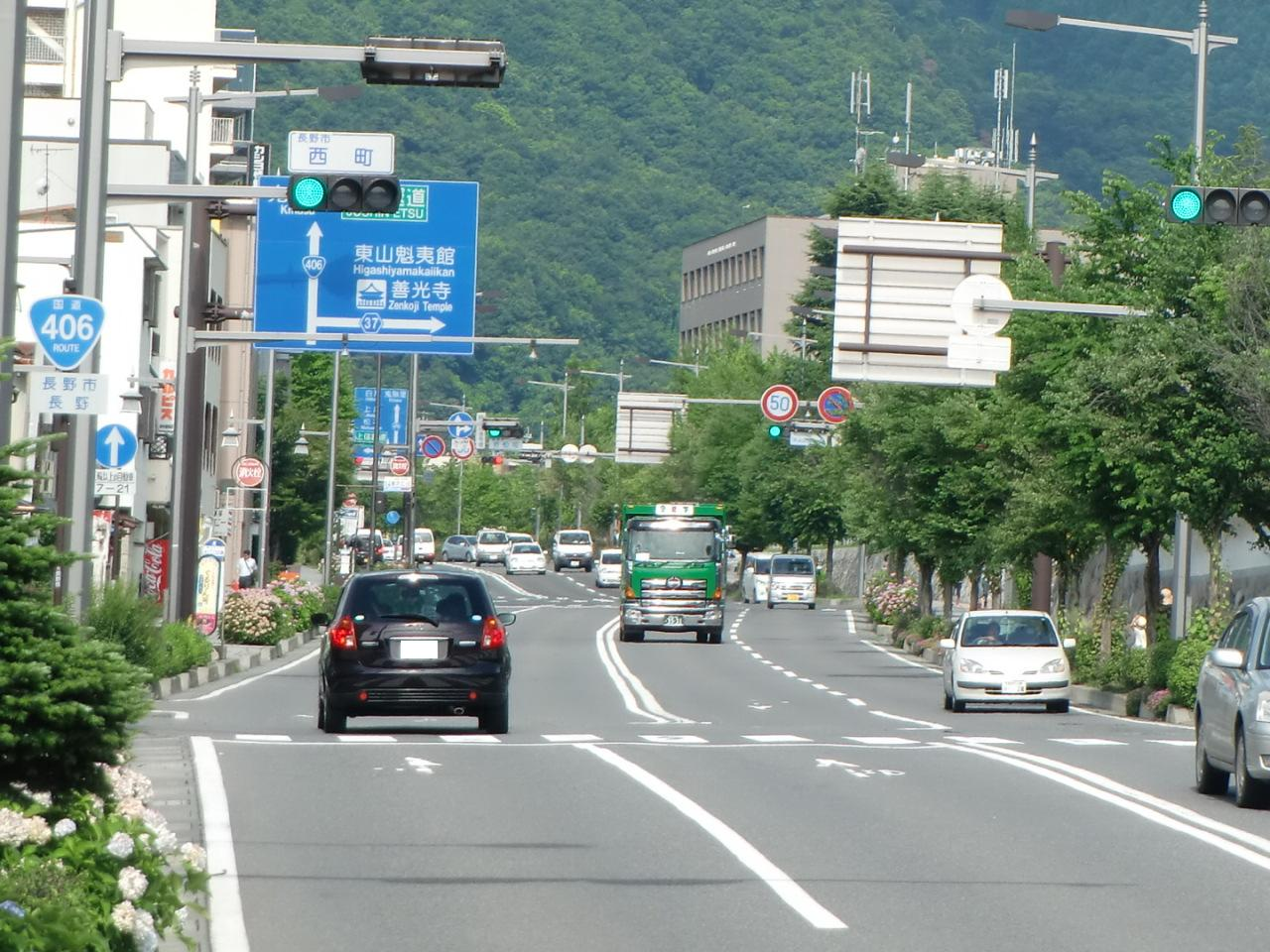

Route information
- Length: 192.5 km (119.6 mi)

Location
- Country: Japan

Highway system
- National highways of Japan; Expressways of Japan
← National Route 405	→ National Route 407

National Route 406 is a national highway of Japan connecting Ōmachi, Nagano and Takasaki, Gunma in Japan, with a total length of 192.5 km (119.61 mi).
