= Russia at the 1998 Winter Olympics =

- IOC code: RUS
- NOC: Russian Olympic Committee
- Website: www.roc.ru (in Russian)

in Nagano
- Competitors: 122 (79 men, 43 women) in 12 sports
- Flag bearer: Alexey Prokurorov
- Medals Ranked 3rd: Gold 9 Silver 6 Bronze 3 Total 18

Winter Olympics appearances (overview)
- 1994; 1998; 2002; 2006; 2010; 2014; 2018–2026

Other related appearances
- Soviet Union (1956–1988); Unified Team (1992); Olympic Athletes from Russia (2018); ROC (2022); Individual Neutral Athletes (2026)

Russia competed at the 1998 Winter Olympics in Nagano, Japan.

== Medalists ==
Medal	Name	Sport	Event
Gold	Galina Koukleva	Biathlon	Women's 7.5 km sprint
Gold	Yuliya Chepalova	Cross-country skiing	Women's 30 km freestyle
Gold	Olga Danilova	Cross-country skiing	Women's 15 km classical
Gold	Larisa Lazutina	Cross-country skiing	Women's 5 km classical
Gold	Larisa Lazutina	Cross-country skiing	Women's 10 km freestyle pursuit
Gold	Olga Danilova, Nina Gavrilyuk; Larisa Lazutina, Yelena Välbe	Cross-country skiing	Women's 4 x 5 km relay
Gold	Ilia Kulik	Figure skating	Men's
Gold	Oksana Kazakova, Artur Dmitriev	Figure skating	Pairs
Gold	Oksana Grishuk, Evgeny Platov	Figure skating	Ice dance
Silver	Albina Akhatova, Galina Koukleva; Olga Melnik, Olga Romasko	Biathlon	Women's 4 x 7.5 km relay
Silver	Olga Danilova	Cross-country skiing	Women's 10 km freestyle pursuit
Silver	Larisa Lazutina	Cross-country skiing	Women's 15 km classical
Silver	Elena Berezhnaya, Anton Sikharulidze	Figure skating	Pairs
Silver	Anjelika Krylova, Oleg Ovsyannikov	Figure skating	Ice dance
Silver	Pavel Bure, Valeri Bure; Sergei Gonchar, Alexei Gusarov; Valeri Kamensky, Darius Kasparaitis; Igor Kravchuk, Sergei Krivokrasov; Boris Mironov, Dmitri Mironov; Aleksey Morozov, Sergei Nemchinov; Oleg Shevtsov, Mikhail Shtalenkov; German Titov, Andrei Trefilov; Alexei Yashin, Dmitri Yushkevich; Valeri Zelepukin, Alexei Zhamnov; Alexei Zhitnik	Ice hockey	Men's team
Bronze	Vladimir Drachev, Viktor Maigourov; Pavel Muslimov, Sergei Tarasov	Biathlon	Men's 4 x 7.5 km relay
Bronze	Larisa Lazutina	Cross-country skiing	Women's 30 km freestyle
Bronze	Valeri Stolyarov	Nordic combined	Men's individual 15 km

== Competitors ==
The following is the list of number of competitors in the Games.

Sport	Men	Women	Total
Alpine skiing	2	5	7
Biathlon	6	5	11
Bobsleigh	6	–	6
Cross-country skiing	8	6	14
Figure skating	8	9	17
Freestyle skiing	4	5	9
Ice hockey	22	0	22
Luge	5	2	7
Nordic combined	5	–	5
Short track speed skating	0	2	2
Ski jumping	4	–	4
Speed skating	9	9	18
Total	79	43	122

== Alpine skiing ==
Men

Athlete	Event	Final				
Athlete	Event	Run 1	Run 2	Run 3	Total	Rank
Vasily Bezsmelnitsyn	Downhill				1:54.27	24
Vasily Bezsmelnitsyn	Super-G				1:39.39	29
Vasily Bezsmelnitsyn	Giant slalom				did not finish	
Andrey Filichkin	Downhill				1:52.65	18
Andrey Filichkin	Super-G				1:37.29	21
Andrey Filichkin	Giant slalom				did not finish	

Women

Athlete	Event	Final				
Athlete	Event	Run 1	Run 2	Run 3	Total	Rank
Olesya Aliyeva	Super-G				1:22.00	37
Svetlana Gladisheva	Downhill				1:29.50	5
Svetlana Gladisheva	Super-G				1:18.82	13
Anna Larionova	Downhill				1:34.36	32
Anna Larionova	Super-G				1:20.61	33
Yekaterina Nesterenko	Downhill				1:32.54	29
Varvara Zelenskaya	Downhill				1:30.38	13
Varvara Zelenskaya	Super-G				1:18.72	12

== Biathlon ==
Men

Athlete	Event	Final		
Athlete	Event	Time	Misses	Rank
Vladimir Drachev	10 km sprint	28:46.4	1	12
Vladimir Drachev	20 km individual	1:01:13.9	6	35
Aleksei Kobelev	10 km sprint	31:02.8	4	56
Viktor Maigourov	10 km sprint	28:36.0	0	4
Pavel Muslimov	20 km individual	59:26.5	3	17
Sergei Tarasov	10 km sprint	29:23.2	3	22
Sergei Tarasov	20 km individual	59:24.3	4	15
Pavel Vavilov	20 km individual	1:03:59.4	7	53
Pavel Muslimov; Vladimir Drachev; Sergei Tarasov; Viktor Maigourov	4 x 7.5 km relay	1:22:19.3	0+7	3rd place, bronze medalist(s)

Women

Athlete	Event	Final		
Athlete	Event	Time	Misses	Rank
Albina Akhatova	7.5 km sprint	24:06.4	2	13
Albina Akhatova	15 km individual	56:21.7	1	7
Galina Koukleva	7.5 km sprint	23:08.0	1	1st place, gold medalist(s)
Galina Koukleva	15 km individual	1:00:29.2	6	31
Olga Melnik	15 km individual	57:10.8	2	13
Olga Romasko	7.5 km sprint	25:03.6	3	27
Olga Romasko	15 km individual	1:00:58.8	3	33
Anna Volkova	7.5 km sprint	25:42.7	4	44
Olga Melnik; Galina Koukleva; Albina Akhatova; Olga Romasko	4 x 7.5 km relay	1:40:25.2	0+9	2nd place, silver medalist(s)

== Bobsleigh ==
Athlete	Event	Final					
Athlete	Event	Run 1	Run 2	Run 3	Run 4	Total	Rank
Pavel Shcheglovsky; Konstantin Dyomin	Two-man	55.41	55.09	54.84	54.97	3:40.31	16
Yevgeni Popov; Oleg Petrov	Two-man	55.53	55.37	55.25	55.31	3:41.46	21
Pavel Shcheglovsky; Alexei Seliverstov; Vladislav Posedkin; Konstantin Dyomin	Four-man	53.72	53.95	54.71		2:42.38	19

== Cross-country skiing ==
Men

Athlete	Event	Final	
Athlete	Event	Total	Rank
Aleksandr Kravchenko	30 km classical	1:41:22.3	31
Sergey Kriyanin	10 km classical	30:03.2	42
Sergey Kriyanin	15 km freestyle pursuit	1:10:33.4	25
Vladimir Legotin	10 km classical	31:10.3	62
Vladimir Legotin	15 km freestyle pursuit	1:12:19.5	39
Vladimir Legotin	30 km classical	1:38:23.7	9
Grigory Menshenin	50 km freestyle	did not finish	
Andrei Nutrikhin	50 km freestyle	2:12:21.9	15
Maksim Pichugin	30 km classical	1:42:41.7	39
Maksim Pichugin	50 km freestyle	2:18:19.1	37
Alexey Prokurorov	10 km classical	29:27.3	31
Alexey Prokurorov	15 km freestyle pursuit	1:09:48.1	18
Alexey Prokurorov	50 km freestyle	2:06:41.5	4
Sergei Tchepikov	10 km classical	28:55.9	22
Sergei Tchepikov	15 km freestyle pursuit	1:08:24.3	9
Sergei Tchepikov	30 km classical	1:41:59.9	32
Vladimir Legotin; Alexey Prokurorov; Sergey Kriyanin; Sergei Tchepikov	4 x 10 km relay	1:42:39.5	5

Women

Athlete	Event	Final	
Athlete	Event	Total	Rank
Yuliya Chepalova	5 km classical	18:20.0	13
Yuliya Chepalova	10 km freestyle pursuit	46:28.4	6
Yuliya Chepalova	30 km freestyle	1:22:01.5	1st place, gold medalist(s)
Olga Danilova	5 km classical	17:51.3	5
Olga Danilova	10 km freestyle pursuit	46:13.4	2nd place, silver medalist(s)
Olga Danilova	15 km classical	46:55.4	1st place, gold medalist(s)
Olga Danilova	30 km freestyle	1:28:08.1	13
Nina Gavrilyuk	5 km classical	17:50.3	4
Nina Gavrilyuk	10 km freestyle pursuit	46:49.3	7
Larisa Lazutina	5 km classical	17:37.9	1st place, gold medalist(s)
Larisa Lazutina	10 km freestyle pursuit	46:06.9	1st place, gold medalist(s)
Larisa Lazutina	15 km classical	47:01.0	2nd place, silver medalist(s)
Larisa Lazutina	30 km freestyle	1:23:15.7	3rd place, bronze medalist(s)
Svetlana Nageykina	15 km classical	49:22.5	16
Yelena Välbe	15 km classical	49:25.9	17
Yelena Välbe	30 km freestyle	1:24:52.8	5
Nina Gavrilyuk; Olga Danilova; Yelena Välbe; Larisa Lazutina	4 x 5 km relay	55:13.5	1st place, gold medalist(s)

== Figure skating ==
Athlete	Event	CD1	CD2	SP/OD	FS/FD	Points	Rank
Ilia Kulik	Men's			1	1	1.5	1st place, gold medalist(s)
Alexei Yagudin	Men's			4	5	7.0	5
Maria Butyrskaya	Ladies'			3	4	5.5	4
Irina Slutskaya	Ladies'			5	5	7.5	5
Elena Sokolova	Ladies'			10	7	12.0	7
Elena Berezhnaya; Anton Sikharulidze	Pairs			3	2	3.5	2nd place, silver medalist(s)
Marina Eltsova; Andrei Bushkov	Pairs			5	7	9.5	7
Oksana Kazakova; Artur Dmitriev	Pairs			1	1	1.5	1st place, gold medalist(s)
Oksana Grishuk; Evgeny Platov	Ice dance	1	1	1	1	2.0	1st place, gold medalist(s)
Anjelika Krylova; Oleg Ovsyannikov	Ice dance	2	2	2	2	4.0	2nd place, silver medalist(s)
Irina Lobacheva; Ilia Averbukh	Ice dance	4	5	5	5	9.8	5

== Freestyle skiing ==
Men

Athlete	Event	Qualifying		Final	
Athlete	Event	Points	Rank	Points	Rank
Vitali Glushchenko	Moguls	did not finish		did not advance	
Andrei Ivanov	Moguls	18.73	27	did not advance	
Aleksandr Mikhaylov	Aerials	246.21	3 Q	229.98	6
Yevgeni Sennikov	Moguls	22.76	24	did not advance	

Women

Athlete	Event	Qualifying		Final	
Athlete	Event	Points	Rank	Points	Rank
Lyudmila Dymchenko	Moguls	22.53	7 Q	21.02	15
Yelena Korolyova	Moguls	20.97	17	did not advance	
Nataliya Orekhova	Aerials	118.61	22	did not advance	
Nadezhda Radovitskaya	Moguls	13.41	25	did not advance	
Yelena Vorona	Moguls	20.54	18	did not advance	

== Ice hockey ==
Men

- Head coach: (Russia) Vladimir Yurzinov

Pos.	No.	Player	Team
GK	1	Oleg Shevtsov	(Russia) Severstal Cherepovets
GK	34	Andrei Trefilov	(United States) Chicago Blackhawks
GK	35	Mikhail Shtalenkov	(United States) Mighty Ducks of Anaheim
D	2	Boris Mironov	(Canada) Edmonton Oilers
D	3	Dmitri Yushkevich	(Canada) Toronto Maple Leafs
D	5	Alexei Gusarov	(United States) Colorado Avalanche
D	11	Darius Kasparaitis	(United States) Pittsburgh Penguins
D	15	Dmitri Mironov	(United States) Mighty Ducks of Anaheim
D	29	Igor Kravchuk	(Canada) Ottawa Senators
D	44	Alexei Zhitnik	(United States) Buffalo Sabres
D	55	Sergei Gonchar	(United States) Washington Capitals
F	8	Sergei Nemchinov	(United States) New York Islanders
F	9	Sergei Krivokrasov	(United States) Chicago Blackhawks
F	10	Pavel Bure	(Canada) Vancouver Canucks
F	13	Valeri Kamensky	(United States) Colorado Avalanche
F	14	German Titov	(Canada) Calgary Flames
F	19	Alexei Yashin	(Canada) Ottawa Senators
F	20	Valeri Bure	(Canada) Calgary Flames
F	24	Aleksey Morozov	(United States) Pittsburgh Penguins
F	25	Valeri Zelepukin	(Canada) Edmonton Oilers
F	33	Alexei Zhamnov	(United States) Chicago Blackhawks
F	51	Andrei Kovalenko	(Canada) Edmonton Oilers
F	91	Sergei Fedorov	(United States) Detroit Red Wings

Preliminary round

Team	GP	W	L	T	GF	GA	PTS
Russia	3	3	0	0	15	6	6
Czech Republic	3	2	1	0	12	4	4
Finland	3	1	2	0	11	15	2
Kazakhstan	3	0	3	0	6	25	0

13 February 1998	Russia	9–2 (2–1, 5–0, 2–1)	Kazakhstan	Aqua Wing Arena; Attendance: 3752

Mikhail Shtalenkov (out 50:46)
Andrei Trefilov (in 50:46)
Goalies
Vitaliy Yeremeyev (out 32:14)
Aleksandr Shimin (in 32:14)

Fedorov (Kovalenko) – 1:30	1–0
	1–1	2:15 – Sagymbayev (Pchelyakov)
Yashin (Fedorov) – 8:15	2–1
Yashin (Kasparaitis)- 20:55	3–1
P. Bure (D. Mironov) – 27:34	4–1
P. Bure – 32:01	5–1
Kovalenko – 32:14	6–1
Titov (Kamensky, Morozov) – 38:39	7–1
Kovalenko (B. Mironov) – 45:09	8–1
Zelepukin (Morozov) – 55:46	9–1
	9–2	57:40 – E. Koreshkov (Shafranov, A. Koreshkov)

6 min
Penalties
8 min
31
Shots
18

14 February 1998	Russia	4–3 (1–2, 2–1, 1–0)	Finland	Big Hat; Attendance: 9894

Andrei Trefilov
Goalies
Jarmo Myllys
Referee:
(Canada) Bill McCreary

	0–1	6:11 – Koivu (Lehtinen, Selänne) (PP)
	0–2	7:04 – Lehtinen (Koivu, Selänne) PP
P. Bure (Fedorov, Kamensky) – 13:36 PP	1–2
	1–3	8:24 – Lehtinen (Selänne)
Nemchinov (Gonchar, Kravchuk) – 29:31	2–3
Yashin (Fedorov, Zhitnik)- 35:03 PP	3–3
Morozov (Zelepukin) – 56:43	4–3

24 min
Penalties
24 min
28
Shots
33

16 February 1998	Russia	2–1 (0–0, 0–1, 2–0)	Czech Republic	Big Hat; Attendance: 9847

Mikhail Shtalenkov
Goalies
Dominik Hašek
Referee:
(Canada) Kerry Fraser

	0–1	31:53 – Reichel (Patera) (PP)
V. Bure (Kravchuk, Gonchar) – 43:27	1–1
Zhamnov (Gusarov, D. Mironov) – 43:37	2–1

6 min
Penalties
14 min
24
Shots
31

Play-off

Quarterfinal

18 February 1998	Russia	4–1 (1–0, 1–0, 2–1)	Belarus	Aqua Wing Arena; Attendance: 4628

Mikhail Shtalenkov
Goalies
Andrei Mezin
Referee:
(United States) Mark Faucette

Kamensky (Yashin) – 19:00	1–0
Kovalenko (Fedorov, Yashin) – 21:31	2–0
P. Bure – 42:38	3–0
Morozov (Zelepukin, Kasparaitis) – 43:19	4–0
	4–1	44:18 – Yerkovich (Khmyl, Roshchin)

16 min
Penalties
10 min
35
Shots
26

Semifinal

20 February 1998	Finland	4–7 (0–2, 3–2, 1–3)	Russia	Big Hat; Attendance: 9640

Jarmo Myllys
Goalies
Mikhail Shtalenkov
Referee:
(Canada) Kerry Fraser

	0–1	9:51 – P. Bure (Zhamnov) (PP)
	0–2	17:28 – P. Bure (D. Mironov
	0–3	20:59 – P. Bure
Helminen (Lind) – 23:28	1–3
Rintanen (Kurri, Timonen) – 24:59	2–3
Selänne (Kurri, Koivu) – 34:07	3–3
	3–4	37:26 – Zhamnov (Zhitnik) PP
Koivu (Selänne) – 45:15	4–4
	4–5	46:33 – Kovalenko (Fedorov)
	4–6	55:58 – P. Bure
	4–7	59:55 – P. Bure (EN)

6 min
Penalties
12 min
32
Shots
21

Final

21 February 1998	Czech Republic	1–0 (0–0, 0–0, 1–1)	Russia	Big Hat; Attendance: 10 010

Dominik Hašek	Goalies	Mikhail Shtalenkov	Referee: (Canada) Bill McCreary
Svoboda (Patera, Procházka) – 48:08 / 1–0			Referee: (Canada) Bill McCreary
8 min	Penalties	4 min	Referee: (Canada) Bill McCreary
21	Shots	20	Referee: (Canada) Bill McCreary

Silver

== Luge ==
Athlete	Event	Final					
Athlete	Event	Run 1	Run 2	Run 3	Run 4	Total	Rank
Albert Demtschenko	Men's singles	50.224	50.011	DQ		did not finish	
Alexandr Zubkov	Men's singles	50.488	50.944	50.650	50.619	3:22.701	20
Irina Gubkina	Women's singles	52.295	52.199	52.107	51.514	3:28.115	18
Margarita Klimenko	Women's singles	52.391	52.123	51.789	51.448	3:27.751	17
Danil Chaban; Viktor Kneib	Doubles	51.370	51.023			1:42.393	9
Albert Demtschenko; Semen Kolobayev	Doubles	51.515	51.041			1:42.556	10

== Nordic combined ==
Athlete	Event	Ski jumping		Cross-country		
Athlete	Event	Points	Rank	Deficit	Time	Rank
Alexey Fadeyev	Individual 15 km	195.5	33	4:33	48:19.7 +6:58.6	37
Dmitry Sinitsyn	Individual 15 km	213.5	14	2:45	43:48.0 +2:26.9	10
Valeri Stolyarov	Individual 15 km	235.0	2	0:36	41:49.3 +28.2	3rd place, bronze medalist(s)
Denis Tishagin	Individual 15 km	198.5	31	4:15	did not finish	
Alexey Fadeyev; Vladimir Lysenin; Dmitry Sinitsyn; Valeri Stolyarov	Team	826.0	8	2:13	58:34.2 +4:22.7	9

== Short track speed skating ==
Women

Athlete	Event	Heat		Quarterfinal		Semifinal		Final	
Athlete	Event	Time	Rank	Time	Rank	Time	Rank	Time	Rank
Marina Pylayeva	500 m	46.359	2 Q	46.220	3	did not advance			12
Marina Pylayeva	1000 m	1:39.340	4	did not advance					26
Yelena Tikhanina	500 m	46.980	2 Q	46.206	3	did not advance			11
Yelena Tikhanina	1000 m	1:39.242	4	did not advance					25

== Ski jumping ==
Athlete	Event	First round		Final		
Athlete	Event	Points	Rank	Points	Total	Rank
Arthur Khamidulin	Normal hill	90.5	26	96.0	186.5	25
Arthur Khamidulin	Large hill	109.6	15	107.6	217.2	23
Valery Kobelev	Normal hill	68.0	54	did not advance		54
Valery Kobelev	Large hill	92.9	35	did not advance		35
Nikolai Petrushin	Normal hill	79.5	42	did not advance		42
Nikolai Petrushin	Large hill	66.1	54	did not advance		54
Aleksandr Volkov	Normal hill	90.5	26	93.5	184.0	27
Aleksandr Volkov	Large hill	98.3	27	81.2	179.5	27
Nikolai Petrushin; Arthur Khamidulin; Aleksandr Volkov; Valery Kobelev	Team	264.9	9	374.8	639.7	9

== Speed skating ==
Men

Athlete	Event	Race 1		Race 2		Final	
Athlete	Event	Time	Rank	Time	Rank	Time	Rank
Andrey Anufriyenko	1000 m					1:12.61	23
Andrey Anufriyenko	1500 m					1:50.99	10
Aleksandr Golubev	500 m	36.67	21	36.54	21	73.21	20
Aleksandr Kibalko	500 m	37.32	38	36.86	28	74.18	33
Aleksandr Kibalko	1000 m					1:12.94	28
Aleksandr Kibalko	1500 m					1:52.27	22
Sergey Klevchenya	500 m	36.56	15	36.30	10	72.86	14
Sergey Klevchenya	1000 m					1:13.51	33
Yuri Kokhanets	5000 m					6:47.21	22
Andrei Krivosheyev	5000 m					6:46.57	20
Sergey Savelyev	500 m	Disqualified					
Vadim Sayutin	1500 m					1:51.31	11
Vadim Sayutin	5000 m					6:39.92	15
Vadim Sayutin	10000 m					13:54.57	13
Dmitri Shepel	1000 m					1:13.31	32
Dmitri Shepel	1500 m					1:51.64	14

Women

Athlete	Event	Race 1		Race 2		Final	
Athlete	Event	Time	Rank	Time	Rank	Time	Rank
Varvara Barysheva	1500 m					2:03.34	20
Svetlana Bazhanova	1500 m					2:01.54	9
Svetlana Bazhanova	3000 m					4:16.45	10
Tatyana Danshina	500 m	40.53	29	40.59	29	81.12	28
Tatyana Danshina	1000 m					1:19.95	19
Nataliya Polozkova	1000 m					1:19.78	17
Nataliya Polozkova	1500 m					2:01.56	10
Oksana Ravilova	500 m	39.99	21	40.04	21	80.03	21
Anna Savelyeva	1000 m					1:21.83	27
Tatyana Trapeznikova	1500 m					2:03.25	19
Tatyana Trapeznikova	3000 m					4:17.76	13
Svetlana Vysokova	3000 m					4:17.70	12
Svetlana Vysokova	5000 m					7:22.18	12
Svetlana Zhurova	500 m	39.11	7	39.38	11	78.49	9
Svetlana Zhurova	1000 m					1:19.04	12
