= Venues of the 1998 Winter Olympics =

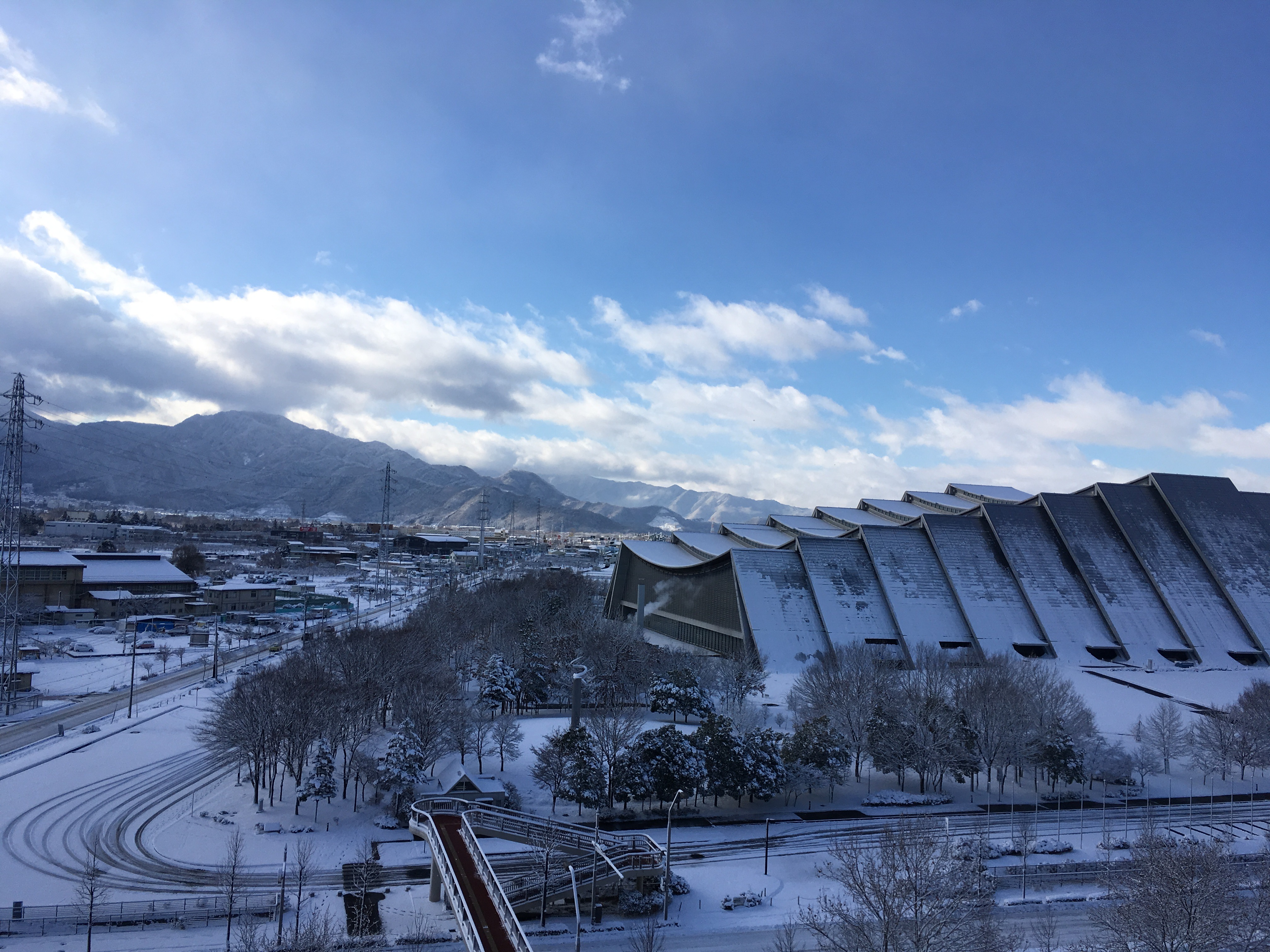
M-Wave (pictured in 2019) hosted the long track speed skating events for the 1998 Winter Olympics

For the 1998 Winter Olympics in Nagano, Japan, a total of fifteen sports venues were used. Nagano had attempted twice to host the Winter Olympics, losing out to Sapporo, host of the 1972 Winter Olympics. The third time, in 1991, Nagano edged out Salt Lake City to host the 1998 Games. The biathlon venue was adjusted in accordance with the Washington Convention over endangered species. The biggest venue controversy was at Happo'one resort on the length of the men's downhill and the battle that ensued to the point where skiing officials threatened to pull the event entirely before a compromise was reached three months before the Olympics. M-Wave has hosted three World Speed Skating Championships since the Olympics, while the Spiral has hosted a couple of world championships in bobsleigh, luge and skeleton.

== Venues ==
Venue	Photo	Sports	Capacity	Ref.
Aqua Wing		Ice hockey	6,000	
Big Hat		Ice hockey (final)	10,104	
Hakuba Ski Jumping Stadium		Nordic combined (ski jumping), Ski jumping	45,000	
Happo'one Resort		Alpine skiing (downhill, super g, combined)	20,000	
Iizuna Kogen Ski Area		Freestyle skiing	12,000	
Kanbayashi Snowboard Park		Snowboarding (halfpipe)	10,000	
Kazakoshi Park Arena		Curling	1,924	
M-Wave		Speed skating	10,000	
Minami Nagano Sports Park		Ceremonies (opening/ closing)	50,000	
Mount Higashidate		Alpine skiing (giant slalom)	20,000	
Mount Yakebitai		Alpine skiing (slalom), Snowboarding (giant slalom)	20,000	
Nozawa Onsen Ski Resort		Biathlon	20,000	
Snow Harp		Cross-country skiing, Nordic combined (cross-country skiing)	20,000	
Spiral		Bobsleigh, Luge	10,000	
White Ring		Figure skating, Short track speed skating	7,351	

== Before the Olympics ==
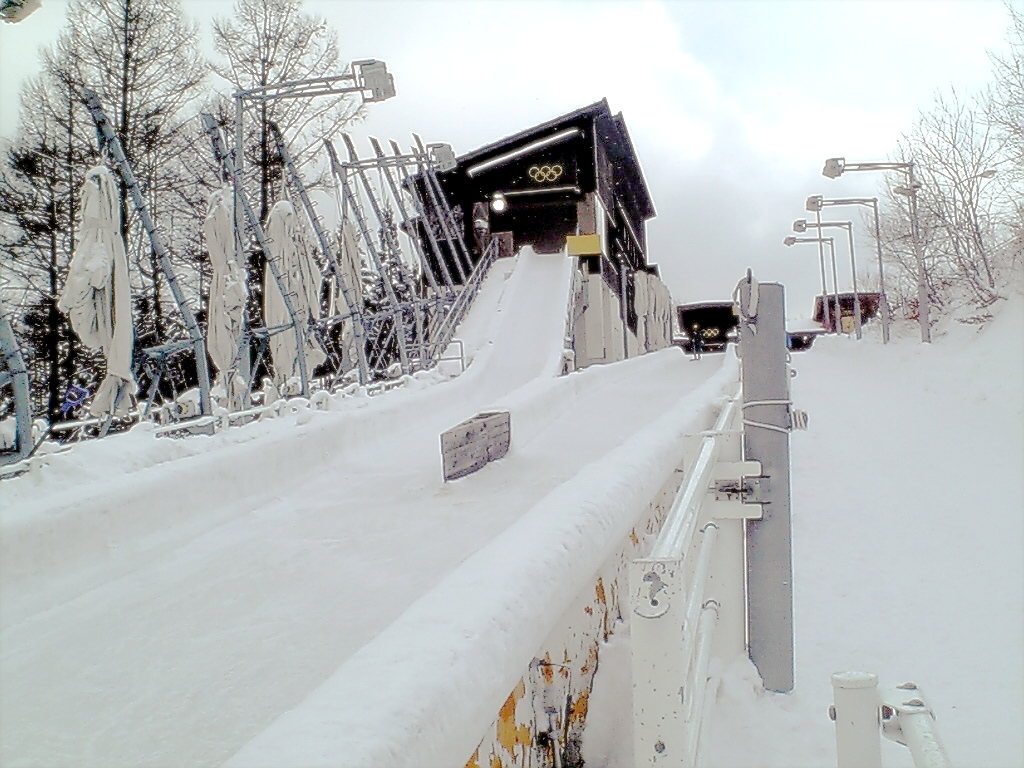
The Spiral (pictured in 2007) hosted the bobsleigh and luge events for the 1998 Winter Olympics

Nagano first attempted to host the Winter Olympics in 1940, but lost out to Sapporo. Those Olympics were abandoned in 1937, when Japan invaded China for the second time, forcing Sapporo's withdrawal. The city tried again for the Winter Olympics in 1968 in 1961, but lost out in domestic voting to Sapporo who in turn lost out to Grenoble, France in 1964. Sapporo would host the Winter Olympics finally in 1972. A third time for the Winter Olympics began in 1983, with a full bid for the Winter Games approved two years later. With the bid committee established in 1986 and lessons learned from previous mistakes, Nagano's bid for the Winter Olympics in Japan was approved in 1989. A revamped bid committee was launched later that year with presentations given to the International Olympic Committee (IOC) in 1990. When the IOC session was held in Tokyo in September 1990, Nagano was among the cities launching promotional campaign for the 1998 Winter Olympics. The following June at the IOC session in Birmingham, England, Nagano was awarded the 1998 Games in the fifth round, defeating Salt Lake City, Utah in the United States by four votes.

Karuizawa, near Nagano, played host to the World Allround Speed Skating Championships in 1963 and the World Sprint Speed Skating Championships in 1986. For the 1964 Summer Olympics in Tokyo, Karuizawa played host to the equestrian events.

Site selection for events were adjusted between the time of bidding and the actual games. For alpine skiing, women's downhill, women's super-g, women's giant slalom, and men's giant slalom were moved from Mount Higashidate to Mount Yakebitai following a 1993 inspection by the International Ski Federation (FIS). Biathlon was planned to be at a new venue in the Kamishiro area of Habuka. The venue was moved to Nozawa Onsen Ski Resort following an environmental assessment of the area that included nests of goshawks and buzzards under CITES, the 1973 global endangered species act better known as the "Washington Convention", before construction began. Figure skating was planned originally for a municipally owned gymnasium in Nagano, but was abandoned to it not having enough room for expansion. Meanwhile, short track speed skating was planned to take place on renovated city property, but the venue's popularity with local residents changed that plan. As a result, White Ring Arena was constructed to accommodate both figure and short track speed skating. Alpine combined was set to have the downhill part at Happo'one Resort and the slalom part at Mount Yakebitai, but the logistical differences in adverse weather conditions forced the slalom part to be moved to Happo'one Resort.

Venue construction started in 1990, and was completed prior to the 1998 Winter Games. Temporary facility construction started in June 1997, and was completed in time for the 1998 Games.

For test events, M-Wave Arena in Nagano hosted the World Allround Speed Skating Championships in 1997. That same year, the Iizuna Kogen Ski Area hosted the FIS Freestyle World Ski Championships. The biggest test event controversy occurred at the Happo'one Resort for the men's downhill event in February 1996, when the FIS, supported by most of the leading skiers, stated that the 1.68 km (1.04 mi) was too short. The request by FIS and the skiers was to move the start of the course up either by 0.12 km (0.075 mi) or 15 seconds. The Nagano Organizing Committee (NAOC) refused to move the course on the grounds that it be moved into a protected national park Special Zone and that it would contradict one of NAOC's Vision of Coexistence with the environment. The FIS pointed out that over 600,000 skiers annually participated in that zone annually, and questioned why Olympic-class skiers could not compete in that same area. A threat to not hold the event in Japan was also issued by the FIS. It would not be until 1–2 November 1997 before a compromise could be reached among the FIS, IOC, and NAOC, where the start was moved up 0.085 km (0.053 mi) to its final length of 1.765 km (1.097 mi).

== During the Olympics ==
Kazakoshi Park Arena in Karuizawa gave the city its distinction as the only first to ever host both Summer and Winter Olympic events (Several venues for the 2008 Summer Olympics in Beijing were reused when the city hosted the Winter Olympics 14 years later.).

Weather was a major role in the outdoor events. Heavy rain at the Spiral cancelled the second run of the bobsleigh four-man event. Seven of the ten events in alpine skiing were delayed by weather, four of which were the women's.

Snow Harp had the men's 30 km take place after 18 hours of heavy, wet snowfall which was won by Finland's Mika Myllylä. The women's 5 km event was held in a snowstorm while the women's 10 km combined event was held during a steady rain. Both events were won by Russia's Larissa Lazutina. In the men's 4 x 10 km relay, Norway avenged their loss to Italy in this event four years earlier at Lillehammer, with Thomas Alsgaard edging out Silvio Fauner by 0.2 seconds, the closest event finish in Olympic history.

During the ski jumping individual normal hill event at the Hakuba Ski Jumping Stadium, the final two jumpers on the second jump were delayed from their jumps to high winds. Finland's Jani Soininen jumped 89 meters to advance one point ahead of Japan's Kazuyoshi Funaki. Funaki's teammate Masahiko Harada, who led after the first jump, needed a jump of 88 meters to win gold, but only jumped 84.5 meters and ended up in fifth place. Soininen would later complain bitterly about the officials' decision despite his gold medal win. In the individual large hill event, Funaki jumped so far that he landed beyond the video measuring area which resulted in the distance being measured manually. Funaki's jump was recorded as 132.5 meters and it also garnered perfect style points. The Japanese ski jumper would win gold in the event.

Both Nordic combined events had their cross-country portions held in pouring rains. Norway won the team event while Norwegian Bjarte Engen Vik won the individual event.

Fog led to cancellation of the biathlon's men's 10 km sprint event and a rescheduling of the event the following day. At the time of the cancellation, 16 of the 73 skiers had completed the course, including the leader Alexandr Popov of Belarus. When the race was rerun the next day, Popov skied poorly and finished 55th, leading Belarusian president Alexander Lukashenko, who was present at the first race, to call the cancellation "a mafia-style injustice". The rerun race would be won by Norway's Ole Einar Bjørndalen, who was leading Popov during the first run after 8 km before the event was cancelled.

Gusty winds at the Iizuna Kogen Ski Area affected the women's aerials freestyle skiing event, which was won by America's Nikki Stone.

== After the Olympics ==
M-Wave Arena hosted the World Sprint Speed Skating Championships in 2004. The arena hosted the World Single Distance Championships in 2000 and 2008.

The Spiral hosted the skeleton portion of the FIBT World Championships in 2003. The following year, the venue hosted the FIL World Luge Championships, the only time the championships have taken place in Asia as of 2017.
