= Cross-country skiing at the 1998 Winter Olympics – Men's 50 kilometre freestyle =

Men's 50 kilometre freestyle at the XVIII Olympic Winter Games
- Venue: Snow Harp
- Dates: 22 February 1998
- Competitors: 79 from 28 nations
- Winning time: 2:05:08.2

Medalists
1st place, gold medalist(s)		Bjørn Dæhlie; Norway
2nd place, silver medalist(s)		Niklas Jonsson; Sweden
3rd place, bronze medalist(s)		Christian Hoffmann; Austria

The men's 50 kilometre freestyle cross-country skiing competition at the 1998 Winter Olympics in Nagano, Japan, was held on 22 February at Snow Harp. The competitors started with a 30-second interval.

== Results ==
The results:

Rank	Bib	Name	Country	Time	Deficit
1st place, gold medalist(s)	3	Bjørn Dæhlie	Norway	2:05:08.2	—
2nd place, silver medalist(s)	2	Niklas Jonsson	Sweden	2:05:16.3	+8.1
3rd place, bronze medalist(s)	4	Christian Hoffmann	Austria	2:06:01.8	+53.6
4	18	Alexey Prokourorov	Russia	2:06:41.5	+1:33.3
5	6	Fulvio Valbusa	Italy	2:06:44.3	+1:36.1
6	5	Thomas Alsgaard	Norway	2:07:21.5	+2:13.3
7	7	Johann Mühlegg	Germany	2:07:25.3	+2:17.1
8	1	Vladimir Smirnov	Kazakhstan	2:07:26.4	+2:18.2
9	15	Maurizio Pozzi	Italy	2:08:13.2	+3:05.0
10	14	Silvio Fauner	Italy	2:08:44.3	+3:36.1
11	9	Anders Eide	Norway	2:11:06.9	+5:58.7
12	8	Alois Stadlober	Austria	2:11:22.4	+6:14.2
13	12	Luboš Buchta	Czech Republic	2:11:34.8	+6:26.6
14	25	Hervé Balland	France	2:11:55.9	+6:47.7
15	24	Andrei Noutrikhine	Russia	2:12:21.9	+7:13.7
16	16	Pietro Piller Cottrer	Italy	2:12:37.9	+7:29.7
17	47	Petr Michl	Czech Republic	2:13:08.3	+8:00.1
18	21	Jeremias Wigger	Switzerland	2:13:50.5	+8:42.3
19	20	Ivan Batory	Slovakia	2:13:54.5	+8:46.3
20	17	Mathias Fredriksson	Sweden	2:14:05.9	+8:57.7
21	26	Vincent Vittoz	France	2:14:16.2	+9:08.0
22	34	Wilhelm Aschwanden	Switzerland	2:14:18.0	+9:09.8
23	35	Andrey Nevzorov	Kazakhstan	2:15:14.7	+10:06.5
24	13	Tor Arne Hetland	Norway	2:15:21.7	+10:13.5
25	27	Jordi Ribo	Spain	2:16:04.8	+10:56.6
26	59	René Sommerfeldt	Germany	2:16:19.9	+11:11.7
27	50	Alexander Sannikov	Belarus	2:16:34.4	+11:26.2
28	31	Stephan Kunz	Liechtenstein	2:16:36.2	+11:28.0
29	46	Donghai Qu	China	2:16:42.3	+11:34.1
30	33	Hiroyuki Imai	Japan	2:16:49.5	+11:41.3
31	64	Sergei Dolidovich	Belarus	2:17:07.5	+11:59.3
32	79	Mitsuo Horigome	Japan	2:17:09.2	+12:01.0
33	65	Kazutoshi Nagahama	Japan	2:17:24.4	+12:16.2
34	10	Torgny Mogren	Sweden	2:17:28.8	+12:20.6
35	45	Marcus Nash	United States	2:17:37.8	+12:29.6
36	41	Andreas Schlütter	Germany	2:17:52.1	+12:43.9
37	76	Maxim Pitchouguine	Russia	2:18:19.1	+13:10.9
38	43	Achim Walcher	Austria	2:18:31.7	+13:23.5
39	42	Katsuhito Ebisawa	Japan	2:18:52.5	+13:44.3
40	39	Janusz Krężelok	Poland	2:19:04.4	+13:56.2
41	37	Michael Binzer	Denmark	2:19:20.7	+14:12.5
42	52	Alvaro Gijon	Spain	2:20:24.7	+15:16.5
43	71	Olexander Zarovnyi	Ukraine	2:20:31.0	+15:22.8
44	22	Patrick Weaver	United States	2:20:37.7	+15:29.5
45	75	Vladimir Bortsov	Kazakhstan	2:20:39.3	+15:31.1
46	66	Mikhailo Artyukhov	Ukraine	2:20:59.2	+15:51.0
47	67	Jiri Magal	Czech Republic	2:21:30.5	+16:22.3
48	32	Anthony Evans	Australia	2:21:44.4	+16:36.2
49	63	Reto Burgermeister	Switzerland	2:22:28.3	+17:20.1
50	36	Nikolay Popovich	Ukraine	2:22:48.0	+17:39.8
51	57	Vladislavas Zybailo	Lithuania	2:23:34.6	+18:26.4
52	68	Marc Gilbertson	United States	2:24:37.5	+19:29.3
53	53	John Bauer	United States	2:24:45.4	+19:37.2
54	38	Juha Alm	Finland	2:25:00.2	+19:52.0
55	54	Vitaly Lilitchenko	Kazakhstan	2:25:58.0	+20:49.8
56	30	Chris Blanchard	Canada	2:26:58.9	+21:50.7
57	19	Aleksandr Ushkalenko	Ukraine	2:27:09.1	+22:00.9
58	58	Robin McKeever	Canada	2:28:19.0	+23:10.8
59	62	Paul Gray	Australia	2:29:08.2	+24:00.0
60	44	Roberts Raimo	Latvia	2:30:49.9	+25:41.7
61	23	Doo Sun Sin	South Korea	2:33:27.3	+28:19.1
62	77	Guido Visser	Canada	2:33:49.7	+28:41.5
DNF	11	Henrik Forsberg	Sweden	—	—
DNF	28	Melis Aasmäe	Estonia	—	—
DNF	29	Ricardas Panavas	Lithuania	—	—
DNF	40	Juan Jesús Gutiérrez	Spain	—	—
DNF	48	Donald Farley	Canada	—	—
DNF	49	Zsolt Antal	Romania	—	—
DNF	51	Viatscheslav Plaksunov	Belarus	—	—
DNF	56	Gerhard Urain	Austria	—	—
DNF	60	Martin Bajcicak	Slovakia	—	—
DNF	61	Grigory Menshenin	Russia	—	—
DNF	69	Nikolai Semeniako	Belarus	—	—
DNF	74	Ivan Hudac	Slovakia	—	—
DNF	78	Haritz Zunzunegui	Spain	—	—
DNS	55	Patrick Remy	France	—	—
DNS	70	Lukas Bauer	Czech Republic	—	—
DNS	72	Beat Koch	Switzerland	—	—
DNS	73	Philippe Sanchez	France	—	—
