= Asahi Station (Nagano) =

Railway station in Nagano, Nagano Prefecture, Japan

Asahi Station 朝陽駅
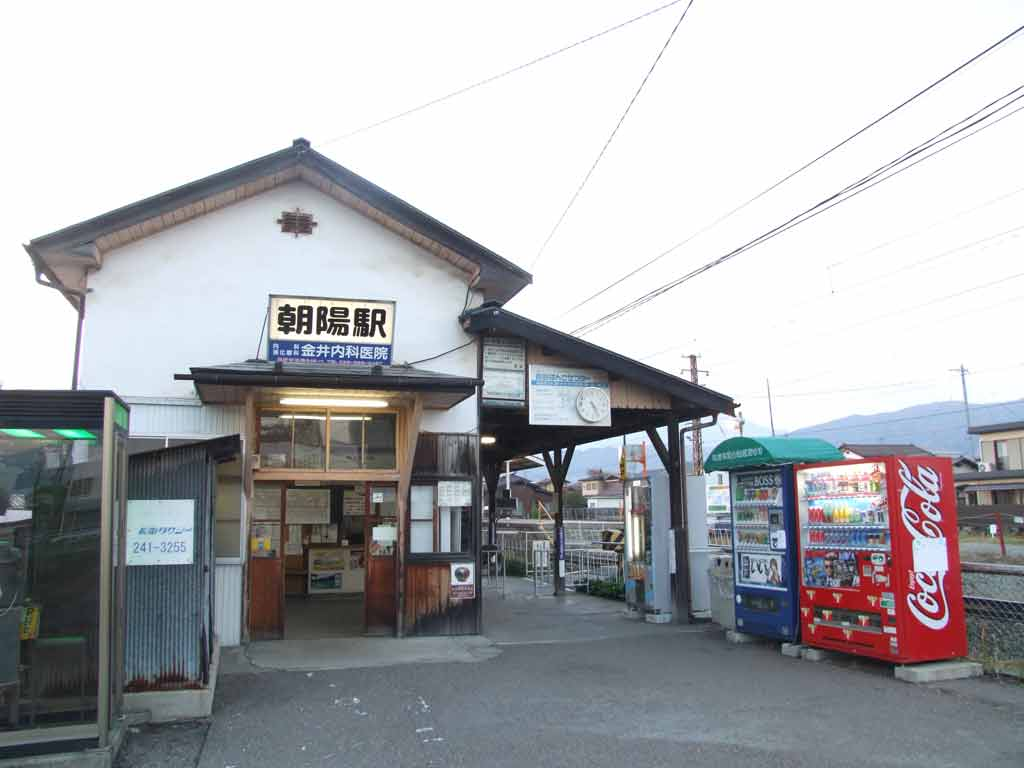
- Asahi Station in November 2007

General information
- Location: 191-1 Minamibori, Nagano-shi, Nagano-ken 381-0016; Japan
- Coordinates: 36°39′58.2″N 138°14′29.0″E
- Operator: Nagano Electric Railway
- Line: ■ Nagano Electric Railway Nagano Line
- Distance: 6.3 km from Nagano
- Platforms: 1 island platform
- Tracks: 2

Other information
- Station code: N8
- Website: Official website

History
- Opened: 28 June 1926

Passengers
- FY2016: 1061
Location
- Location within Japan

Asahi Station (朝陽駅, Asahi-eki) is a railway station on the Nagano Line in the northeastern part of the city of Nagano, Japan. It is owned and operated by the private railway operating company Nagano Electric Railway. Asahi Station is the closest railroad station to the Aqua Wing Arena which was the B-Arena for ice hockey at the 1998 Winter Olympics. Aqua Wing, today, is a public pool located in Nagano Sports Park (長野運動公園, Nagano undou kouen).

== Lines ==
Asahi Station is a station on the Nagano Electric Railway Nagano Line. It is 6.3 kilometers from the terminus of the line at Nagano Station and 27 km from the opposite terminus at Yudanaka Station. Both the local train and Express B trains stop at Asahi Station.

== Station layout ==
The station consists of one ground-level island platform serving two tracks, connected to the station building by a level crossing. The staffed station building itself consists of one automatic ticket machine. Station staff manually collect tickets from arriving passengers. Departing passengers do not need to show their tickets.

At the western end of the platform, the train runs on parallel tracks connected by two railroad switches. At the eastern end of the platform, the tracks merge to a single track which runs to Fuzokuchūgakumae Station and then to Yanagihara Station. From Yanagihara, the track becomes dual tracked again.

From the level crossing, there are 7 steps to the platform. There is no wheelchair-accessible slope.

The station has an open bicycle parking lot.

=== Platforms ===
1	■ Nagano Electric Railway Nagano Line	for Suzaka, Shinshū-Nakano and Yudanaka
2	■ Nagano Electric Railway Nagano Line	for Gondō and Nagano

== Access ==
The Nagano City Busy, "Tohoku Gururingo" stops at Asahi Station.

== Adjacent stations ==
«	Service	»
Nagano Electric Railway
Express-A: Does not stop at this station
Shinano-Yoshida	Express-B	Suzaka
Shinano-Yoshida	Local	Fuzokuchūgakumae

== History ==
The station opened on 28 June 1926.

CTC signaling between Asahi and Yudanaka Station was commissioned in 1980.

== Passenger statistics ==
In fiscal 2016, the station was used by an average of 1061 passengers daily (boarding passengers only).

Fiscal year	Daily average
2005	989
2006	998
2007	987
2008	981
2009	980
2010	985
2011	970
2012	961
2013	959
2014	998
2015	1060
2016	1061

== Surrounding area ==
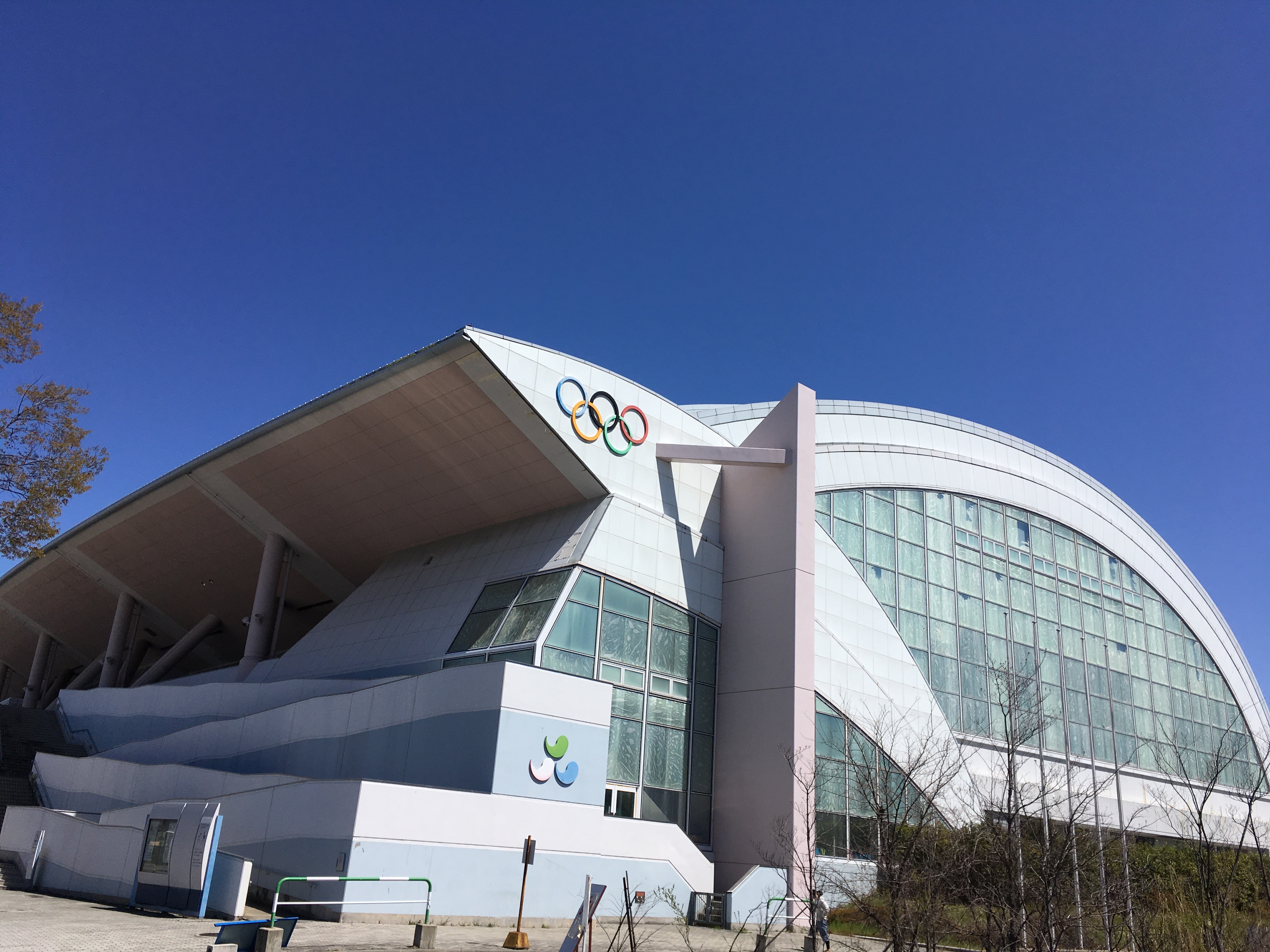
Aqua Wing Arena

- Choumeiji
- Jodoshinshuhonganji Hasaikyo Temple
- Koryuyamatsuneiwa Temple
- Hori Shrine
- Nagano Junior High School Attached to Shinshu University
- Nagano Chuo Driving School
- Fujitsu Nagano Plant
- Hokto Corporation
- Nagano Sports Park, which includes Nagano Athletic Stadium, and Aqua Wing Arena one of the host sites for the Ice hockey at the 1998 Winter Olympics
- Nagano City Hall Asahi Branch office

== See also ==
- List of railway stations in Japan
