= Nagano Sports Park =

Park in Nagano, Japan

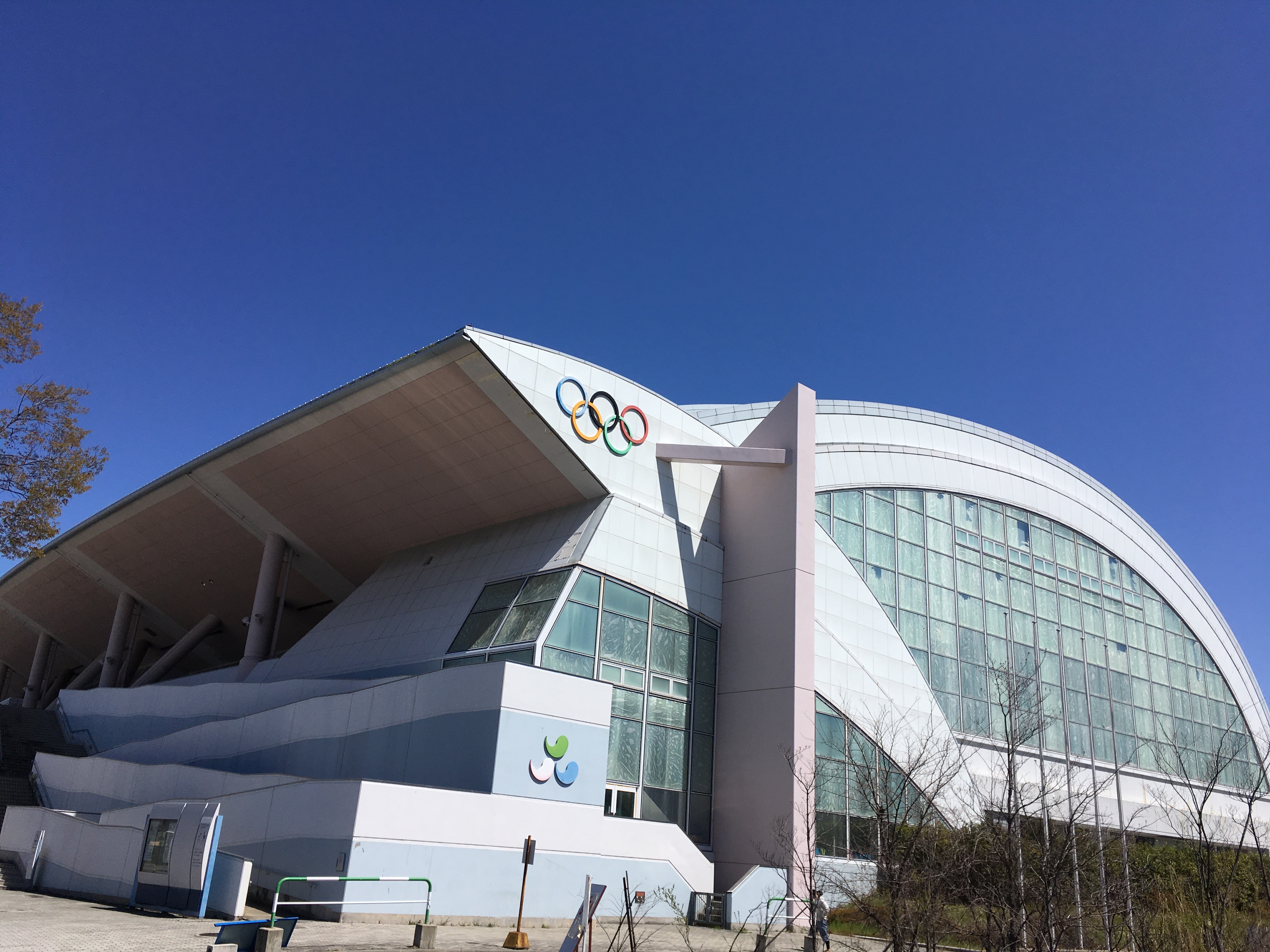
- Aqua Wing Arena in Nagano Sports Park in April 2019
- Interactive map of Nagano Sports Park
- Location: Nagano, Nagano, Japan
- Coordinates: 36.66071°N 138.23208°E
- Area: 22.2 ha (55 acres)
- Created: 1966
- Operator: Shinko Sports
- Public transit: Asahi Station, Kita-Nagano Station
- Website: https://www.aqua-wing.jp (in Japanese)

Nagano Sports Park (長野運動公園, (Nagano undou kouen)) is a park located in the Yoshida area of the city of Nagano, Nagano, Japan, approximately 5 km northeast of Nagano Station. The facilities are owned by Nagano Prefecture and by the Nagano municipal government.

The park hosted events during the 1998 Winter Olympics and the 1998 Winter Paralympics. The Nagano Olympic Commemorative Marathon begins at Nagano Sports Park. The Aqua Wing Arena located within the Sports Park will be an international pre-training camp for the 2020 Summer Olympics.

Nagano Sports Park should not be confused with the Minami Nagano Sports Park, located approximately 8 km south of Nagano Station in the Shinonoi area of the city, where the opening and closing ceremonies of the 1998 Winter Olympics were held.

== History ==
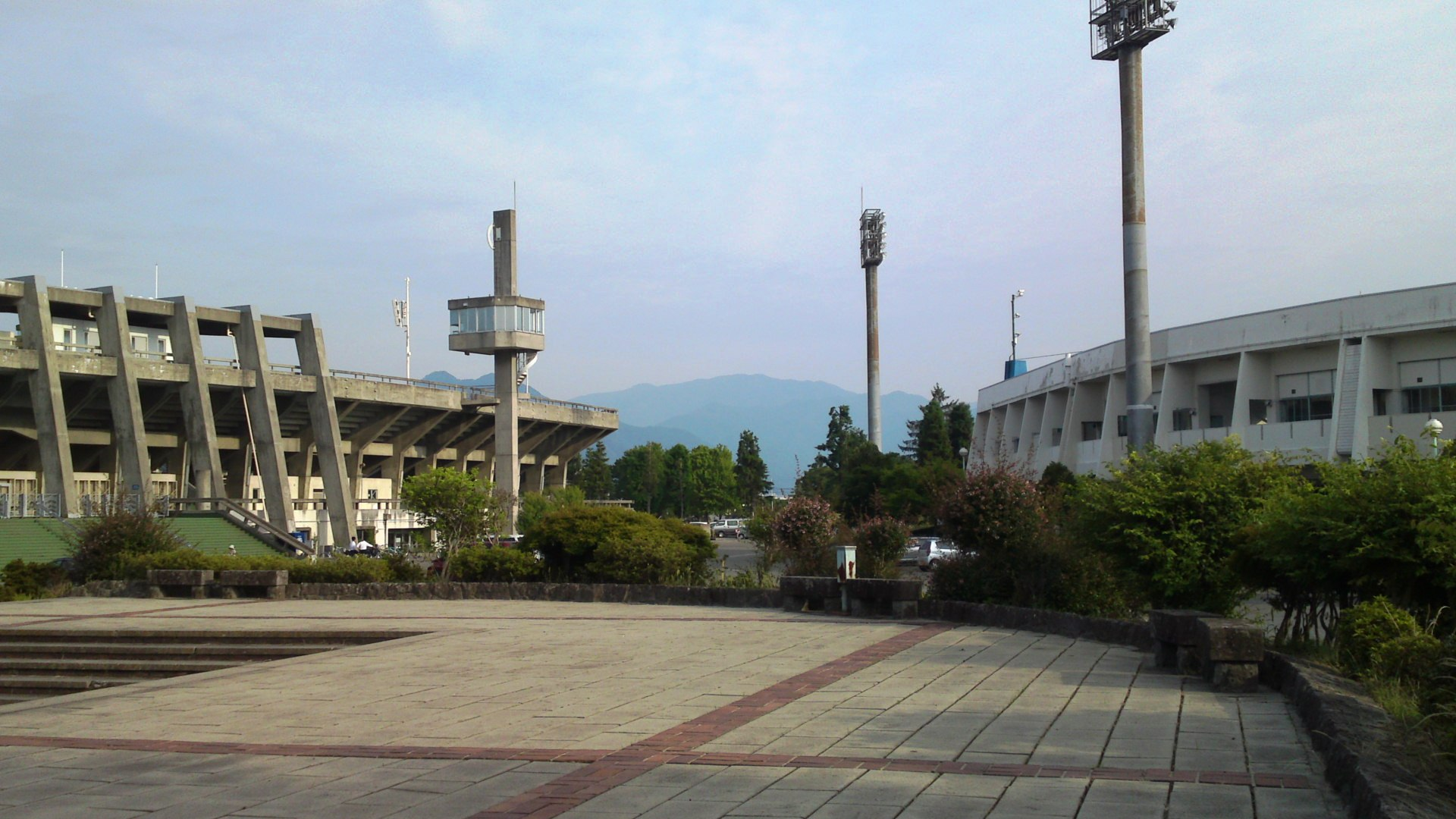
Athletic field on the left and the baseball stadium on the right

- 1966 - the park opened and the Nagano Prefectural Baseball Stadium was completed.
- 1975 - Nagano Sports Park Pool was completed.
- 1976 - Nagano Athletic Stadium was completed.
- 1977 - tennis courts were completed.
- 1978 - Nagano Sports Park Gymnasium was completed; and the 33rd National Sports Festival of Japan was held.
- 1997 - Aqua Wing Arena, the B-Venue for the ice hockey events at the 1998 Winter Games, was completed.
- 1998 - Aqua Wing Arena hosted a combined 23 women's and men's ice hockey matches during the 1998 Winter Olympics in February; and the 1998 Winter Paralympics sledge hockey events were held here in March.
- 1999 - Aqua Wing Arena was renovated and opened as the municipal pool.
- 2006 - Shinko Sports was designed as the manager of the park.

== Facilities ==
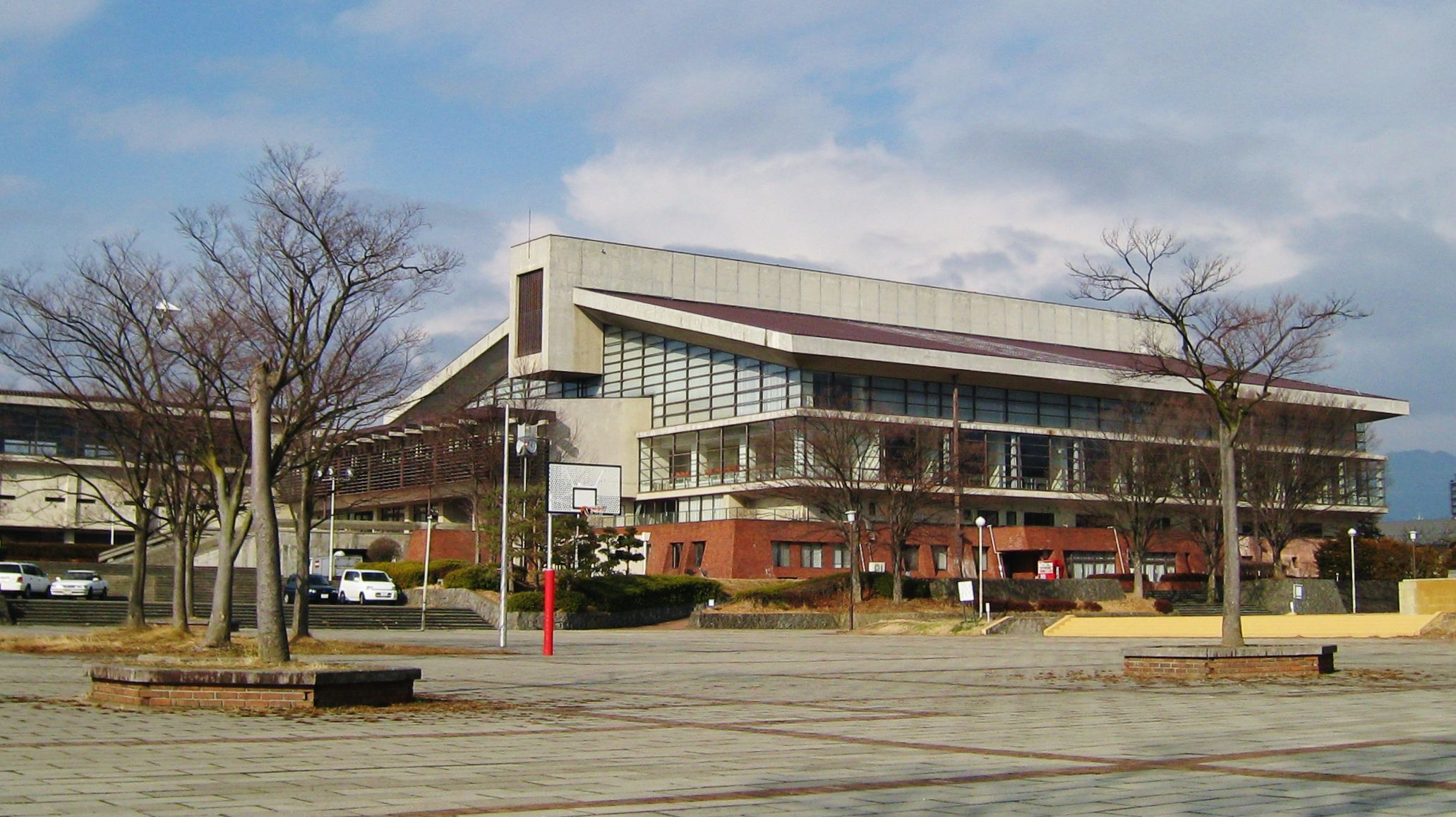
Gymnasium

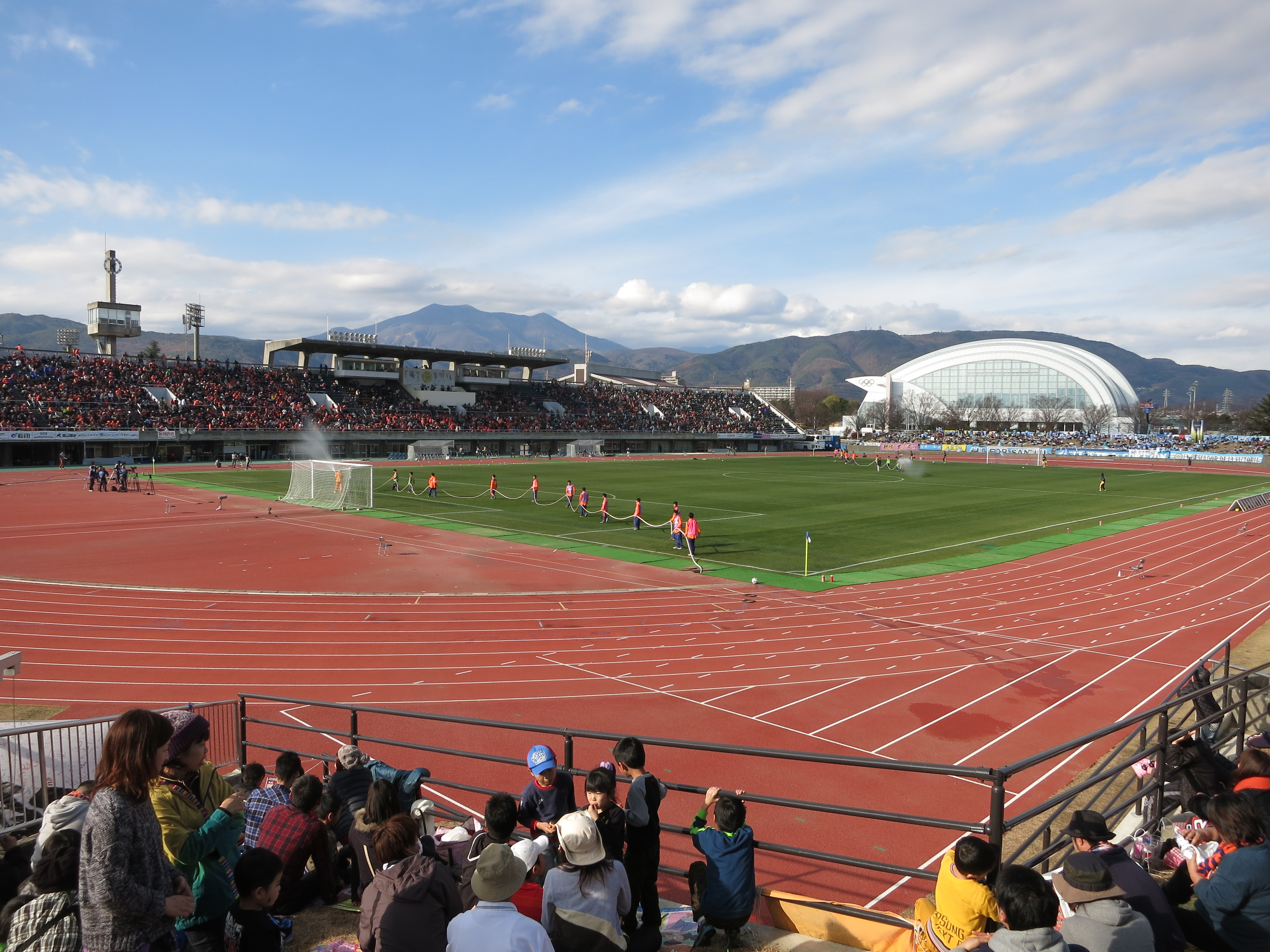
The athletic field with Mount Iizuna in the center left background and the Aqua Wing Arena in the center right

- Central square
- Walking pond
- Ikoi Forest
- Nagano Athletic Park General Sports Ground
- Pool (Aqua Wing Arena)
- General gymnasium
- Track and Field Stadium (Nagano Municipal Sports Track)
- Auxiliary stadium (sub track)
- Archery field
- Sumo ground
- Tennis court (Higashiwada tennis court)
- Open space
- Gate ball field
- Nagano Prefectural Baseball Stadium
- Nagano City Nishiwada tennis court
- Lawn square
- Children's square
- Mallet Golf Course

== Public transportation ==
- Asahi Station on the Nagano Electric Railway is approximately 15 minutes away by foot
- Kita-Nagano Station on the Shinano Railway is approximately 20 minutes away by foot
- Bus No.7 leaves from Nagano Station, passengers disembark at Undou kouen or Undou kouen higashi
