= Fuzokuchūgakumae Station =

Railway station in Nagano, Nagano Prefecture, Japan

Fuzokuchūgakumae Station 附属中学前駅
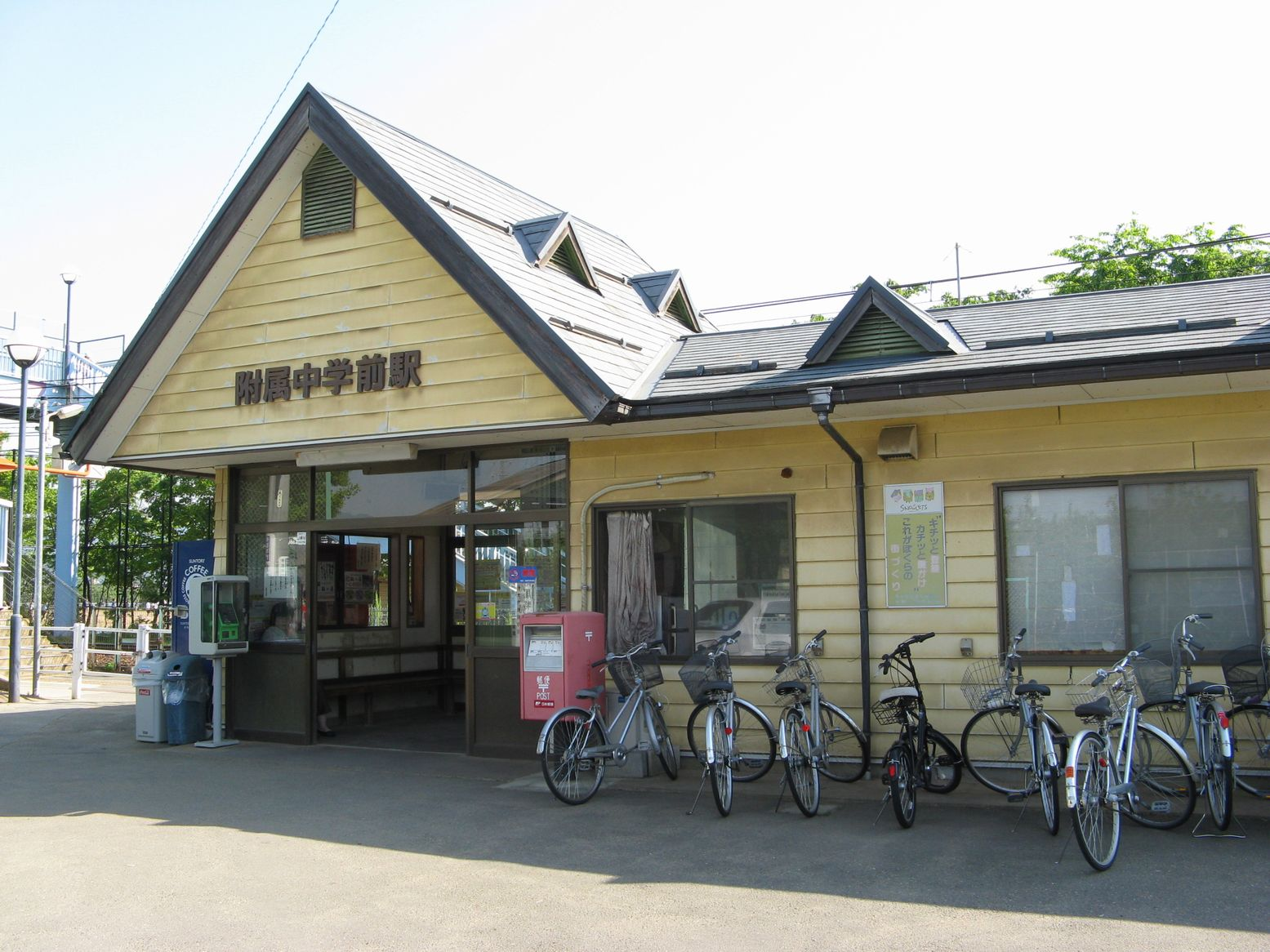
- Fuzokuchūgakumae Station in May 2009

General information
- Location: 83-1 Minamibori, Nagano-shi, Nagano-ken 381-0016; Japan
- Coordinates: 36°39′45.0″N 138°14′54″E
- Operator: Nagano Electric Railway
- Line: ■ Nagano Electric Railway Nagano Line
- Distance: 7.0 km from Nagano
- Platforms: 1 side platform
- Tracks: 1

Other information
- Station code: N9
- Website: Official website

History
- Opened: 14 March 1985

Passengers
- FY2016: 1073 daily
Location
- Location within Japan

Fuzokuchūgakumae Station (附属中学前駅, Fuzokuchūgakumae-eki) is a railway station in the city of Nagano, Japan, operated by the private railway operating company Nagano Electric Railway.

== Lines ==
Fuzokuchūgakumae Station is a station on the Nagano Electric Railway Nagano Line and is 7.0 kilometers from the terminus of the line at Nagano Station.

== Station layout ==
The station consists of one ground-level side platform serving a single bi-directional track.

== Adjacent stations ==
«	Service	»
Nagano Electric Railway
Express-A: Does not stop at this station
Express-B: Does not stop at this station
Asahi	Local	Yanagihara

== History ==
The station opened on 14 March 1985. Fuzoku Nagano Junior High School requested Nagano Dentetsu to build an adjacent station, and the station opened in response to their request.

== Passenger statistics ==
In fiscal 2016, the station was used by an average of 1073 passengers daily (boarding passengers only).

== Surrounding area ==
- Shinshu University Fuzoku Nagano Elementary School
- Shinshu University Fuzoku Nagano Middle School
- Shinshu University Department of Education Fuzoku Special Education School

== See also ==
- List of railway stations in Japan
