= Marc Gilbertson =

American cross-country skier (born 1969)

Personal information
- Nationality: American
- Born: June 3, 1969 (age 57) Bloomington, Indiana, United States

Sport
- Sport: Cross-country skiing

Marc Gilbertson (born June 3, 1969) is an American cross-country skier. He competed in the men's 50 kilometre freestyle event at the 1998 Winter Olympics.
