= Shinano-Yoshida Station =

Railway station in Nagano, Nagano Prefecture, Japan

Shinano-Yoshida Station 信濃吉田駅
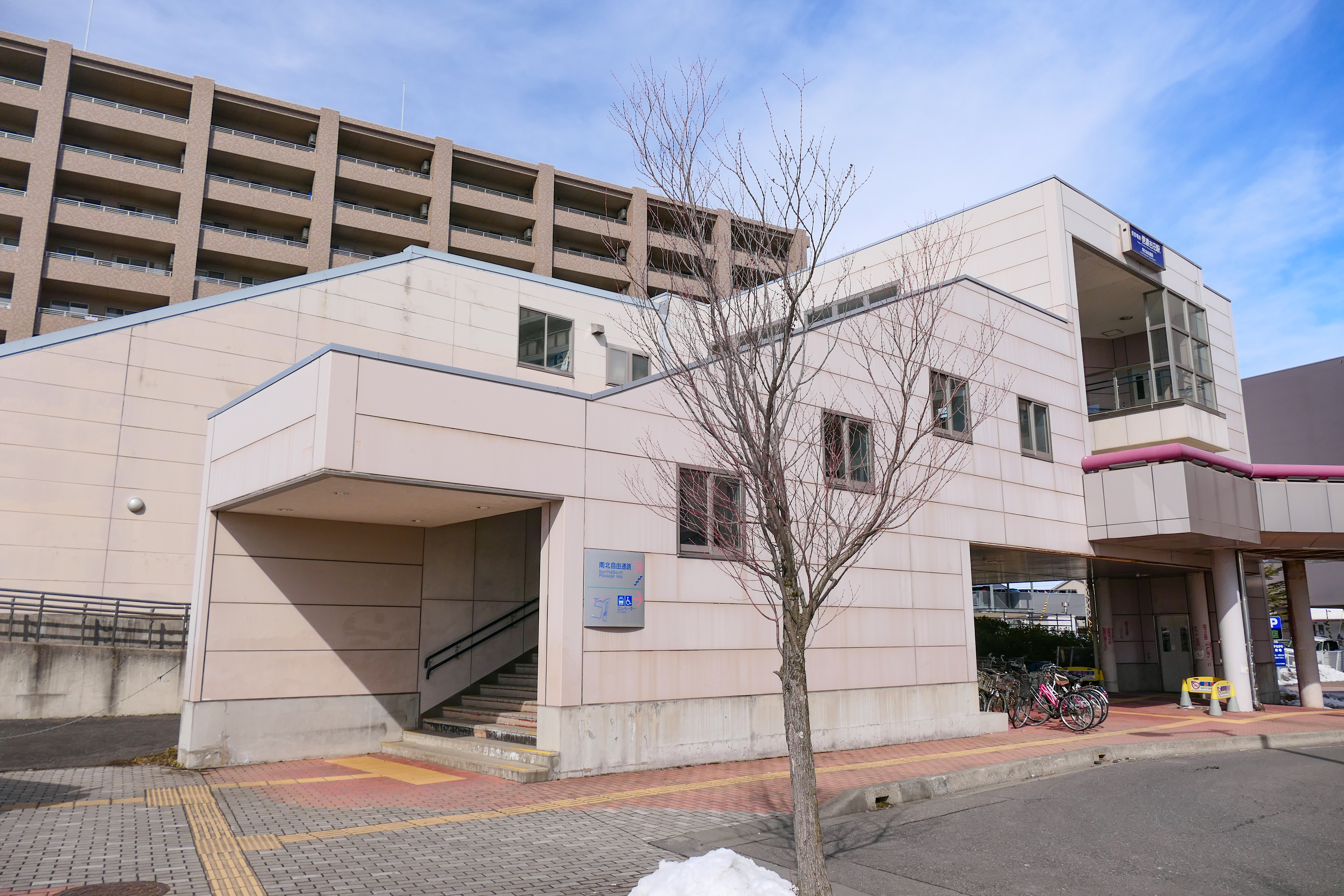
- Shinano-Yoshida Station in February 2022

General information
- Location: 3-9-13 Yoshida-chō, Nagano-shi, Nagano-ken 381-0043; Japan
- Coordinates: 36°40′2.8″N 138°13′15.5″E
- Operator: Nagano Electric Railway
- Line: ■ Nagano Electric Railway Nagano Line
- Distance: 4.3 km from Nagano
- Platforms: 1 island platform
- Tracks: 2

Other information
- Station code: N7
- Website: Official website

History
- Opened: 28 June 1926

Passengers
- FY2016: 1492 daily
Location
- Location within Japan

Shinano-Yoshida Station (信濃吉田駅, Shinano-Yoshida-eki) is a railway station in the city of Nagano, Japan, operated by the private railway operating company Nagano Electric Railway.

== Lines ==
Shinano-Yoshida Station is a station on the Nagano Electric Railway Nagano Line and is 4.3 kilometers from the terminus of the line at Nagano Station.

== Station layout ==
The station consists of two opposed side platforms serving two tracks, with an elevated station building. The station is staffed.

=== Platforms ===
1	■ Nagano Electric Railway Nagano Line	for Suzaka, Shinshū-Nakano and Yudanaka
2	■ Nagano Electric Railway Nagano Line	for Gondō and Nagano

== Adjacent stations ==
«	Service	»
Nagano Electric Railway
Express-A: Does not stop at this station
Hongō	Express-B	Asahi
Kirihara	Local	Asahi

== History ==
The station opened on 28 June 1926 as Yoshidachō Station (吉田町駅). It was renamed to its present name on 5 October of the same year.

== Passenger statistics ==
In fiscal 2016, the station was used by an average of 1492 passengers daily (boarding passengers only).

== Surrounding area ==
- Yoshida Elementary School
- Nagano Higashi Middle School
- Nagano Yoshida High School

== See also ==
- List of railway stations in Japan
