= Pavel Shcheglovsky =

Russian bobsledder

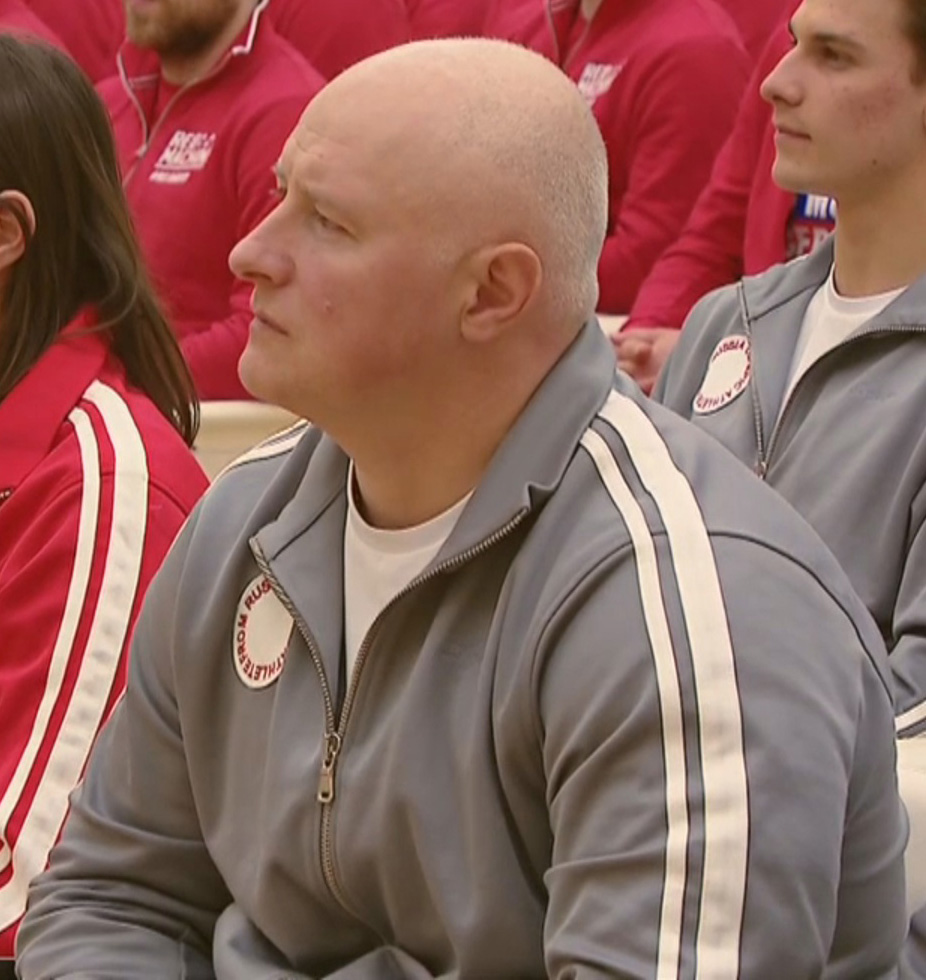
- Shcheglovsky in 2018

Personal information
- Nationality: Russian
- Born: 9 September 1972 (age 52); Moscow, Russia

Sport
- Sport: Bobsleigh

Pavel Shcheglovsky (born 9 September 1972) is a Russian bobsledder. He competed in the two man and the four man events at the 1998 Winter Olympics.
