= Grigory Menshenin =

Russian cross-country skier

Personal information
- Nationality: Russian
- Born: 8 March 1969 (age 56)

Sport
- Sport: Cross-country skiing

Grigory Menshenin (born 8 March 1969) is a Russian cross-country skier. He competed in the men's 50 kilometre freestyle event at the 1998 Winter Olympics.
