= Big Hat =

Sports venue in Nagano, Japan

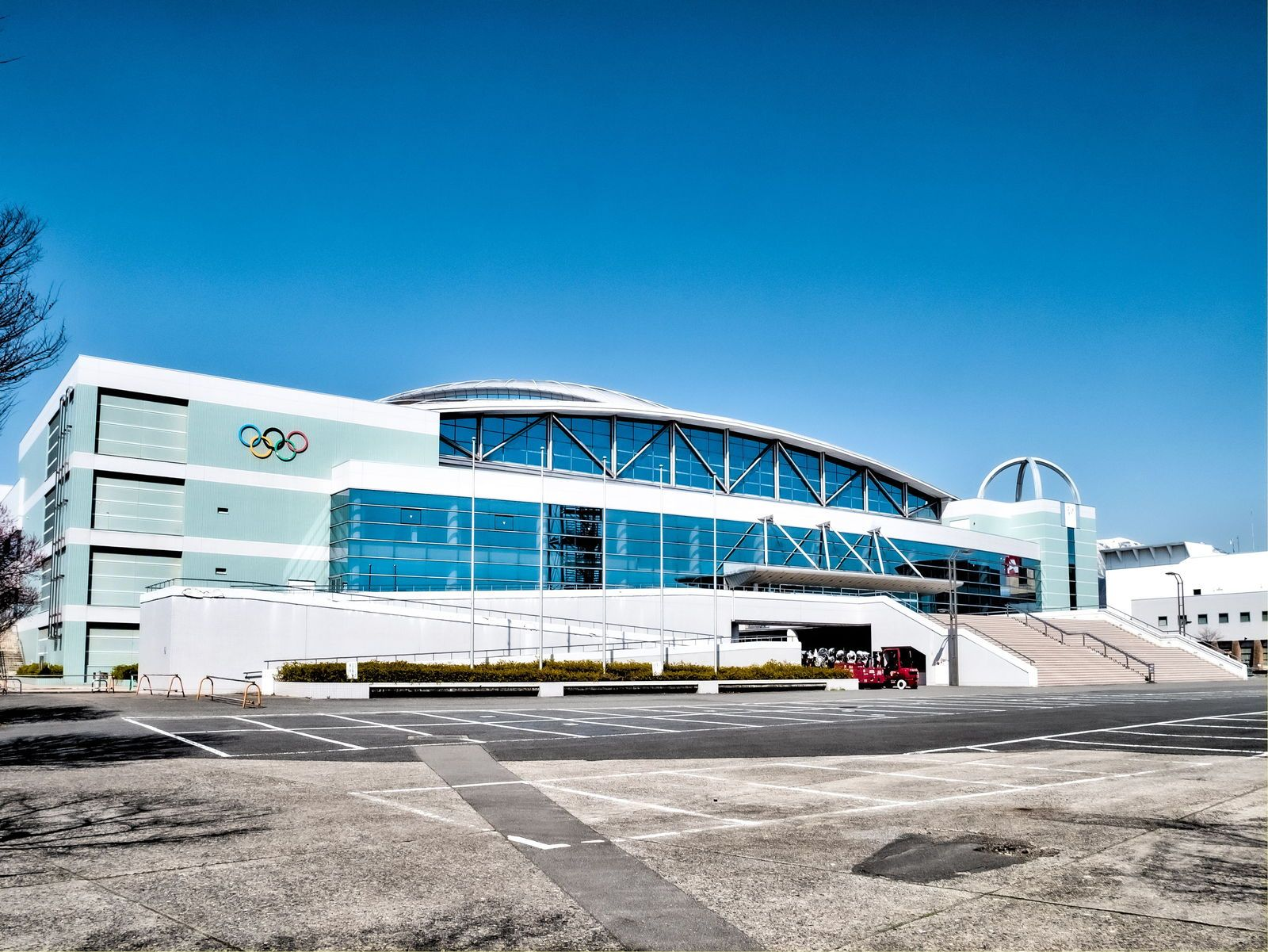
- Interactive map of Big Hat
- Full name: Nagano Wakasato Tamokuteki Sports Arena
- Location: Nagano, Japan
- Coordinates: 36°37′47″N 138°11′45″E
- Owner: Nagano City
- Operator: M-Wave Co.
- Capacity: 10,104

Construction
- Opened: 10 December 1995

The Big Hat (ビッグハット, Biggu Hatto) is an indoor ice hockey arena in Nagano, Japan with a capacity of 10,104 seated spectators. Its official name is the Nagano Wakasato Tamokuteki Sports Arena. The arena was completed and officially opened on December 10, 1995.

== Location ==
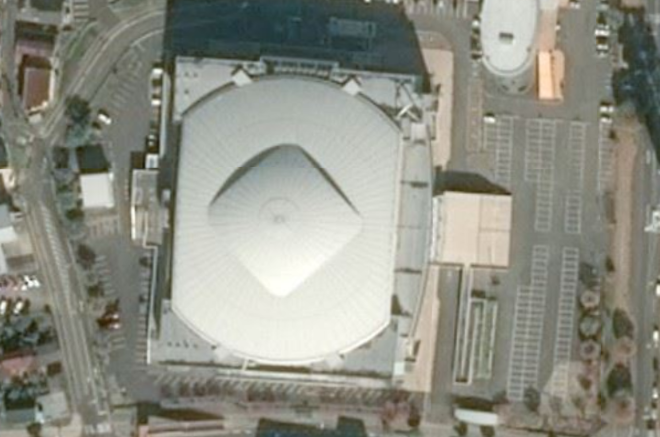
Satellite view

Big Hat is the most central of the venues of the 1998 Winter Olympics that were constructed in the city of Nagano, approximately 2 km south of Nagano Station. White Ring, the venue for the figure skating and short track speed skating is a further 3.5 km south. Nagano Olympic Stadium, where the opening and closing ceremonies were held, is 8 km south of Big Hat. M-Wave, where the long-track speed skating events took place, is 5 km to the east. Finally, Aqua Wing Arena, which was the ice hockey B arena, is 5.3 km to the north of Big Hat.

== Events ==
The ice hockey games from the 1998 Winter Olympics, including the men's and women's finals, were held at this arena. The rink served as the location of the Nagano Cup in 1996, 2000, 2001, 2004, 2007 and last held in 2010. It was an ice hockey tournament held to commemorate the 1998 games, as well as many short track speed skating competitions. The Wakasato hall in the complex features a stage and theater seating, and frequently serves as a venue for music recitals and public meetings.

== Specifications ==
- Building area: 12,050 m^{2}
- Total floor area: 25,240 m^{2}
- Structure: Reinforced concrete, four floors above ground, one basement below
- Capacity: 5,000

== See also ==
- List of indoor arenas in Japan
