= Konstantin Dyomin =

Russian bobsledder

Personal information
- Nationality: Russian
- Born: 3 February 1974 (age 51); Moscow, Russia

Sport
- Sport: Bobsleigh

Konstantin Dyomin (born 3 February 1974) is a Russian bobsledder. He competed in the two man and the four man events at the 1998 Winter Olympics.
