= Andrey Nutrikhin =

Russian cross-country skier

Personal information
- Nationality: Russian
- Born: 20 August 1973 (age 51); Vorkuta, Russia

Sport
- Sport: Cross-country skiing

Andrey Nutrikhin (born 20 August 1973) is a Russian cross-country skier. He competed in the men's 50 kilometre freestyle event at the 1998 Winter Olympics.
