= Nagano Athletic Stadium =

Athletic stadium in Nagano, Japan

Coordinates: 36°39′31″N 138°14′00″E

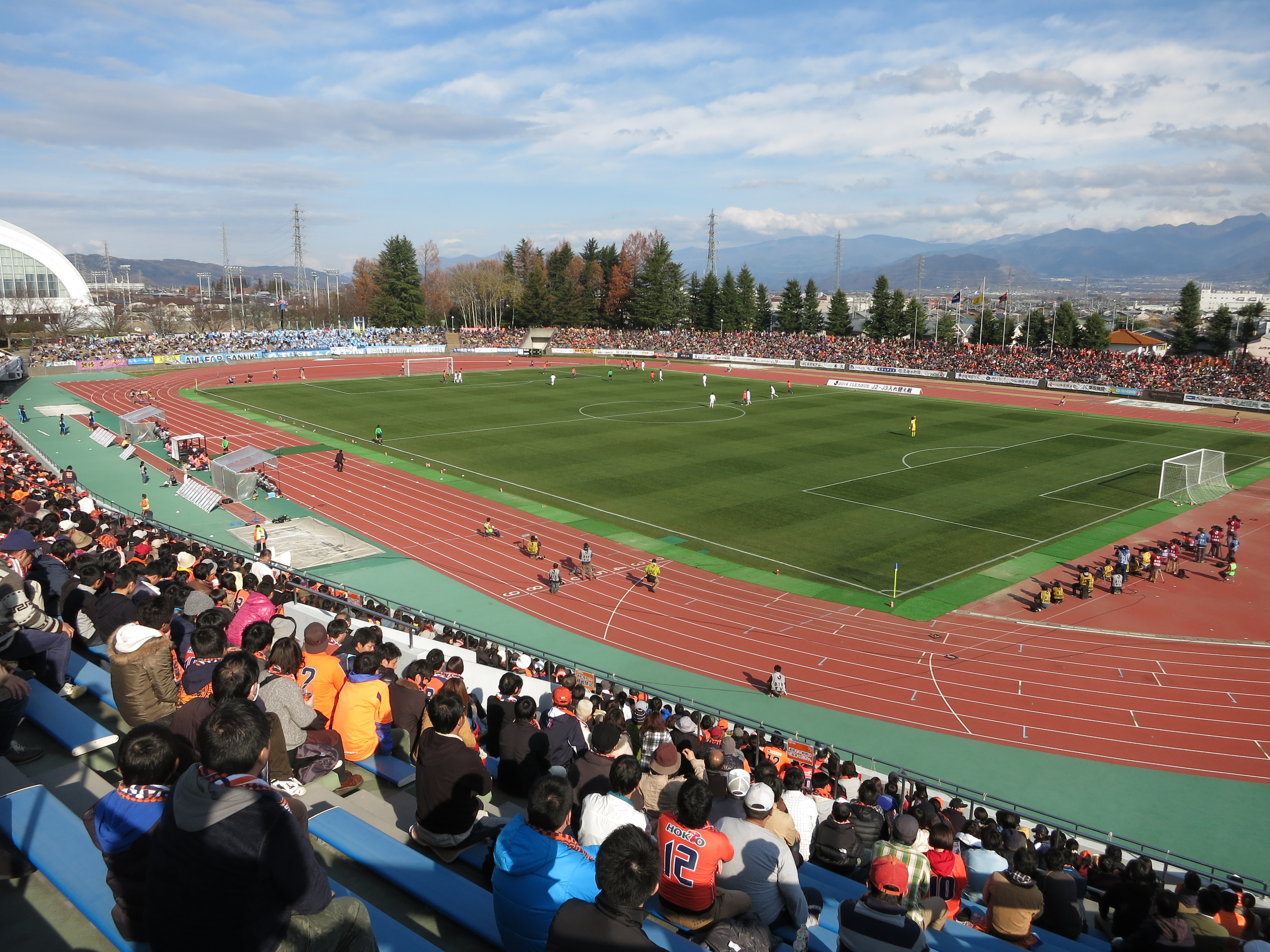
- Interactive map of Nagano Athletic Stadium
- Location: Nagano, Nagano, Japan
- Owner: Nagano City
- Operator: Shinko Sports Co., Ltd.
- Capacity: 17,200
- Surface: grass
- Field size: 106m×70m

Construction
- Opened: 1976

Nagano Athletic Stadium (長野市営陸上競技場) is an athletic stadium in Nagano Sports Park in the Yoshida area of Nagano, Nagano, Japan.

The seating capacity is 5,200 seats, and the grass stand holds 12,000 people.
