= Aqua Wing Arena =

Multi-purpose indoor arena in Nagano, Japan

- 長野運動公園総合運動場総合市民プール"アクアウィング"
- Aqua Wing
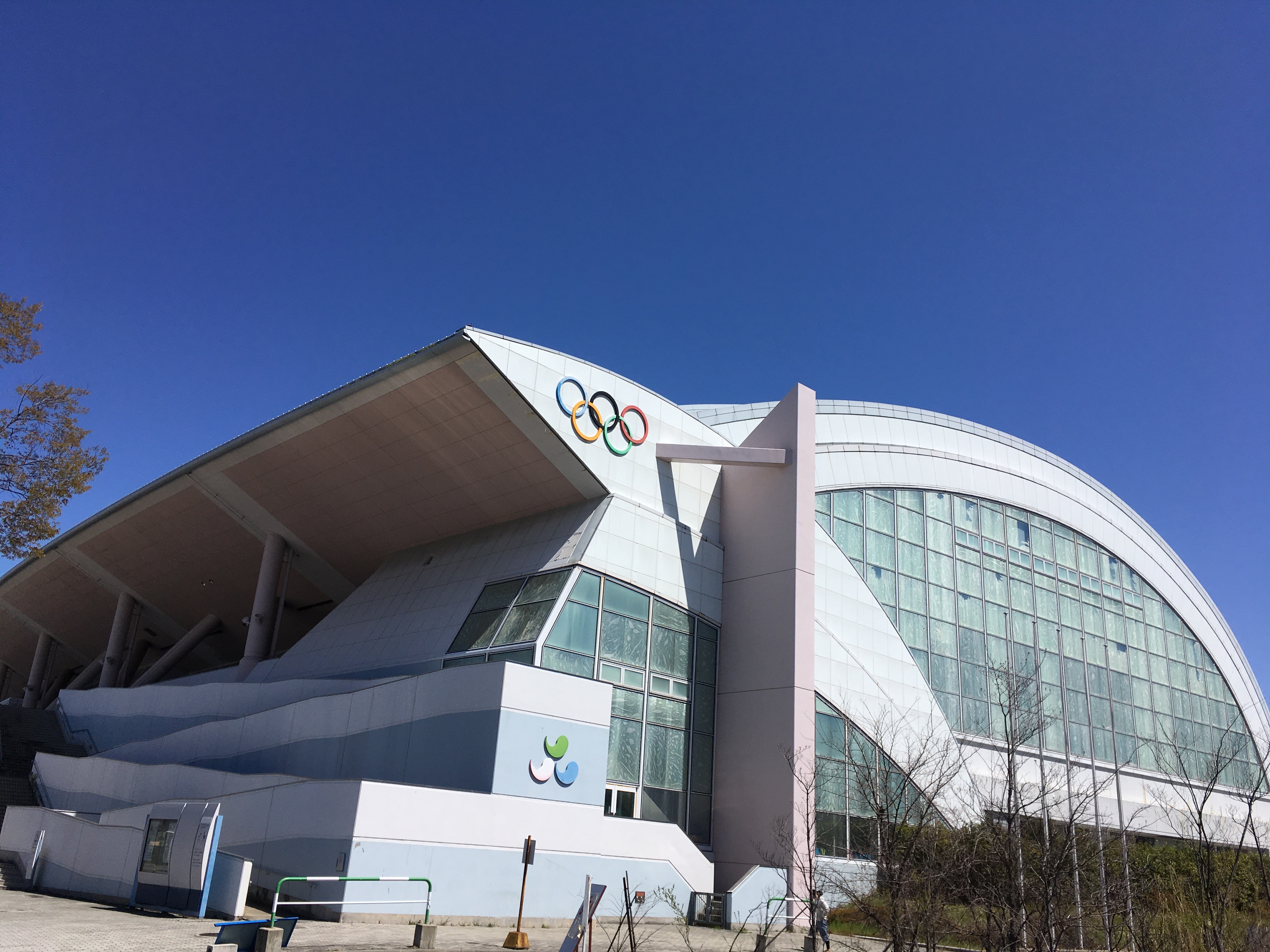
- Aqua Wing Arena in April 2019
- Interactive map of Aqua Wing Arena
- Former names: Aqua Wing Arena
- Location: Nagano, Japan
- Coordinates: 36°39′38″N 138°13′59″E
- Capacity: 6,000 for ice hockey, 2,000 for swimming
- Acreage: 5.2ha

Construction
- Groundbreaking: 12 October 1995
- Opened: September 1997
- Cost: 9.1 billion yen (Note: Hanazawa 1999, p. 185)

Aqua Wing Arena is a retractable roof aquatics arena in Nagano, Japan. The arena is located in the Yoshida area of the city of Nagano, in Nagano Sports Park (長野運動公園, Nagano undou kouen), 5 km northeast of Nagano Station. The closest station is Asahi Station on the Nagano Electric Railway, a distance of 1 km.

The Aqua Wing Arena was constructed as Venue B for the ice hockey events at the 1998 Winter Olympics, and was the last venue to be completed for the Games, in September 1997. Big Hat, the principal Venue A for the ice hockey competition at the 1998 Winter Olympics, is located approximately 5.3 km southwest of Aqua Wing Arena. M-Wave, the site of the speed skating events at the Games is located approximately 2.5 km south of Aqua Wing Arena.

The Aqua Wing Arena was designed to be converted into an aquatics centre, and the retrofit was completed in 1999. The arena consists of a 50-meter pool, a 25-meter swimming pools, and a diving pool. (Note: Hanazawa 1999, p. 223) The roof is retractable. Although the arena sat 6,000 during the 1998 Winter Olympics, the civic pool currently seats 2,000 spectators. The Aqua Wing Arena will be an international pre-training camp for the 2020 Summer Olympics.

== Construction and equipment ==
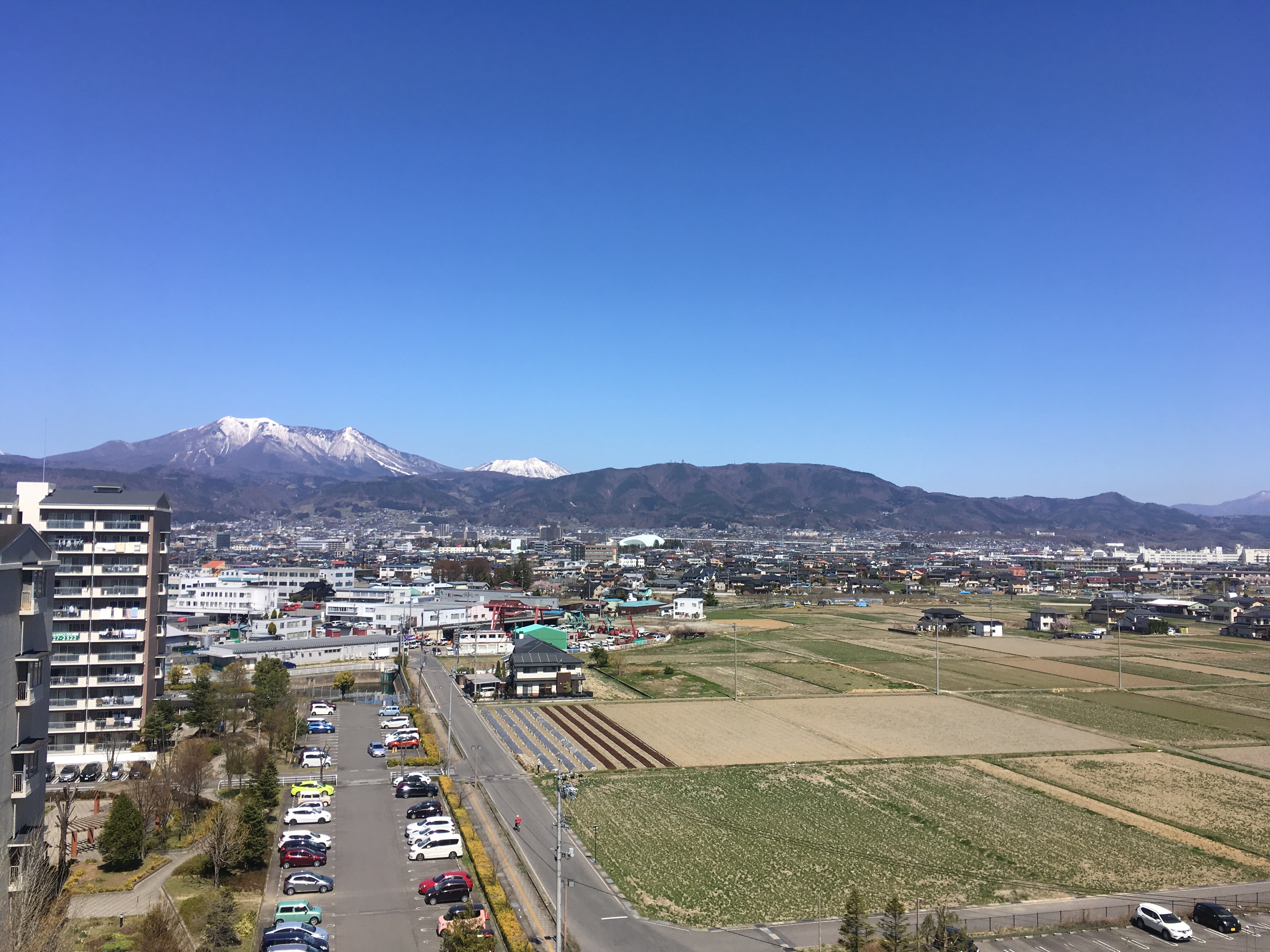
Longview photo of Aqua Wing with Mount Iizuna in the background

The design of Aqua Wing Arena includes sharp flowing lines which represent the wind and water of the region. (Note: Hanazawa 1999, p. 223) Its name, Aqua Wing derives from its similarity to a wing. (Note: Hanazawa 1999, p. 223) Its retractable roof is supported by V-shaped pillars. (Note: Hanazawa 1999, p. 223)

Aqua Wing Arena was built on public land in Nagano Sports Park, as such land costs for the venue were nil; however, construction costs for the arena totaled 9.1 billion yen. (Note: Hanazawa 1999, p. 185) The venue covers an area of approximately 5.2 ha. (Note: Hanazawa 1999, p. 224) The permanent facilities include a building area of approximately 10,100m^{2}, with total floor area of approximately 13,500m^{2}. (Note: Hanazawa 1999, p. 224) The building is made of reinforced concrete and steel frames, with three stories above ground and one below rground. (Note: Hanazawa 1999, p. 224) The maximum height of the building is 31m. (Note: Hanazawa 1999, p. 224) In addition, 16 temporary structures covering 2,390m^{2} and providing 4,690m^{2} of floor space were built. (Note: Hanazawa 1999, p. 224)

To build the ice for Aqua Wing Arena, a temporary rink was situated on top of the 50-meter pool and diving pool, with indirect ammonia refrigeration. (Note: Hanazawa 1999, p. 223) The ice hockey rink was built to International Ice Hockey Federation standards, 60m x 30m. (Note: Hanazawa 1999, p. 223) Sound dampening measurers were used because the ice hockey rink was built atop an empty space. (Note: Hanazawa 1999, p. 223) The 25-meter pool was used for the sub press center. (Note: Hanazawa 1999, p. 223) Aqua Wing Arena was the only venue at the 1998 Winter Olympics that did not stage international competitions before the Games. (Note: Hanazawa 1999, p. 223) In lieu of international competitions, several Japan Ice Hockey League matches were held which permitted staff and volunteers to practice procedures. (Note: Hanazawa 1999, p. 223)

Electricity for the Aqua Wing Arena during the games was generated by gas engines, and heat generated by the engines and freezing equipment was used as energy for the heating system. (Note: Hanazawa 1999, p. 224) This system resulted in capturing 80% of the heat generated by the engines and freezing equipment. (Note: Hanazawa 1999, p. 224) This system is used to heat the swimming pool. (Note: Hanazawa 1999, p. 224)

== Ice hockey at the Winter Olympics at Aqua Wing Arena ==
During the 1998 Winter Olympics, Aqua Wing Arena hosted a total of 15 games for the women's tournament (Note: Hanazawa 1999, p. 223) and eight games for the men's tournament at the Winter Olympics, including two quarterfinal matches. The arena hosted 113,412 spectators over 10 days. (Note: Hanazawa 1999, p. 183) Only Big Hat (256,306), Hakuba Ski Jumping Stadium (179,185), and M-Wave (118,555) hosted more spectators. (Note: Hanazawa 1999, p. 183)

=== Women's tournament ===
1998 was the first year that women competed in Olympic hockey. (The Women's Tournament was won by United States.) Except for the bronze medal match and gold medal match which were held at Big Hat, all games of the women's tournament were played at Aqua Wing Arena. The table below displays the matches held at the Aqua Wing Arena. All times are local (UTC+9).

Date	Time	Teams	Attendance
8 February	12:00	Finland (6) - Sweden(0)	2,208
8 February	16:00	Canada (13) - Japan (0)	4,597
8 February	20:00	China (0) - United States (5)	3,255
9 February	12:00	Finland (11) - Japan (1)	4,972
9 February	16:00	Sweden (1) - United States (7)	3,607
9 February	20:00	Canada (2) - China (0)	2,713
11 February	12:00	Canada (5) - Sweden (3)	5,429
11 February	16:00	China (6) - Japan (1)	5,863
11 February	20:00	Finland (2) - United States 4	3,688
12 February	12:00	China (3) - Sweden (1)	3,670
12 February	16:00	Japan (0) - United States (10)	5,015
12 February	20:00	Canada (4) - Finland (2)	3,133
14 February	12:00	Japan (0) - Sweden (5)	6,009
14 February	16:00	China (1) - Finland (6)	5,638
14 February	20:00	Canada (4) - United States (7)	5,872

=== Men's tournament ===
1998 was the first year that professional athletes from the North American National Hockey League competed in Olympic hockey. (The men's Tournament was won by Czech Republic.) Most games in the men's tournament were held at Big Hat. The table below displays the matches held at the Aqua Wing Arena.

All times are local (UTC+9).

Date	Time	Teams	Round	Attendance
7 February	16:00	Austria (2) - Slovakia(2)	Preliminary	4,315
7 February	20:00	Belarus (4) - France (0)	Preliminary	3,419
10 February	14:00	Kazakhstan (4) - Slovakia(3)	Preliminary	3,659
10 February	14:00	France (0) - Germany (2)	Preliminary	3,659
16 February	14:45	Finland (8) - Kazakhstan (2)	Final	5,544
16 February	18:45	Belarus (2) - Sweden (5)	Final	5,544
18 February	14:45	Belarus (1) - Russia (4)	Quarter-finals	4,628
18 February	18:45	Finland (2) - Sweden (1)	Quarter-finals	5,044

== Public transportation ==
- Asahi Station on the Nagano Electric Railway is approximately 15 minutes away by foot
- Kita-Nagano Station on the Shinano Railway is approximately 15 minutes away by foot
- Bus No.7 leaves from Nagano Station, passengers disembark at Undou kouen or Undou kouen higashi
