= Togakushi =

Togakushi can refer to:

- Mount Togakushi, a stratovolcano in Japan
- Togakushi, Nagano, a village in Japan
- Togakushi Shrine, a shrine in Togakushi, Nagano
