= Myōkō-Togakushi Renzan National Park =

National Park in Chūbu, Japan

- 妙高戸隠連山国立公園
- IUCN category II (national park)
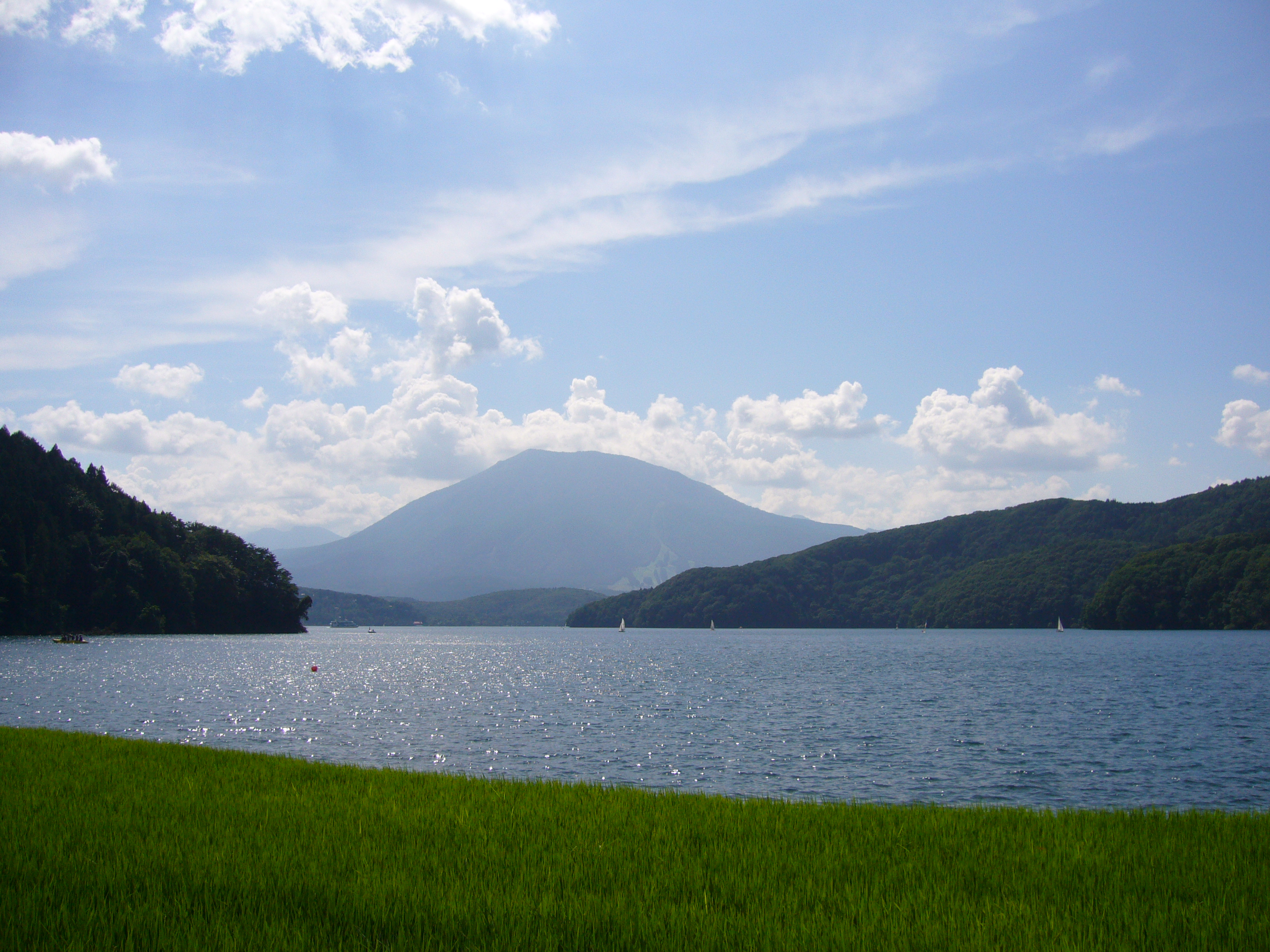
- Lake Nojiri

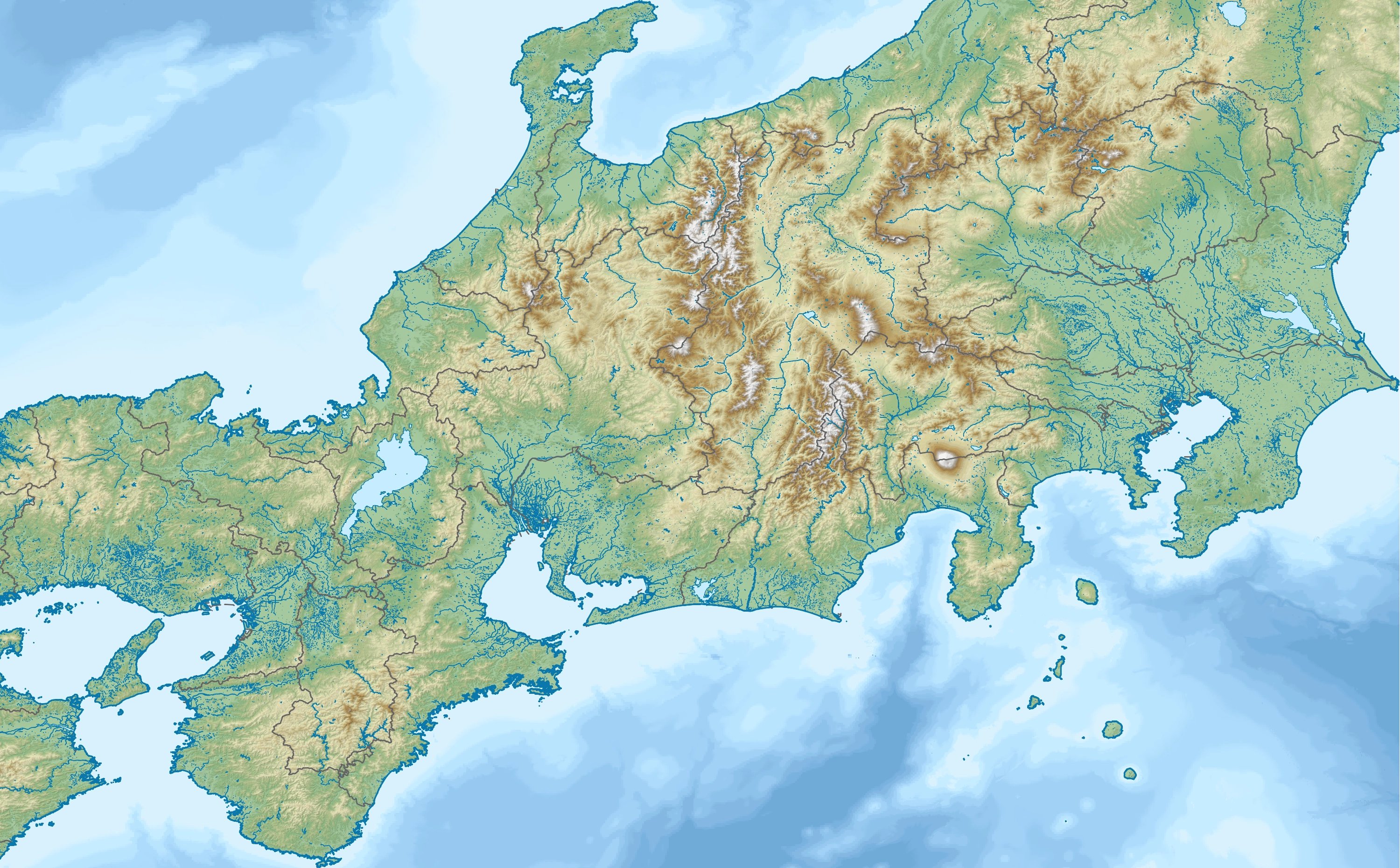
- Location within Central Japan Location within Japan
- Location: Niigata Prefecture and Nagano Prefecture, Japan
- Coordinates: 36°53′29″N 138°06′49″E
- Area: 397.72 km^{2} (153.56 sq mi)
- Established: 27 March 2015
- Governing body: Ministry of the Environment (Japan)

Myōkō-Togakushi Renzan National Park (妙高戸隠連山国立公園, Myōkō-Togakushi Renzan Kokuritsu Kōen) is a national park in Niigata Prefecture and Nagano Prefecture, Japan. Established in 2015, and formerly part of Jōshin'etsu-kōgen National Park, the park comprises an area of 39,772 ha (98,280 acres) in the municipalities of Itoigawa and Myōkō in Niigata Prefecture and Iizuna, Nagano, Otari, and Shinano in Nagano Prefecture.

Prominent mountains of the park include Mount Hiuchi (2,462m), Mount Myōkō (2,454m), Niigata-Yakeyama (2,400m,), Mount Takatsuma (2,353m), Mount Kurohime (2,054m), Mount Iizuna (1,917m), and Mount Togakushi (1,904m). Of these, Mount Yakeyama remains active an active volcano. Other features include Lake Nojiri and Lake Reisenji.

== See also ==
- List of national parks of Japan
- Chūbu region
- Togakushi Shrine
- Five Mountains of Northern Nagano Prefecture

== Gallery ==
Scenes from the Myōkō-Togakushi Renzan National Park
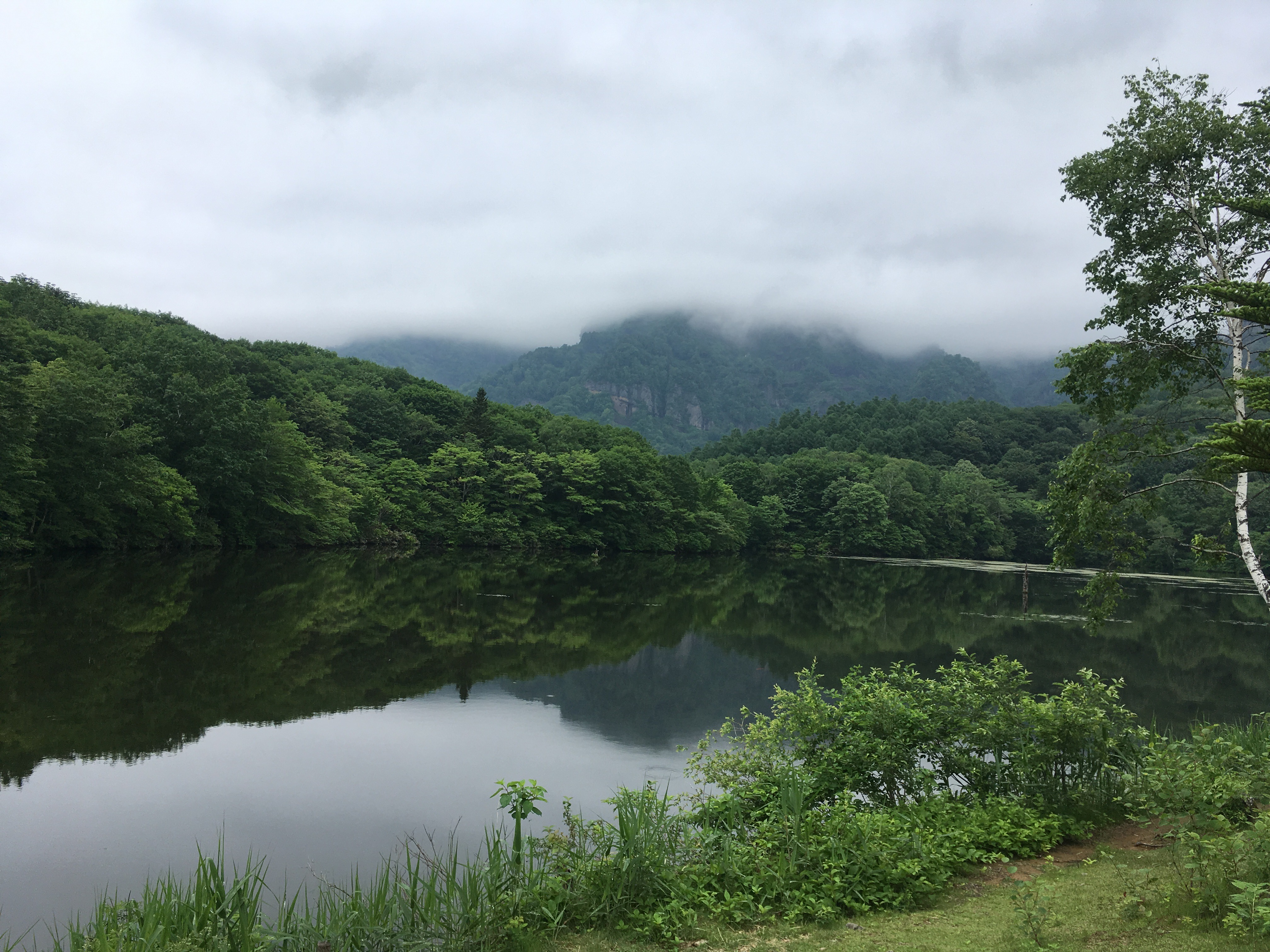
Kagami-ike Pond, in Togakushi, Nagano 2019.

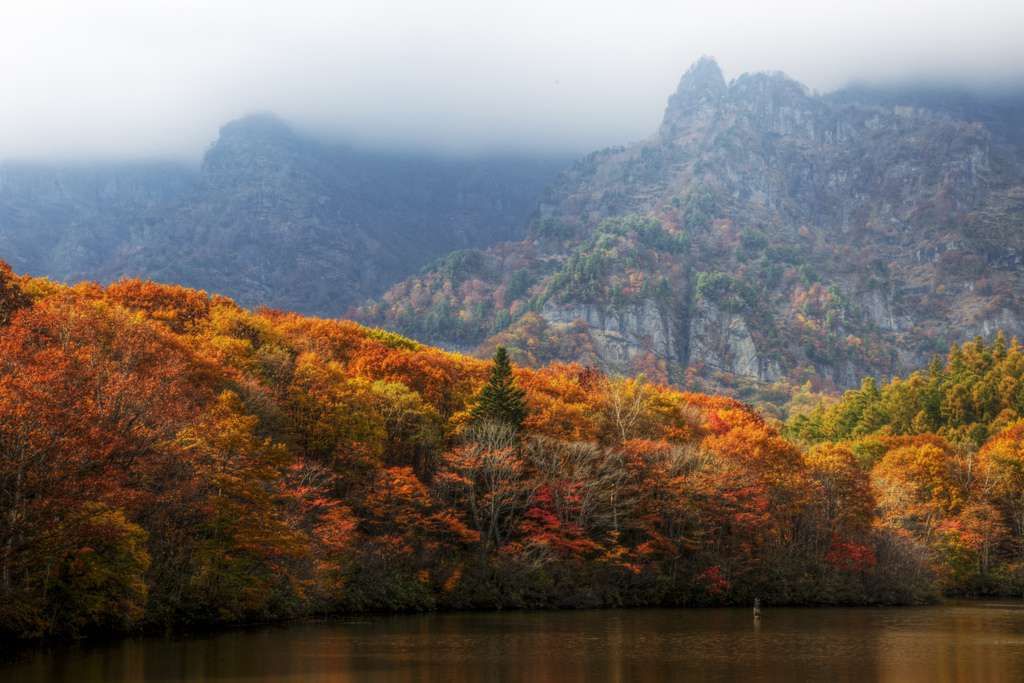
Kagamiike-pond

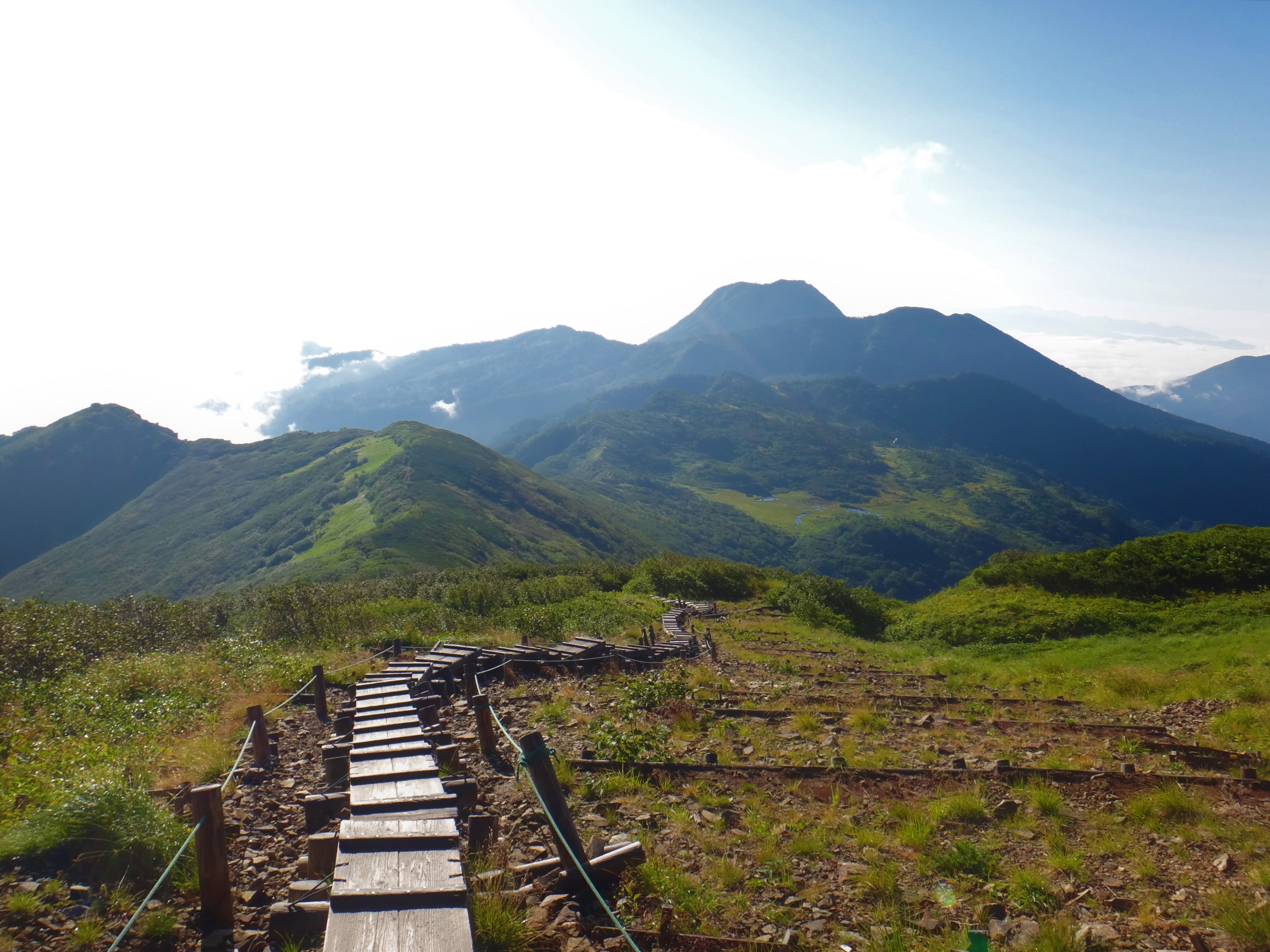
Mount Hiuchi

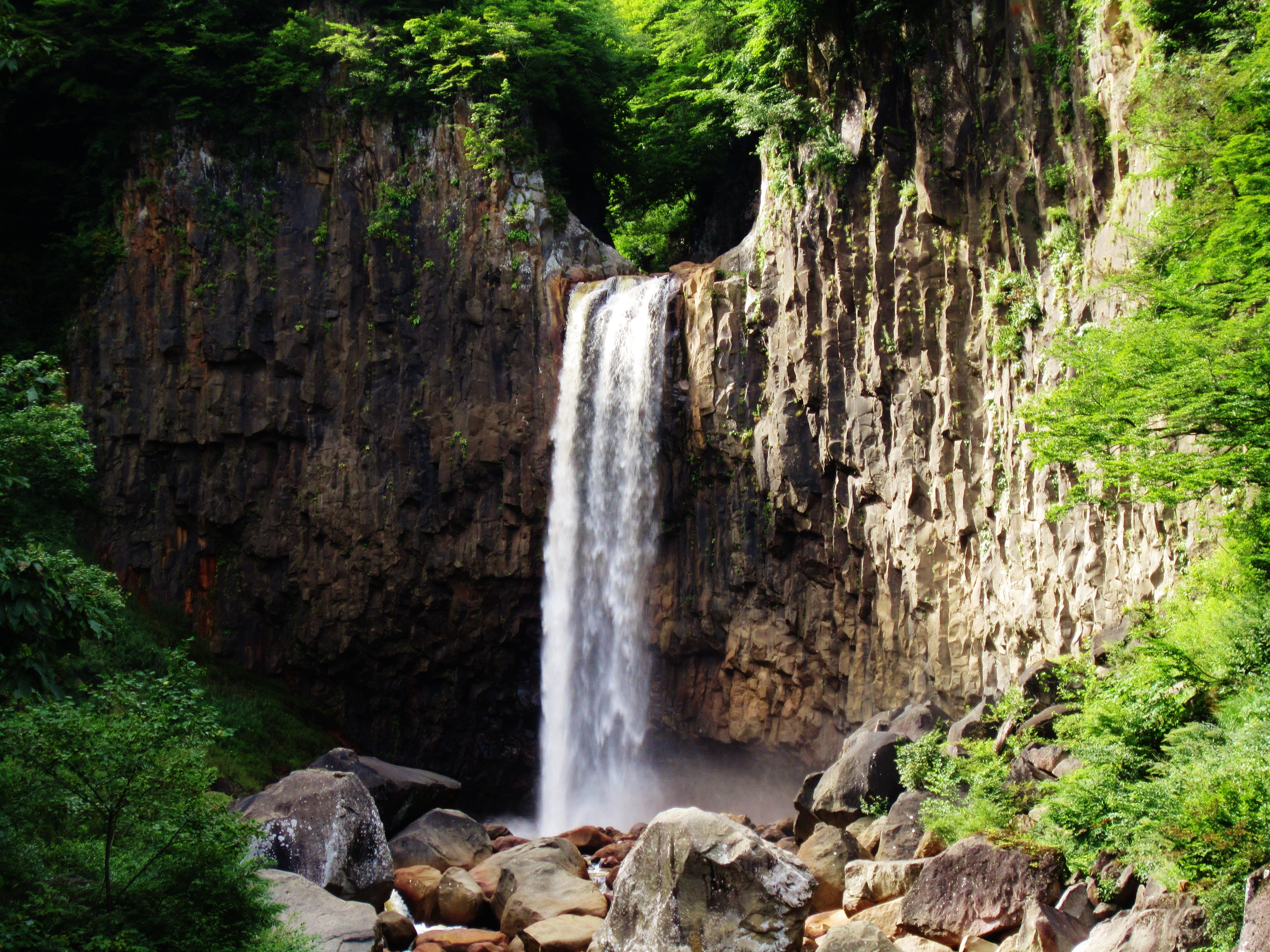
Naena Falls

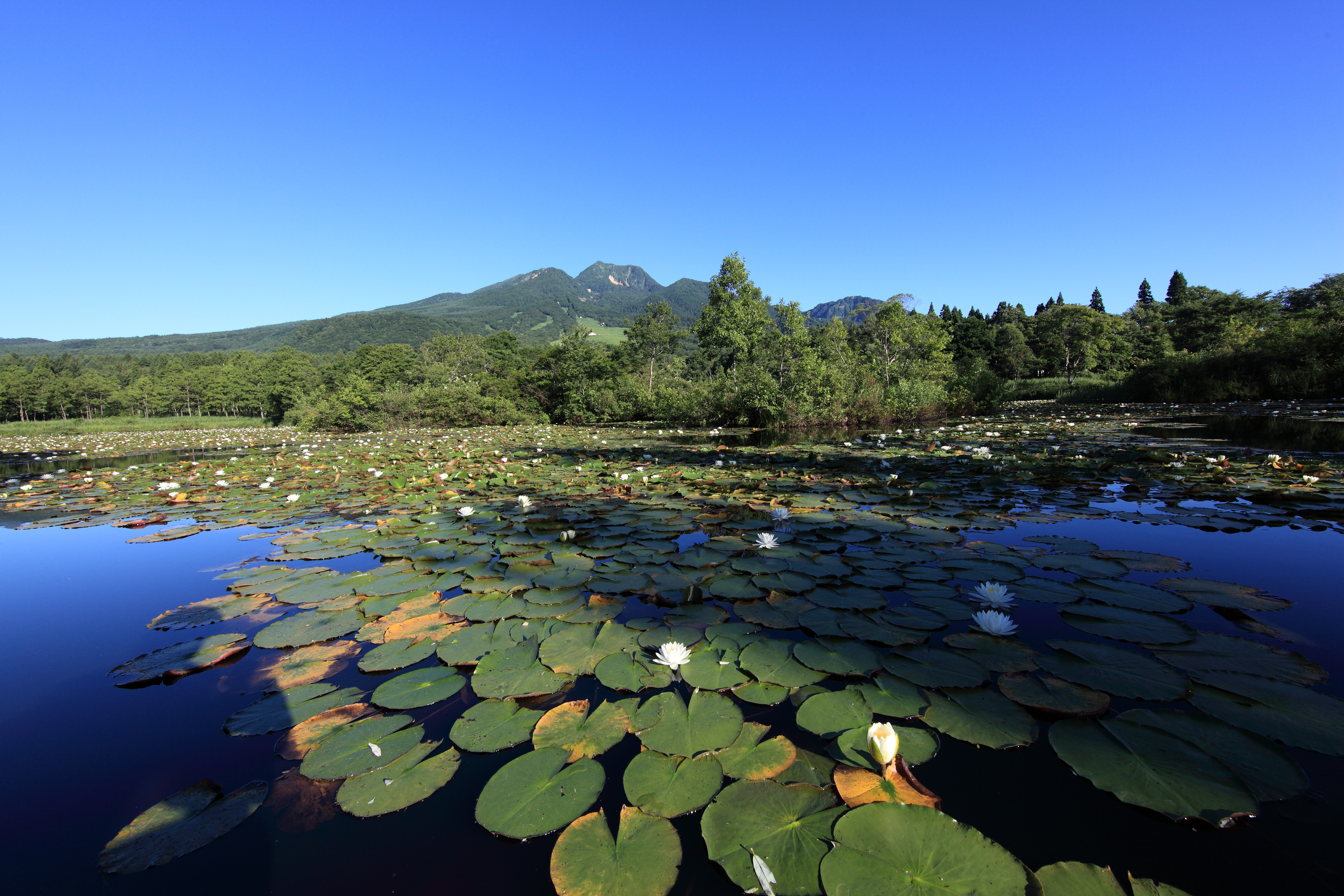
Mount Myoko
