= Mount Iizuna =

Stratovolcano on the island of Honshu in Japan

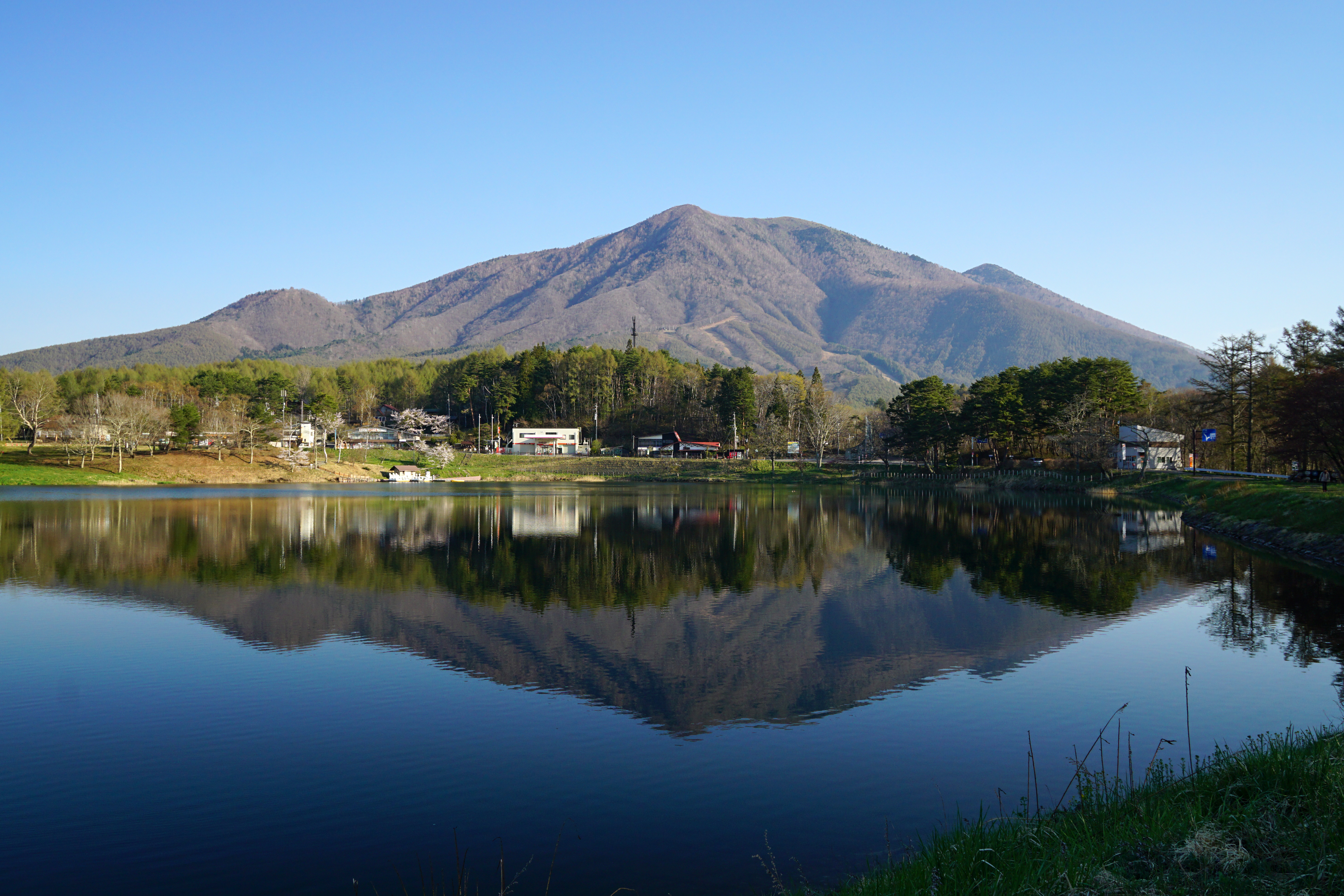
- A view from Daizahoushi Pond on the way from Nagano City to Togakushi Village. Mount Reisenji on the right and Mount Menō on the left.

Highest point
- Elevation: 1,917 m (6,289 ft)
- Prominence: 696 m (2,283 ft)
- Listing: 200 Famous Japanese Mountains
- Coordinates: 36°44′22″N 138°8′1″E

Naming
- Native name: 飯縄山 (Japanese)
- English translation: mountain of edible sand

Geography
- Location within Japan
- Location: Nagano, Japan

Geology
- Mountain type: Stratovolcano

Mount Iizuna (飯縄山, Iizuna-yama), also written as 飯綱山 (Iizuna-yama), is a stratovolcano located ten kilometers north-northwest of the heart of Nagano, Nagano Prefecture, Japan. The mountain straddles the city of Nagano and Iizuna town in Kamiminochi District, Nagano. Together with Mount Reisenji (霊仙寺山, Resenji-yama) 1875.0 m, Mount Menō (瑪瑙山, Menō-yama) 1748 m, and others, it forms the Iizuna range. It has an elevation of 1,917 metres.

Mount Iizuna is located within Myōkō-Togakushi Renzan National Park, and is one of the "Five Mountains of Northern Shinshu" (北信五岳) that also includes Mount Myōkō, Mount Kurohime, Mount Togakushi, and Mount Madarao. The mountain is one of the 200 most famous mountains in Japan (日本二百名山 Nihon 200 meizan), and one of the 100 most famous mountains in Nagano (信州百名山).

This mountain is a sacred site for mountain-based religious sects such as Shugendo, and said to be the home of a tengu named Saburō. According to legend, there was once a strange, edible sand somewhere on the mountain, which the tengu would distribute in times of poor harvest. At the entrances of the hiking trails, there are several torii and komainu, the South Trail includes 13 stone Buddhas, and there is a shrine located near the summit.

== Leisure activities ==
=== Hiking ===
The mountain has popular hiking trails, which can be hiked in all seasons (with appropriate gear in winter), leading to the summit in approximately 2-2.5 hours depending on fitness level. The South Trail (南登山道 Minami tozan do) begins at the Izuna Trailhead Bus Stop (飯縄登山口バス停 Izunatozanguchi basu tei), which is approximately 14 km from Nagano Station and can be reached by car or public bus run by Alpico Kōtsū. Parking is available. The bus stop is in front of Nagano Country Club. From the Izuna Trailhead (1,126m), the trail rises to 1,917m over approximately 4 km of hiking. There are no chains or ladders on the trail, and little technical skill is required. Another popular trail, West Trail (西登山道 Nishi tozan do) leaves from the village of Togakushi, at an elevation of 1,225m. It meets the main South Trail at an elevation of 1,840 m at the South/West trail branch (南・西登山道分岐 Minami nishi tozan-dō bunki).

The summit provides 360° views, including panoramic views of Nagano City, Mount Togakushi, Mount Takatsuma, one of the 100 Famous Japanese Mountains, and Mount Kurohime throughout year; and especially in winter, the Hida Mountains, Yatsugatake Mountains, and Mount Fuji can be seen. Note, however, that specialty gear, including crampons, are required in winter. From the summit, it is also possible to ascend from or descend to Togakushi via Mount Menō (瑪瑙山) (1748m) and Togakushi Ski Field. Another possible descent is via Mount Reisenji (霊仙寺山) (1875m) towards the Reisenji Temple Ruins (零戦時後) and the trailhead, or to the Iizuna Resort (いいずなリゾートスキー場 Iizuna Resort Ski Jo).

=== Skiing ===
The mountain is also a popular area for skiing and is where the bobsleigh and luge track for the 1998 Winter Olympics is located. Freestyle skiing events for these olympics took place at Iizuna Resort (いいずなリゾートスキー場) on the eastern slopes of the mountain in the town of Iizuna. The resort also hosted events during the 2005 Special Olympics World Winter Games.

The ski resort has seven courses, with a top elevation of 1500m, with a vertical of 600m, and a base elevation of 900m. Its longest run is 2500m.

== See also ==
- Five Mountains of Northern Shinshu
- List of mountains in Japan
- List of volcanoes in Japan

== Gallery ==
Mount Iizuna
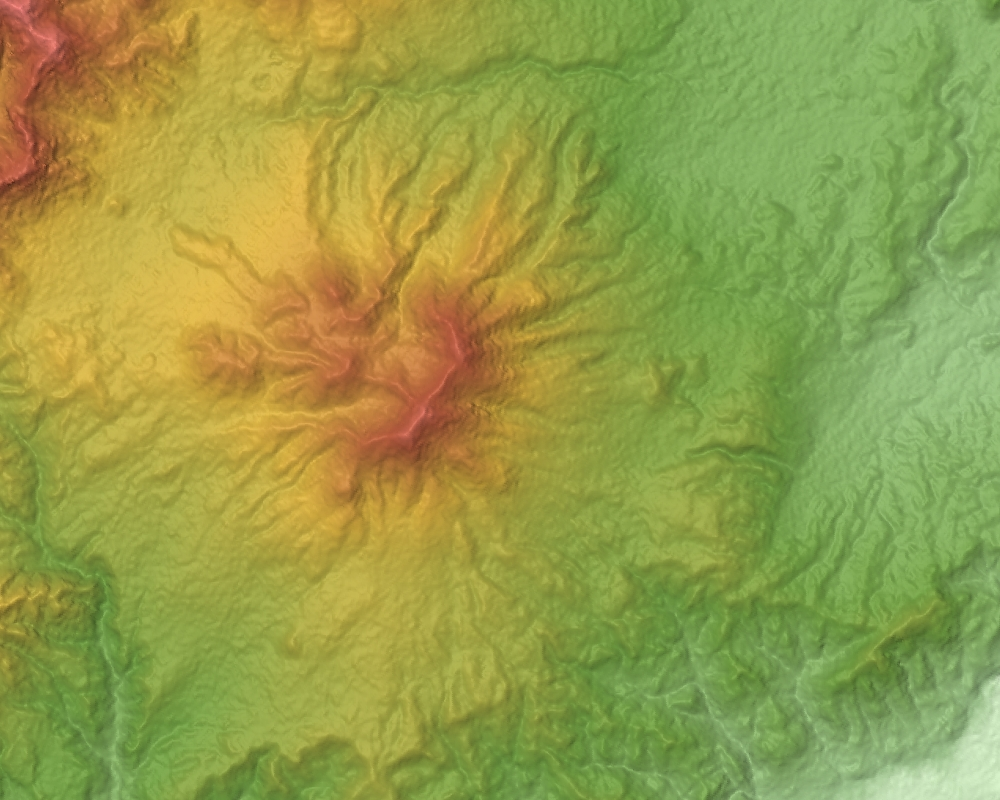
Mount Iizuna Volcano Relief Map

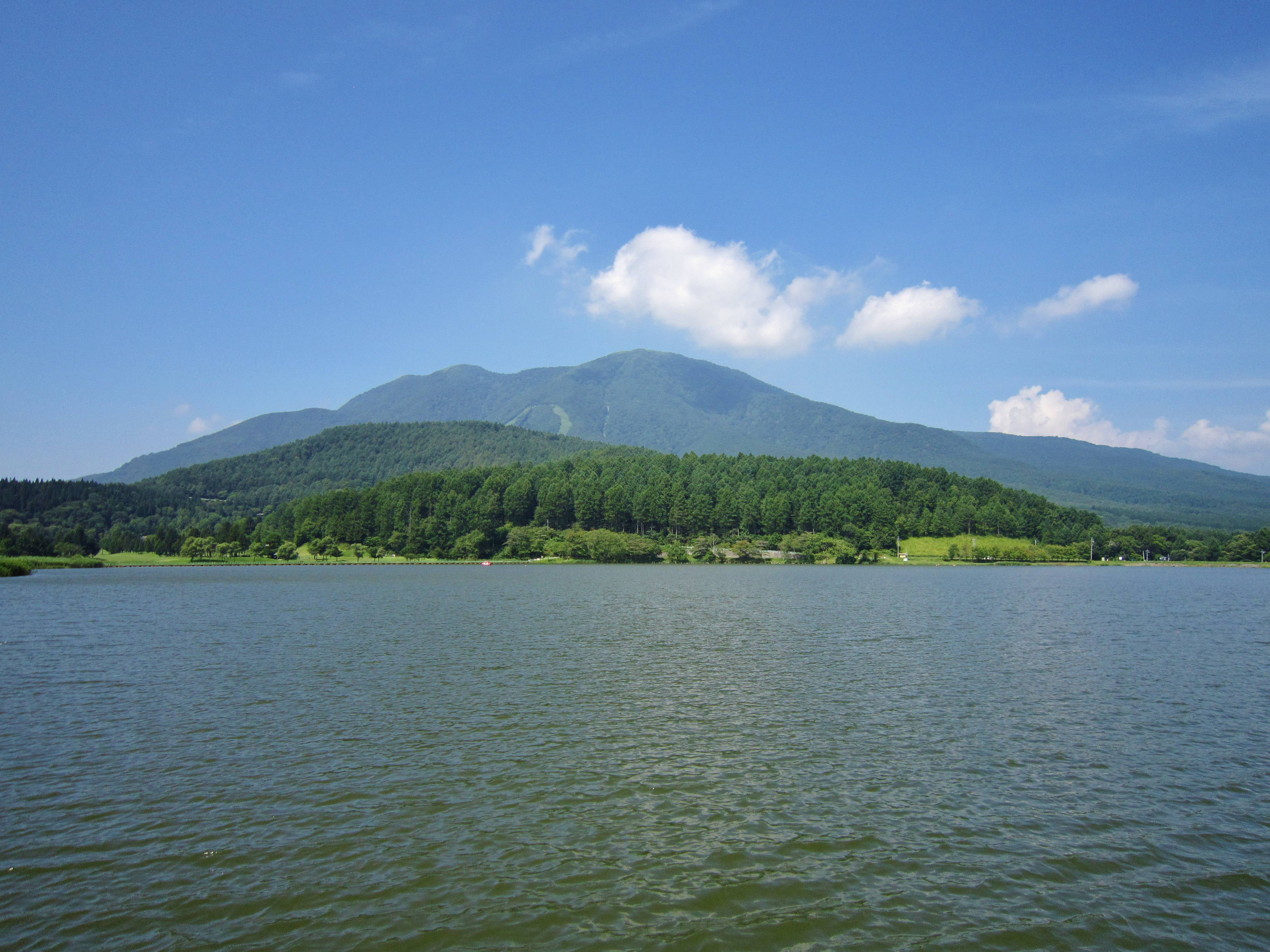
A view from Lake Reisenji. Mt. Reisenji (right), Mt. Iizuna (left).

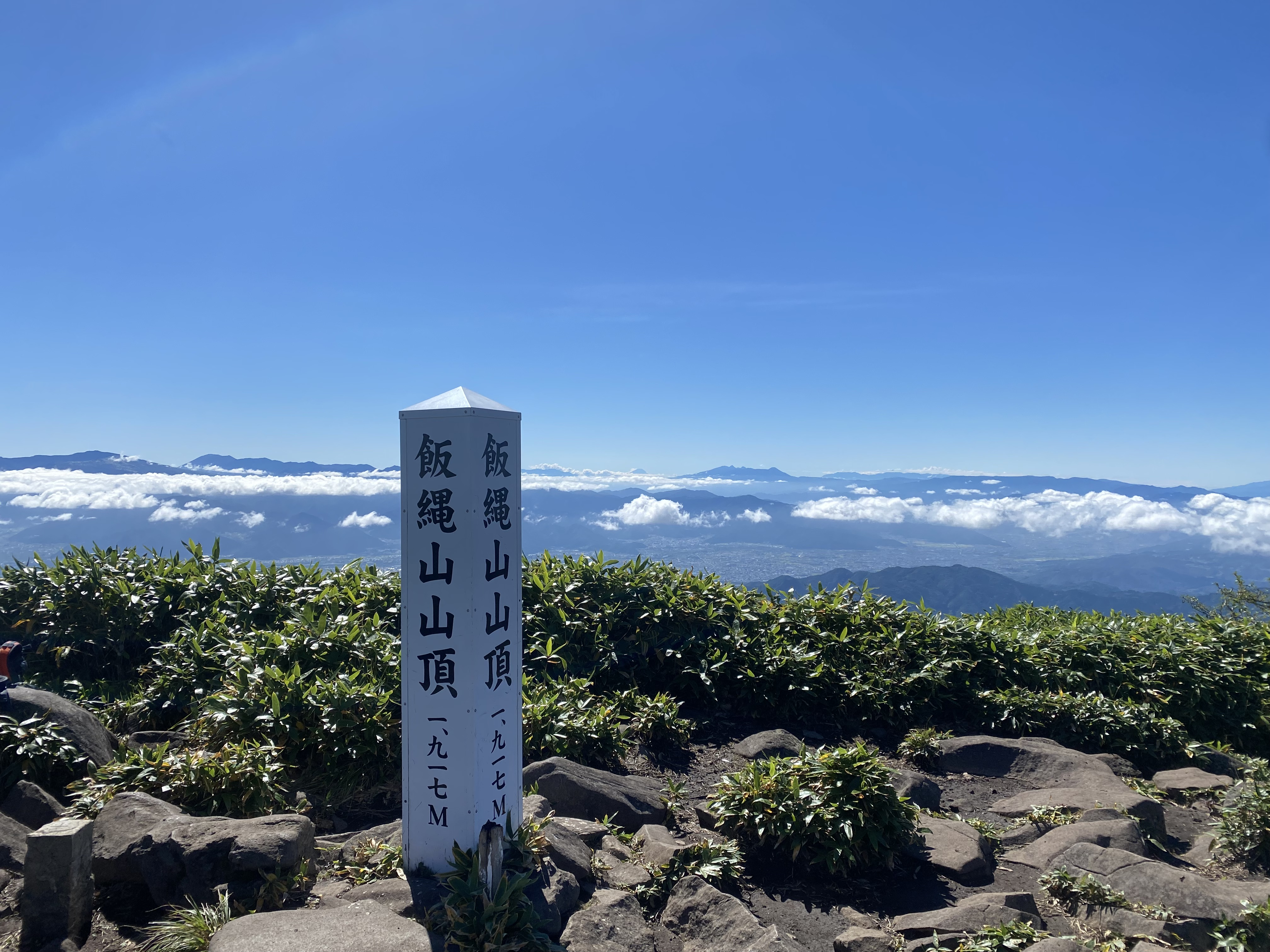
View from Mount Iizuna (with Mount Fuji and Yatsugatake)

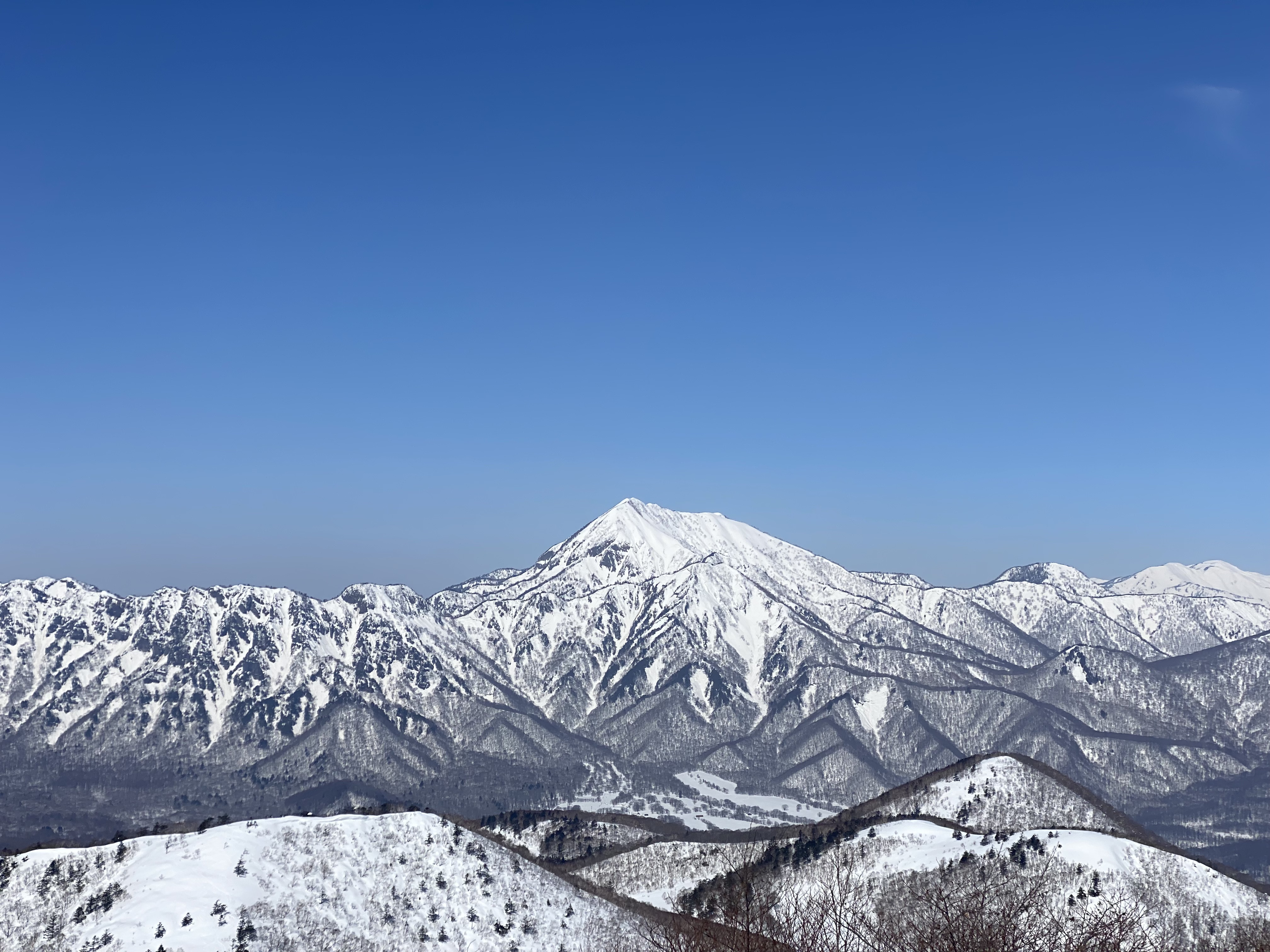
Late winter photo of Mount Takatsuma and the Togakushi Ridge from the summit

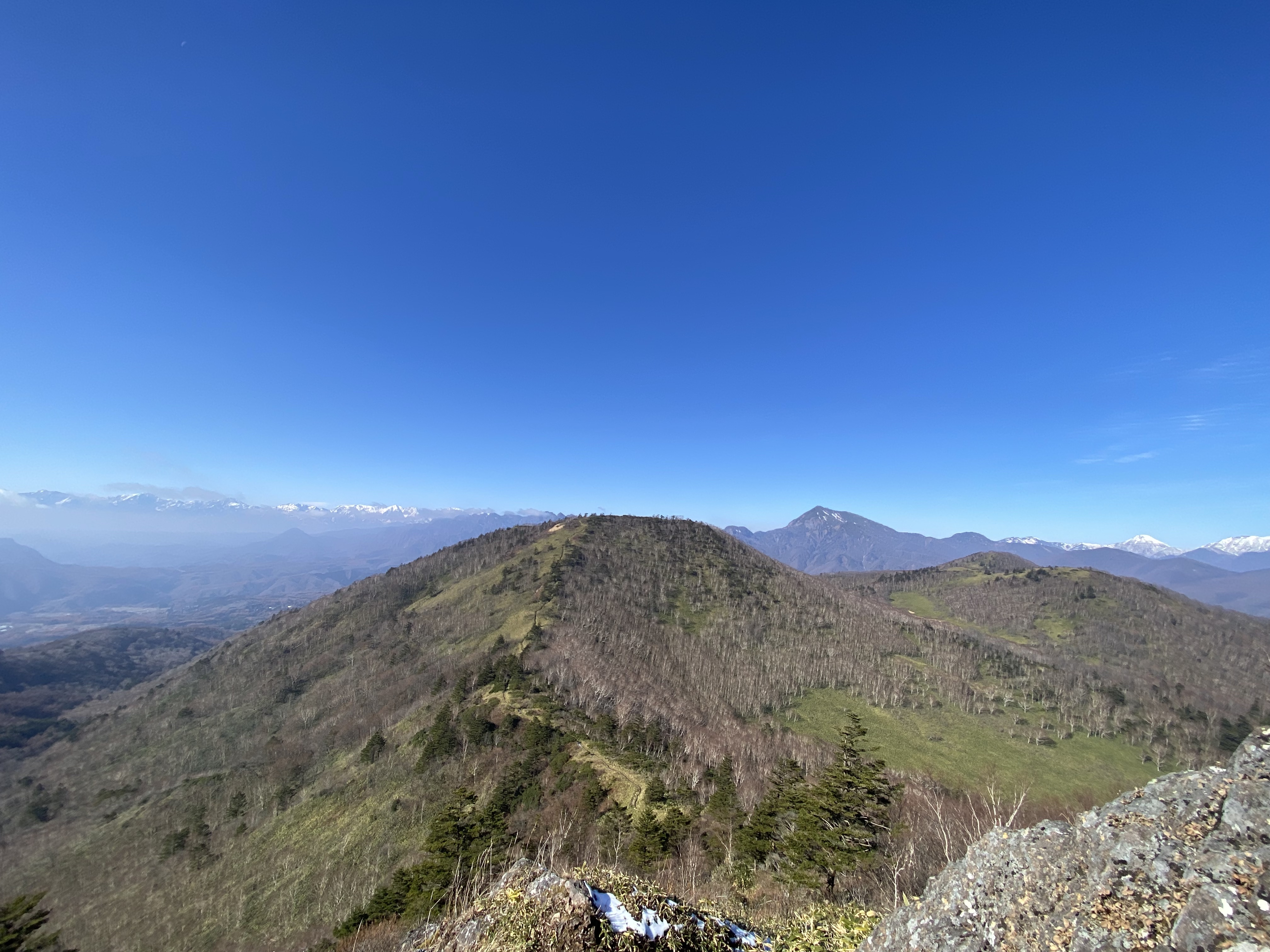
Mt Menou taken from Mt Iizuna (Nov 2022)

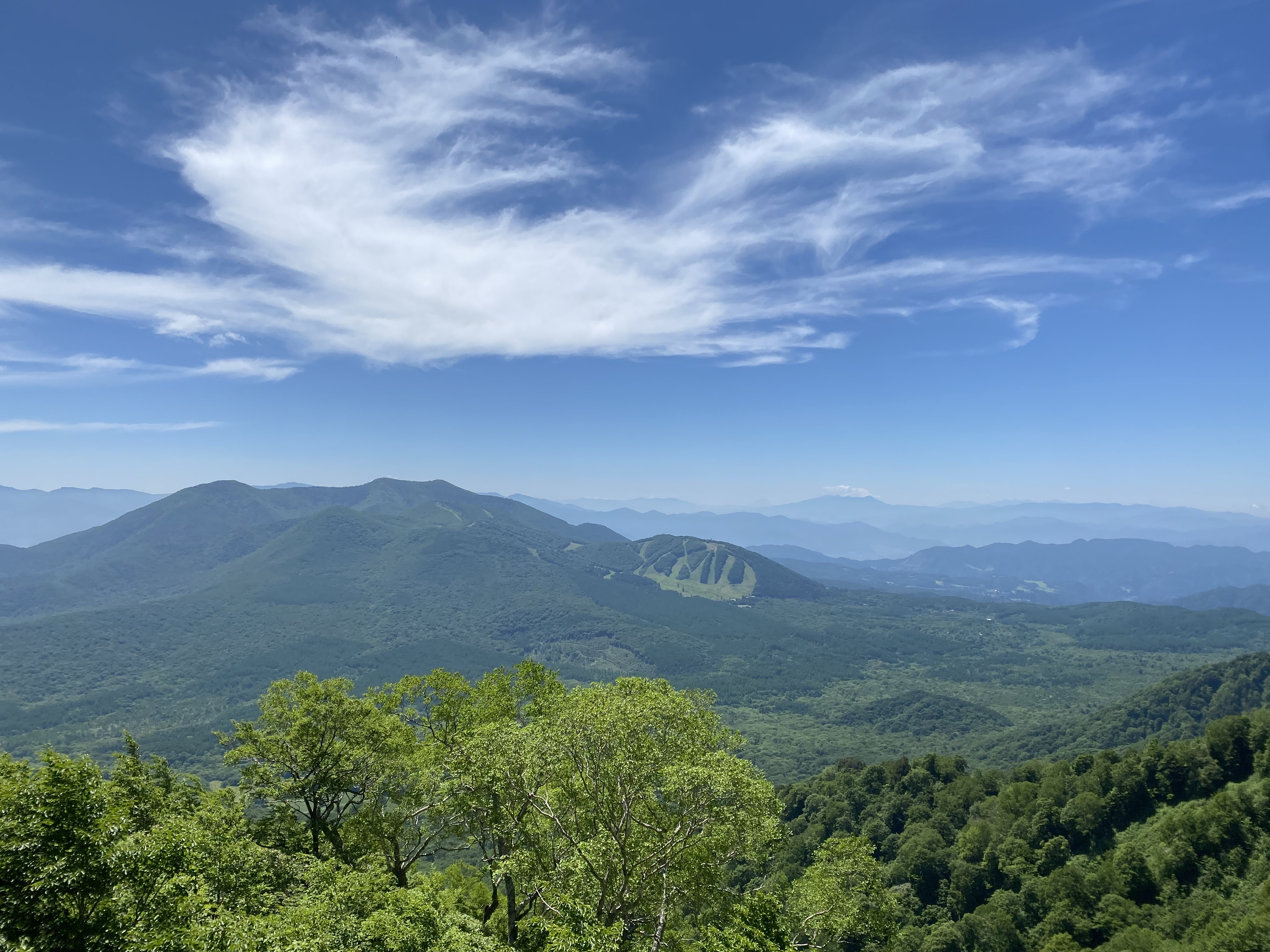
Mt Iizuna with Mount Reisenji (left), Mount Menou (front centre), and Togakushi Ski Field (right) (June 2023)

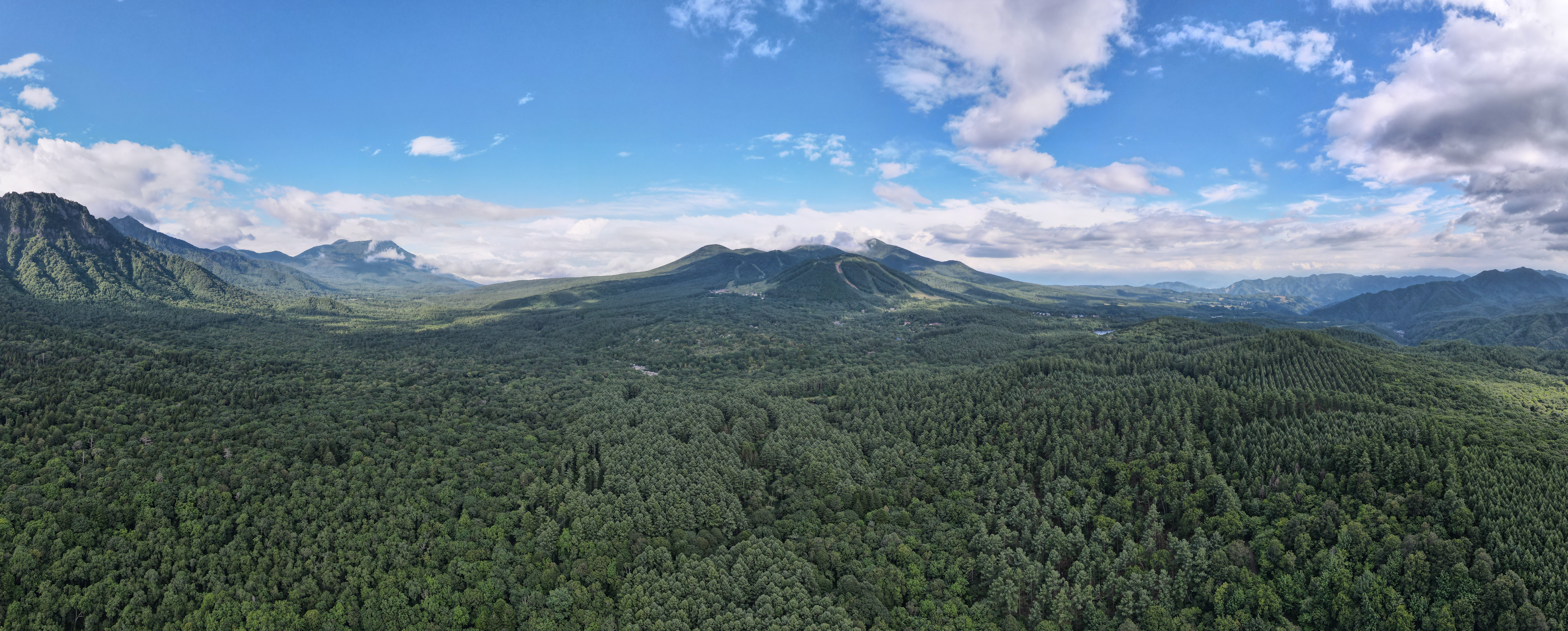
Aerial drone panorama of Mount Iizuna (August 2024)
