= Mount Togakushi =

Stratovolcano on the island of Honshu, Japan

- 戸隠山
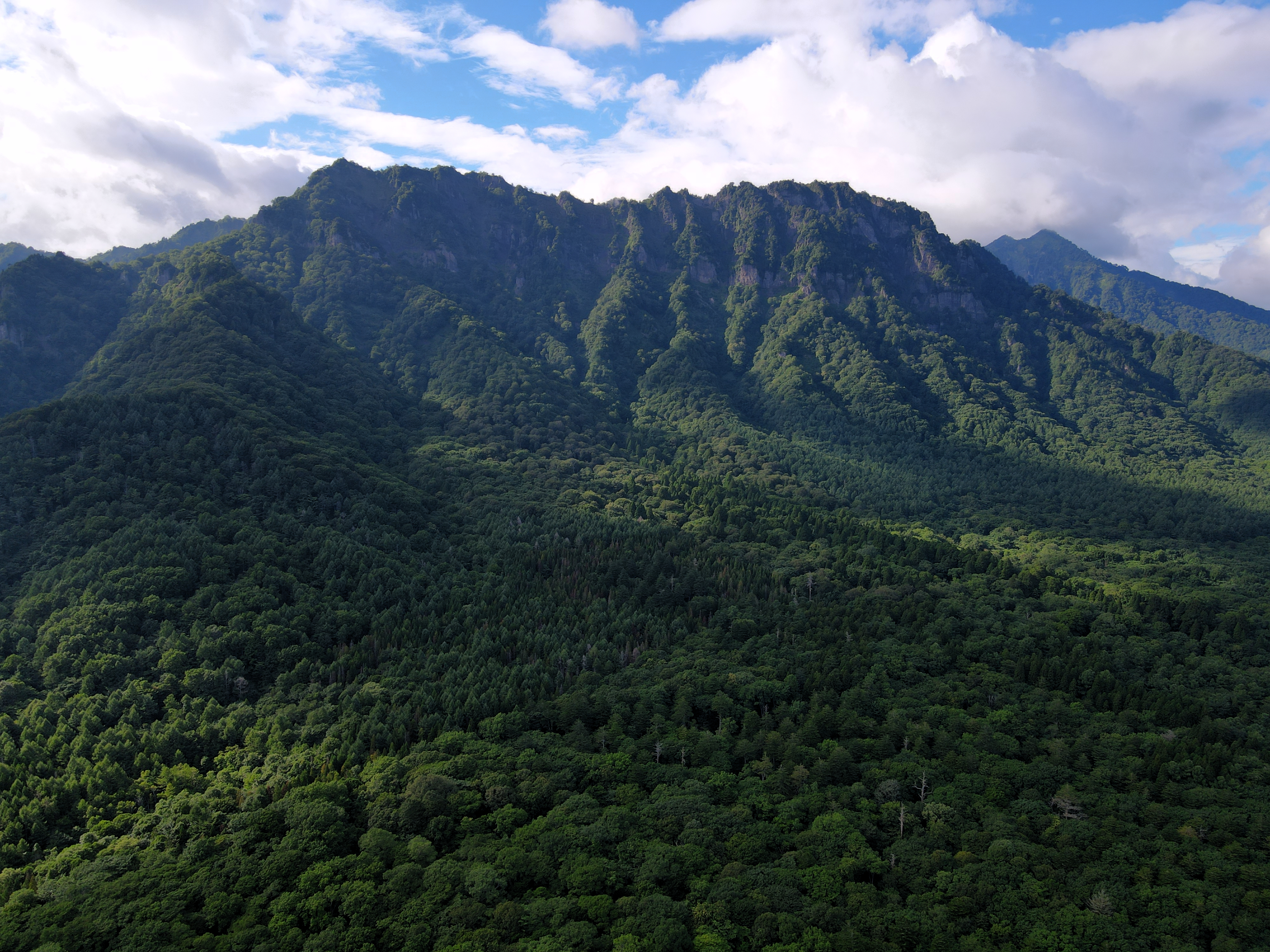
- Aerial drone photograph of Mount Togakushi

Highest point
- Elevation: 1,904 m (6,247 ft)
- Prominence: 156 m (512 ft)
- Listing: Five Mountains of Northern Shinshu
- Coordinates: 36°46′13″N 138°03′18″E

Geography
- Location within Nagano Prefecture Location within Japan
- Location: Nagano Prefecture, Japan

Mount Togakushi (Japanese: 戸隠山) is located in the former village of Togakushi, now located within the city of Nagano, Nagano, Japan. The mountain is 1904 meters (6247 ft) high. Mount Togakushi has traditionally been included in the Five Mountains of Northern Shinshu (北信五岳) that includes Mount Myōkō (妙高山), Mount Kurohime (黒姫山), Mount Iizuna (飯縄山) and Mount Madarao (斑尾山).

Mount Togakushi is now also part of Myōkō-Togakushi Renzan National Park. It is one of the 200 most famous mountains in Japan (日本に百名山), and one of the 100 most famous mountains in Nagano (信州百名山).

At the base of Mount Togakushi are located five Shintoist shrines belonging to Togakushi Shrine: Okusha Shrine (奥社), and just below it Kuzuryūsha Shrine (九頭龍社), sit on the mountain; the remaining three shrines, Chūsha Shrine (中社), Hōkōsha Shrine (宝光社), and Hinomikosha Shrine (火之御子社) are located further away in Togakushi village. Okusha, in particular, is known for its cedar-lined avenue to the shrine. Historically, Mount Togakushi, like Mount Iizuna nearby, has been a sacred site for mountain-based religious sects, generally called Shugendo.

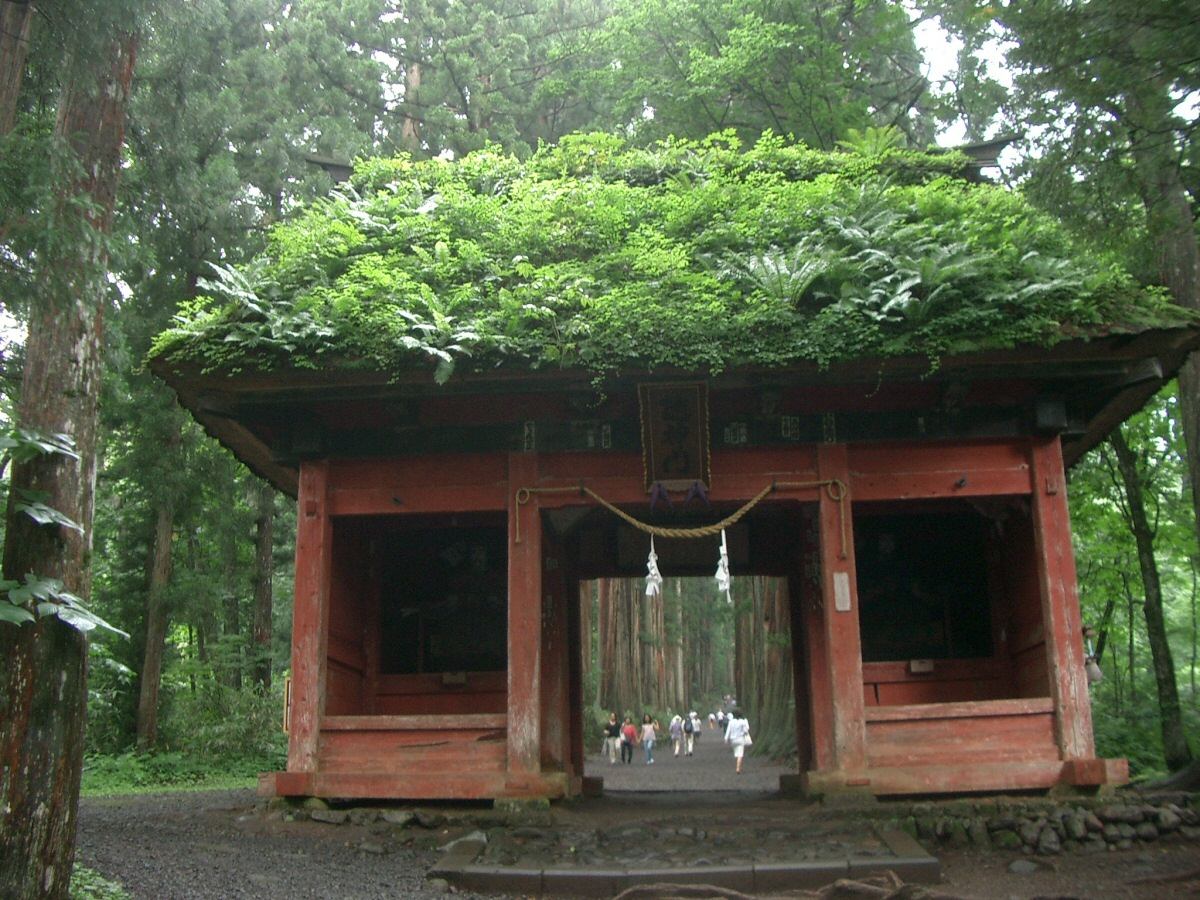
Zuishinmon Gate on the way to Okusha Shrine at the base of Mount Togakushi

== Name origin ==
The name Togakushi literally means hiding door. The origin of the name relates to Japanese mythology. According to the mythology, the sun goddess Amaterasu had hid herself in a cave in Kyushu, which brought darkness to the world. Other deities lured her to open the cave door, when one of the grabbed the stone door and threw it away (to Nagano) to prevent Amaterasu from hiding again.

== Tourism ==
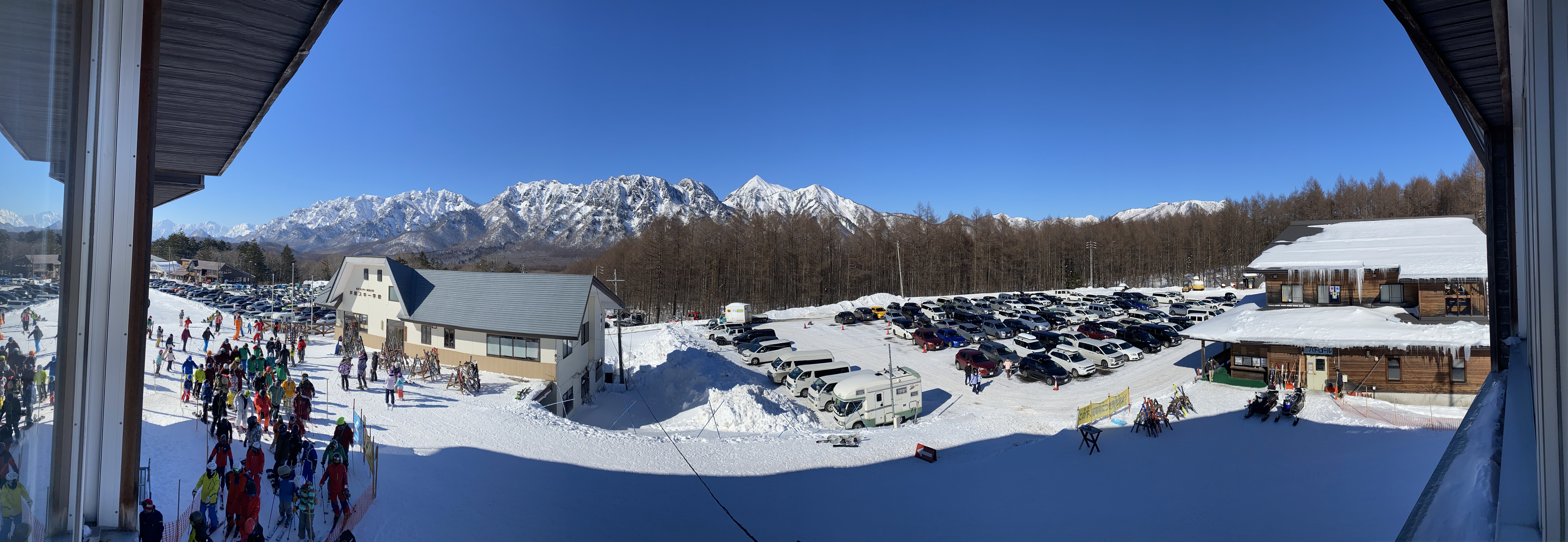
A panorama of Mount Togakushi, Mount Takatsuma, and Gojizo Mountain taken from the Togakushi Ski Field

Togakushi Ski Field (戸隠スキー場) is located on Menou Mountain (メノウ山) which faces Mount Togakushi. Togakushi Campground (戸隠キャンプ場) and Togakushi Farm (戸隠牧場) are located at the base of Mount Togakushi. All three are owned by Togakushi Company founded by local residents to promote the natural beauty of Mount Togakushi and surrounding area.

=== Hiking ===
Although hiking Mount Togakushi can be done in 7–8 hours, the trail is technically challenging. The rating for the mountain in the Nagano Trail Guide by Grade includes the following: There are some difficult rocky ridges, unstable scree slopes. Some sections have ladders or chains and thickets to push your way through.... Steep ups and downs where you need to use your hands.... Many dangerous sections with possibility of falling and sliding down.

One popular route begins at the Togakushi Shrine parking lot and finishes at Togakushi Campground. Togakushi Shrine parking lot → Zuishinmon (15 minutes) → Okusha Shrine (1340m) (15 minutes) → Hyakkennagaya (1763m) (60 minutes) → Ant Tower/Sword Blade (蟻の塔渡・剣の刃渡) (1842m) (60 minutes) → Happounirami (1900m) (20 minutes) → Togakushi summit (1904) (30 minutes) → Kuzuryuuyama (1883m) (75 minutes) → Ichifudo Emergency Hut (1747m) (75 minutes) → Ippoi Spring (1620m) (30 minutes) → Obiwa (1596m) (10 minutes) → Gate (1270m) (60 minutes) → Togakushi Campground (1175m) (40 minutes).

From Ichifudo, it is possible to hike to Gojizo Mountain and then Mount Takatsuma, one of 100 Famous Japanese Mountains.

=== Ninja ===
Togakushi was the location of the Togakure school of ninja from the 12th century. Today, there is a museum, the Togakure Ninpo Museum (戸隠流忍法資料館, Togakure-ryū Ninpō Shiryōkan), and children's theme park, Kids Ninja Village (チビッ子忍者村, Chibiko Ninja Mura), located near Mount Togakushi. The Togakure Ninpo Museum is located near the entrance to Okusha, at the base of the mountain. The Kids Ninja Village is located near Chūsha Shrine.

=== Access ===
From JR Nagano Station, buses run by Alpico Kōtsū leave approximately once every hour, and takes approximately 60 minutes (1500 yen). Various passes are available.

By car, Togakushi is approximately 20 minutes from central Nagano City via the Togakushi Bird Line.

== See also ==
- Five Mountains of Northern Shinshu
- Myōkō-Togakushi Renzan National Park
- Togakushi Shrine
- Tourism in Nagano Prefecture
