= Five Mountains of Northern Shinshu =

Distinctive mountains in the northern Nagano Prefecture, Japan

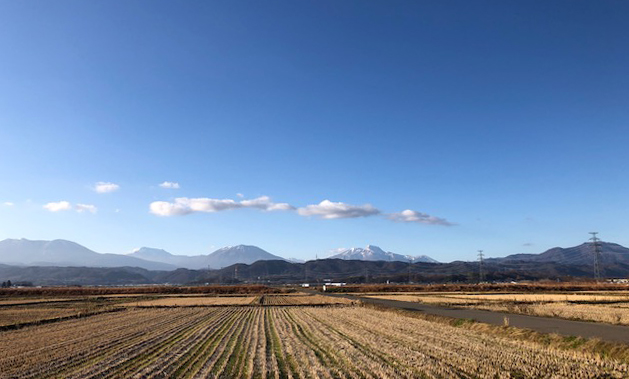
The Five Mountains of Northern Nagano in Late Fall: from left to right, Mounts Iizuna, Togakushi, Kurohime, Myoko and Madarao

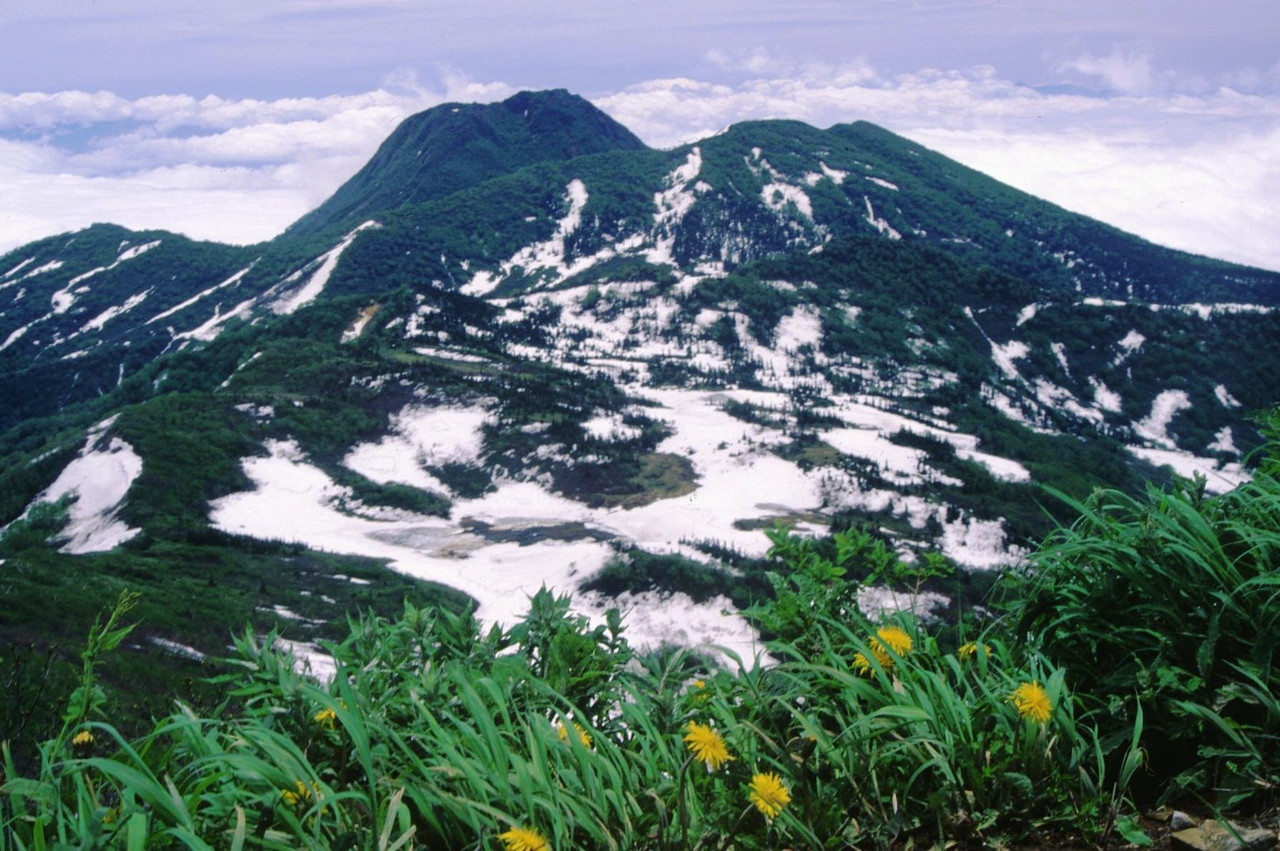
Mount Myoko

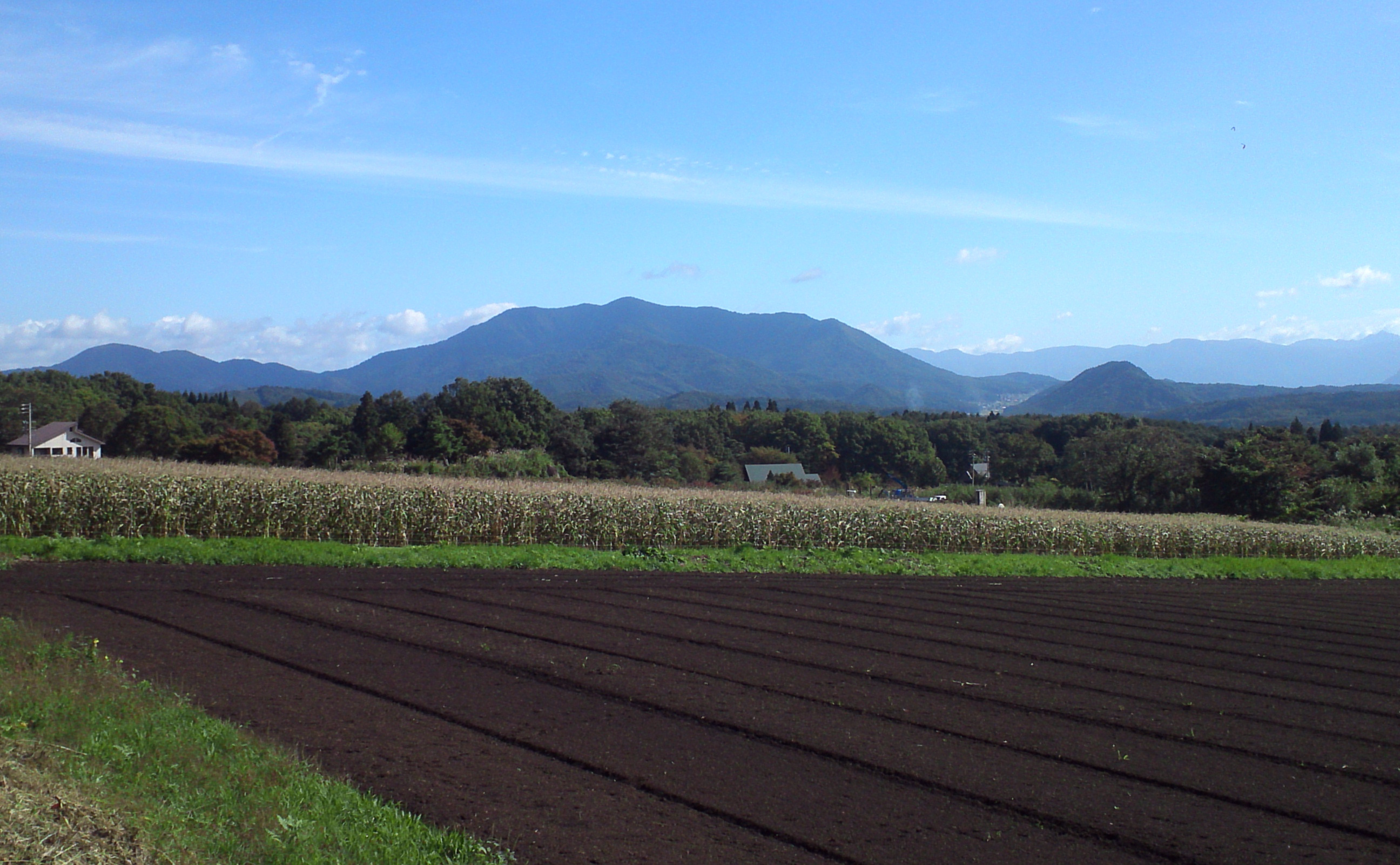
Mount Madarao

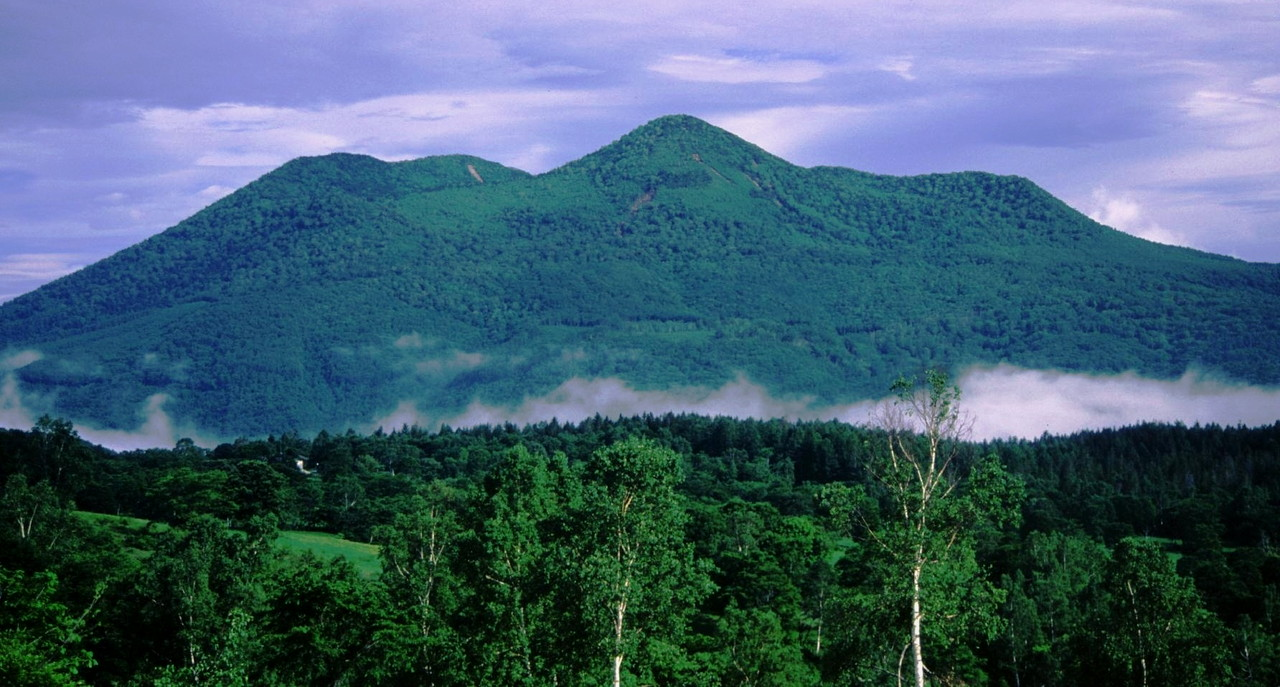
Mount Kurohime

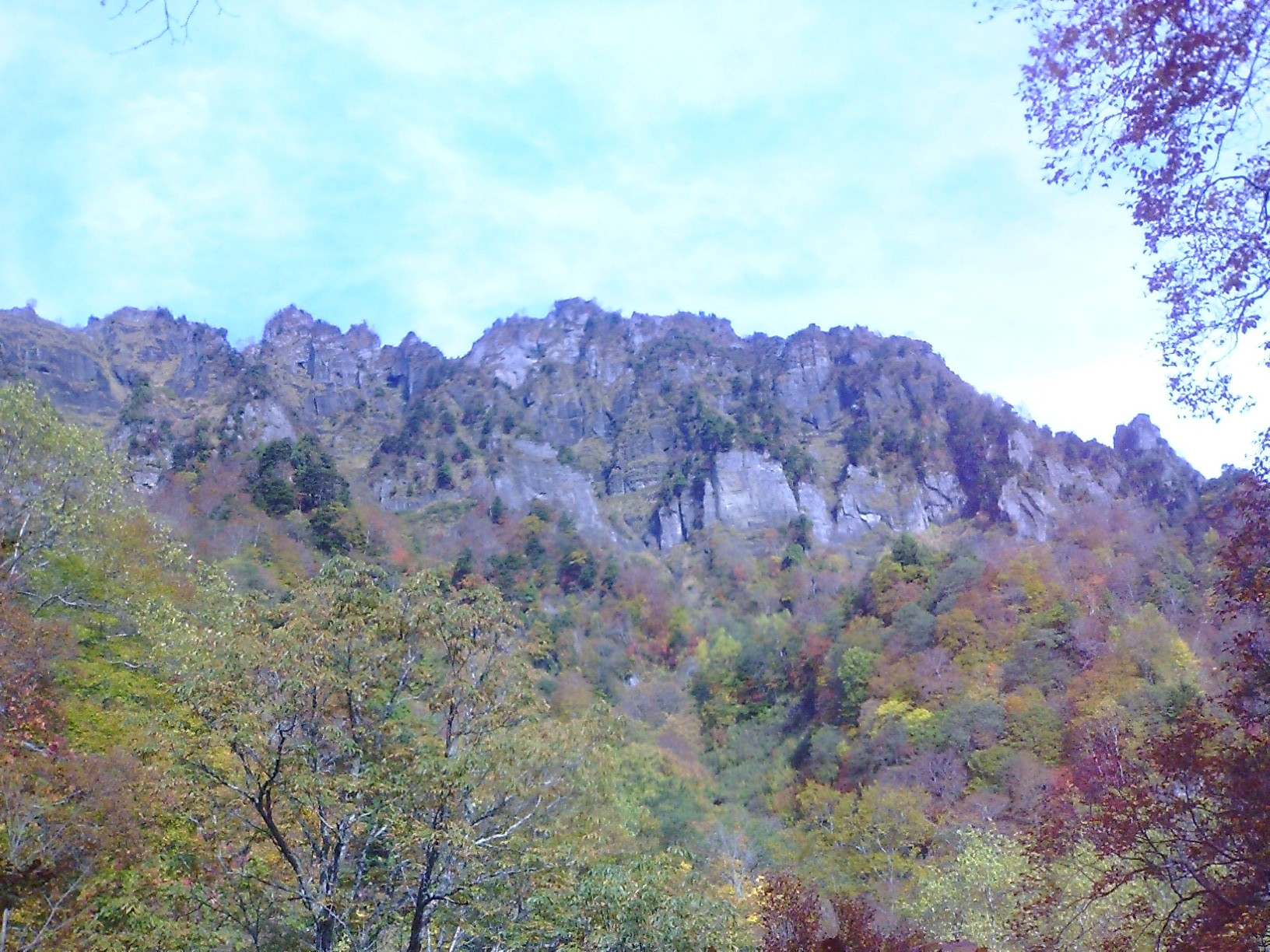
Mount Togakushi

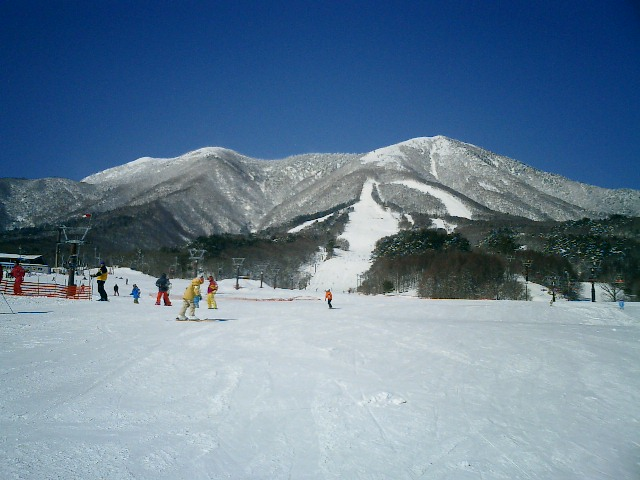
Mount Iizuna

The Five Mountains of Northern Shinshu (Japanese: 北信五岳) or Five Mountains of Northern Nagano Prefecture are the traditionally distinctive mountains that can be seen in the northern Nagano Prefecture. They are: Mt. Iizuna (飯縄山, 1917 meters above sea level), Mt. Togakushi (戸隠山, 1904 m), Mt. Kurohime (黒姫山, 2053 m), Mt. Madarao (斑尾山, 1381 m) and Mt. Myoko (妙高山, 2454 m).

They are all located in Nagano Prefecture, except Mt. Myoko which is in Niigata Prefecture. They are also, as of 2015, included in Myōkō-Togakushi Renzan National Park, except Mt. Madarao.

== Where to see these mountains ==
The Five Mountains of Northern Shinshu can be seen standing in a row from the southern part of Nakano City, Nagano Prefecture. They can also be observed in a row from the hot spring in Obuse Town.

== See also ==
- Tourism in Nagano Prefecture
- Myōkō-Togakushi Renzan National Park
