= Mount Kurohime =

Stratovolcano on the island of Honshu, Japan

- 黒姫山
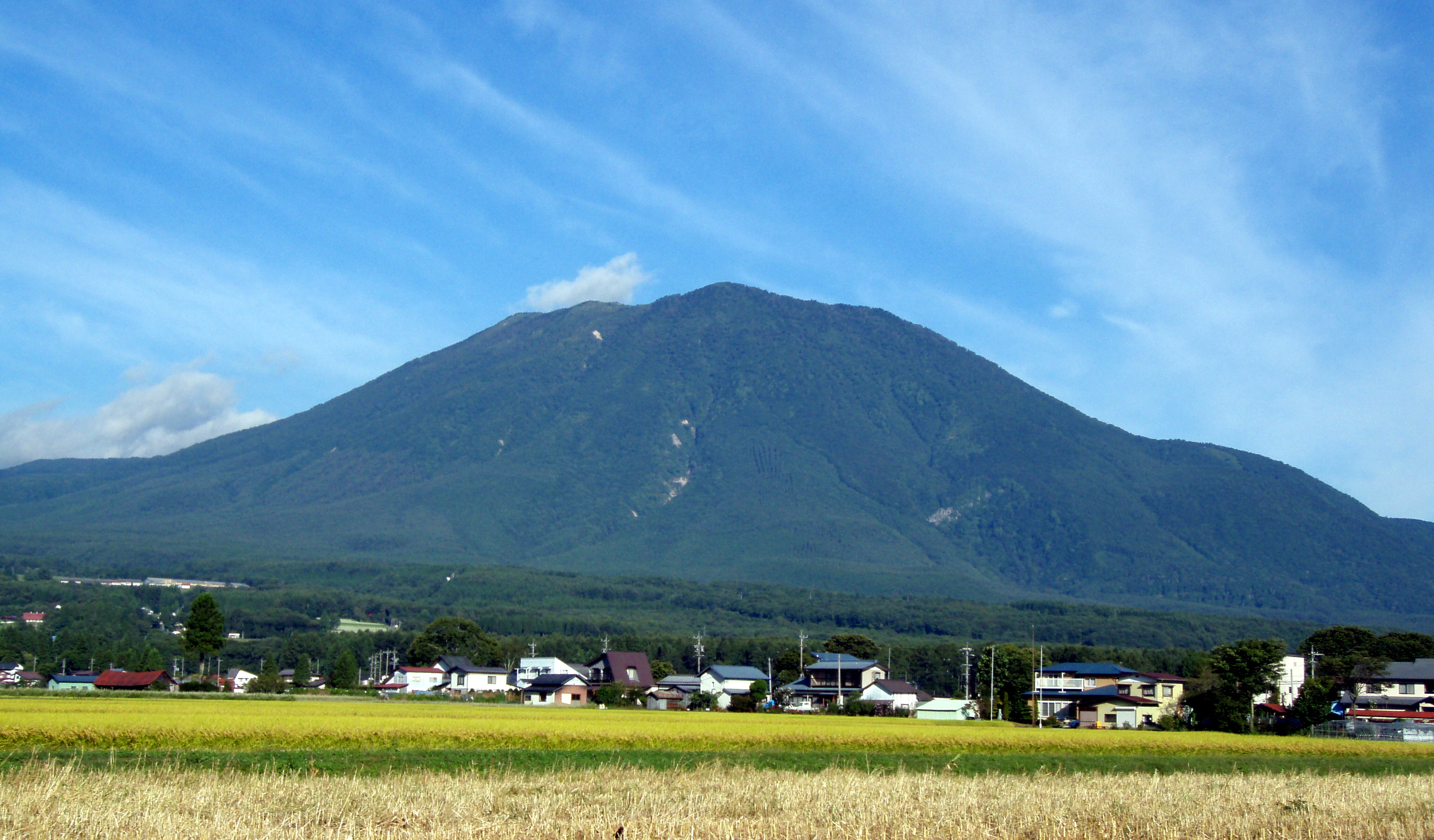
- Seen from the ESE

Highest point
- Elevation: 2,053 m (6,736 ft)
- Prominence: 496 m (1,627 ft)
- Listing: Five Mountains of Northern Shinshu
- Coordinates: 36°48′48″N 138°07′38″E

Geography
- Location within Nagano Prefecture Location within Japan
- Location: Nagano Prefecture, Japan

Geology
- Mountain type: Stratovolcano
- Volcanic arc: Northeastern Japan Arc

Mount Kurohime (Japanese: 黒姫山 Kurohime-yama) is a 2,053-metre (6,736 ft) stratovolcano located in Shinano town (信濃町), Nagano Prefecture, Japan. The mountain is one of the 200 most famous mountains in Japan (日本に百名山), and one of the 100 most famous mountains in Nagano (信州百名山).

Mount Kurohime is one of the "Five Mountains of Northern Shinshu" (北信五岳), which also includes two mountains located in Nagano City, Mount Iizuna (飯縄山), located 8.2 km to the south of Mount Kurohime, and Mount Togakushi (戸隠山), located 8 km to the southwest; Mount Madarao (斑尾山), located 13.4 km to the east-northeast in Shinano town and Iiyama; and Mount Myōkō (妙高山), located 8.8 km to the north in Myōkō city, Niigata Prefecture.

== Leisure activities ==
=== Hiking ===
There are several day-hike trails to the summit of Mount Kurohime.

One popular route, that is rated relatively easy according to the Nagano Trail Guide, starts at Togakushi Camp Site. From there it is 20 minutes to Ohashi forest road entrance (大橋林道入り口), 35 minutes to the trailhead (登山道入り口), 100 minutes to Shindobunki (1485m) (新道分岐), 35 minutes to Shiratamadaira (1970m) (しらたま平), 15 minutes to Mineno oike bunki (1975m) (峰ノ大池分岐), and 10 minutes to the summit (2053m) (黒姫山山頂). There is also limited parking at Ohashi forest road entrance.

An alternative route is to begin at Ohashi trailhead (大橋口山口), five minutes on foot along Nagano Prefectural Road Route 36 from Ohashi forest road entrance. From the Ohashi trailhead it is 30 minutes to Furuike (1200m) (古池), then 100 minutes to Shindobunki (1485m) (新道分岐), and then the same as above.

There is an additional, although more physically challenging route due to the steepness of the route, beginning approximately 2.5 km from Kurohime Station.

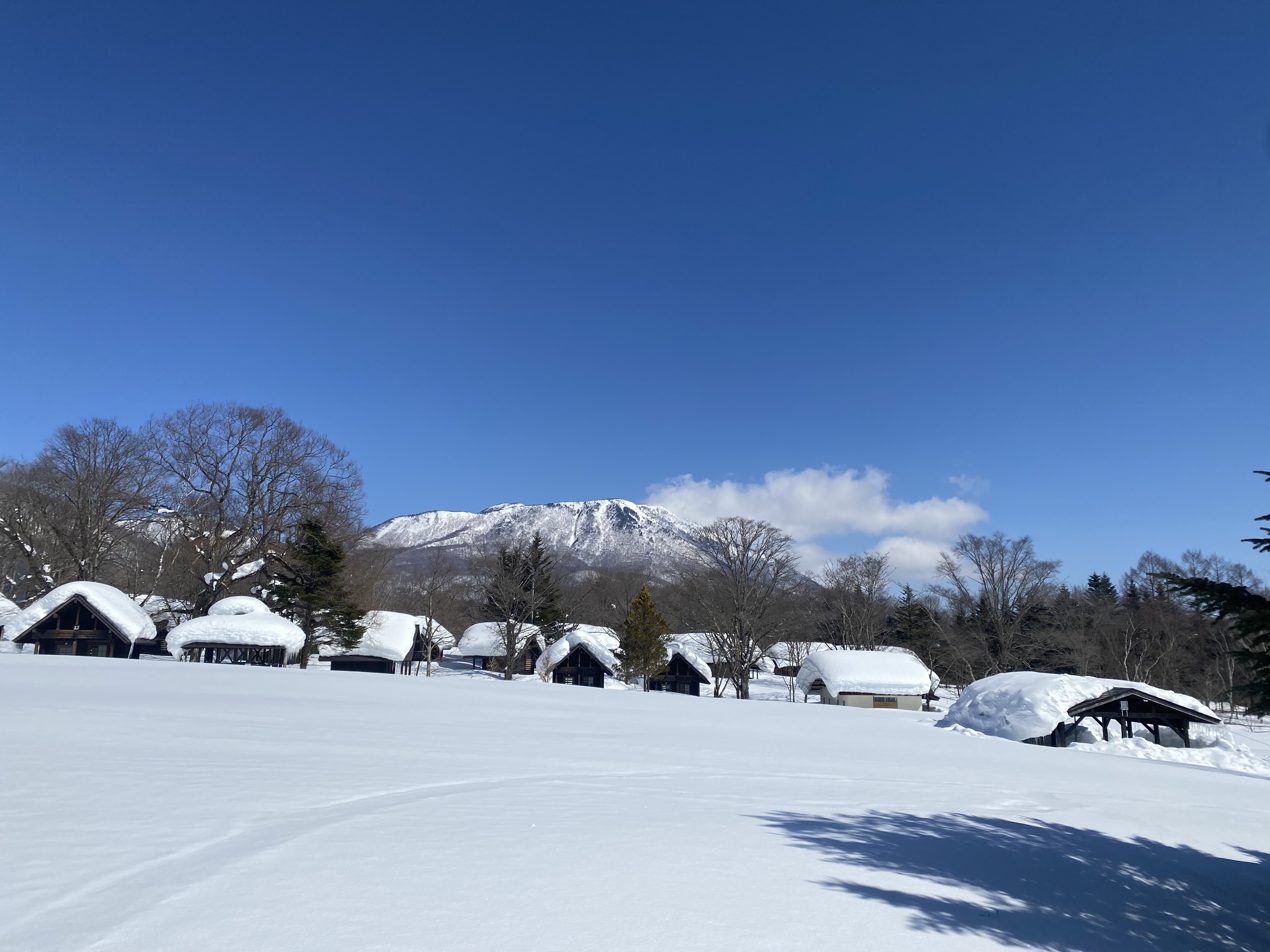
Mount Kurohime in winter from Togakushi Campground

=== Skiing ===
Kurohime Kogen Ski Resort is located in Shinano town on the eastern slopes of Mount Kurohime.

== In folklore ==
Mount Kurohime is famous for the folktale of Kurohime Monogatari, a tragic story about a snake (or dragon) living in Lake Iwakura (or Onuma Pond, depending on the version) and a princess of the Takanashi clan.

Kurohime was proposed to by a snake, but her father Takanashi Masamori refused. The snake grew angry after being rejected multiple times, and tried to destroy the castle town. To placate the snake, Kurohime gave herself up. There are various versions of the ending. In one version, Kurohime dropped a sword and her hair in Lake Iwakura following the advice of a local god, defeating the snake but also disappearing herself. Another ending claimed she willingly went to live with the snake on top of Mount Kurohime.

The name of the mountain is said to originate from the story's titular protagonist.

== See also ==
- Five Mountains of Northern Shinshu
- List of volcanoes in Japan
- List of mountains in Japan
