= Spiral (bobsleigh, luge, and skeleton) =

Bobsleigh, luge, and skeleton track in Nagano Prefecture, Japan

Coordinates: 36°42′39″N 138°9′27″E

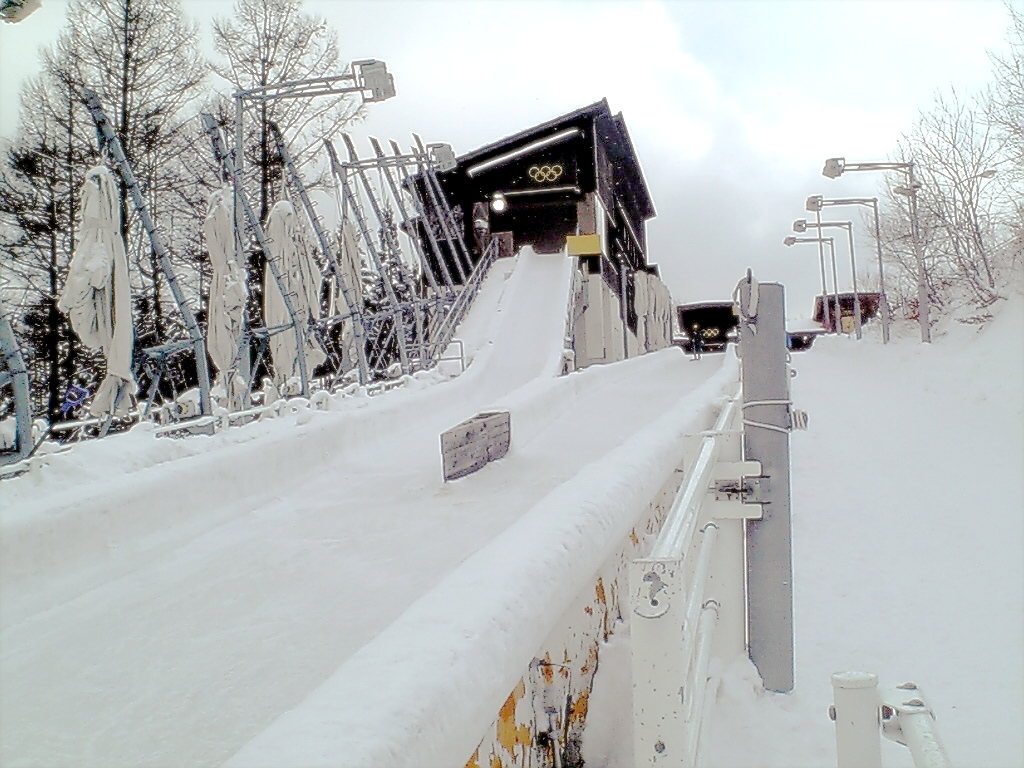
Men's singles luge start house (left) and bobsleigh start in 2007.

The Spiral is a bobsleigh, luge, and skeleton track located in Iizuna village, located north of Nagano, Japan. Used for the bobsleigh and luge competitions for the 1998 Winter Olympics, it is the first permanent bobsleigh, luge, and skeleton track in Asia and the first of its type in the world with two or more uphill sections. It is officially referred to as the Nagano Bobsleigh-Luge Park in Japan.

== History and current status ==
The track was among part of the venues used for the 1998 Winter Olympics that was started in 1990. Construction on the track started in November 1993 and was completed in March 1996 with homologation from the International Bobsleigh and Tobogganing Federation (FIBT) on 28 March 1996 and from the International Luge Federation on 24 June 1997. This track was referred to as the "Spiral" because of the winding track and dynamic movement of the sleds.

The track has not been in active use for training or competitions since February 2018 when ice creation ceased. The reason for this was due to lack of operating revenue. Twenty years since the Nagano Olympics was hosted, various equipment like the electronic display board, refrigeration and lighting systems are needing to be replaced due to obsolescence and wear. While the track was in active use, the annual operational and repair budget was 220 million yen. However, after the track operations were suspended, the operational budget shrunk to only 20 million yen.

There were plans to use the Spiral once again as an Olympic sliding venue if Sapporo was successful in its bid to host the 2030 Winter Olympics. But, even if the Spiral was used for the 2030 Olympics, there were obvious fears that the track would once again cease to be commercially viable after the Olympics were held. However, Sapporo dropped its bid for 2030.

As of February 2022, 24 years after the Nagano Olympics was held, with the track no longer in active use nor properly cleaned and maintained, the track has degenerated into a dilapidated state.

== Track technical details ==
Overall track construction cost ¥ 10.1 billion. The course was constructed in conformance of the natural topography of Mt. Iizuna. Three indirect ammonia refrigeration systems are located along the track, limiting the amount of ammonia to be under 800 kg (1,800 lb). During construction, rocks and trees that were dug up were used as materials to build settling ponds and a retaining wall to prevent landslides. Topsoil that had been removed during construction was returned to the site once groundwork was completed. About 40,000 saplings, mainly beech and oak, were planted two per square meter, as part of the environmental stewardship committed during the Winter Games.

To help with ice making techniques, Nagano Organizing Committee officials recruited Ralf Mende, who works for the bobsleigh, luge, and skeleton track in Altenberg, Germany to train staff to make proper ice. Mende and his crew worked 18 hours a day during the 1998 Games to ensure track thickness was 2–3 cm (1–1 in) of ice. Sun shades are used in an effort to maintain the operating temperatures of −10 to −15 °C (14 to 5 °F). Track competitions were also moved to the afternoon during the games to avoid the sunniest hours. There are a total of 56 sensors located throughout the track to maintain constant ice temperature and thickness.

== Statistics ==
Physical statistics
Sport	Length (meters)	Turns	Vertical drop (start to finish)	Average grade (%)
Bobsleigh and skeleton	1360	14	113	8.64
Luge - men's singles	1326	14	114	
Luge - women's singles/ men's doubles	1194	13	96	

There are no listed turn names for the track. The track's two uphill sections are right after turn 8 with an average uphill inclination close to 4% and between turns 10 and 11 with an average uphill inclination of nearly 10%.

Track records
Sport	Record	Nation - athlete(s)	Date	Time (seconds)
Luge - men's singles	Track	David Möller - Germany	13 February 2004	48.813
Luge - women's singles	Track	Silke Kraushaar - Germany	14 February 2004	49.744
Luge - men's doubles	Track	Germany - Patric Leitner & Alexander Resch	14 February 2004	49.279

== Championships hosted ==
- Winter Olympics: 1998
- FIBT World Championships: 2003 (Men's and women's skeleton)
- FIL World Luge Championships: 2004
