= Mount Hiuchi =

Mountain in the country of Japan

- 火打山
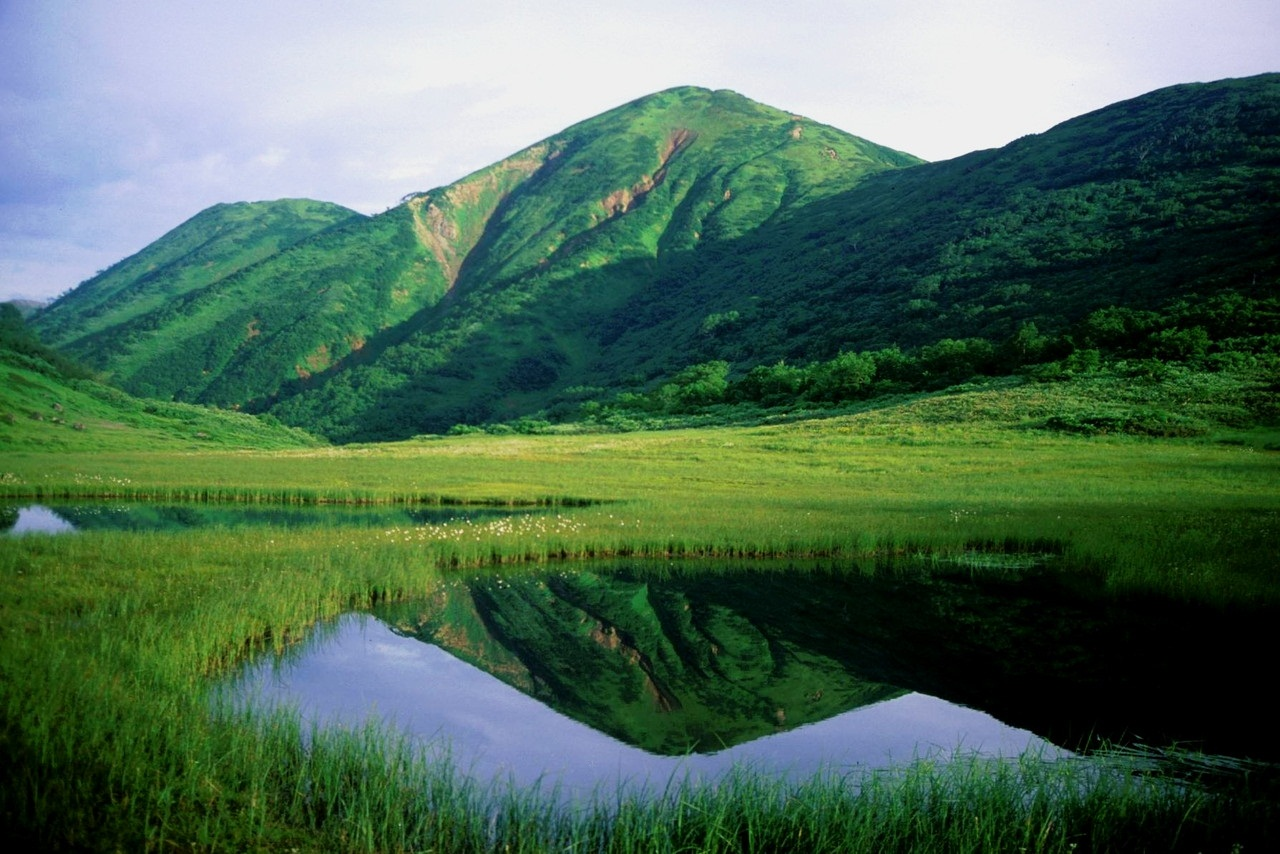
- Mount Hiuchi seen from the Tengu Garden mire

Highest point
- Elevation: 2,462 m (8,077 ft)
- Prominence: 1,637 m (5,371 ft)
- Listing: Ultra; List of mountains in Japan; 100 Famous Japanese Mountains; Ribu
- Coordinates: 36°55′22″N 138°04′05″E

Naming
- Language of name: Japanese
- Pronunciation: [çiɯtɕijama]

Geography
- Location within Japan Location within Niigata Prefecture
- Location: Itoigawa and Myōkō, Niigata Prefecture, Japan
- Parent range: Kubiki Mountains
- Topo map(s): Geospatial Information Authority 25000:1 湯川内; 50000:1 妙高山

Climbing
- Easiest route: Hike

Mount Hiuchi (火打山, Hiuchi-yama) is one of the 100 Famous Japanese Mountains, reaching the height of 2,462 m (8,077 ft). It is situated in Japan's Kubiki Mountains in Niigata Prefecture. It was specified for Jōshin'etsu Kōgen National Park on July 10, 1956, but since has been absorbed by the Togakushi-Renzan National Park, which encompasses Mount Myōkō (妙高山 Myōkō-san) and Mount Niigata-Yake (新潟焼山 Niigata-Yakeyama).

== Outline ==
The surrounding area is deep snow country. This mountain is famous for the many alpine plants found above the tree line. The Siberian Dwarf Pine can be seen here, together with fauna such as the Rock Ptarmigan. There are several climbing routes to the top of the mountain, principally from Sasagemine after the annual spring re-opening of the road. The Kōya-ike pond along the route is noted for its autumn foliage. Accommodation in the alpine environment are the Kōya mountain hut with campground, and the Kurosawa-ike hut also with campground. Both are located is to the southeast of the peak on the mountain trail system.

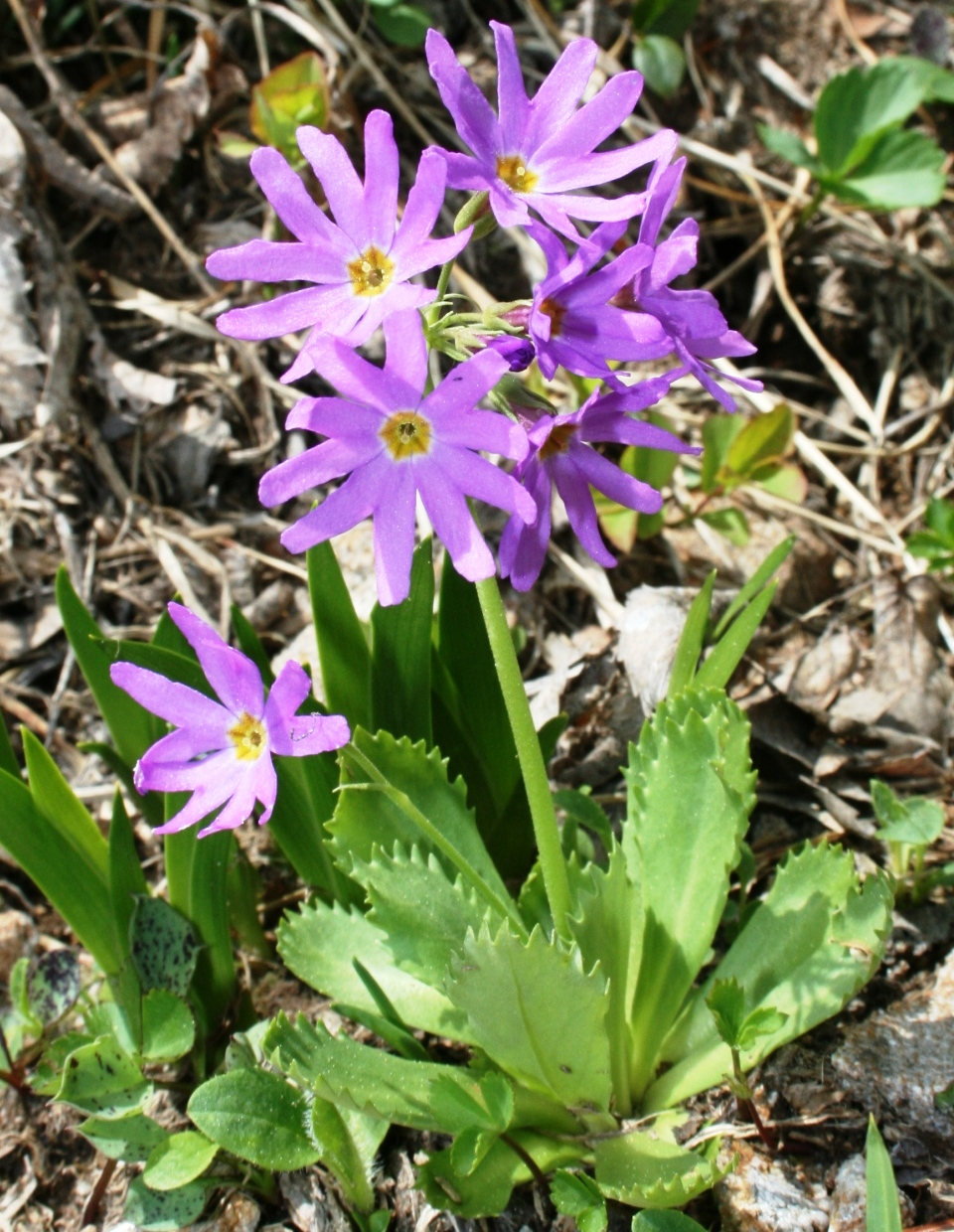
Hakusankozakura

Sumie Tanaka selected this mountain as one of the "100 famous flower mountains of Japan". She described the Hakusankozakura (ハクサンコザクラ) (Primula cuneifolia, Ledeb. var. hakusanensis Makino) as a representative flower.

== Scenery of Mount Hiuchi ==
Mount Hiuchi seen from the Tengu garden mire	Kōya-ike pond and Kōya mountain hut	Mount Myōkō seen from Mount Hiuchi	Siberian Dwarf Pine and Rock Ptarmigan

== See also ==
- Jōshin'etsu Kōgen National Park
- List of mountains in Japan
- List of Ultras of Japan
- 100 Famous Japanese Mountains
