= Togakushi Shrine =

Shinto shrine in Nagano Prefecture, Japan

Togakushi Shrine (戸隠神社, Togakushi Jinja)
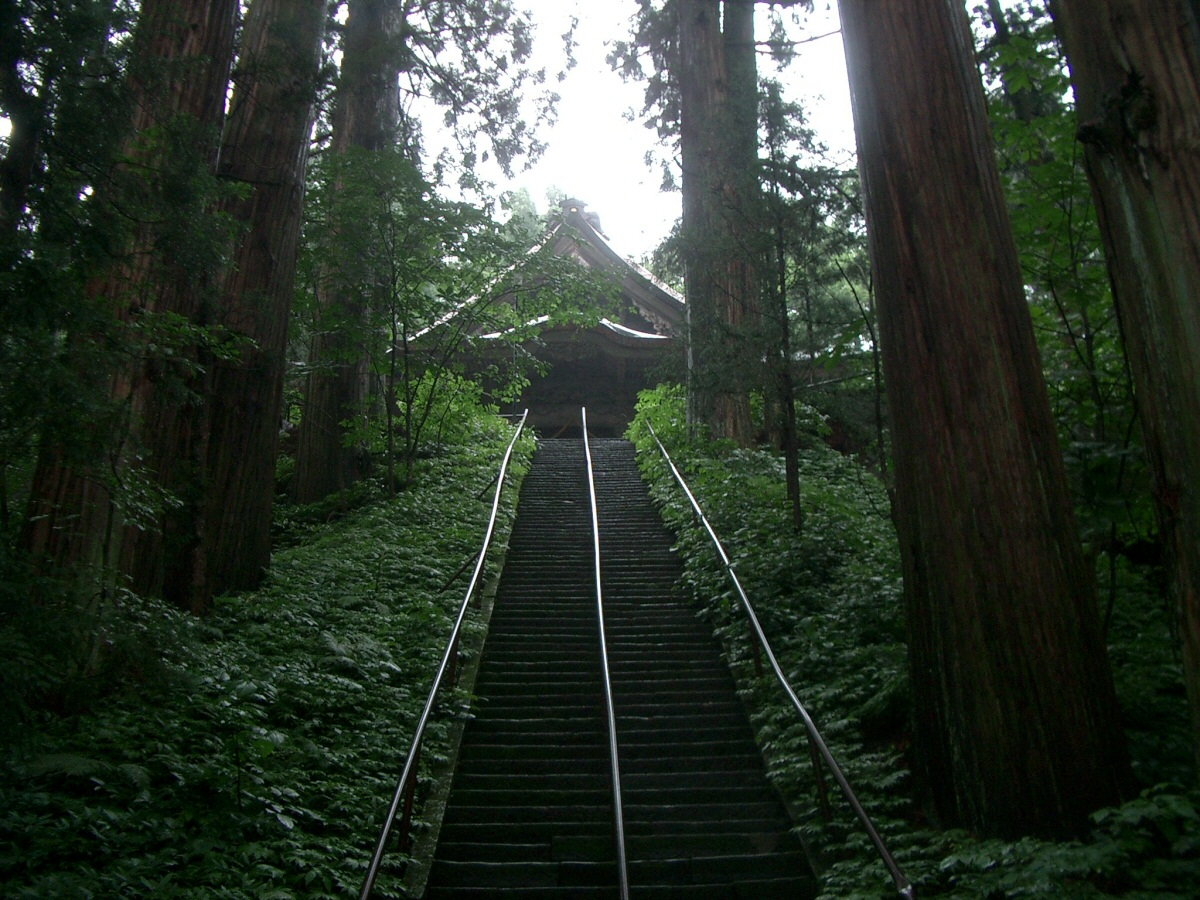
- The Lower Shrine, Hōkō-sha

- Location within Japan

Religion
- Affiliation: Shinto
- Prefecture: Nagano Prefecture

Location
- Location: Togakushi, Nagano City
- Prefecture: Nagano Prefecture
- Coordinates: 36°44′34″N 138°05′07″E

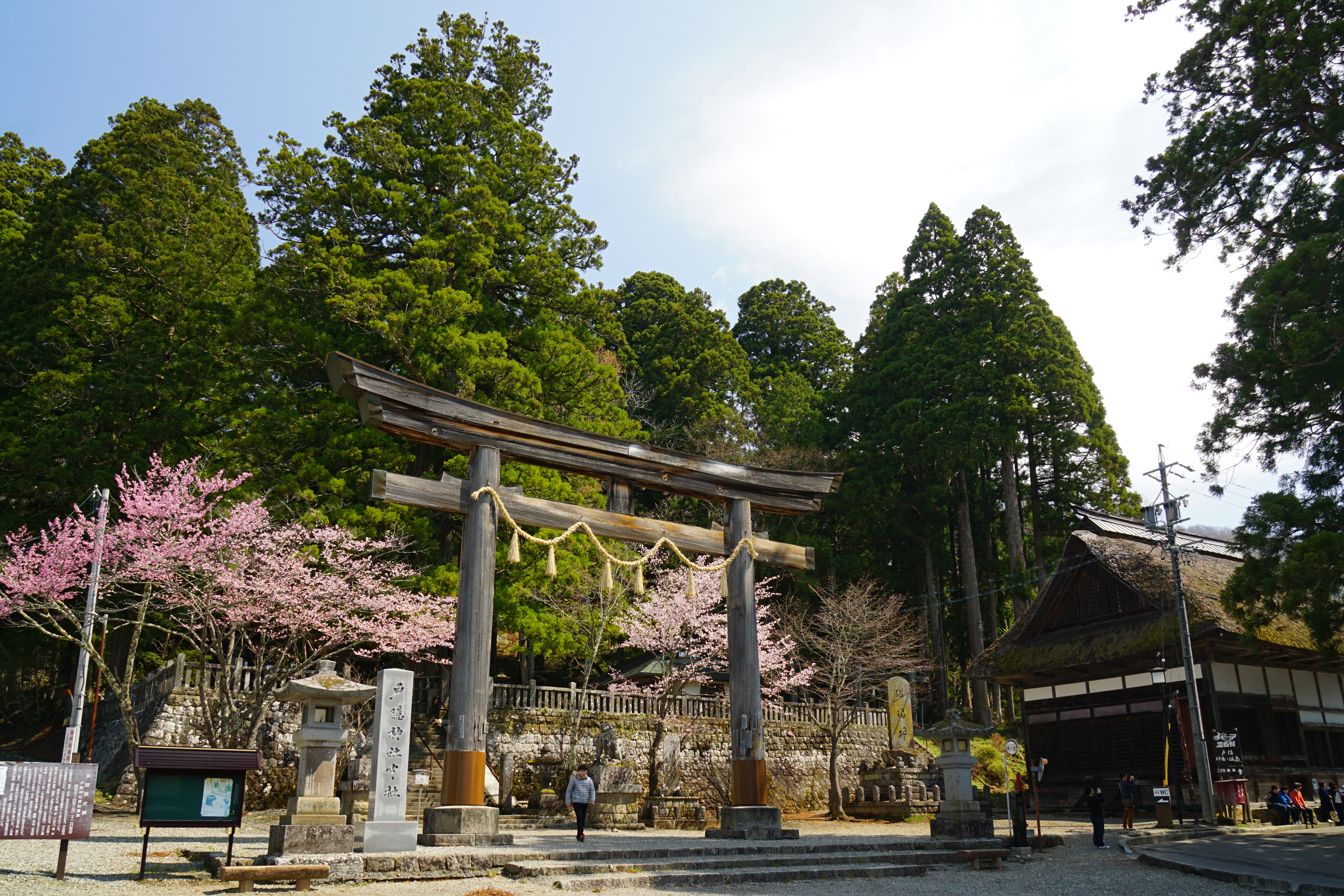
The middle shrine Chū-sha

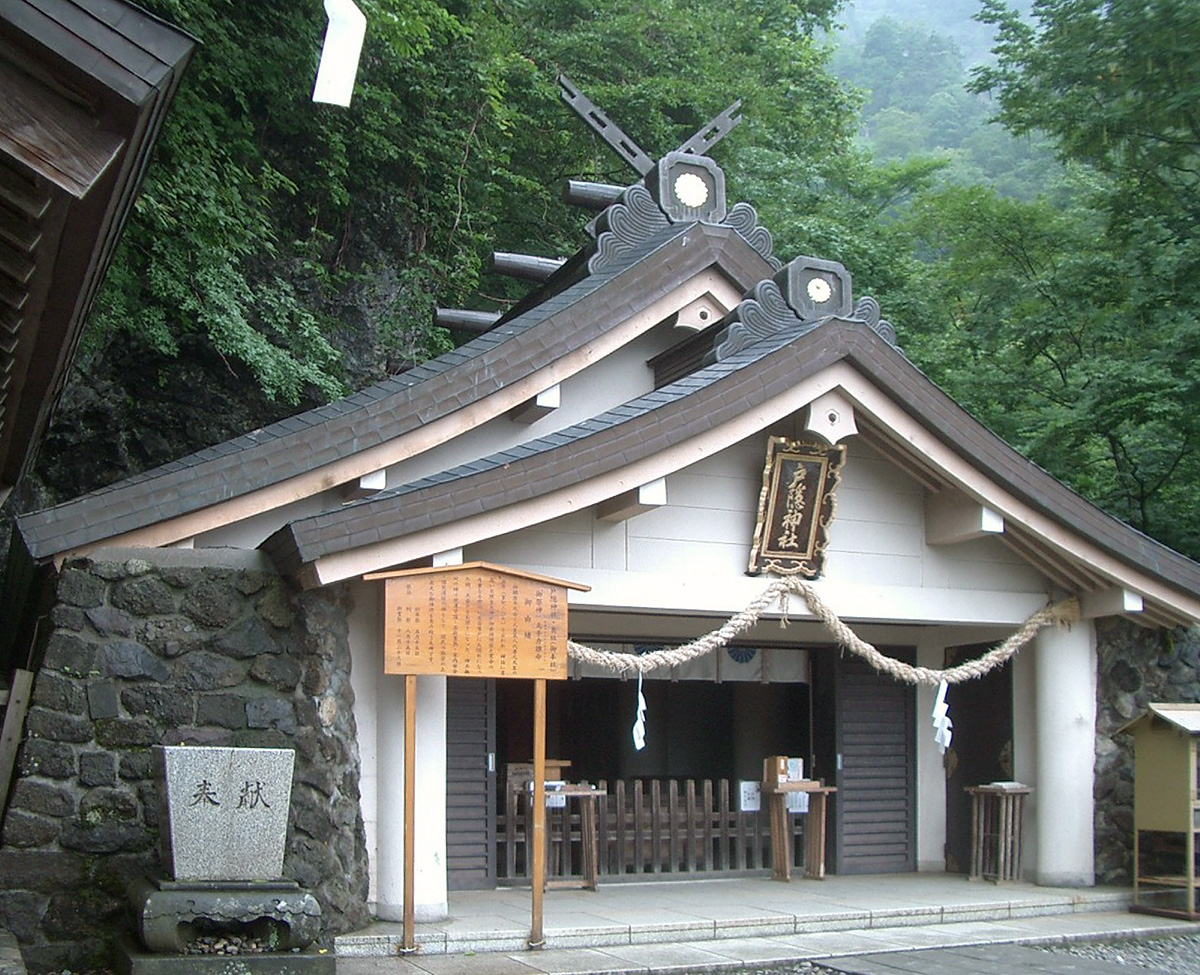
The upper shrine Oku-sha

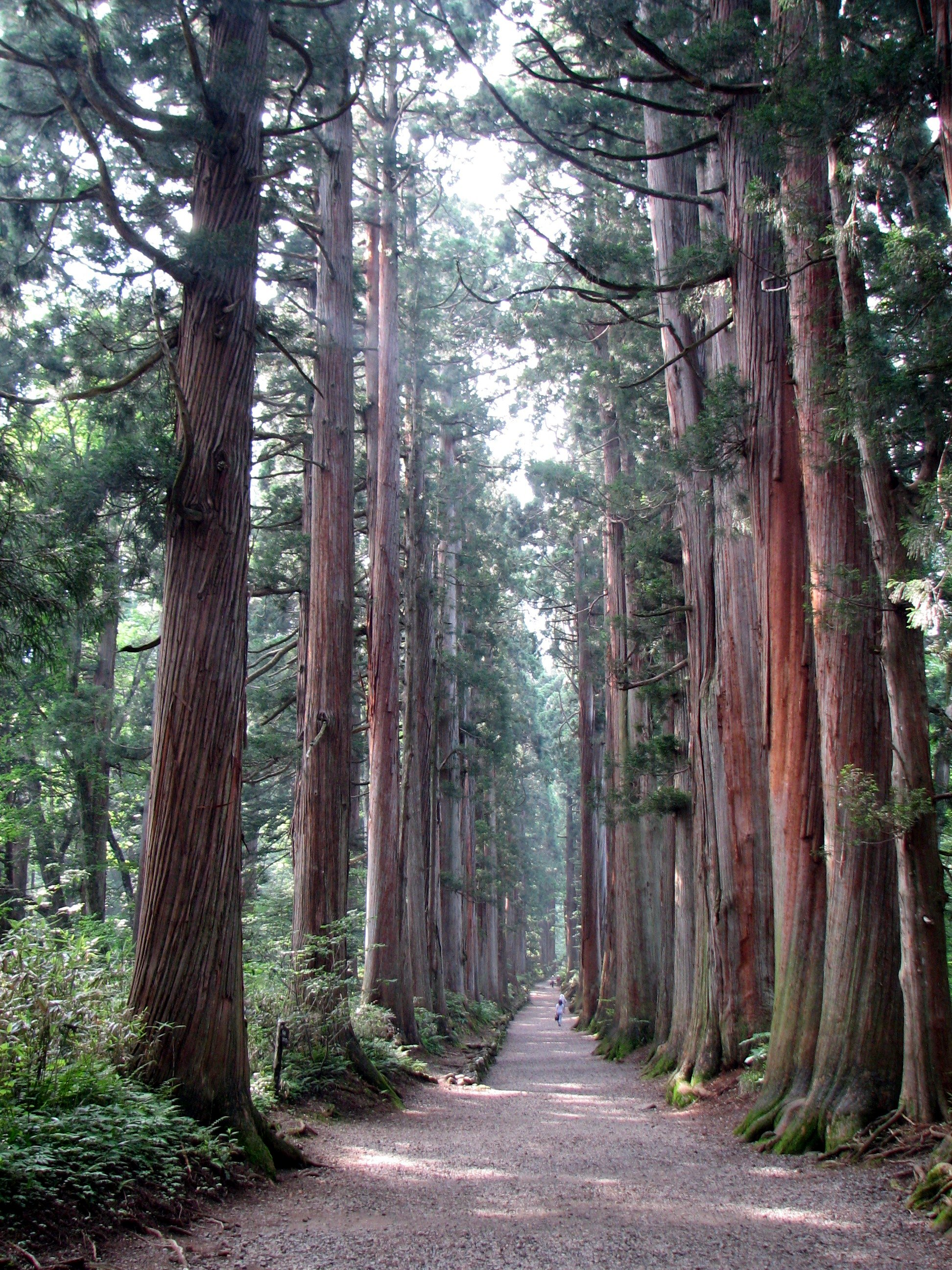
Planted in the 17th century, the cedar-lined approach to the upper shrine Oku-sha

The Togakushi Shrine (戸隠神社, Togakushi Jinja) is a Shinto shrine in Togakushi, Nagano City, Nagano Prefecture, Japan. The shrine is at the base of Mount Togakushi (1,904 metres (6,247 ft)) in Myōkō-Togakushi Renzan National Park.

== Shrines ==
Togakushi Shrine consists of five shrines that can be visited in any order:

- The Lower Shrine (宝光社, Hōkō-sha) enshrines the deity Ame-no-Uwaharu-no-Mikoto. It is believed to offer blessings related to academic life, sewing, safe delivery, and the protection of women and children.
- Hinomiko-sha (火之御子社) enshrines four deities with the main deity being Ame-no-Uzume-no-Mikoto. There are two 500 year old Japanese cedars known as the "husband and wife cedars" (夫婦の杉, Fufu-no-Sugi) and a famous cherry blossom tree known as Saigyo Zakura. The shrine is believed to offer blessings for marriage, love, fire prevention, and entertainment.
- The Middle Shrine (中社, Chū-sha) has the head office of Togakushi Shrine. It enshrines Ame-no-Yagokoro-Omoikane-no-Mikoto and has several Japanese cedar trees ranging from 700 to 800 years old. It offers blessings for things such as academic achievement and business prosperity.
- The Upper Shrine (奥社, Oku-sha) enshrines Ame-no-Tachikarao-no-Mikoto. The approach to the shrine is about 2 kilometers long. The path to the shrine is lined with 400 year old Japanese cedars which are designated as Natural Monuments of Japan. About halfway through the approach to the shrine, there is a red gate called Zuishinmon (随神門). The shrine is believed to offer good fortune, good harvests, and victory in sports.
- Kuzuryu-sha (九頭龍社) literally means "nine-headed dragon shrine." It is dedicated to Kuzuryu-no-Okami, the deity of water, rain, and the prevention of tooth decay.

There is a goshuin stamp available at each of the five shrines. Many of the shrines are separated by several kilometers, so personal vehicles and regularly scheduled buses can be used for transportation between shrines.

It is the Sōja shrine of Kazusa Province.

== History ==
In one theory, the upper shrine, or Oku-sha, is said to have been first constructed in the 5th year of the Emperor Kogen (210 BC) while Buddhist tradition holds that a monk named Gakumon discovered the Oku-sha area and began the practice of Shugendo there in the 2nd year of the Kasha era (849 AD). According to the Nihon-Shoki, the Emperor Tenmu had a map of the area made in 684 AD and a temporary building built the following year.

Togakushi shrine was a pilgrimage site during the following eight centuries. Its name was ranked with the Ise-jingu Shrine, Koya-san Temple and Enryaku-ji temples. Togakushisan Kansyuin Kenkou-ji was the formal name of the Togakushi Temple.

Two major esoteric Buddhist sects, Shingon and Tendai fought for the hegemony of Togakushi Temple. Eventually the Shingon sect lost the battle. Togakushi Temple was changed to a shrine by the Meiji government's Buddhism/Shinto separation initiatives "Shinbutsu bunri", "Haibutsu kishaku", and the 1868 Temple Ordinance. Until that time, it was common in Japan for the same buildings to be used as both temples (Buddhist) and shrines (Shinto). Until the 19th century, Buddhist activities at the Togakushi Temple were dedicated to "Avalokiteśvara".

== Site ==
Upon arrival at Togakushi it is recommended to first visit Oku-sha and then Kuzuryu-sha. It is a 2 kilometer hike from the entrance to the two shrines, however the path leading deep into the mountain can only be taken on foot. Beyond the cedar-lined path, you will be able to see the torii gate for Oku-sha at the bottom of the mountain and the shaden main building of the shrine as well. During winter the paths are closed but snowshoeing may be possible, although in Jan 2026 it was completely closed for visitors.

== See also ==
- List of Shinto shrines in Japan
- Modern system of ranked Shinto Shrines
- Iigaoka Hachimangu (the other Sōja shrine of Kazusa Province)
- Tamasaki Shrine (Kazusa Province Ichinomiya)
