= Mount Madarao =

Mountain in Japan

Coordinates: 36°50′13″N 138°16′25″E

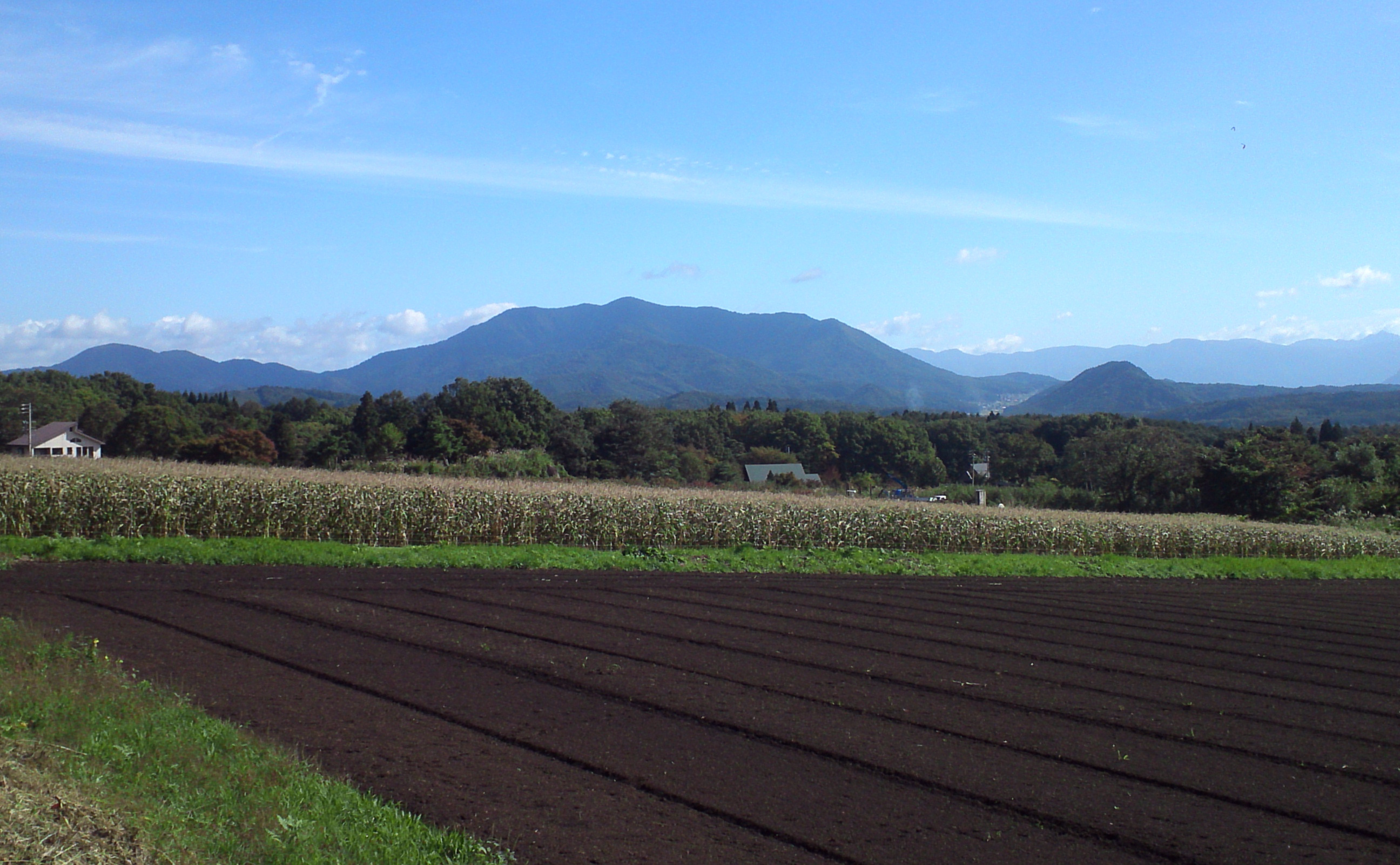
Mount Madarao seen from the WSW.

Mount Madarao (Japanese: 斑尾山) is an extinct volcano located between Iiyama and Shinano, Nagano, Japan. It is 1382 meters (4534 ft) high.

Mount Madarao has traditionally been included in the Five Mountains of Northern Shinshu. Compared to other mountains (Iizuna 1917 meters, Togakushi 1904, Kurohime 2053, and Myoko 2454), it is a low mountain, but looks a mountain of comparable height because it is nearest to Nakano, Nagano where the Five Mountains have been defined. In winter, the ski slopes of Madarao Mountain Resort and Tangram Ski Circus are in operation.

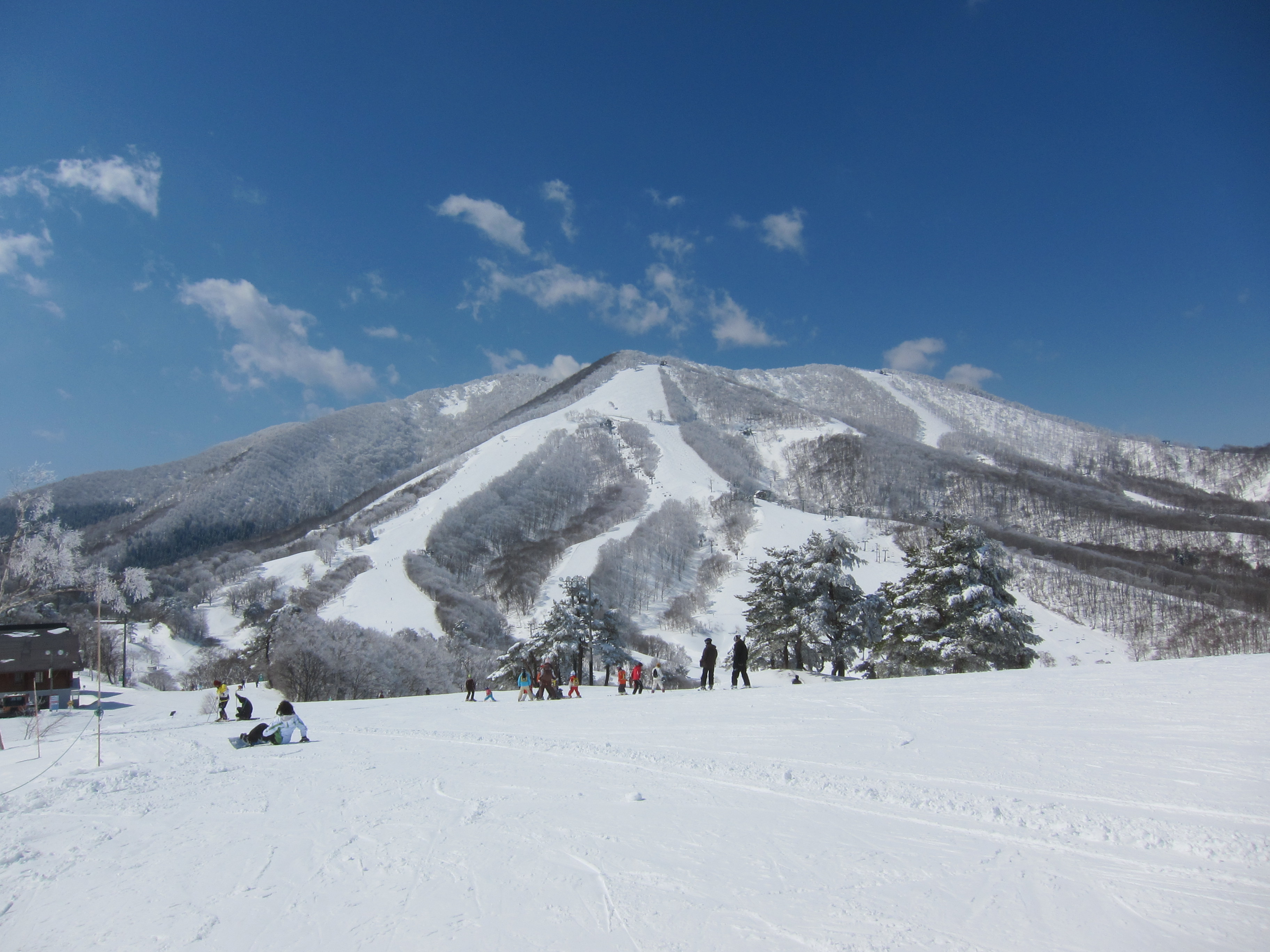
Mount Madarao seen from the northeast. Taken from Madarao Kogen Ski Resort.

== See also ==
- Tourism in Nagano Prefecture
