= Mount Myōkō =

Active stratovolcano on the island of Honshu in Japan

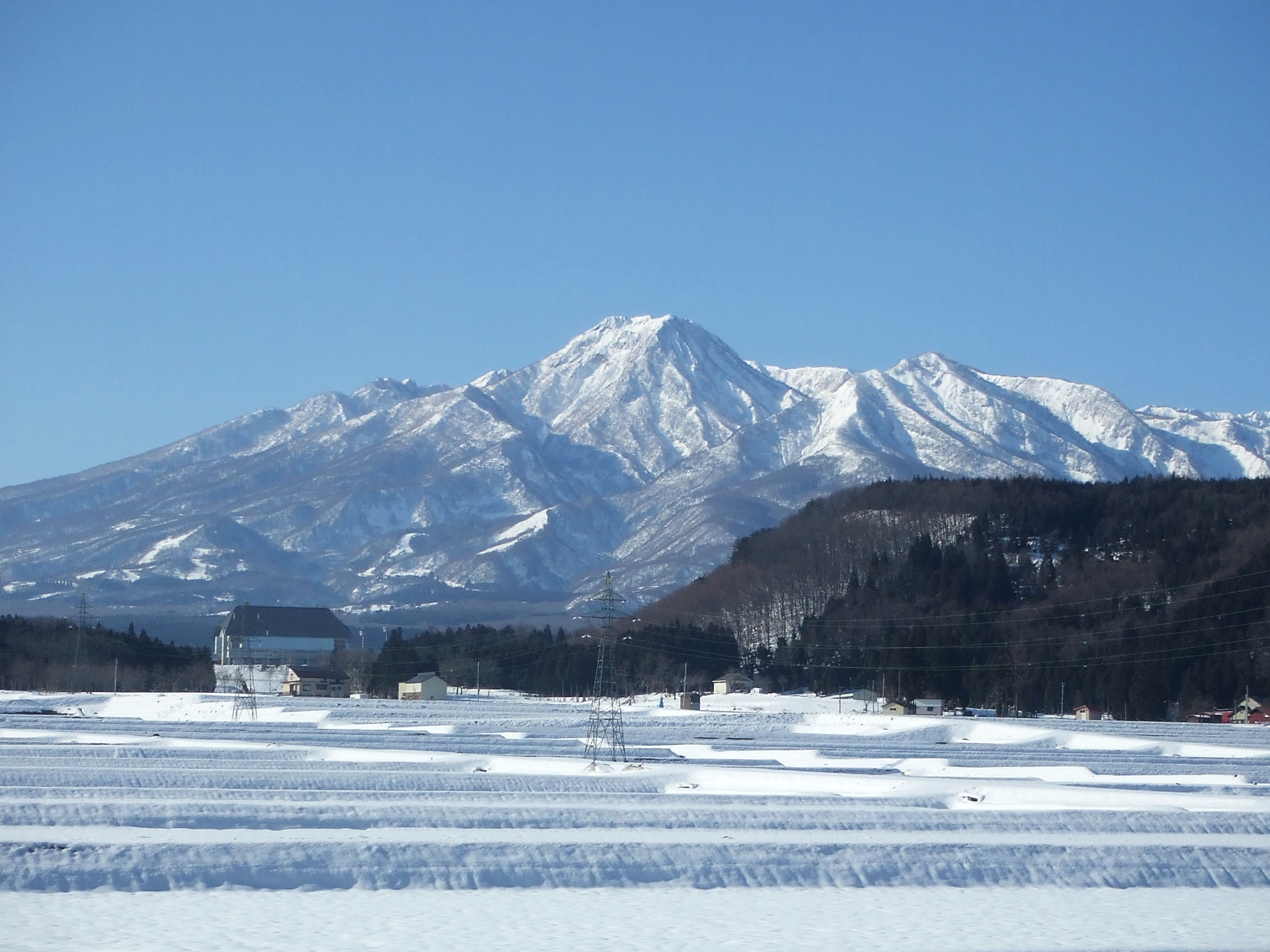
- A view from northeast

Highest point
- Elevation: 2,454 m (8,051 ft)
- Prominence: 439m
- Listing: 100 Famous Japanese Mountains
- Coordinates: 36°53′17.1″N 138°06′59.9″E

Naming
- Native name: 妙高山 (Japanese)
- Pronunciation: Japanese: [mjoːkoːsaɴ]

Geography
- Location within Niigata Prefecture
- Location: Chūbu region, Honshu, Japan
- Parent range: Kubiki Mountains

Geology
- Mountain type: Stratovolcano
- Volcanic arc: Northeastern Japan Arc
- Last eruption: 750 BCE

Climbing
- Easiest route: Hike

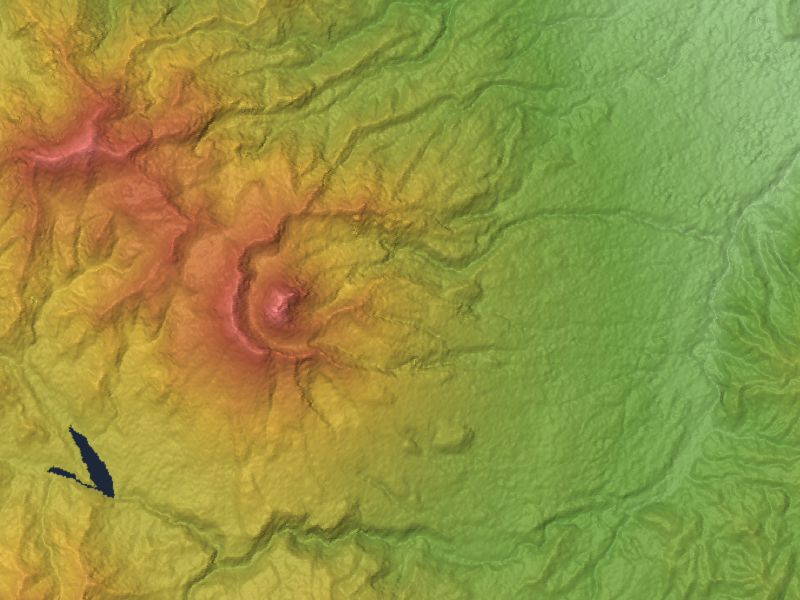
Relief Map

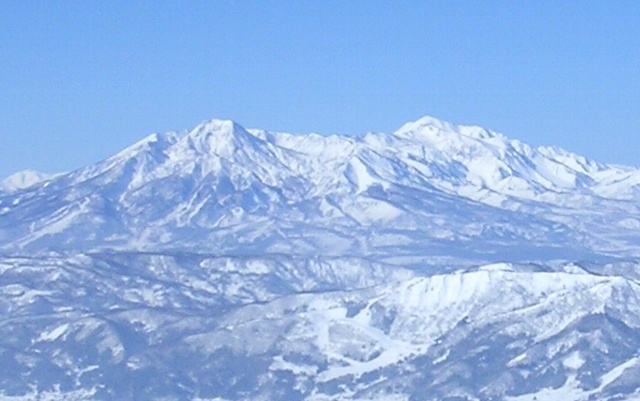
Mount Myōkō (left) and Mount Hiuchi (right) from the Nozawa Onsen ski area

Mount Myōkō (妙高山, Myōkō-san) is an active stratovolcano in Honshu, Japan. It is situated at the southwest of Myōkō city, Niigata Prefecture, and a part of Myōkō-Togakushi Renzan National Park. Mount Myōkō is listed as one of 100 Famous Japanese Mountains, and together with Mount Yahiko (弥彦山, Yahiko-yama), it is well known as the "famous mountain" of Niigata Prefecture.

== Name ==
Echigofuji (越後富士) is another name given to this mountain. Being close to the border with Nagano Prefecture, it is linked to those on the Nagano side as one of the Five Peaks in Hokushin (北信五岳, hokushingogaku). The mountain was originally named Mount Koshinonaka (越の中山, koshinonakayama) but was later changed to Mount Myōkō (名香山, Myōkōsan). This can be also written as 妙高山, in order to make use of two "lucky" characters.

== Geology and geography ==
Mount Myōkō was formed beginning about 300,000 years ago, in a series of eruptions producing a broad spectrum of lava types including basalt, andesite, and dacite. Its maximum height is estimated to have been between 2,800 metres (9,200 ft) and 2,900 metres (9,500 ft), but it presently reaches only 2,454 metres (8,051 ft). Around 19,000 years ago, the top was blown off in a major eruption, forming a 3 km (2 mi) wide caldera. About 6,000 years ago, the central crater developed and assumed its present shape. A lava dome forms the volcano's present summit. The most recent eruptions about 4,300 years ago produced pyroclastic flows down the eastern flanks. Present activity is solfataric from fumaroles near the lava dome where sulfur was once mined.

There are onsen and ski resorts at the foot of the mountain, including Akakura, Suginohara and Ikenotaira.

== Related facts ==
The heavy cruiser Myōkō of the Imperial Japanese Navy and an Aegis destroyer of the Japan Maritime Self-Defense Force are named after this mountain. The JR East train service Myōkō is also named after the mountain.

The mountain appears invariably in school songs of elementary and middle schools in the Jōetsu Region.

In 1990 the Nippon Jamboree, a camping festival, was held on the Myōkō plateau (妙高高原, myōkōkōgen) during which the participants climbed the mountain.

== See also ==
- List of volcanoes in Japan
- List of mountains in Japan
