= 2014 Nagano earthquake =

Earthquake in Japan

Coordinates: 36.641°N 137.888°E

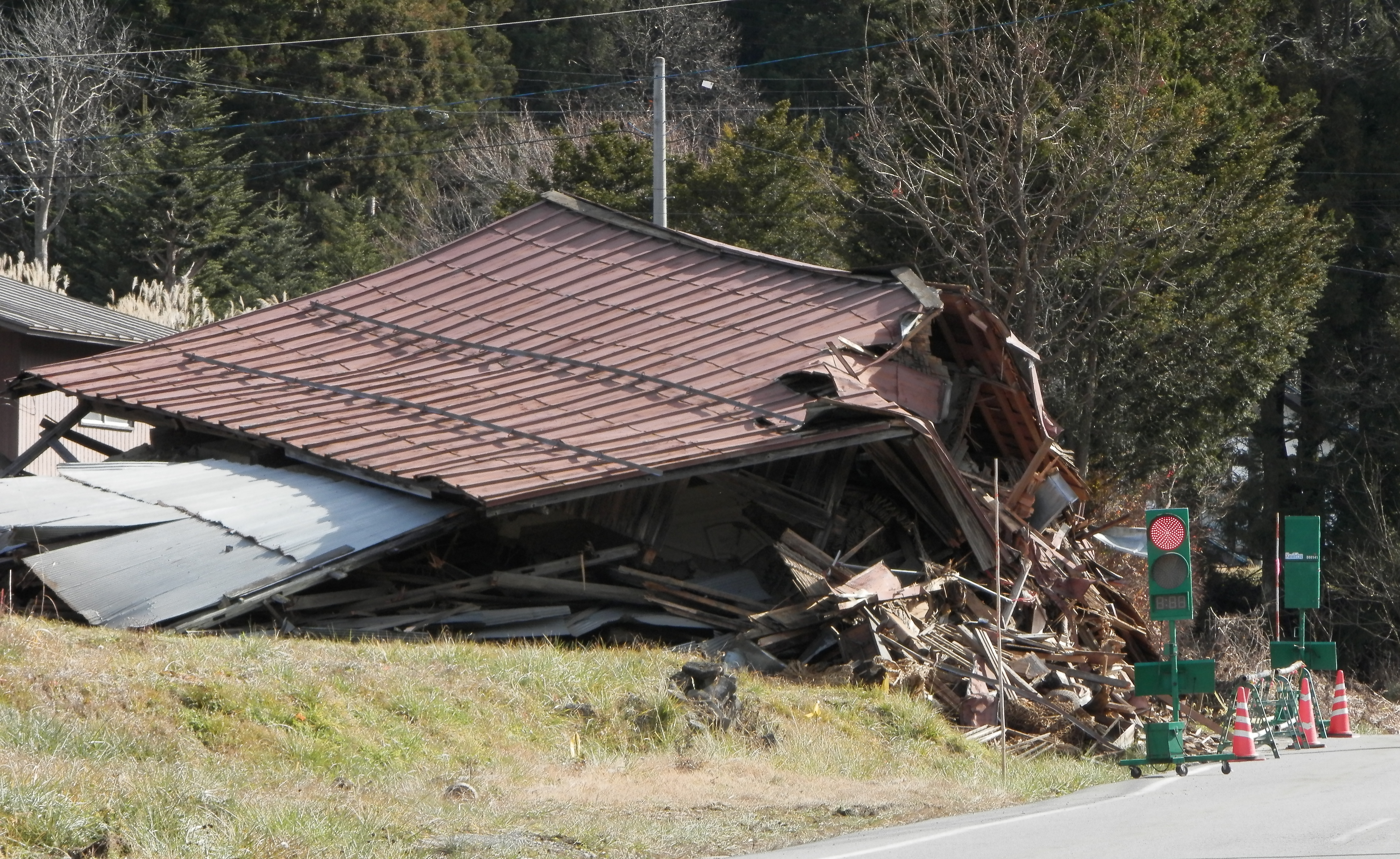

- Location within Nagano Prefecture Location within Japan
- UTC time: 2014-11-22 13:08:18
- ISC event: 611078990
- USGS-ANSS: ComCat
- Local date: November 22, 2014
- Local time: 22:08:18 (UTC+9)
- Magnitude: 6.2 M_{w} (USGS); 6.7 M_{JMA} (JMA)
- Depth: 9.0 km (5.6 mi)
- Fault: Kamishiro fault
- Type: Reverse
- Max. intensity: MMI IX (Violent) JMA 6−
- Casualties: 41 injuries

On November 22, 2014, at 22:08 local time (UTC +9), an earthquake struck southeast of Hakuba, Nagano Prefecture. It had a magnitude of 6.2 M_{w} according to the United States Geological Survey, with a maximum intensity assigned IX (Violent) on the Modified Mercalli intensity scale. According to the Japan Meteorological Agency, it is recorded as 6.7 M_{JMA} and at its peak intensity at Shindo 6 Lower on the Japan Meteorological Agency seismic intensity scale. The earthquake did not result in any deaths, however 41 people sustained mild to severe injuries.

== Earthquake ==
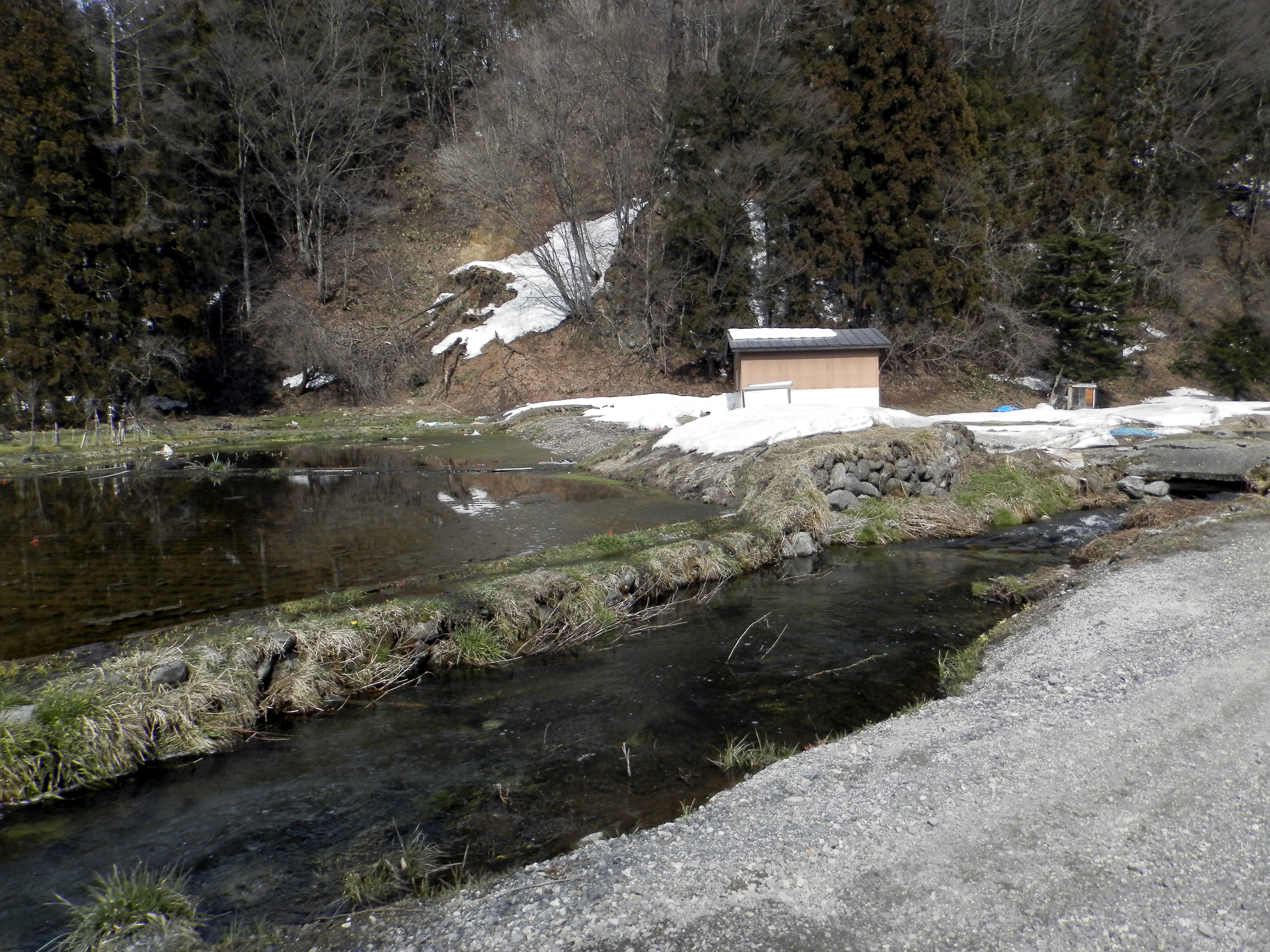
Part of the uplift of the Kamishiro fault in a rice paddy.

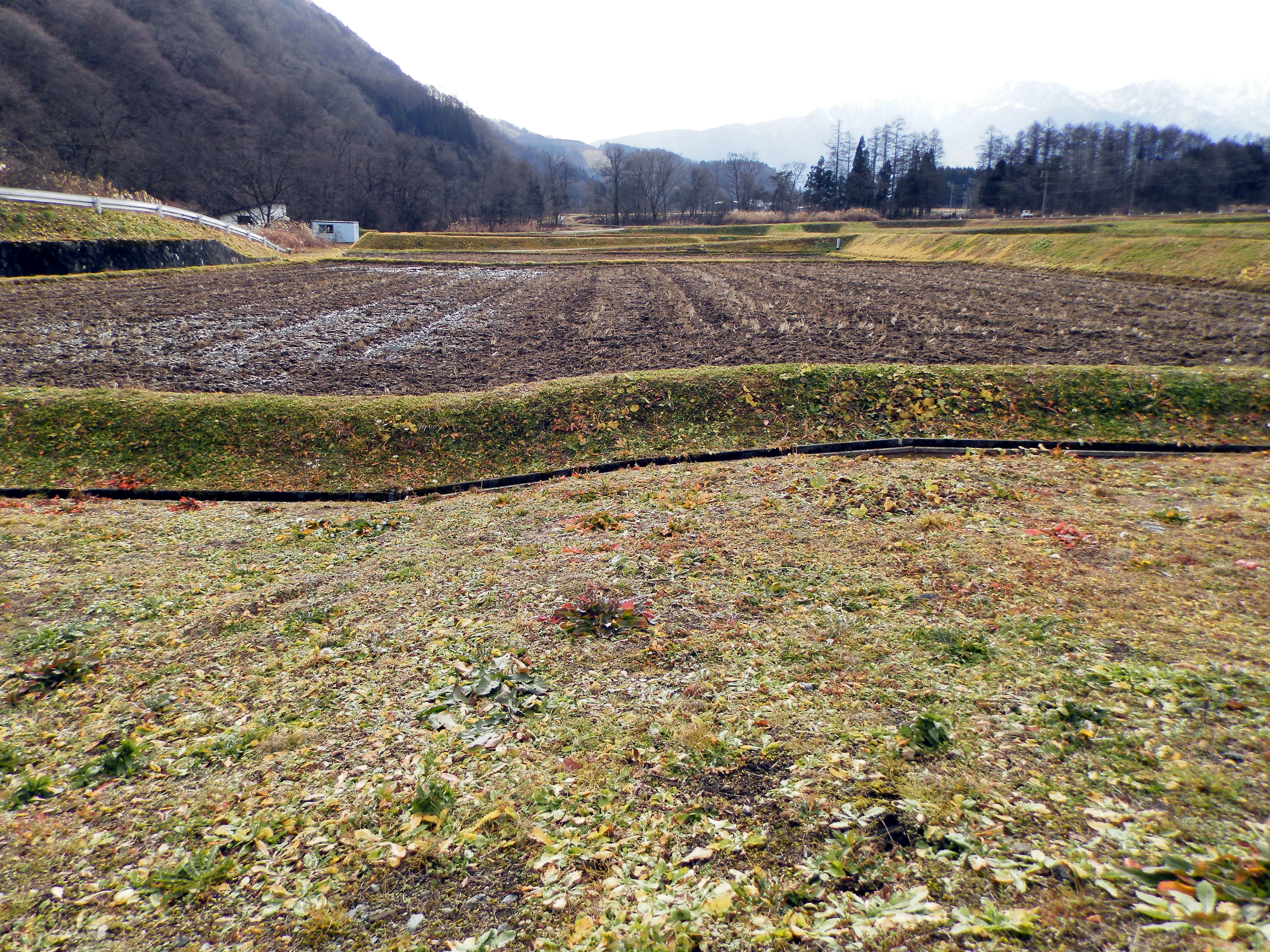
Surface displacement observed in Hakuba

The quake was generated by the movement of the Kamishiro fault. The focal mechanism of which suggested reverse faulting on an eastward-dipping fault extending in the north–south direction. The quake was also had a pressure axis in the west-northwest-east-southeast direction, and is considered to be a shallow earthquake. According to the report of GNSS observations, crustal movements of about 29 cm directing southeast and some subsidence of an estimated 13 cm going the vertical direction were observed at the Hakuba observation point, located in Nagano with the occurrence of the mainshock. In addition, the analysis results from the synthetic aperture radar image according to the Advanced Land Observing Satellite-2 "DAICHI-2", the area of crustal movement spreads across the area of about 30 km east–west and about 30 km north–south centering on the village of Hakuba. In particular, large fluctuations can be seen along the Kamishiro fault to the west of the epicenter of the main earthquake. From these crustal movements, the length of the source fault that caused the slip is estimated to be about 20 km. In at field survey, a surface seismic fault was confirmed in the section of about 9 km from Hakuba Village in Hokujo to Hakuba Village near Kamishiro. In the surrounding areas of Hokujo Shiojima in Hakuba Village located near the west of the epicenter of the mainshock, a surface deformation of the eastern uplift with a vertical displacement of up to about 90 cm was confirmed. The Kamishiro fault, which is part of the Itoigawa-Shizuoka Tectonic Line active fault system, exists near this epicenter area. It is probable that a part of the Kamishiro fault and its northern extension were active in this earthquake.

== Intensity ==
Japan Meteorological Agency seismic intensity by selected location (only locations with Shindo higher than 5 are shown)
Intensity	Prefecture	Location
6-	Nagano	Nagano (city), Togakushi, Kinasa, Otari Village, Ogawa Village, Nakaotarihei, Takafu
5+	Nagano	Toyono, Hakuba, Shinano, Hakoshimizu
5+	Niigata	Nakajo
5−	Niigata	Joetsu, Niigata (city), Itoigawa, Sekikawa, Myoko
5−	Nagano	Shinshushin-Shinmachi, Nakano, Omachi, Toyotsu, Iizuna, Yazaka, Mure,

== Impacts ==
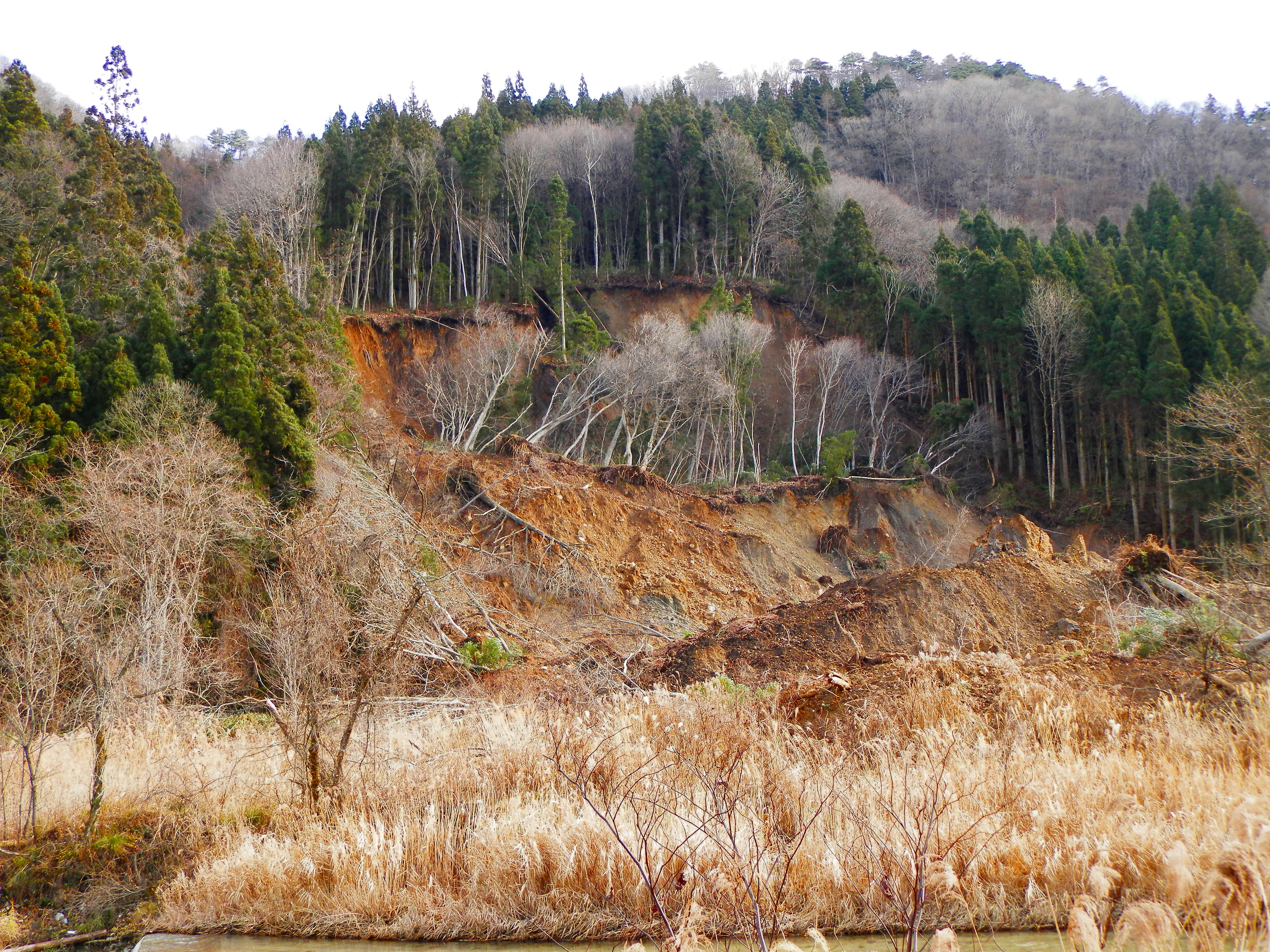
Landslides blocking the Himekawa river

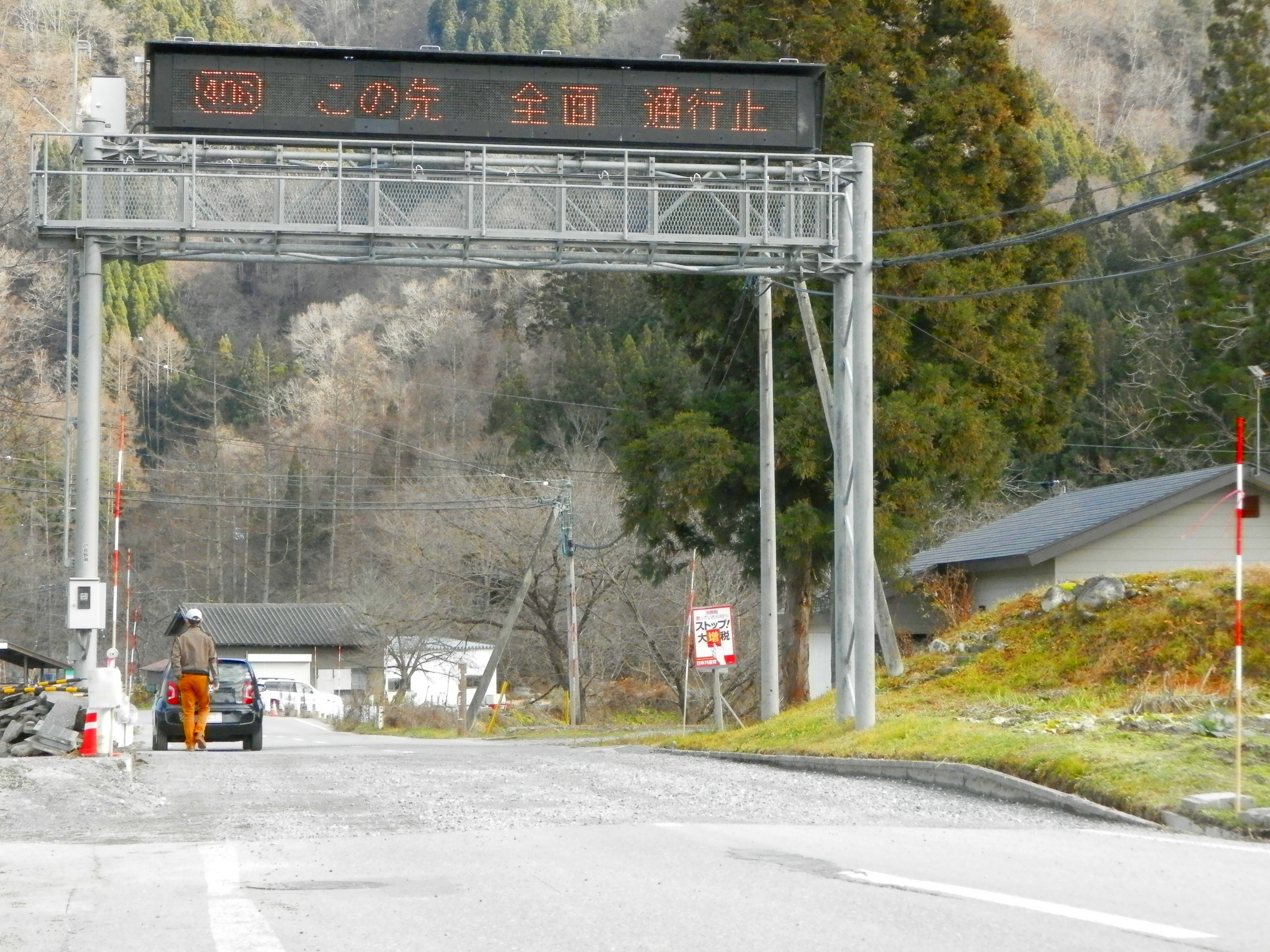
Surface displacement in National Highway 406

=== Damage ===
In the Oide district of the Hakuba village near the epicenter and where most ground ruptures were observed, no damage was observed. Instead, damage was observed in the Horonouchi and Mikkaichiba areas which were apparently 3 kilometers south of the epicenter. Some have speculated that the reason why damage was mostly concentrated in Horonouchi was due to soft ground and sedimentary rock in the area, but some speculate that it was due to its location between complex displacement zones.

=== Evacuation and temporary housing ===
On November 23, an evacuation advisory was held for the town of Otari for 69 people from 31 households due to the mass damage and difficulties that were caused by the earthquake. By November 28, 81 people in 40 households as well as 258 people from 110 households were evacuated.

In Hakuba, it was decided to build about 35 temporary housing units for the people that were affected. As of mid-December, more than 90 people were living in secondary evacuation facilities such as accommodation facilities due to damage to their houses. Of these, 76 people are scheduled to move into 33 households, targeting residents who have been certified as completely or partially destroyed and those who have been instructed to evacuate due to landslides. The village is considering renting private housing when the number of units is insufficient. The village of Otari however, had no plans of making new temporary housing for the residents. Instead they planned to rebuild and renew existing houses that were severely damaged and destroyed.

=== Electricity ===
According to the Chubu Electric power, the main electric supplier of the Chubu region, 1,760 households lost power and reduced to 180 units by 11 o'clock. The Himekawa second power plant and hydroelectric power plant, as well as the Minaminomata power plant on the other hand, was forced to shut down.

=== Water supply ===
According to the Nagano Prefecture Disaster Countermeasures Headquarters, water outages occurred in about 420 households in Nagano City, 270 households in Hakuba, 180 households in Otari and about 20 houses in Omachi. A day after the earthquake water outages also occurred in Ogawa and Iiyama but were immediately restored.

=== Transportation ===
Traffic disturbances occurred due to landslides in Hakuba, Hokujo, Nitta and Otari. However, by December 3, most were lifted due to easy clearance or roads. Some roads most notably, Highway No. 406, were still closed due to assessment of displacement and liquefaction.

== See also ==
- 1984 Nagano earthquake
- List of earthquakes in 2014
- List of earthquakes in Japan
