= Ōoka, Nagano =

Dissolved municipality in Nagano prefecture, Japan

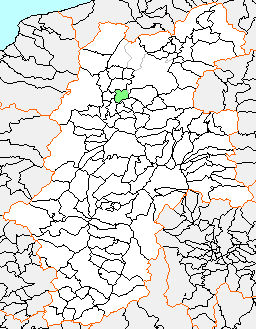
Location of Ōoka in Nagano Prefecture

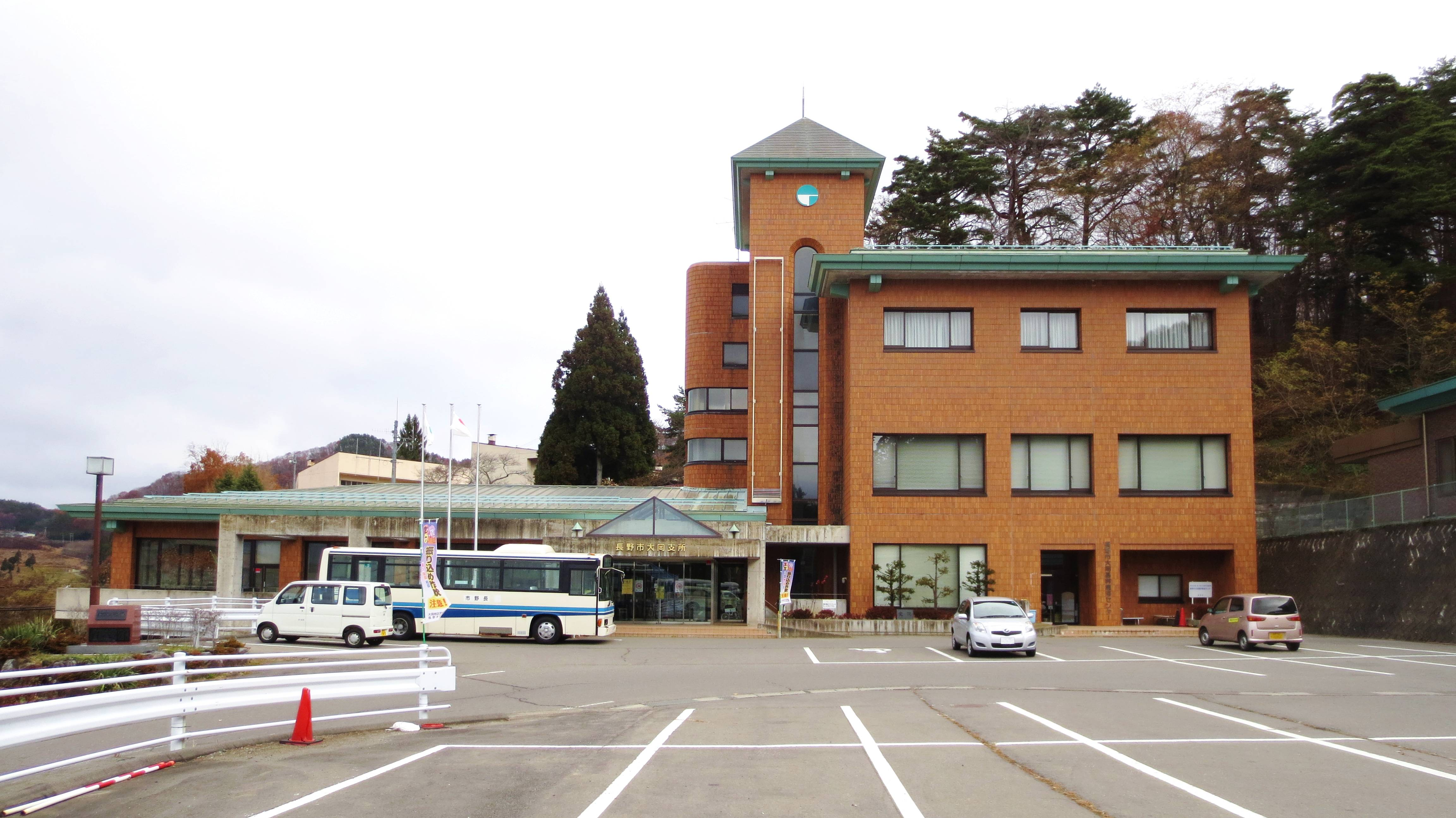
former Ōoka village hall

Ōoka (大岡村, Ōoka-mura) was a village located in Sarashina District, Nagano Prefecture, Japan.

As of 2003, the village had an estimated population of 1,467 and a density of 31.99 persons per km^{2}. The total area was 45.86 km^{2}.

On January 1, 2005, Ōoka, along with the town of Toyono, and the villages of Togakushi and Kinasa (all from Kamiminochi District), was merged into the expanded city of Nagano.
