= Sarashina District, Nagano =

Former district in Nagano prefecture, Japan

Sarashina (更級郡, Sarashina-gun) was a district located in Nagano Prefecture, Japan.

As of 2003, the district had an estimated population of 1,467 with a density of 31.99 persons per km^{2}. The total area was 45.86 km^{2}.

== Municipalities ==
Prior to its dissolution, the district consisted of only one village:

- Ōoka (Note: Classified as a village.)

== History ==
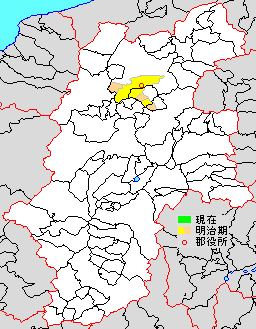
Map showing original extent of Sarashina District in Nagano Prefecture: * yellow - areas formerly within the district borders during the early Meiji period

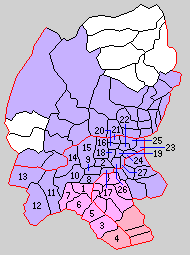
Colored areas are in this district.

=== District Timeline ===
- January 14, 1879 - Due to the district, ward, town and village status enforcement, the district seat was located at the village of Shiozaki.
- April 1, 1889 - Prior to the city, town, and village status enforcement, Sarashina District created the town of Inariyama and 26 villages. (1 town, 26 villages)
- May 17, 1890
  - The village of Kamihyoho was renamed as the village of Sasai.
  - The village of Okada was renamed as the village to Kyowa.
- May 24, 1890 - The village of Goheigawa was renamed as the village to Sakae.
- October 14, 1892 (1 town, 28 villages)
  - The village of Rikiishi broke off from the village of Kamiyamada.
  - The village of Nichihara broke off from the village of Shinsara.
- April 21, 1914 - The village of Fuse was elevated to town status and changed its name to Shinonoi. (2 towns, 27 villages)

The villages of Sasai and Imazato were merged to create the village of Kawanakajima (2 towns, 26 villages)

- April 1, 1928 - The town of Shinonoi, and the village of Sakae were merged to create the town of Shinonoi. (2 towns, 25 villages)
- November 3, 1949 - The village of Kamiyamada was elevated to town status. (3 towns, 24 villages)
- July 1, 1950 - The town of Shinonoi, and the village of Tofukuji and Senryu were merged to create the town of Shinonoi. (3 towns, 22 villages)
- July 1, 1954 - The town of Shinonoi, and the village of Kyowa were merged to create the town of Shinonoi. (3 towns, 21 villages)
- January 1, 1955 - The villages of Inazato, Mashima, Kojimata, and Aokijima were merged to create the village of Sarakita. (3 towns, 20 villages)
- March 31, 1955 - The villages of Nichihara and Shinsara were merged with the town of Shin (in Kamiminochi District) to create the town of Shinshushin (in Kamiminochi District). (3 towns, 18 villages)
- April 1, 1955 (3 towns, 11 villages)
  - The villages of Nakatsu and Gozu were merged to create the village of Showa.
  - The town of Inariyama, and the village of Kuwahara were merged to create the town of Inariyamakuwahara.
  - The village of Shinsato was merged into the town of Shinonoi.
  - The village of Nishiterao was merged with the town of Matsushiro, and the villages of Toyosaka and Terao (all from Hanishina District) to create the town of Matsushiro (in Hanishina District).
  - The village of Sarashina was merged with the town of Togura (from Hanishina District) to create the town of Togura (in Hanishina District).
- July 1, 1955 - The town of Kamiyamada, and the village of Rikiishi were merged to create the town of Kamiyamada.
- December 1, 1955 - The town of Inariyamakuwahara was renamed as the town to Inariyama.
- June 1, 1956 - The villages of Nobuta and Sarafu were merged to create the village of Shinsara. (3 towns, 9 villages)
- September 30, 1956 (4 towns, 6 villages)
  - The village of Makisato broke off and was merged each into the village of Ōoka and the town of Shinshushin (in Kamiminochi District), respectively.
  - The villages of Kawanakajima and Showa were merged to create the town of Kawanakajima.
- May 1, 1959 - The town of Shinonoi and the village of Shiozaki were merged to create the city of Shinonoi. (3 towns, 5 villages)
- June 1, 1959 - The town of Inariyama, and the village of Yahata were merged with the towns of Yashiro and Hanimana to create the city of Koshoku. (2 towns, 4 villages)
- April 1, 1960 - The village of Murakami merged into the town of Sakaki in Hanishina District. (2 towns, 3 villages)
- October 16, 1966 - The town of Kawanakajima and the villages of Shinsara and Sarakita were merged with the cities of Nagano and Shinonoi, the town of Matsushiro (from Hanishina District), the town of Wakaho (from Kamitakai District), and the village of Nananikai (from Kamiminochi District) to create the city of Nagano. (1 town, 1 village)

=== Recent mergers ===
- September 1, 2003 - The town of Kamiyamada was merged with the village of Togura (from Hanishina District) and the city of Koshoku to create the city of Chikuma. (1 village)
- January 1, 2005 - The village of Ōoka, along with the town of Toyono, and the villages of Togakushi and Kinasa (all from Kamiminochi District), was merged into the expanded city of Nagano. Therefore, Sarashina District was dissolved as a result of this merger.

== See also ==
- List of dissolved districts of Japan
