= Shinshūshinmachi, Nagano =

Shinshūshinmachi 信州新町
- Former municipality
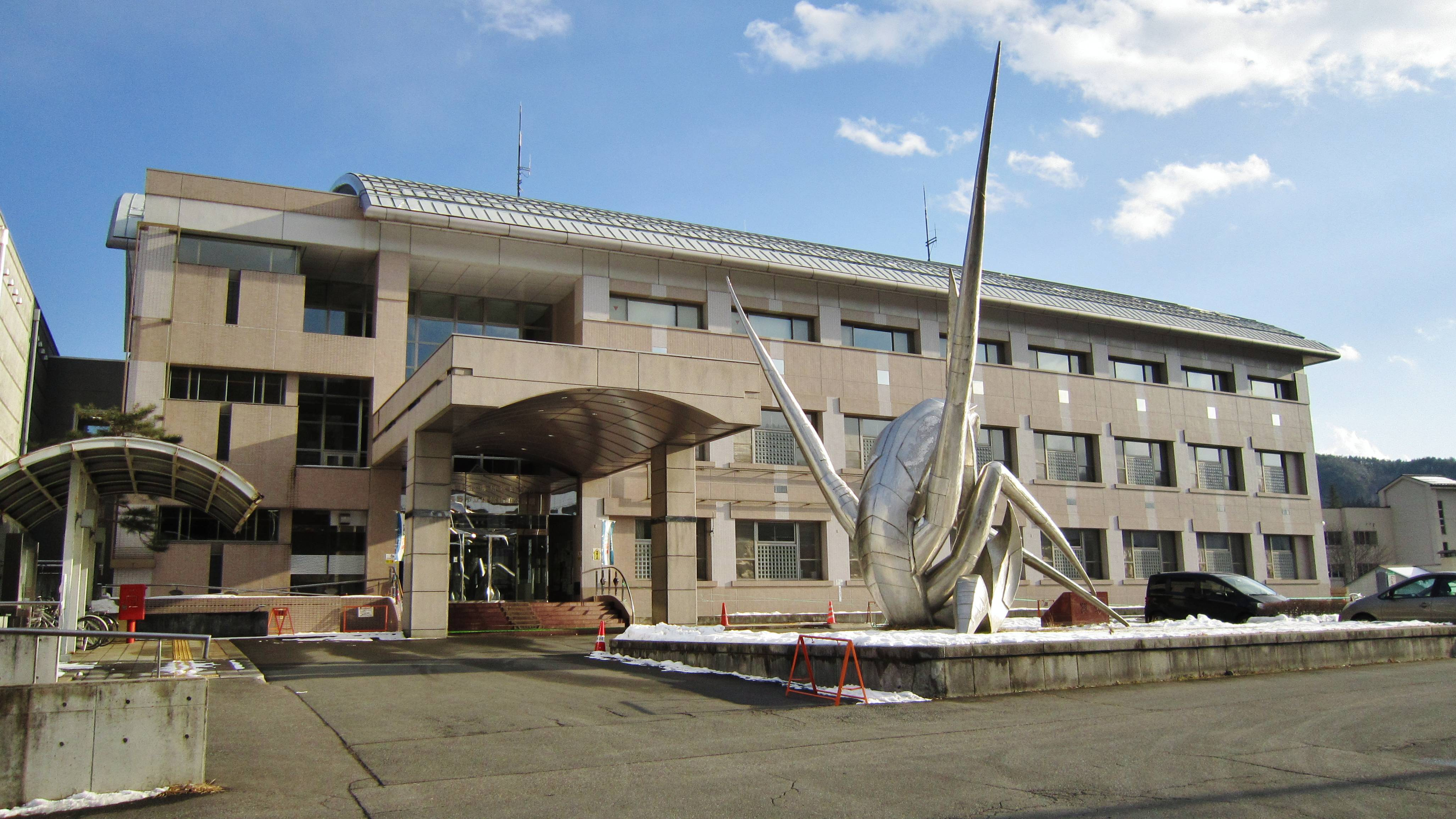
- Former Shinshūshinmachi town hall

- Location of Shinshūshinmachi in Nagano Prefecture

- Location in Japan
- Coordinates: 36°34′N 138°0′E
- Country: Japan
- Region: Chūbu
- Prefecture: Nagano Prefecture
- District: Kamiminochi
- Merged: 1 January 2010 (now part of Nagano)

Area
  - Total: 70.73 km^{2} (27.31 sq mi)

Population (1 May 2008)
  - Total: 5,181
  - Density: 73.3/km^{2} (190/sq mi)
- Time zone: UTC+09:00 (JST)

Shinshūshinmachi (信州新町, Shinshū-shinmachi) was a town located in Kamiminochi District, Nagano Prefecture, Japan.

== Population ==
As of 2003, the town had an estimated population of 5,762 and a density of 81.46 persons per km^{2}. The total area was 70.73 km^{2}.

== History ==
On January 1, 2010, Shinshūshinmachi, along with the village of Nakajō (also from Kamiminochi District), was merged into the expanded city of Nagano.
