= Nakajō, Nagano =

Former village in Japan

Coordinates: 36°37′N 138°2′E

location map of former Nakajō village

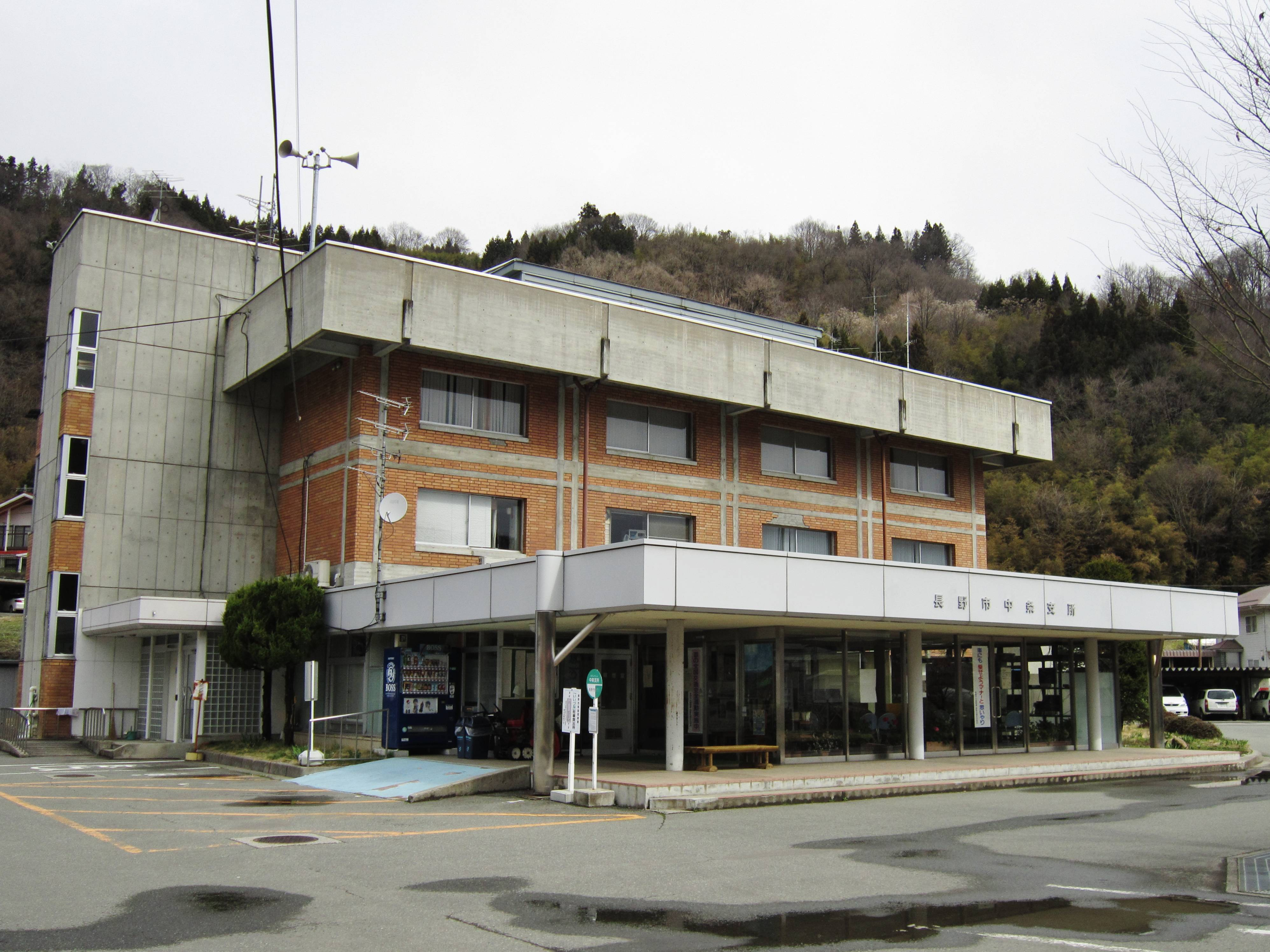
former Nakajō village hall

Nakajō (中条村, Nakajō-mura) was a village located in Kamiminochi District, Nagano Prefecture, Japan.

As of 2003, the village had an estimated population of 2,742 and a population density of 82.37 persons per km^{2}. The total area was 33.29 km^{2}. This village lies about 20 km west of Nagano City along route 19. Its landscape is surrounded by dense forests and mountains.

On January 1, 2010, Nakajō, along with the town of Shinshūshinmachi (also from Kamiminochi District), was merged into the expanded city of Nagano.

The village's landmark, Mt. Mushikura (虫倉山), is the centerpiece of local lore.
