= Samizu, Nagano =

Dissolved municipality in Nagano prefecture, Japan

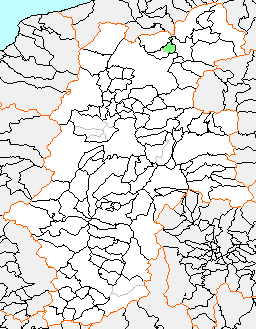
Map of Samizu, Nagano

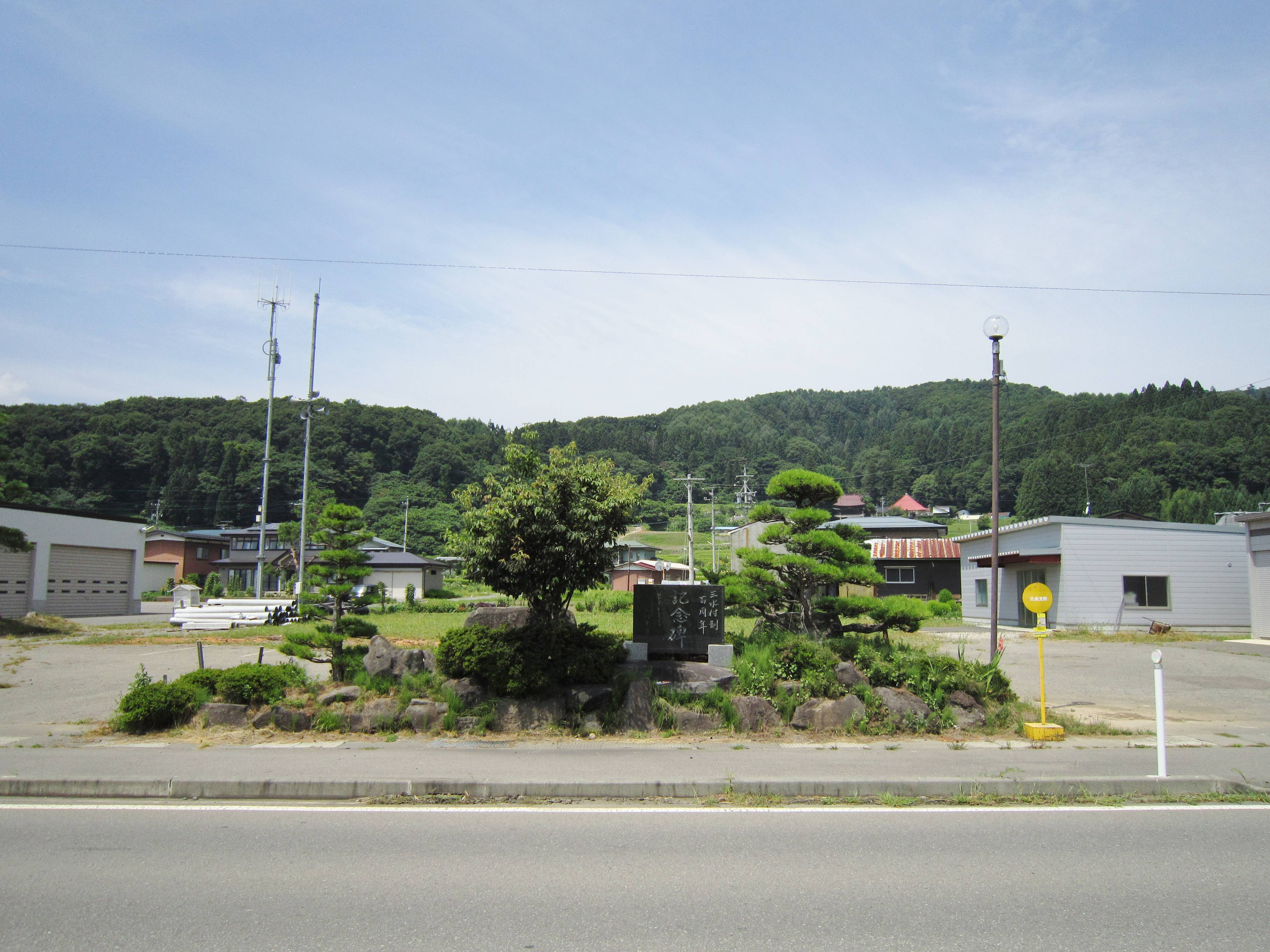
Monument marking location of former Samizu village hall

Samizu (三水村, Samizu-mura) was a village located in Kamiminochi District, Nagano Prefecture, Japan.

== Population ==
As of 2003, the village had an estimated population of 5,395 and a density of 152.14 persons per km^{2}. The total area was 35.46 km^{2}.

== History ==
On October 1, 2005, Samizu, along with the village of Mure (also from Kamiminochi District), was merged to create the town of Iizuna.
