= Togakushi, Nagano =

Dissolved municipality in Nagano prefecture, Japan

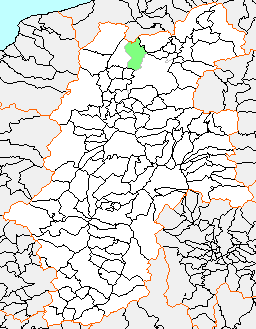
Location of Togakushi in Nagano Prefecture

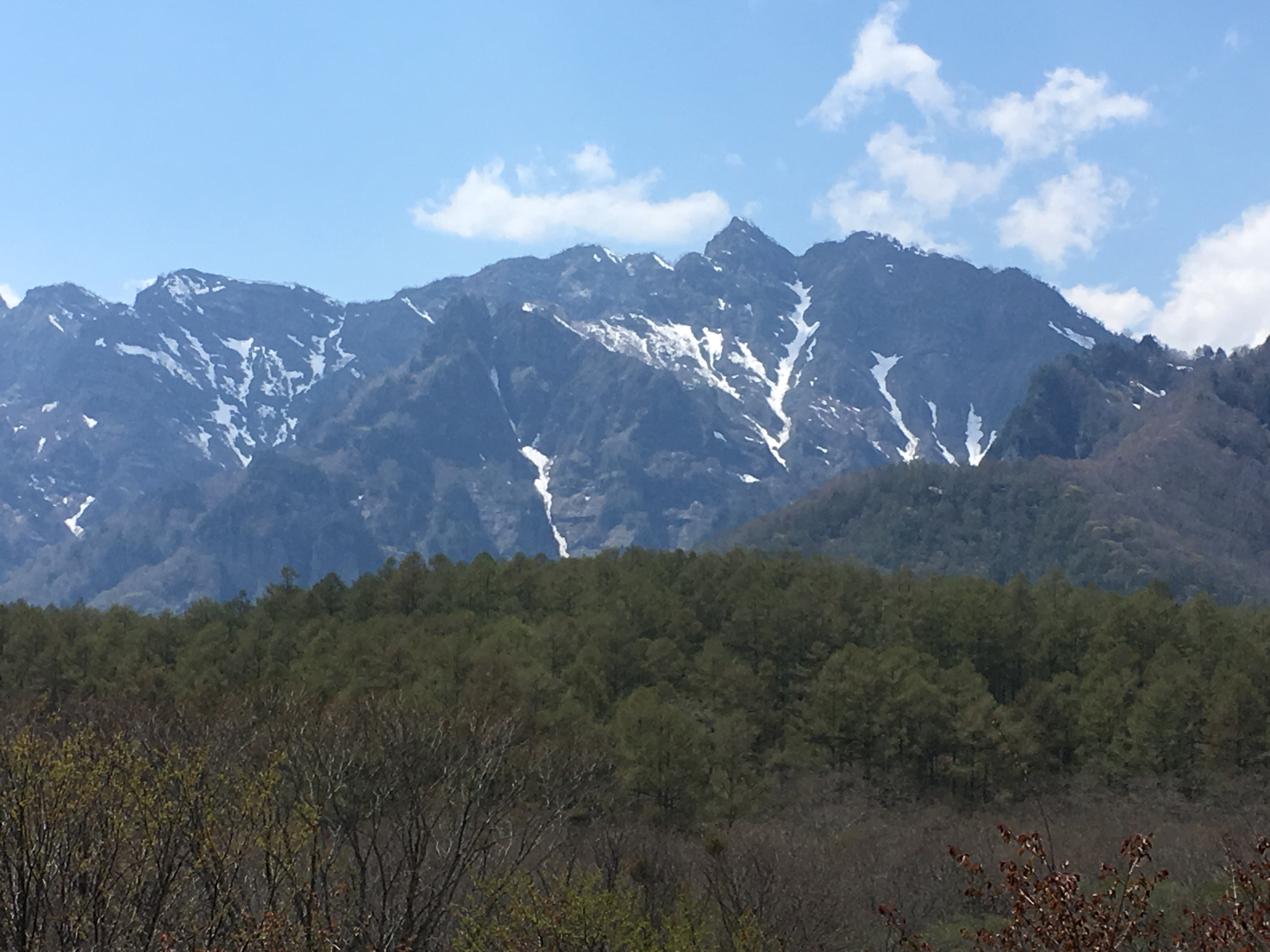
Mount Togakushi in Nagano City

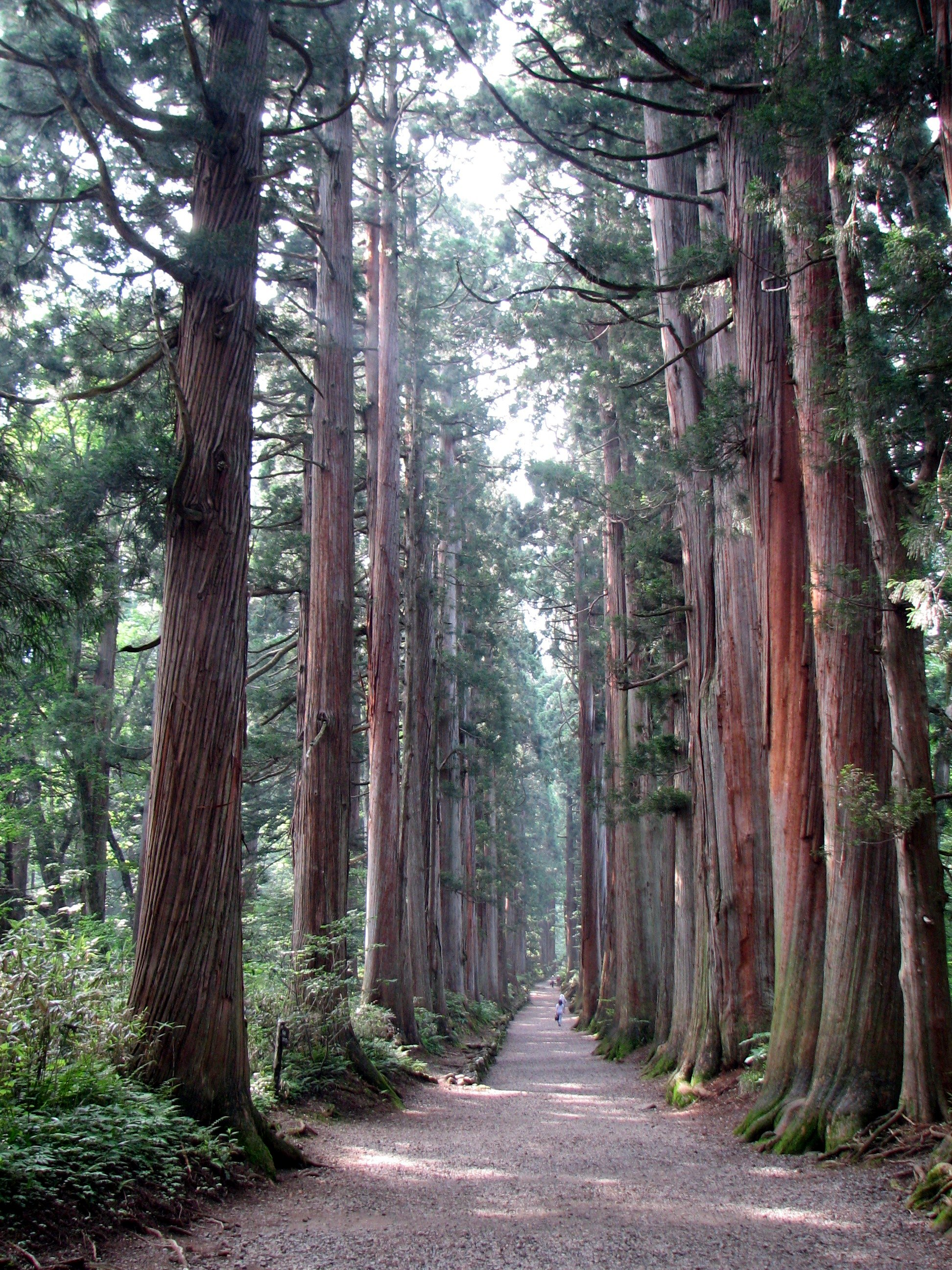
17th century-planted cedar tree-lined path to Togakushi shrine

Togakushi (戸隠村, Togakushi-mura) was a village located in the mountainous Kamiminochi District, Nagano Prefecture, Japan.

== Geography ==
Part of Togakushi is located in Myōkō-Togakushi Renzan National Park, and includes Mount Takatsuma (2353m), the highest peak in the Togakushi Mountain Range and one of the 100 Famous Japanese Mountains, and Mount Togakushi (1904m), one of the 200 most famous mountains in Japan (日本に百名山), and one of the 100 most famous mountains in Nagano (信州百名山). One of Japan's largest campgrounds is found in Togakushi.

== History ==
The village was established on April 1, 1889, by merging Togakushi and Toyooka. On January 1, 2005, Togakushi, along with the village of Ōoka (from Sarashina District), the town of Toyono, and the village of Kinasa (all from Kamiminochi District), was merged into the expanded city of Nagano.

Togakushi was formerly known as the village of Togakure which some consider to be the birthplace of Togakure Ryu Ninpo by its founder Daisuke Nishina (Togakure).

In 2015, a branch of the Kitano Museum of Art opened in Togakushi.

== Transportation ==
Togakushi, Myoko-Togakushi renzan National Park, Togakushi Campground, and Togakushi Shrine are all accessible by local bus, with service provided by Alpico Kōtsū, from Nagano Station.

To make the steep climb from the Nagano Basin (Zenkoji Daira), the plain in which Nagano City is located, to the mountains of Togakushi, from Nagano Station, the bus route travels the Asagawa Loop Line. The loop line was built in preparations for the 1998 Winter Olympics, to the Iizuna Kogen Ski Area. Along the way the bus passes the Spiral, the site of bobsleigh and luge competitions for the Winter Olympics. The last stops of the bus are in the Togakushi area.

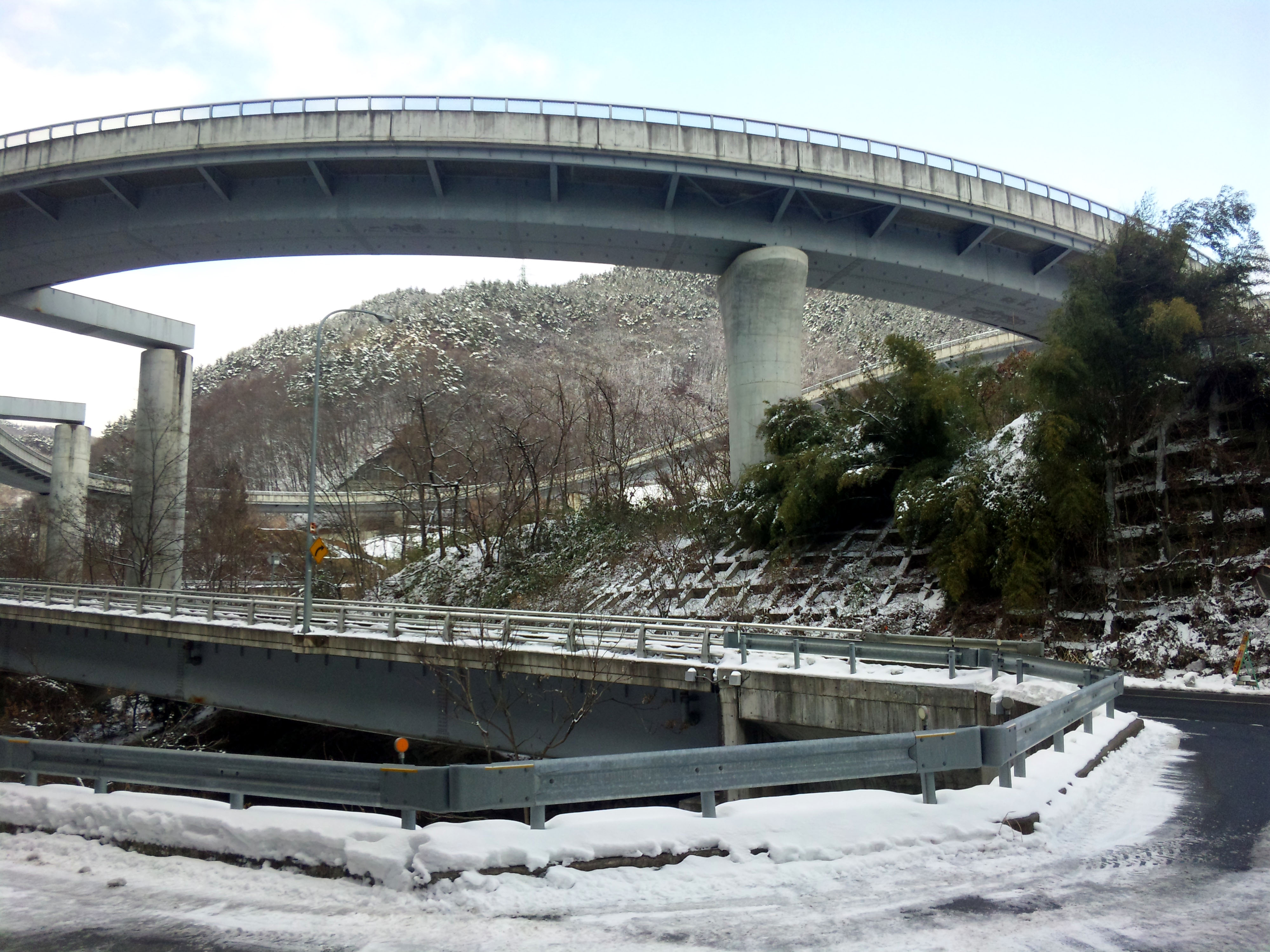
Asagawa Loop Line to Iizuna Kogen Ski Area built in preparations for the Games

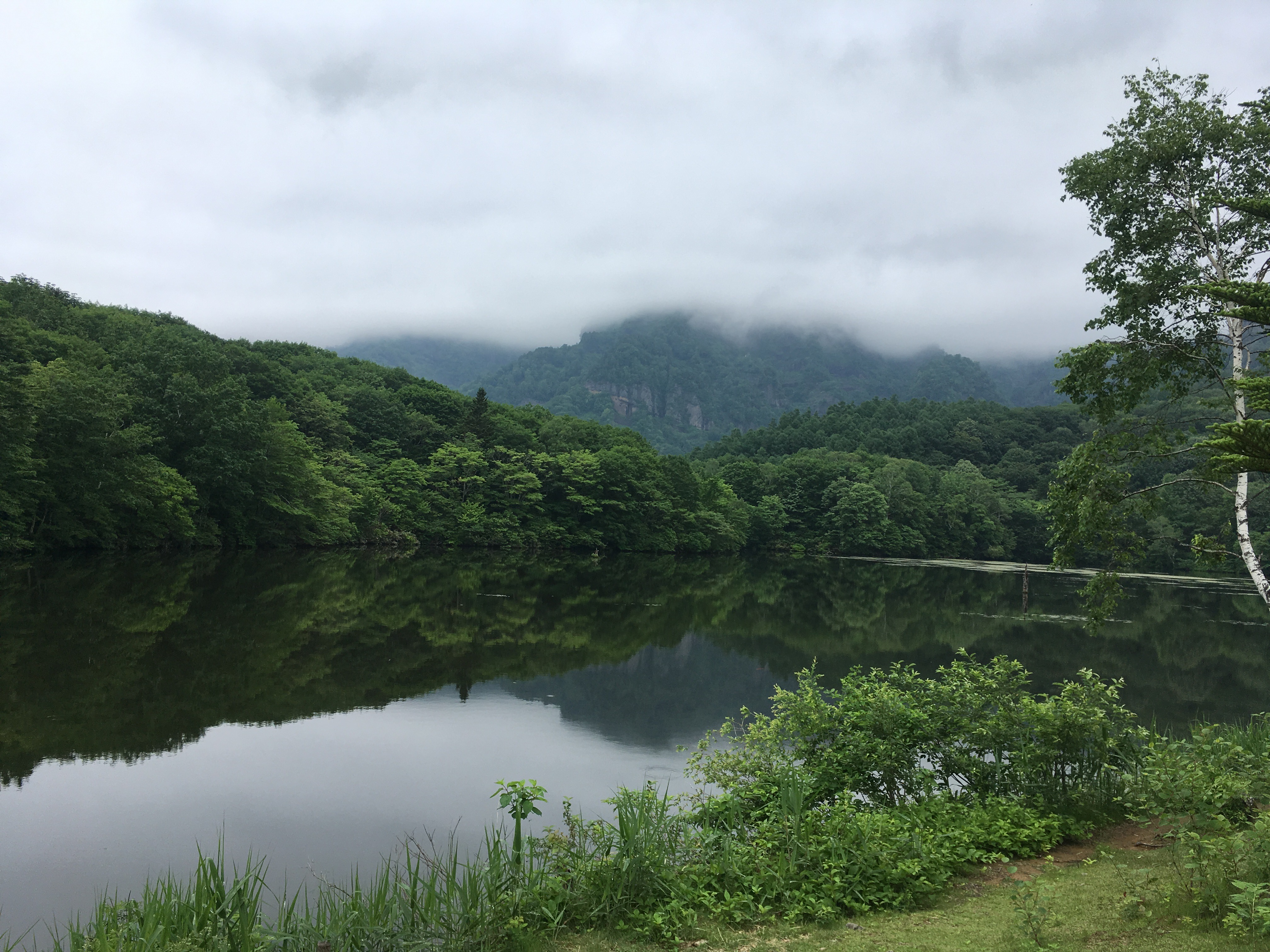
Kagami-ike Pond, in Togakushi, Nagano 2019.

== Demographics ==
As of 2015, the former village had an estimated population of 3,499 and a density of 26.36 persons per km^{2}. The total area was 132.76 km^{2}.

Year	Togakushi
1947	10,205
1950	10,281
1955	9,697
1960	8,709
1965	7,547
1970	6,475
1975	6,225
1980	6,074
1985	5,866
1990	5,608
1995	5,218
2000	4,938
2005	4,467
2010	3,986
2015	3,499

== See also ==
- Mount Takatsuma
- Mount Togakushi
- Togakushi Shrine
