= Hanishina District, Nagano =

District in Nagano prefecture, Japan

Hanishina (埴科郡, Hanishina-gun) is a district located in Nagano Prefecture, Japan.

As of December 1, 2005, the district has an estimated population of 16,742 with a density of 312.12 persons per km^{2}. The total area is 53.64 km^{2}.

== Municipalities ==
The district consists of one town:

- Sakaki (Note: Classified as a town.)

== History ==
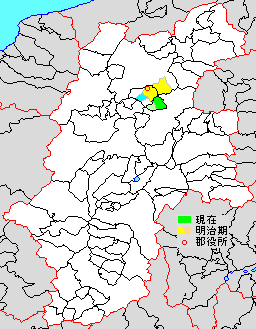
Map showing original extent of Hanishina District in Nagano Prefecture: * yellow - areas formerly within the district borders during the early Meiji period: 1. Sakaki-machi

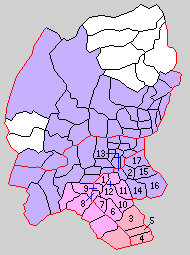
Colored areas are in this district.

=== Recent mergers ===
- On September 1, 2003 - The town of Togura was merged with the town of Kamiyamada (from Sarashina District) and the city of Koshoku to form the new city of Chikuma.
