= Kitano Museum of Art =

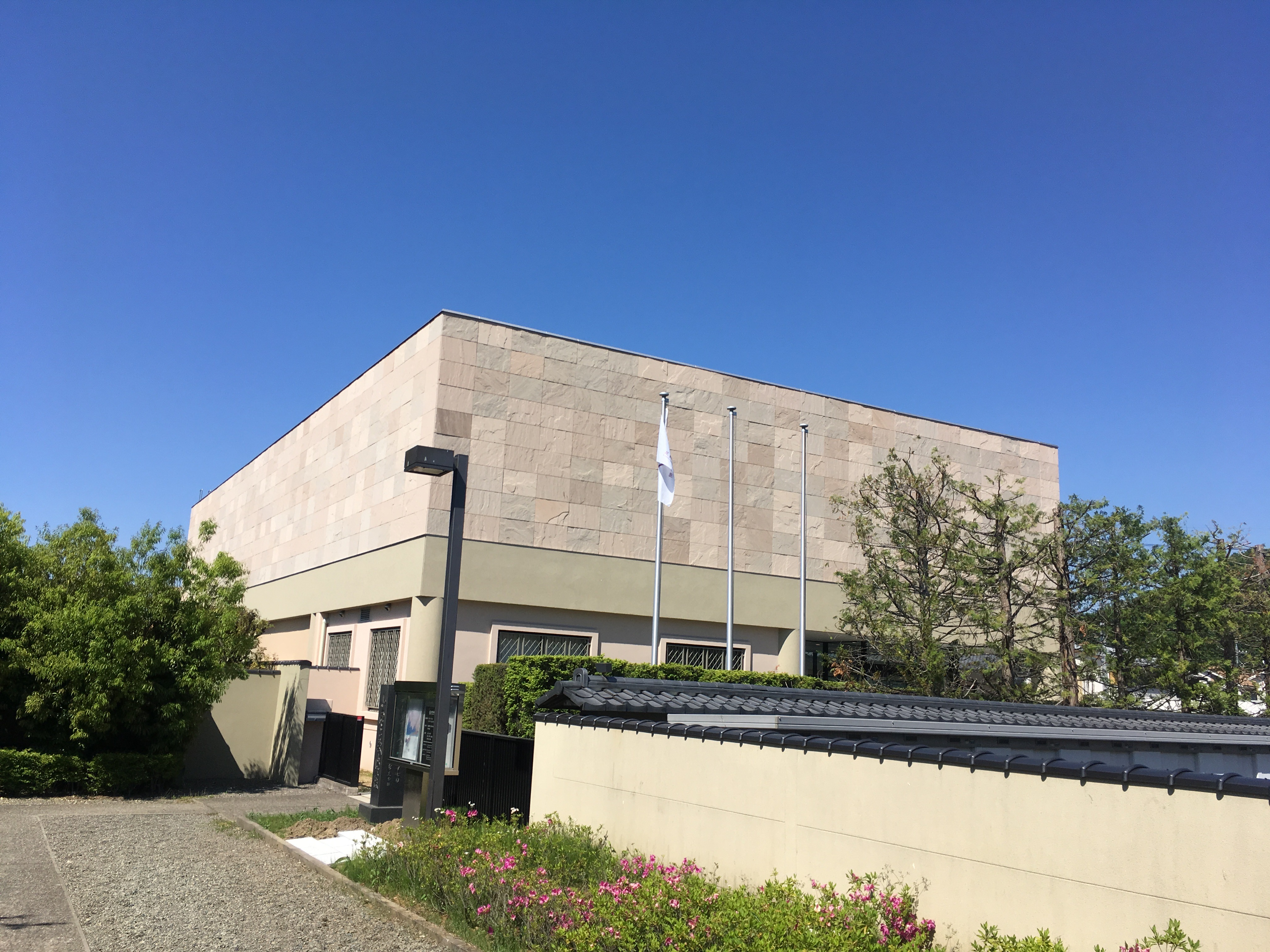
- Kitano Art Museum, Nagano (city)

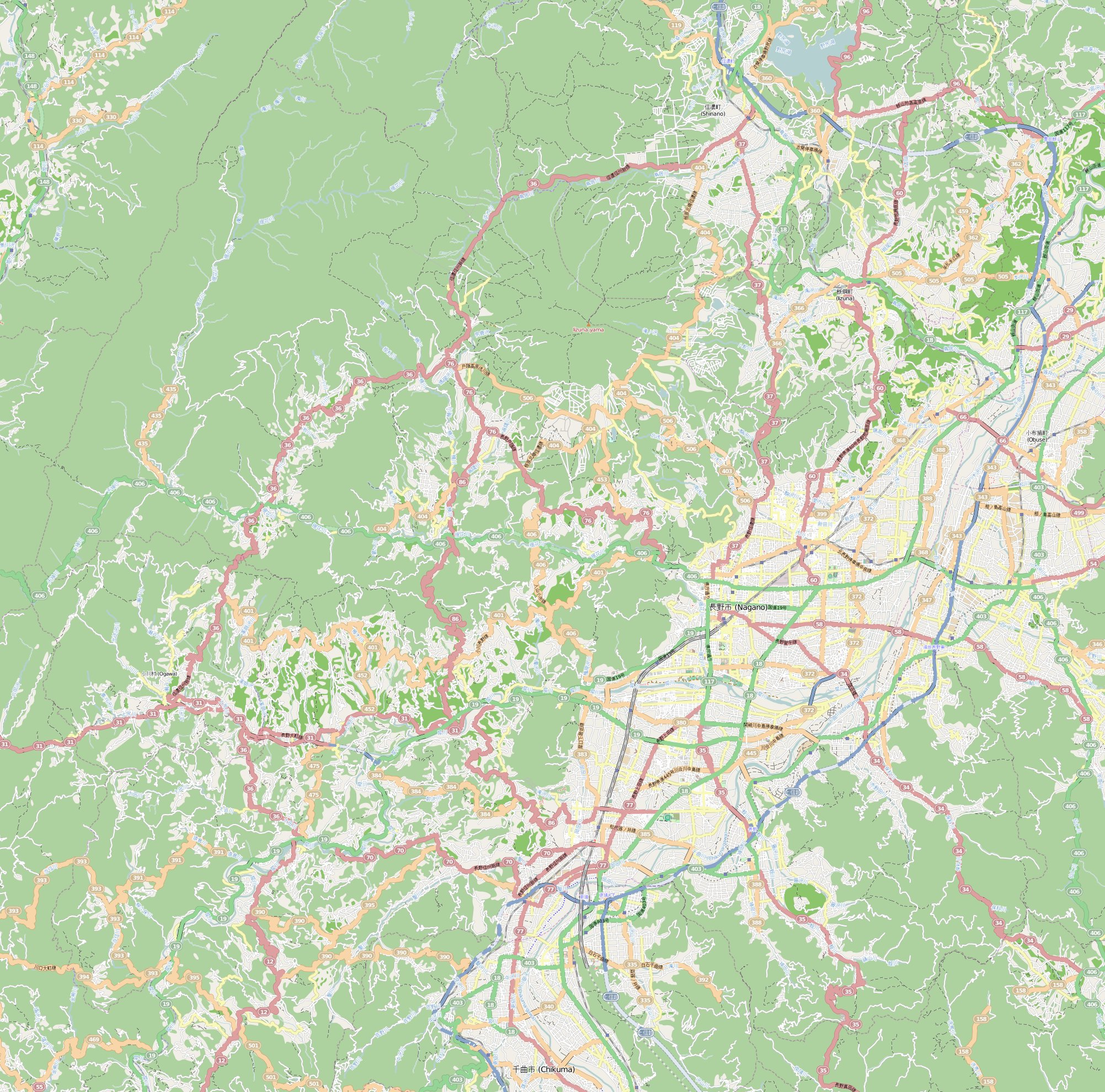
- Location within Nagano, Nagano
- Established: 1968
- Location: 7963-2 Wakahowatauchi Nagano Nagano 381-0101 Japan
- Coordinates: 36.617722°N 138.252778°E
- Type: Art museum
- Website: kitano-museum.or.jp/en/

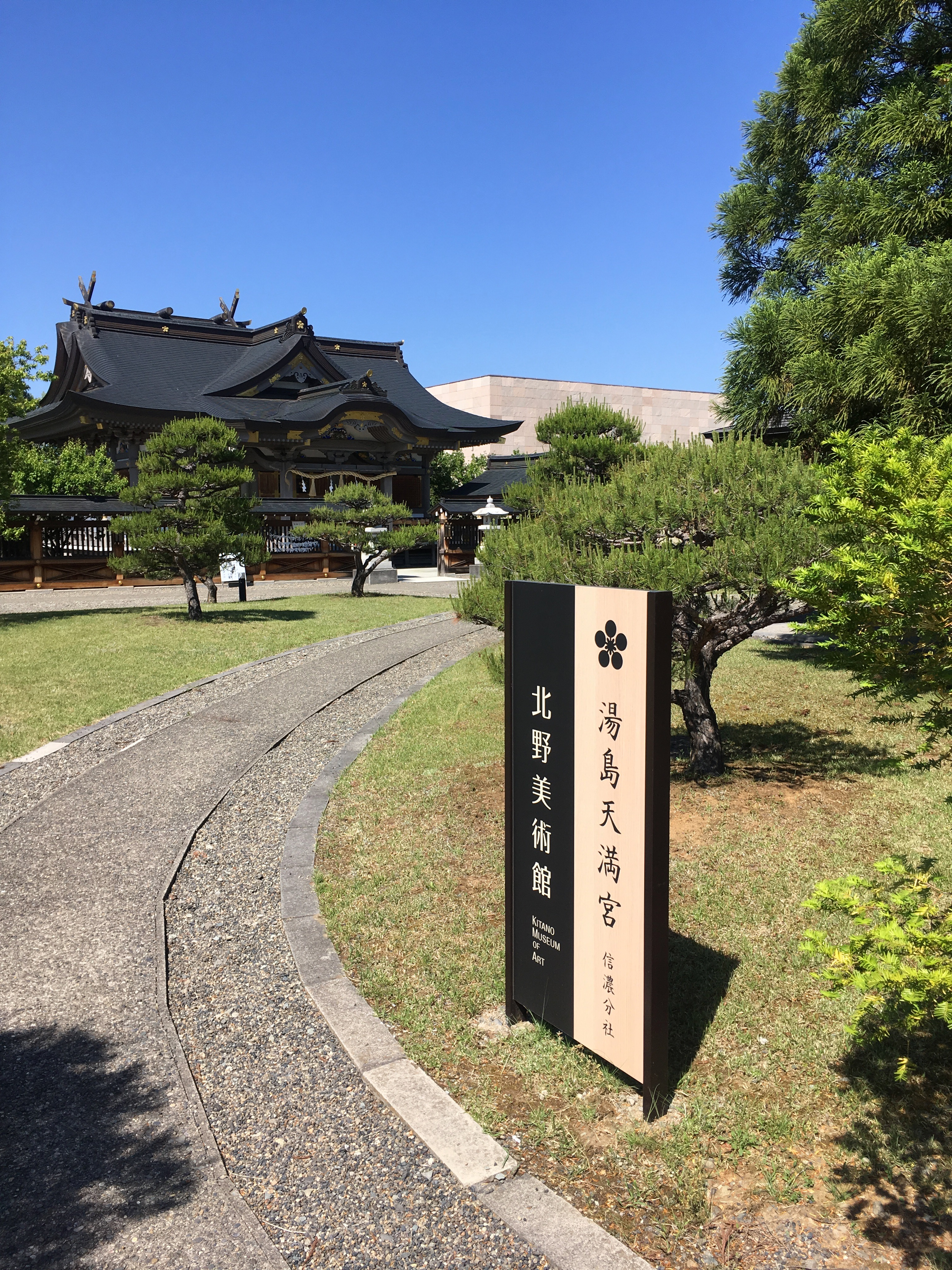
The entrance to Yushimatenmangu Shrine and Kitano Museum of Art.

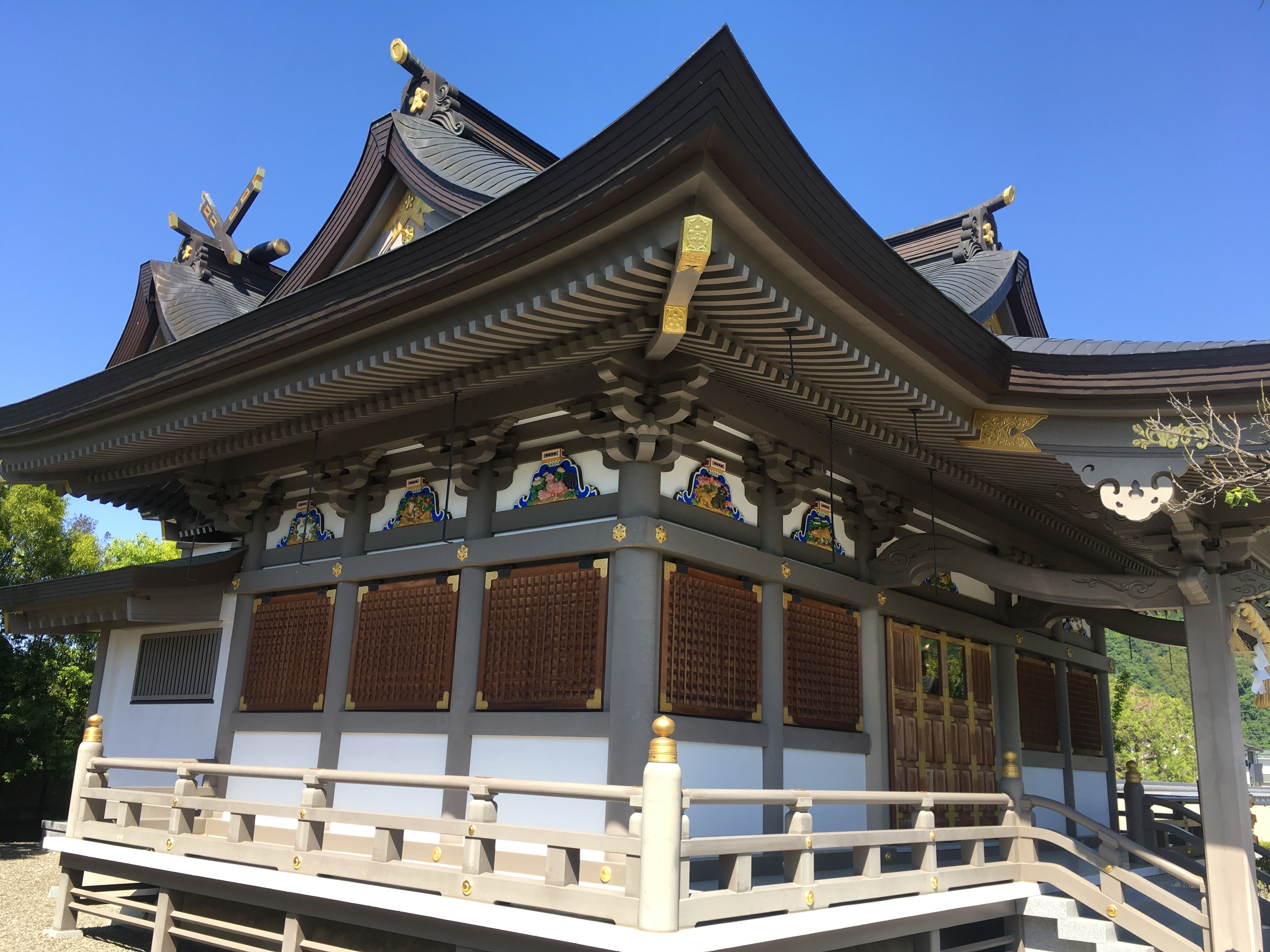
Yushimatennmangu Branch Shrine

The Kitano Museum of Art (北野美術館, Kitano Bijutsukan), which opened in 1968 as the first private art museum in Nagano Prefecture, is today run by a public interest incorporated foundation, in the Wakaho district, in the southeastern section of Nagano in Nagano Prefecture. The museum is located next to the Yushimatenmangu Shrine, a branch of Yushima Tenman-gū which was founded in 458 in Bunkyō in Tokyo. The entrance to the museum is through the Yushimatenmangu Shrine. The museum includes a Japanese garden by Mirei Shigemori, a notable 20th century modern landscape architect, that was completed in 1965.

In addition to the museum in Wakaho, there is an annex, the Kitano Cultural Center, which is located in downtown Nagano on Chuo Dori near the Gocho Campus of the University of Nagano and Zenkō-ji Temple; and the Togakushi Branch Museum of Kitano Museum of Art, which is located in the mountainous Togakushi district of Nagano City near the entrance to Togakushi Shrine. The Togakushi building received a Nagano City Landscape Award.

== History ==
- 1968 (March) - opening
- 2002 (August) -the current Yushimatenmangu Shrine was constructed
- 2003 (April) - opening of the Kitano Cultural Center in downtown Nagano
- 2015 (April) - opening of the Togakushi Branch Museum of Kitano Museum of Art
- 2019 (January) - re-opened after renovations

== Collection ==
Its collection of more than 600 pieces of art includes work by both Japanese and western artists.

- Its Japanese art collection includes work by:
  - Takeuchi Seihō
  - Uemura Shōen
  - Kanzan Shimomura
  - Hishida Shunsō
  - Gyoshū Hayami
  - Kiyokata Kaburagi
  - Shinsui Itō
- Its Western art collection includes by:
  - Pablo Picasso: Platter (1956) and Jug (n.d.)
  - Pierre-Auguste Renoir: La lecture (1897)
  - Henri-Edmond Cross: Le nuage (n.d.)
  - Marc Chagall: Mère et enfant, Le bouquet d'été, and Le héron
  - Auguste Rodin: Trois faunesses (1882)
  - Tsuguharu Foujita: A horse (1929), Children of stripped shirt (n.d.) and A cat (n.d.)
  - Armand Guillaumin
  - Jean Dufy
  - Pierre Bonnard
  - George Charles Aid
  - Bernard Buffet
  - Emilio Greco
  - fr:Shōhachi Kimura
  - Narashige Koide
  - fr:Shikanosuke Oka

== Operation ==
=== Hours ===
March-November, 9:30-17:00 December-February, 9:30-16:30 Closed on Mondays (except public holidays in Japan - but closed on New Year holidays)

=== Fees ===
Adults: 700 yen High school students, college students, and university students: 500 yen Junior high school students and younger: Free

=== Access ===
The museum in Wakaho is wheelchair accessible.

From Nagano Station, bus number 46, the Mamejima Hoshina Onsen Line (大豆島保科温泉線), run jointly by Nagaden Bus and Alpaca Transit, departs from the Zenkōji Exit. The closest bus stop to the museum is Wakaho Branch. From there, it is 500m to the museum.

By car, the museum is approximately 8 minutes from the Suzaka/Nagano Higashi IC, on the Jōshin-etsu Expressway.
