= Mount Takatsuma =

Mountain on the island of Honshu in Japan

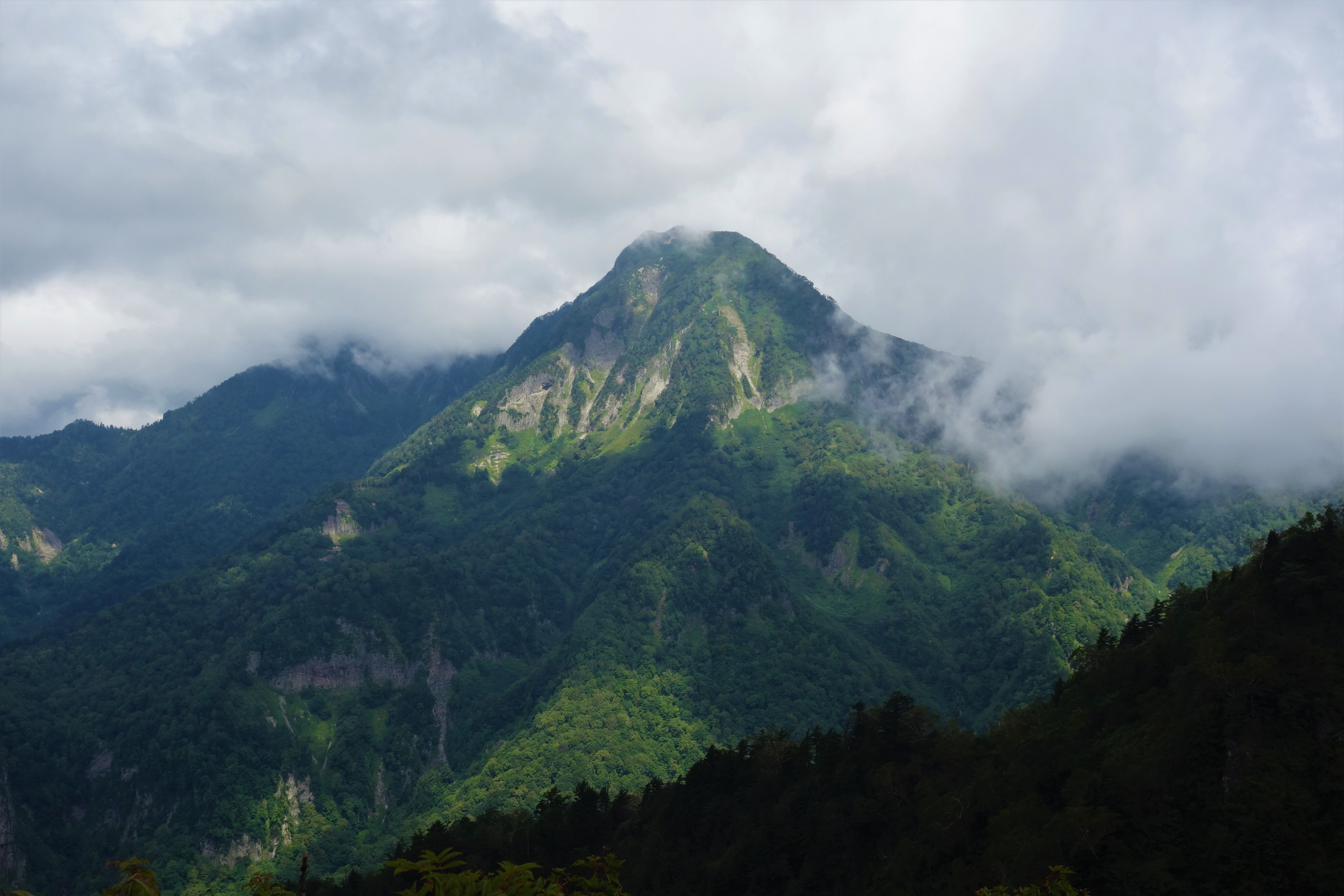
- Mount Takatsuma seen from Mount Togakushi

Highest point
- Elevation: 2,353 m (7,720 ft)
- Prominence: 795
- Listing: 100 Famous Japanese Mountains; List of mountains in Japan
- Coordinates: 36°48′00″N 138°03′07″E

Naming
- Native name: 高妻山 (Japanese)
- Pronunciation: Japanese: [taːkaːtsuːsaɴ]

Geography
- Location within Nagano Prefecture
- Location: Chūbu region, Honshu, Japan
- Parent range: Togakushi Mountain Range

Climbing
- Easiest route: Hike

Mount Takatsuma (高妻山, Takatsuma-yama) at 2,353 m (7,720 ft) straddles the border between Nagano and Niigata prefectures, in the northwest of the city of Nagano and southwest of the city of Myōkō (Niigata Prefecture), and is also the boundary between the Kanto and Chubu regional offices of the Japanese forest agency.

The mountain forms part of the Myōkō-Togakushi Renzan National Park, a natural area protected by the Japanese government. Its summit dominates the Togakushi Mountains, and is the fourth highest mountain in the national park. The mountain is one of the 100 Famous Japanese Mountains, and one of the 100 most famous mountains in Nagano (信州百名山). Because of its pyramidal shape, the mountain is also referred to as Togakushi Fuji.

The mountain, along with nearby Mount Togakushi and Mount Iizuna, is a sacred site for mountain-based religious sects such as Shugendo and Tendai, and the main trail includes 13 Buddhist statues, whose names remain such as Ichifudo, Gojizo, Shichi Kannon.

Due to its location near the Sea of Japan, heavy snows are frequent in winter, and creeping pine, haimatsu (ハイマツ), can be found here despite the elevation below 2500m. Other trees and plants include Japanese rowan, rhododendron, Japanese alder, Japanese wood poppy, Japanese lady bells, and rockfoils.

== Watershed ==
Waters from the northeast side of the mountain flow to the Hyōsawa River, and then the Seki River, through the cities of Myoko and Joetsu in Niigata to the Sea of Japan. Waters from the south side of the mountain flow through the city of Nagano to the Susobana River, which meets the Sai River, and finally the Chikuma River, Japan's longest river system, which flows into the Sea of Japan at Niigata (city).

== Hiking ==
The main climbing route is approximately 8.5–9.5 hours, and thus is considered one of the longest trails amount the 100 famous mountains in Japan. The trail begins at Togakushi Campground (1175m) at the base of Mount Togakushi. The climb rises to Ichifudo emergency shelter (一不動避難小屋) (1747m), and then follows the ridge to Mount Gojizo (五地蔵山) (1998m). From there, the path descends and rises again slightly to Roku-miroku (六弥勒) (1975m), Shichi-yakushi (七薬師)(1965m), Hachi-kannon (八観音) (2040m), Kyu-seishi (九勢至) (2050m), and then rises steeply to the summit (2353m). The last 150m has several steep rock climbs and chain sections.

Because of its location at the back of the Togakushi Mountain Ridge, the climb is rated as requiring one night or more on the Nagano Trail Guide by Grade, and there are some difficult rocky sections with chains However, because there are no lodging facilities along the route, hikers start early, often before sunrise.

One alternative route is via the newer Miroku Ridge Trail (弥勒尾根新道), which also begins at Togakushi Campground, and climbs to Roku-Miroku (1975m) on Mount Gojizo. The Miroku Ridge Trail involves fewer dangerous rock sections, and is shorter in distance than the main climbing trail, but with steeper, frequently muddy sections, some with ropes and chains. A second alternative, and longer, route is to first climb Mount Togakushi beginning from Togakushi Shrine, descend to the Ichifudo emergency shelter, and continue from there. However, this section involves more difficult and dangerous sections. There is no mountain trail from the Niigata Prefecture side of the mountain.

There is no ski resort on the mountain; however, experienced back country skiers do climb and then ski Mount Takatsuma in winter.

== Gallery ==
Mount Takatsuma
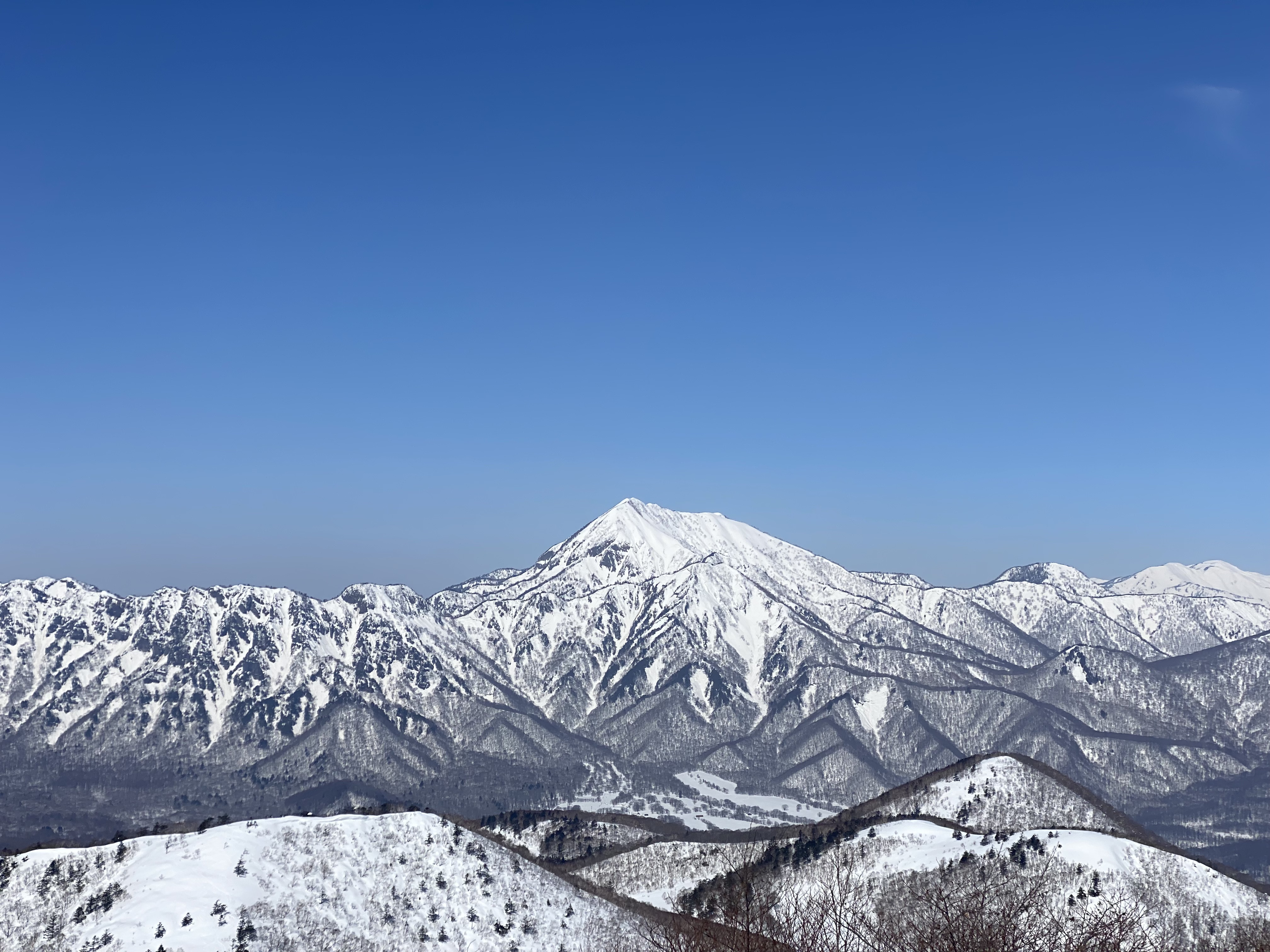
Late winter photo of Mount Takatsuma and the Togakushi Ridge from the summit of Mount Iizuna

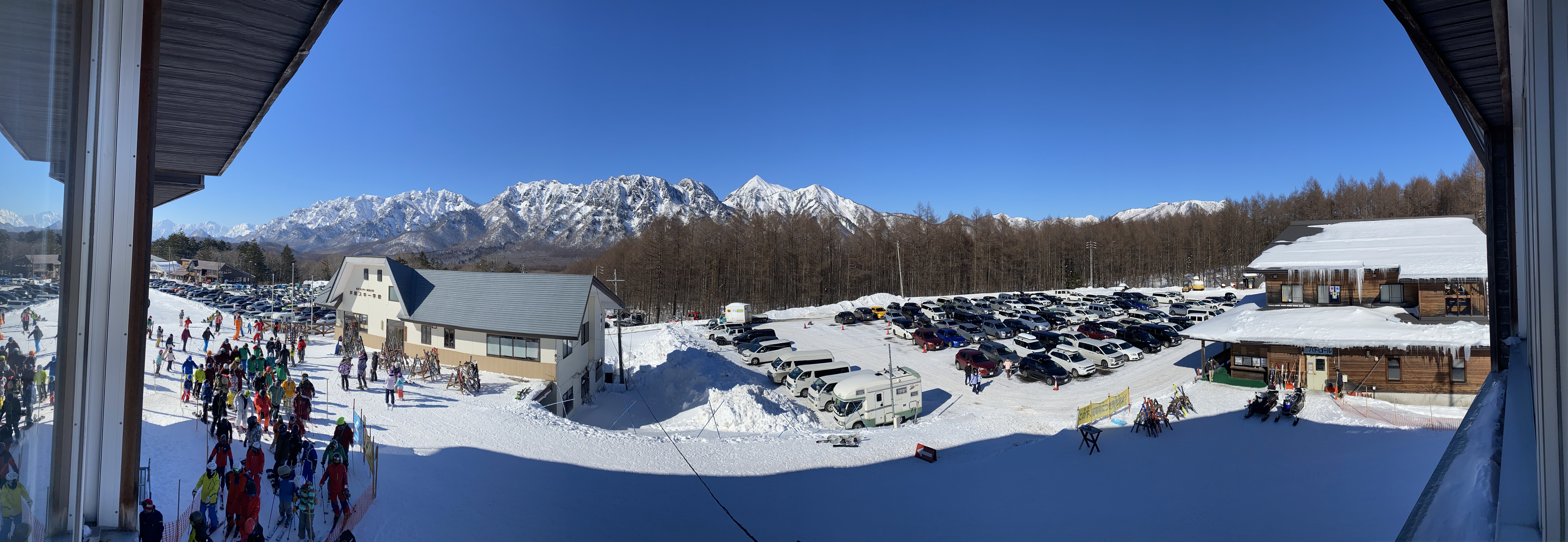
Mount Togakushi, Mount Takatsuma (centre), and Gojizo Mountain from the Togakushi Ski Field

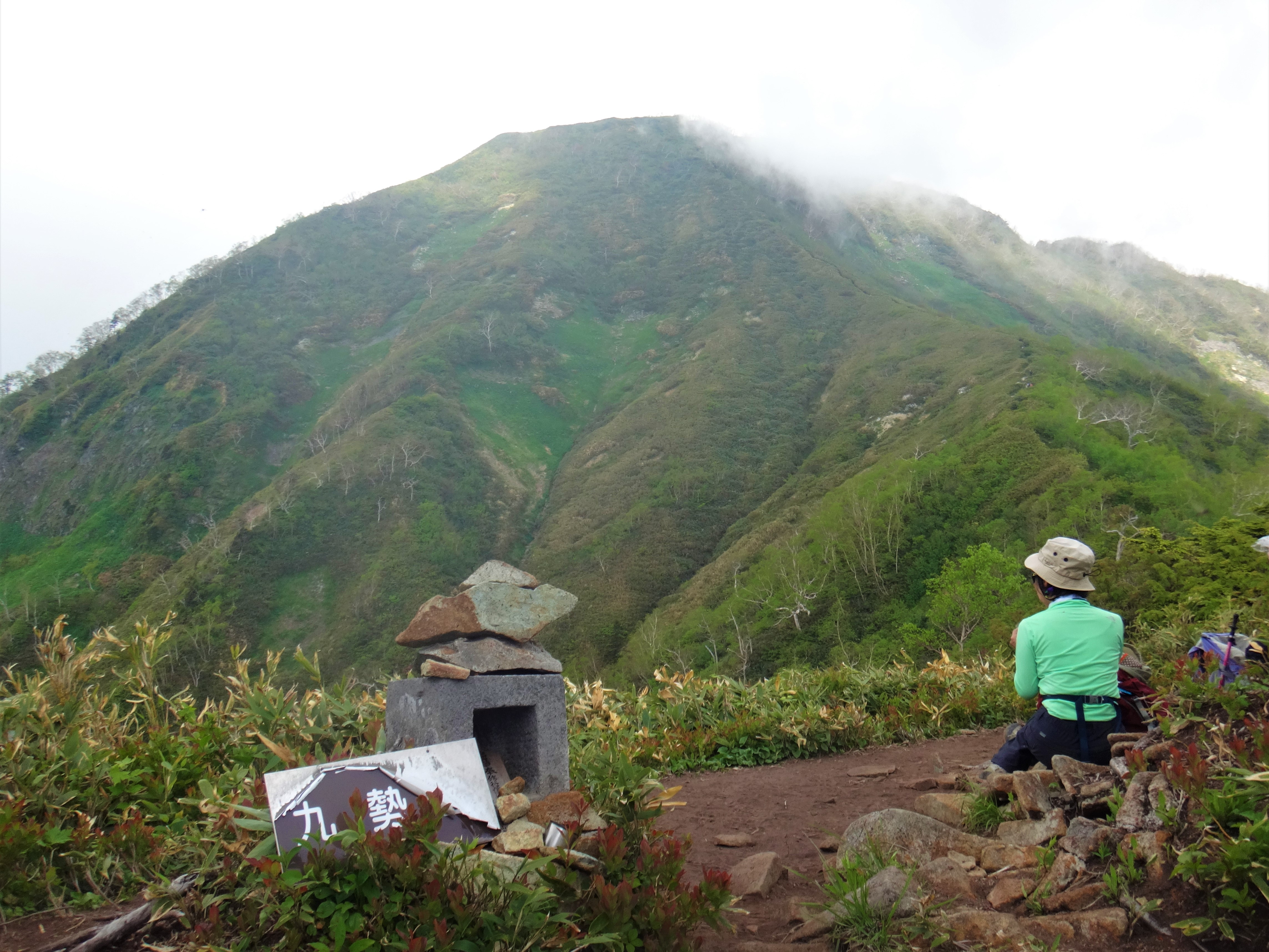
Mount Takatsuma from the 9th Station, Seishi (勢至)(2,050m)

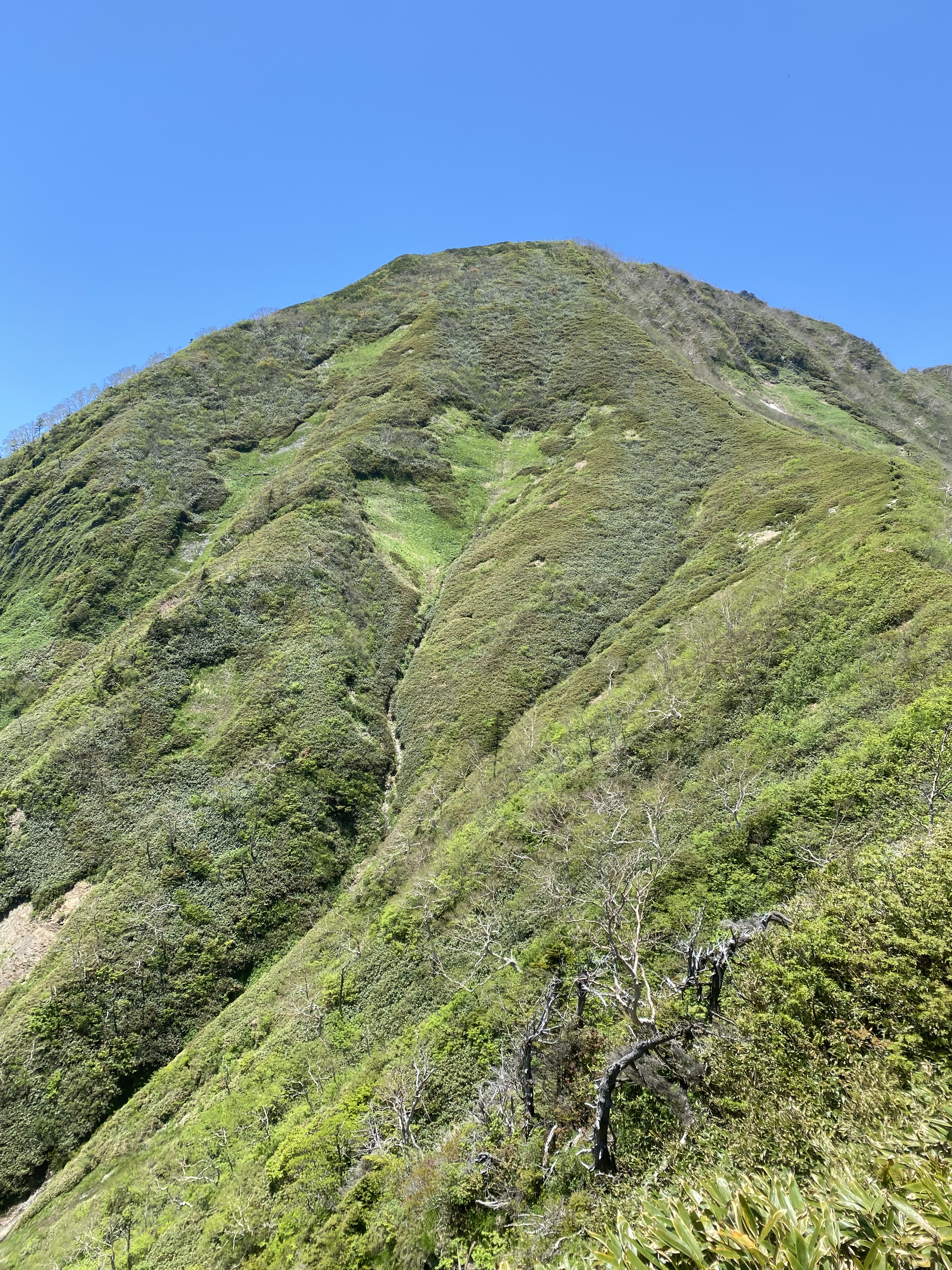
Mount Takatsuma from Kyuseishi, June 2023

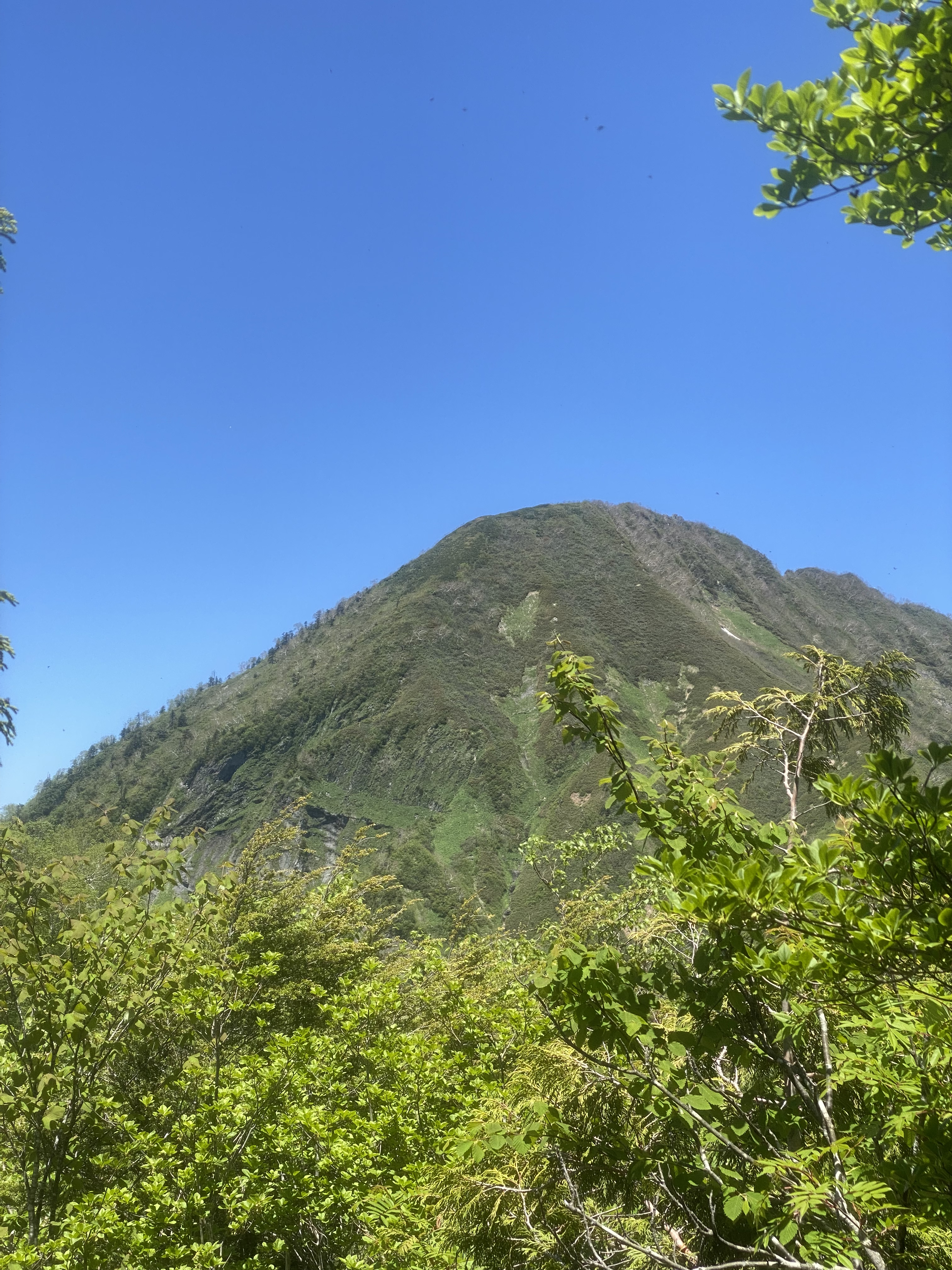
Summit of Mount Takatsuma from Rokumiroku (1975m) on Mount Gojizo, June 2023

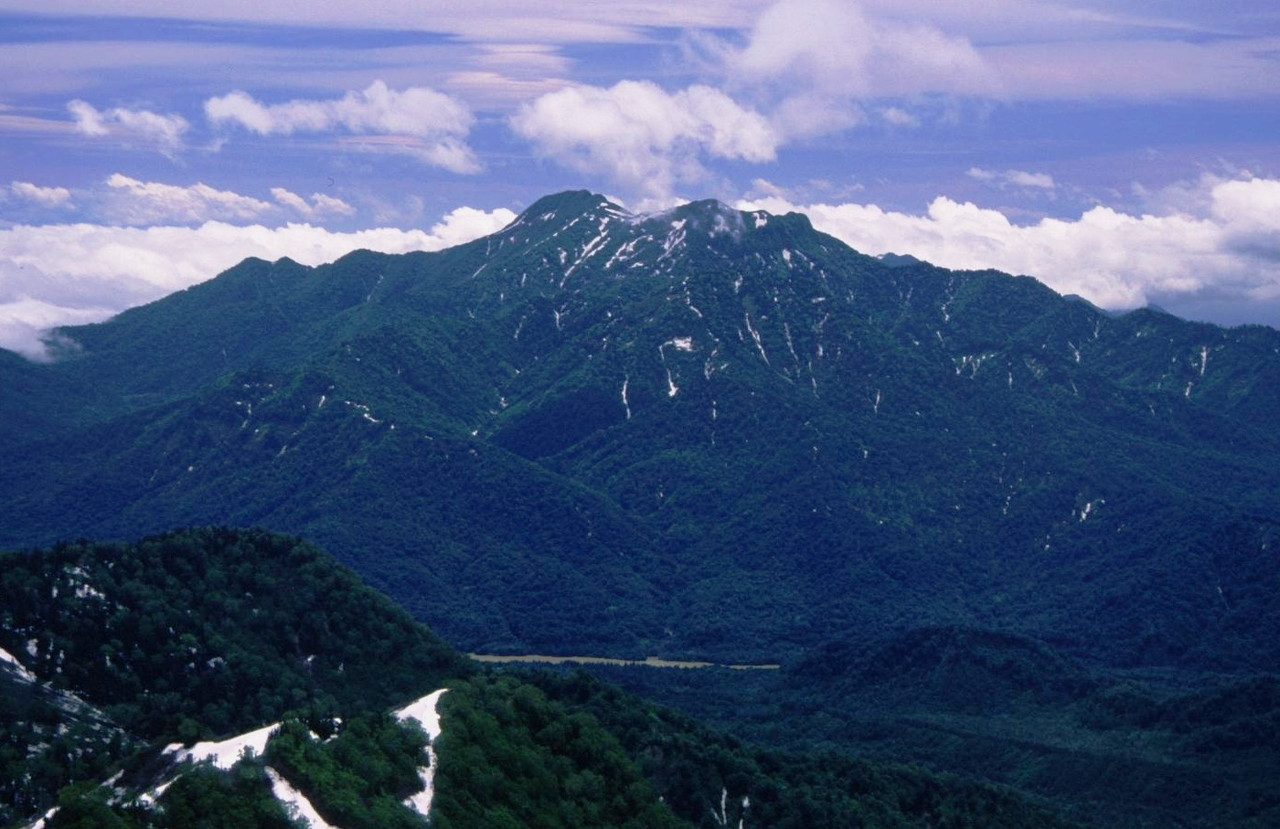
Mount Takatsuma from Mount Hiuchi (2,462m)

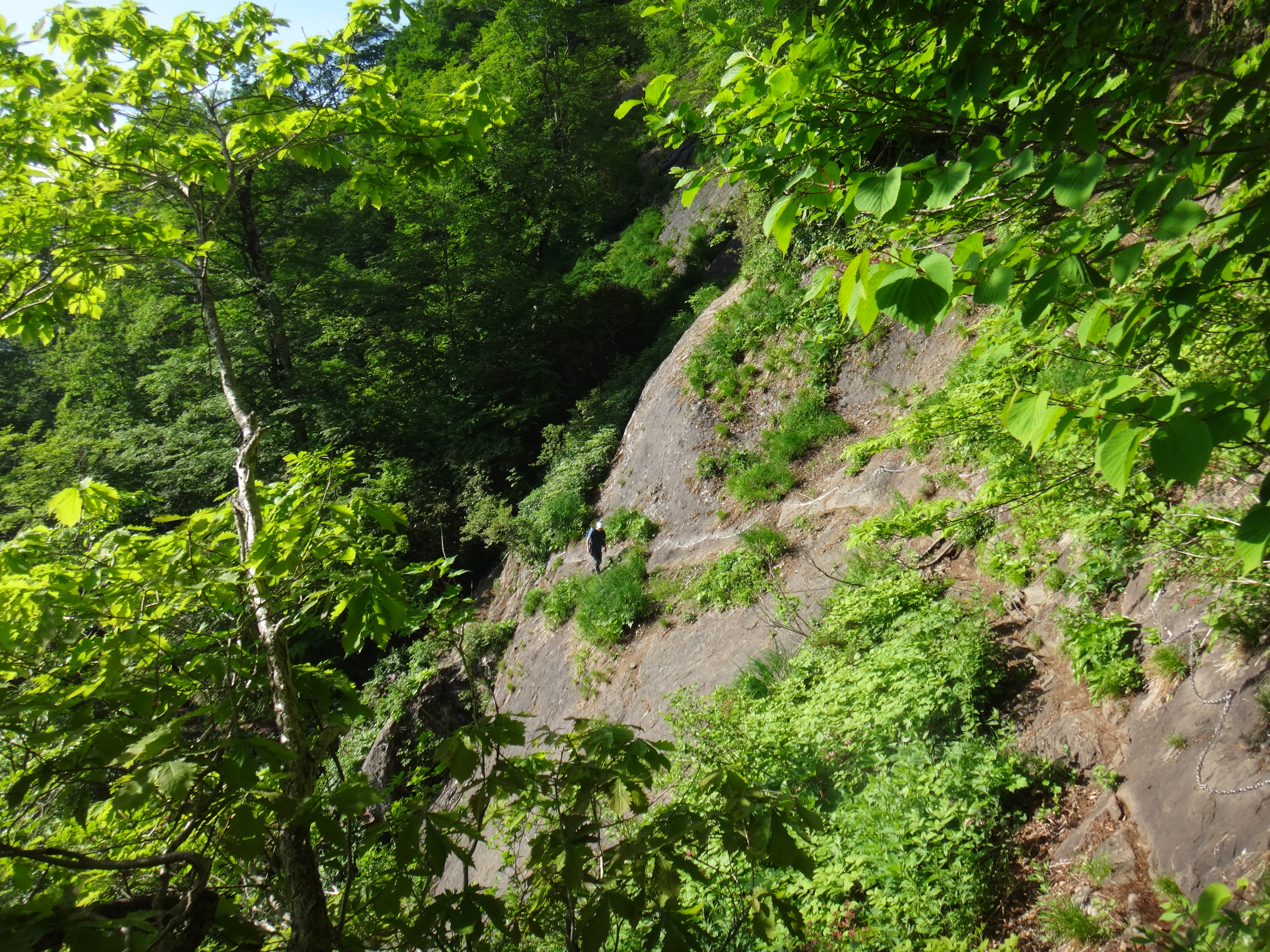
Obi Rock chain below Ichifudo (1,596m)

== See also ==
- 100 Famous Japanese Mountains
- Myōkō-Togakushi Renzan National Park
- Nagano Prefecture
- Niigata Prefecture
- Togakushi Shrine
