= Toyono, Nagano =

Dissolved municipality in Nagano prefecture, Japan

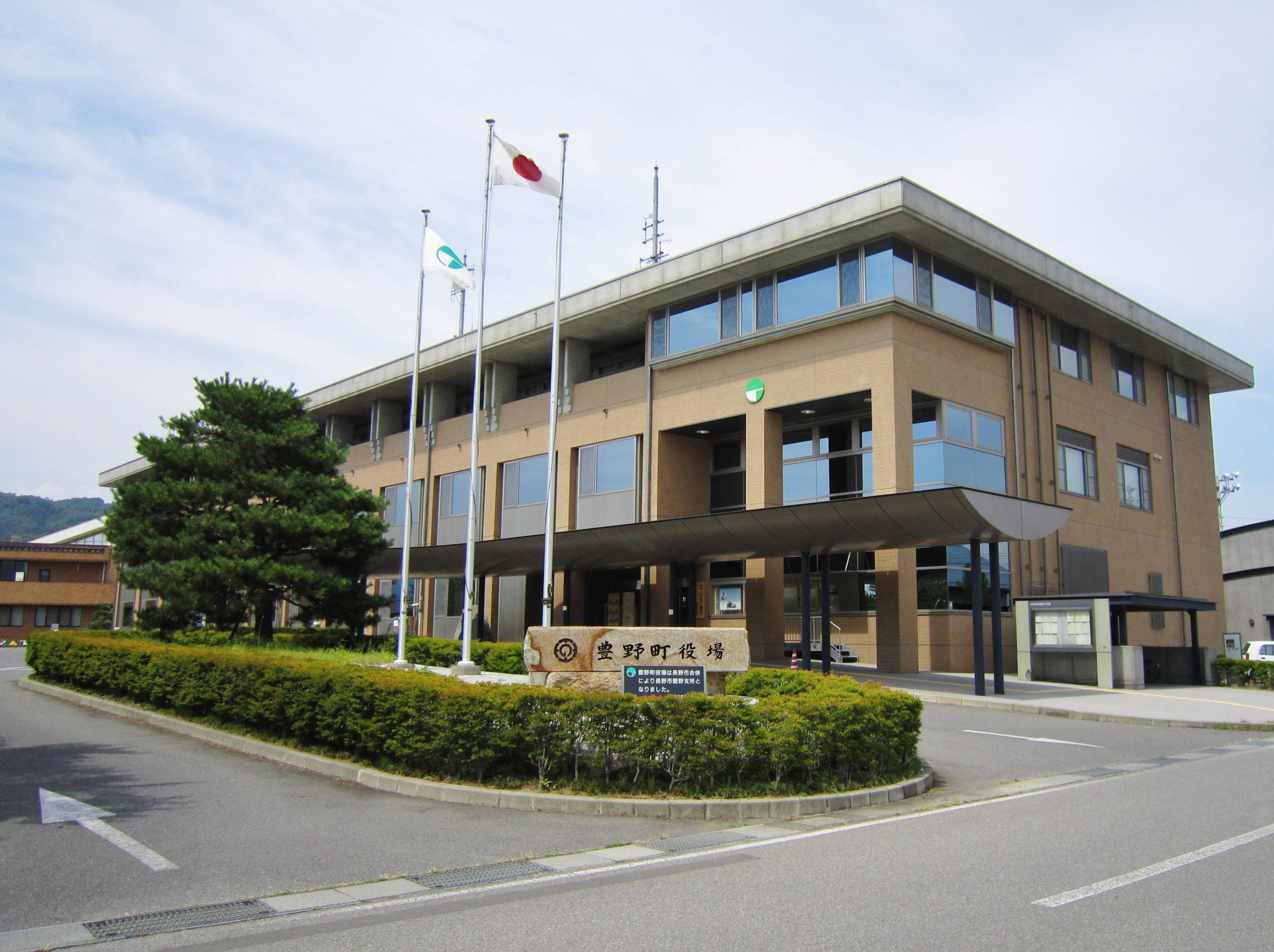
former Toyono town hall

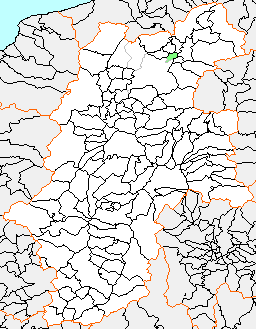
Location of Toyono in Nagano Prefecture

Toyono (豊野町, Toyono-machi) was a town located in Kamiminochi District, Nagano Prefecture, Japan.

As of 2003, the town had an estimated population of 10,090 and a density of 507.04 persons per km^{2}. The total area was 19.90 km^{2}.

On January 1, 2005, Toyono, along with the village of Ōoka (from Sarashina District), and the villages of Kinasa and Togakushi (all from Kamiminochi District), was merged into the expanded city of Nagano.
