= Mure, Nagano =

Dissolved municipality in Nagano prefecture, Japan

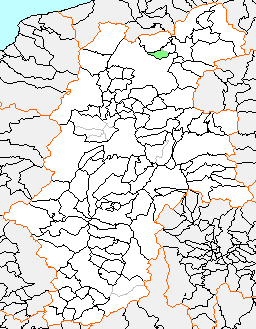
Map of Mure, Nagano

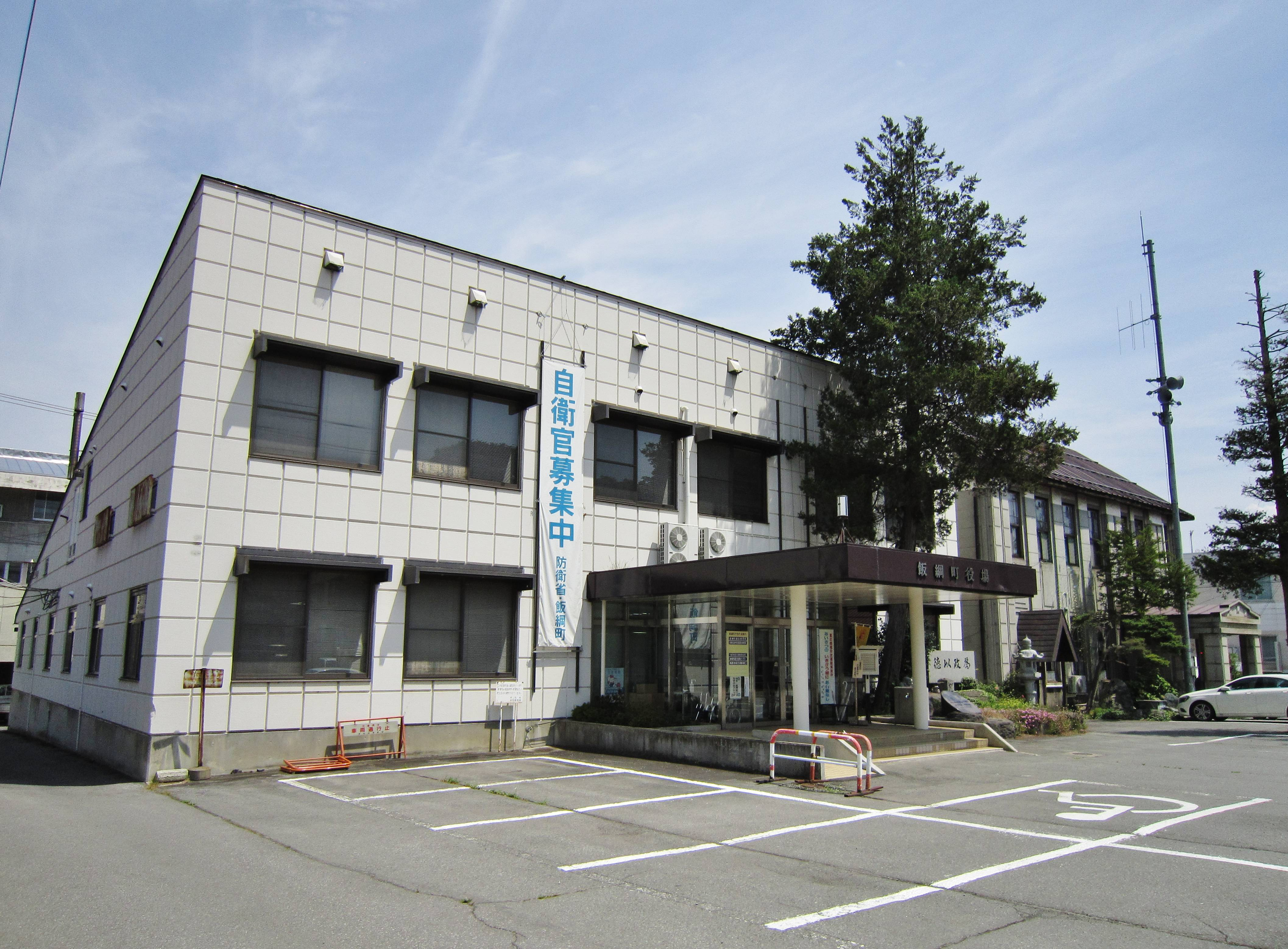
former Mure Town Hall

Mure (牟礼村, Mure-mura) was a village located in Kamiminochi District, Nagano Prefecture, Japan.

In 2003, the village had an estimated population of 7,442 and a density of 186.75 persons per km^{2}. The total area was 39.85 km^{2}.

On October 1, 2005, Mure was merged with the village of Samizu (also from Kamiminochi District) to create the town of Iizuna.
