= Kinasa, Nagano =

Dissolved municipality in Nagano prefecture, Japan

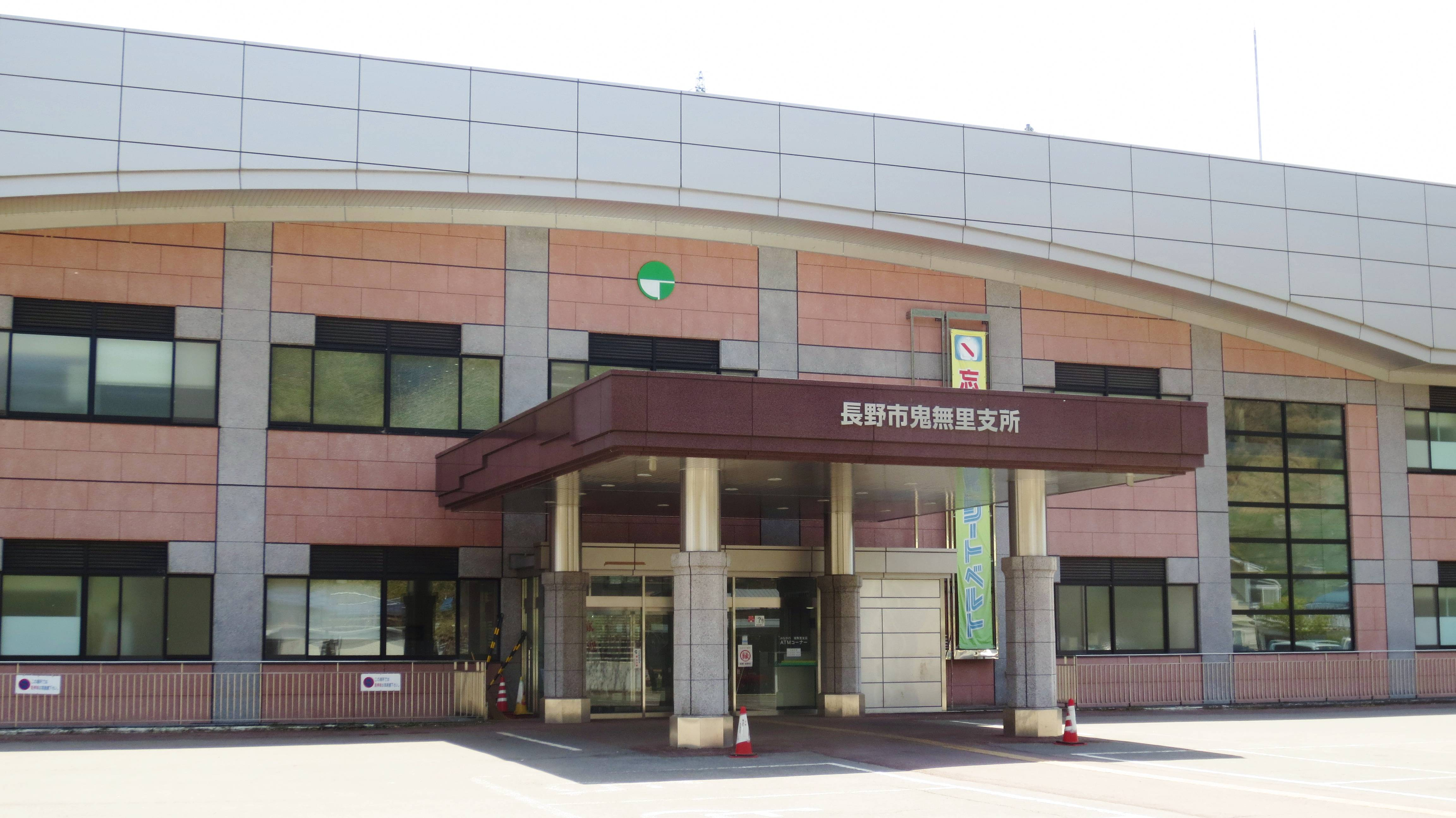
former Kinasa village hall

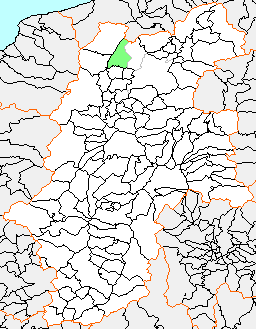
location of Kinasa in Nagano Prefecture

Kinasa (鬼無里村, Kinasa-mura) was a village located in Kamiminochi District, Nagano Prefecture, Japan.

As of 2003, the village had an estimated population of 2,140 and a density of 15.85 persons per km^{2}. The total area was 134.99 km^{2}.

On January 1, 2005, Kinasa, along with the village of Ōoka (from Sarashina District), the town of Toyono, and the village of Togakushi (all from Kamiminochi District), was merged into the expanded city of Nagano.
