= Ogawa, Nagano =

Ogawa 小川村
- Village
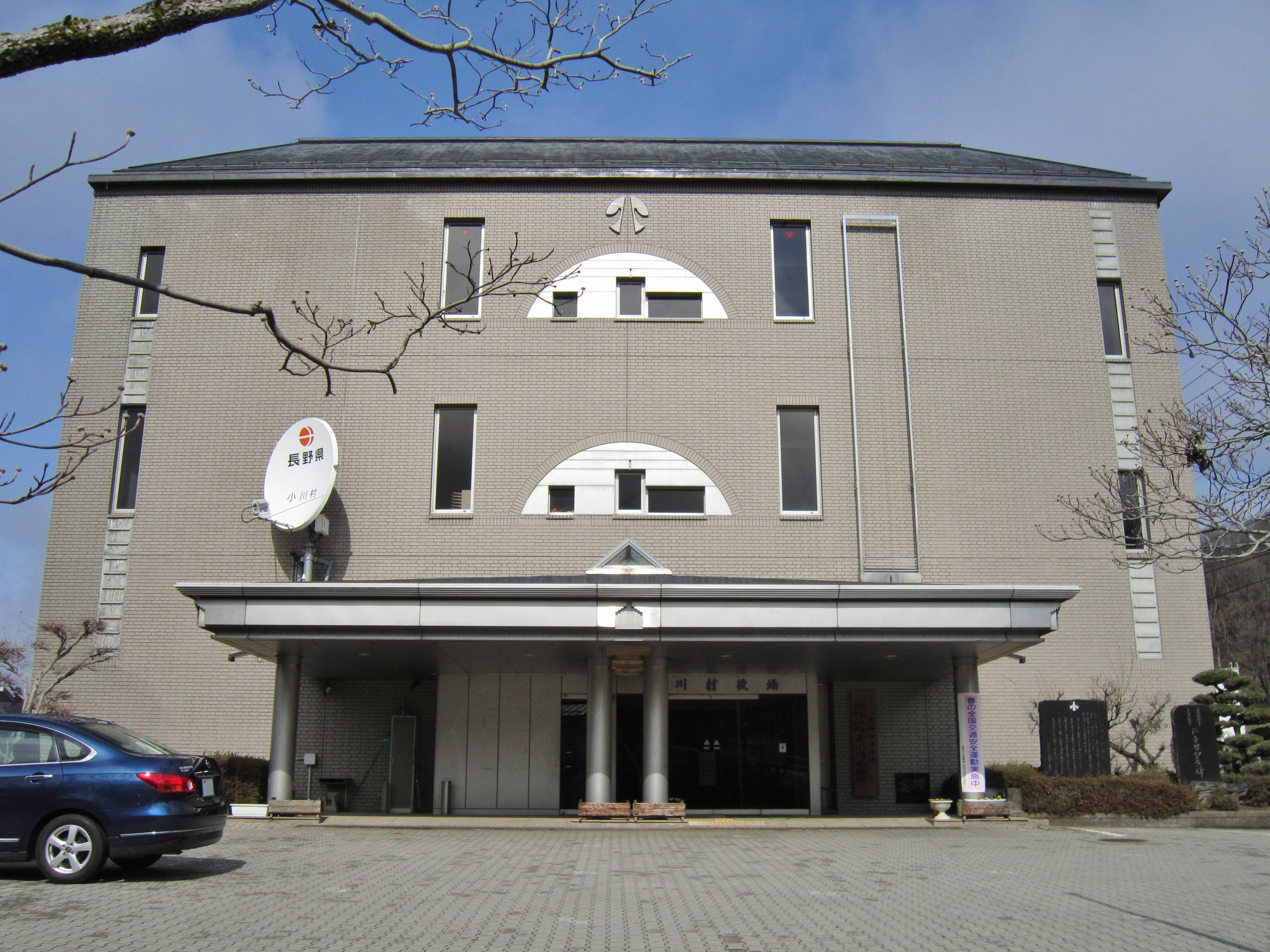
- Ogawa Village Hall

- Flag Seal

- Location of Ogawa in Nagano Prefecture

- Coordinates: 36°37′2″N 137°58′29″E
- Country: Japan
- Region: Chūbu (Kōshin'etsu)
- Prefecture: Nagano
- District: Kamiminochi

Area
  - Total: 58.11 km^{2} (22.44 sq mi)

Population (April 2019)
  - Total: 2,585
  - Density: 44.48/km^{2} (115.2/sq mi)
- Time zone: UTC+9 (Japan Standard Time)
- Symbols
- Phone number: 026-269-2323
- Address: 8800-8 Takafu, Ogawa-mura, Kamiminochi-gun, Nagano-ken 381-3302
- Website: Official website

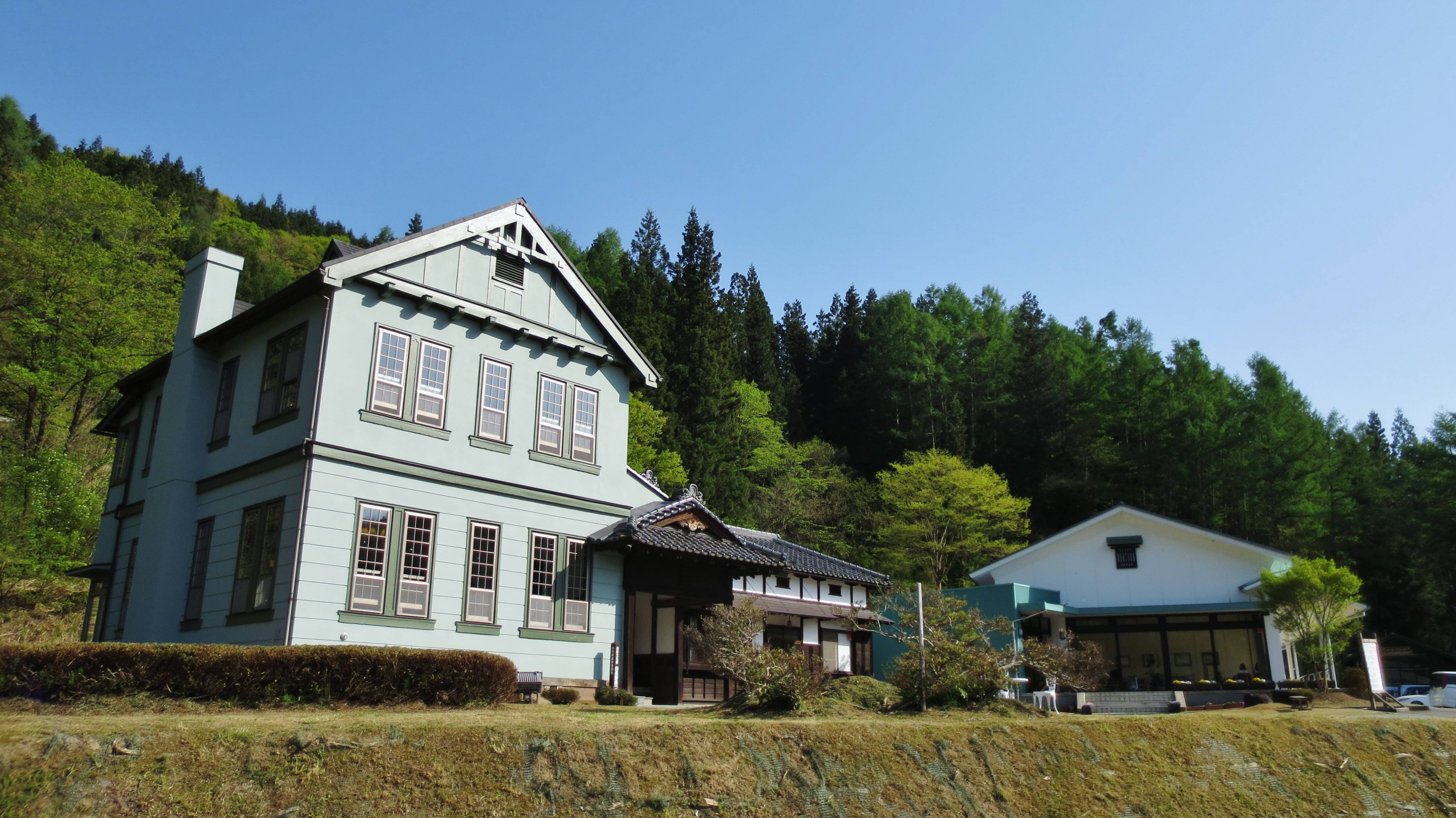
Furusato Land Ogawa

Ogawa (小川村, Ogawa-mura) is a village located in Nagano Prefecture, Japan. As of 1 April 2019, the village had an estimated population of 2,585 in 1074 households, and a population density of 44 persons per km^{2}. The total area of the village is 58.11 square kilometres (22.44 sq mi). Ogawa is listed as one of The Most Beautiful Villages in Japan.

== Geography ==
Ogawa is located in the mountains of northwestern Nagano Prefecture.

=== Surrounding municipalities ===
- Nagano Prefecture
  - Hakuba
  - Nagano
  - Ōmachi

=== Climate ===
The village has a humid continental climate characterized by short, hot and humid summers, and cold winters with heavy snowfall (Köppen climate classification Cfa). The average annual temperature in Ogawa is 10.3 °C. The average annual rainfall is 1273 mm with September as the wettest month. The temperatures are highest on average in August, at around 23.8 °C, and lowest in January, at around -2.3 °C.

== Demographics ==
Per Japanese census data, the population of Ogawa has declined by more than three-quarters from its peak around 1950.

Historical population
Year	Pop.	±%
1940	8,846	—
1950	9,436	+6.7%
1960	8,283	−12.2%
1970	6,163	−25.6%
1980	5,132	−16.7%
1990	4,133	−19.5%
2000	3,620	−12.4%
2010	3,046	−15.9%
2020	2,215	−27.3%

== History ==
The area of present-day Ogawa was part of ancient Shinano Province. The villages of Kita-Ogawa and Minami-Ogawa were created with the establishment of the modern municipalities system on April 1, 1889. The two villages merged to form the village of Ogawa on April 1, 1955.

== Economy ==
The economy of Ogawa is agricultural, primarily rice cultivation and horticulture.

== Education ==
Ogawa has one public elementary school and one public middle school operated by the village government. The village does not have a high school.

== Transportation ==
=== Railway ===
- Ogawa does not have any passenger railway service.

=== Highway ===
- National Route 406

== Local attractions ==
- Furusato Land Ogawa, local history museum
