= Kamiminochi District, Nagano =

District in Nagano prefecture, Japan

Coordinates: 36.783°N 138.154°E

Kamiminochi (上水内郡, Kamiminochi-gun) is a district located in Nagano Prefecture, Japan.

As of 2011, the district has an estimated population of 23,774 with a density of 84.11 persons per km^{2}. The total area is 282.65 km^{2}.

== Municipalities ==
The district consists of two towns and one village:

- Iizuna (Note: Classified as a town.)
- Ogawa (Note: Classified as a village.)
- Shinano

== History ==
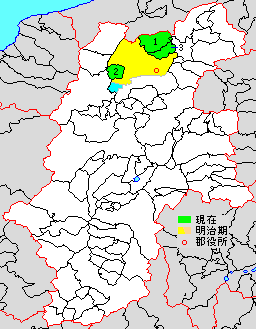
Map showing original extent of Kamiminochi District in Nagano Prefecture: * yellow - areas formerly within the district borders during the early Meiji period: 1. Shinano-machi; 2. Ogawa-mura; 3. Iizuna-machi

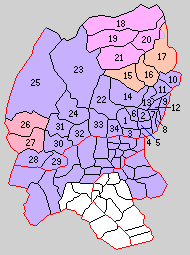
Colored areas are in this district.

=== Recent mergers ===
- On January 1, 2005 - The town of Toyono and the villages of Togakushi and Kinasa were merged into the expanded city of Nagano.
- On October 1, 2005 - The villages of Mure and Samizu were merged to form the new town of Iizuna.
- On January 1, 2010 - The town of Shinshūshinmachi and the village of Nakajō were merged into the expanded city of Nagano.
