= Mure Station =

Railway station in Iizuna, Nagano Prefecture, Japan

Mure Station 牟礼駅
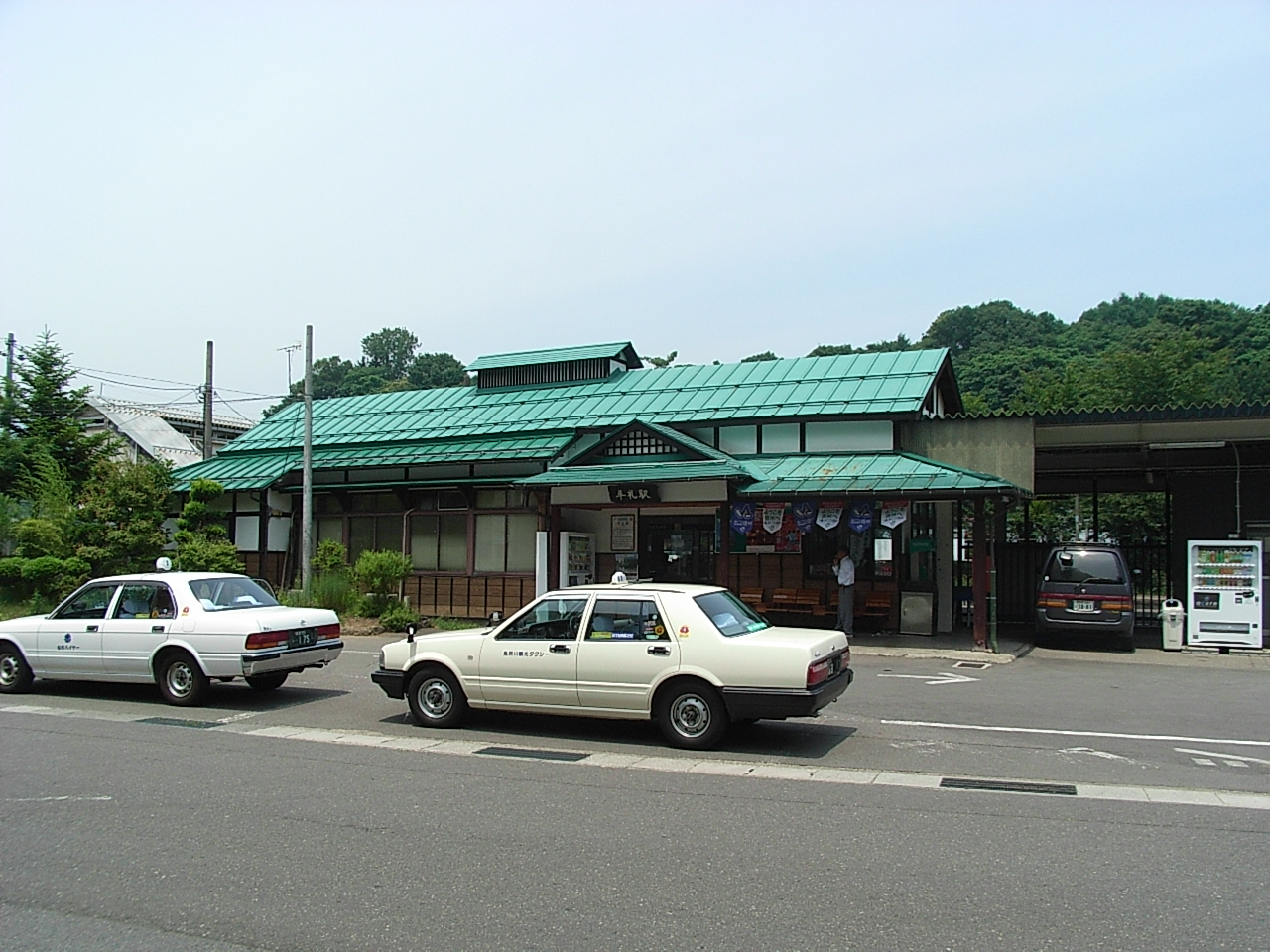
- Mure Station in June 2009

General information
- Location: 4921-1 Toyono, Iizuna-machi, Kamiminochi-gun, Nagano-ken 387-0013; Japan
- Coordinates: 36.7532°N 138.2470°E
- Elevation: 487.1 metres (1,598 ft)
- Operator: Shinano Railway
- Line: ■ Kita-Shinano Line
- Distance: 18.6 kilometres (11.6 mi) from Nagano
- Platforms: 2 side platforms
- Tracks: 2

Other information
- Status: Staffed
- Website: Official website

History
- Opened: 1 May 1888

Passengers
- FY2013: 767
Location
- Location within Nagano Prefecture Location within Japan

Mure Station (牟礼駅, Mure-eki) is a railway station on the Kita-Shinano Line in Iizuna, Nagano, Japan, operated by the third-sector railway operating company Shinano Railway.

== Lines ==
Mure Station is served by the 37.3 km Kita-Shinano Line and is 18.6 kilometers from the starting point of the line at Nagano Station.

== Station layout ==
The station has two opposed ground-level side platforms connected to the station building by a footbridge. The station is staffed.

=== Platforms ===
station side	■ Kita-Shinano Line	for Myōkō-Kōgen
opposite side	■ Kita-Shinano Line	for Nagano

== Adjacent stations ==
←	Service	→
Kita-Shinano Line
Toyono	Local	Furuma

== History ==
The station opened on 1 May 1888. With the privatization of Japanese National Railways (JNR) on 1 April 1987, the station came under the control of East Japan Railway Company (JR East).

From 14 March 2015, with the opening of the Hokuriku Shinkansen extension from Nagano to Kanazawa, local passenger operations over sections of the Shinetsu Main Line and Hokuriku Main Line running roughly parallel to the new shinkansen line were reassigned to third-sector railway operating companies. From this date, Mure Station was transferred to the ownership of the third-sector operating company Shinano Railway.

== Passenger statistics ==
In fiscal 2013, while still under the control of JR East, the station was used by an average of 767 passengers daily (boarding passengers only).

== Surrounding area ==
- Iizuna Town Hall
- National Route 18

== See also ==
- List of railway stations in Japan
- Sanuki-Mure Station
