= Sansai Station =

Railway station in Nagano, Nagano Prefecture, Japan

Sansai Station 三才駅
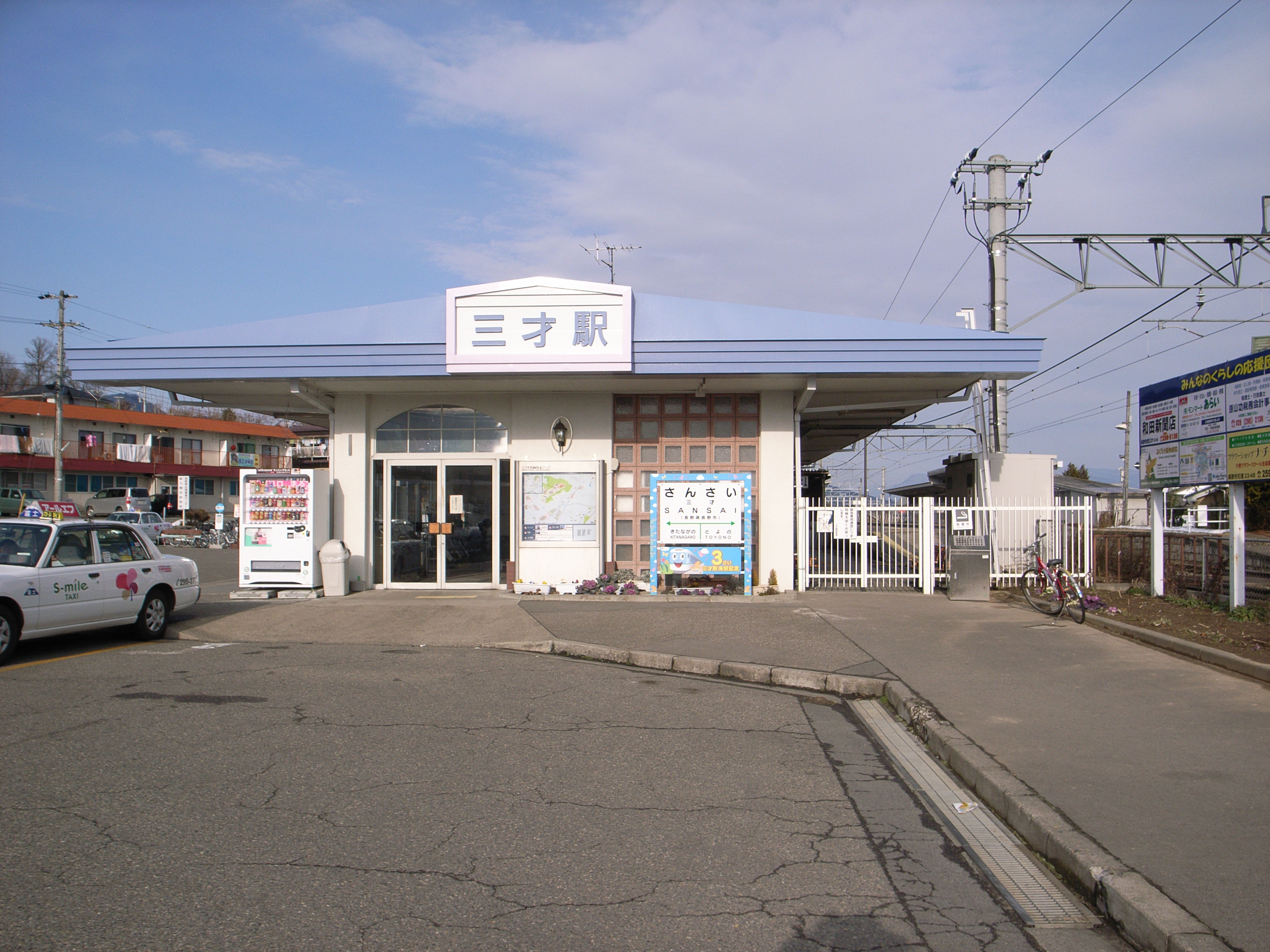
- South side of the station building in January 2010

General information
- Location: 2207 Sansai-Nenbutsuzuka, Nagano-shi, Nagano-ken 381-0081; Japan
- Coordinates: 36.6867°N 138.2442°E
- Elevation: 345.1 metres (1,132 ft)
- Operator: Shinano Railway
- Line: ■ Kita-Shinano Line
- Distance: 6.8 kilometres (4.2 mi) from Nagano
- Platforms: 2 side platforms
- Tracks: 2

Other information
- Status: Staffed
- Website: Official website

History
- Opened: 8 January 1958

Passengers
- FY2014: 1,424 daily

Services
Preceding station	JR East	Following station
Kita-Nagano towards Nagano	Iiyama Line	Toyono towards Echigo-Kawaguchi
Preceding station	Shinano Railway	Following station
Kita-Nagano towards Nagano	Kita-Shinano Line	Toyono towards Myoko-Kogen
Location
- Location within Nagano Prefecture Location within Japan

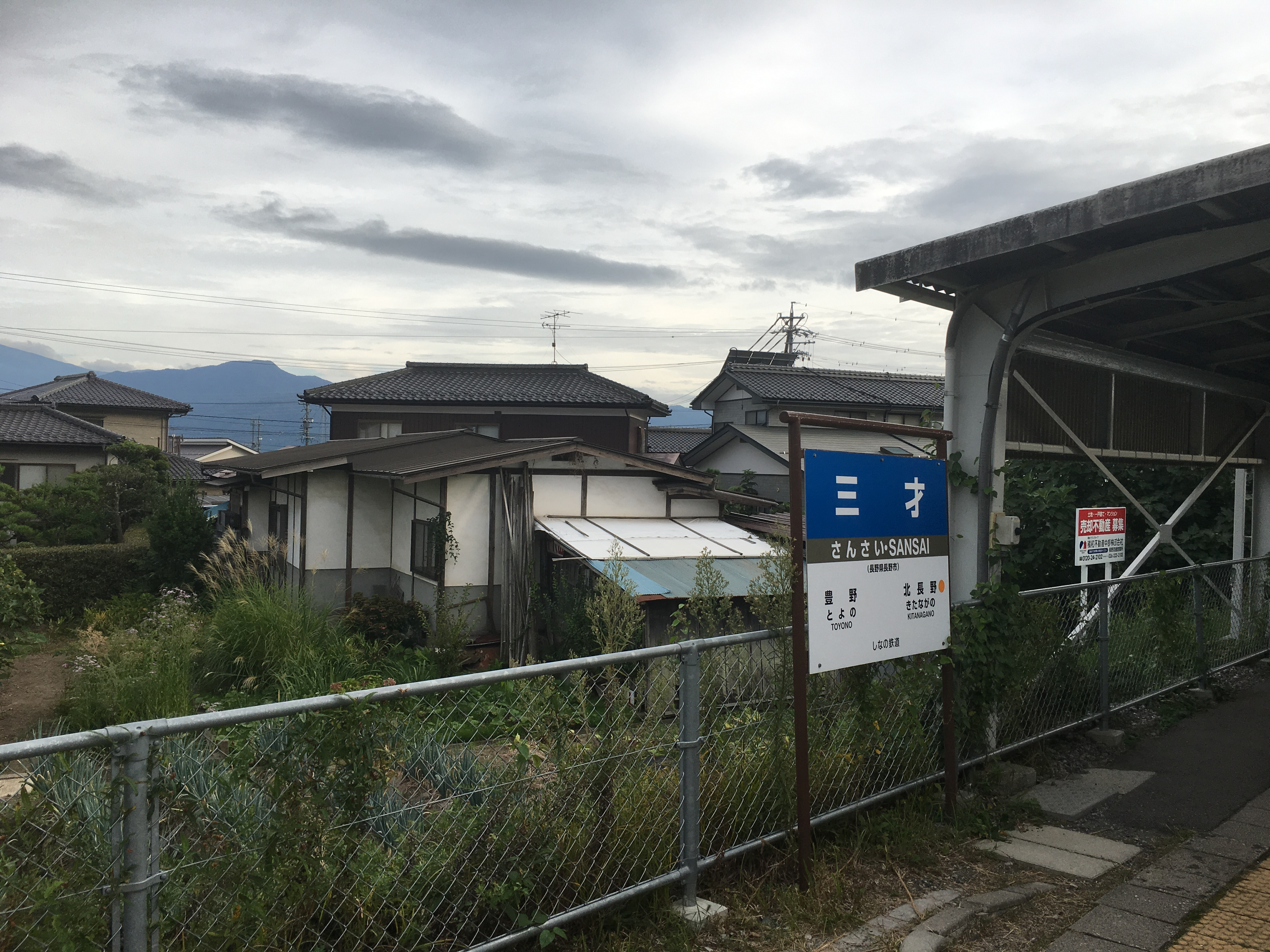
Station platform, 2019

Sansai Station (三才駅, Sansai-eki) is a railway station on the Shinano Railway Kita-Shinano Line in the city of Nagano, Japan, operated by the third-sector railway operating company Shinano Railway

== Lines ==
Sansai Station is served by the 37.3 km Kita-Shinano Line, and is 6.8 kilometers from the starting point of the line at Nagano Station. Some trains of the Iiyama Line continue past the nominal terminus of the line at Toyono Station and terminal at Nagano Station, stopping at this station en route.

== Station layout ==
The station consists of two opposed side platforms serving two tracks. The platforms are connected by both a level crossing and an underground passage.

=== Platforms ===
1	■ Kita-Shinano Line	for Toyono and Myōkō-Kōgen
1	■ Iiyama Line	for Togari-Nozawaonsen, Tōkamachi, and Echigo-Kawaguchi
2	■ Kita-Shinano Line	for Nagano
2	■ Iiyama Line	for Nagano

== History ==
The station opened on 8 January 1958. With the privatization of Japanese National Railways (JNR) on 1 April 1987, the station came under the control of East Japan Railway Company (JR East).

From 14 March 2015, with the opening of the Hokuriku Shinkansen extension from Nagano to Kanazawa, local passenger operations over sections of the Shinetsu Main Line and Hokuriku Main Line running roughly parallel to the new Shinkansen line were reassigned to third-sector railway operating companies. From that date, Sansai Station was transferred to the ownership of the third-sector operating company Shinano Railway.

== Passenger statistics ==
In fiscal 2016, the station was used by an average of 1,424 passengers daily (boarding passengers only).

== Surrounding area ==
- Seisen Jogakuin College

== See also ==
- List of railway stations in Japan
