= Kita-Nagano Station =

Railway station in Nagano, Nagano Prefecture, Japan

Kita-Nagano Station 北長野駅
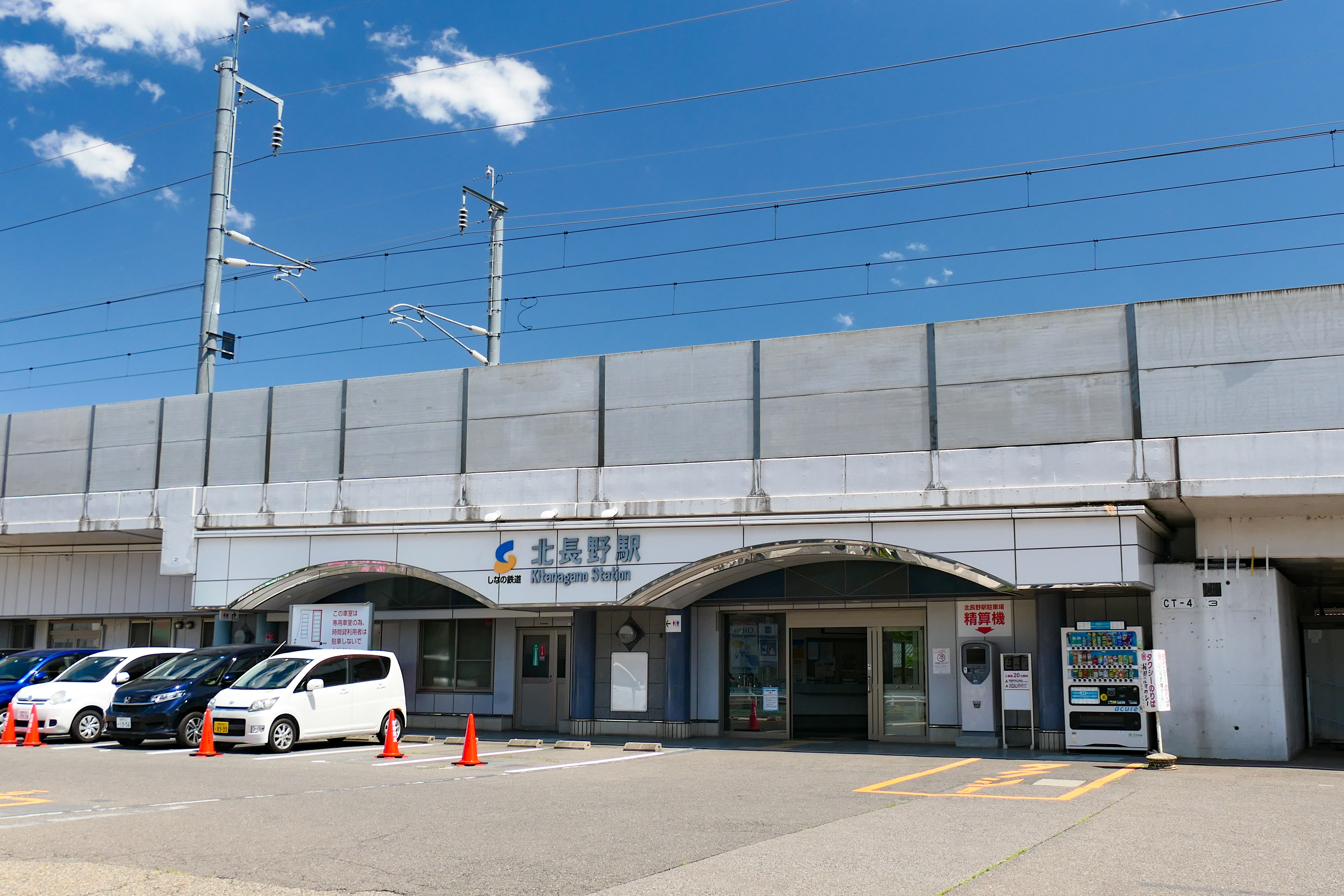
- Kita-Nagano Station in May 2022

General information
- Location: 2-34-34 Nakagoe, Nagano-shi, Nagano-ken 381-0044; Japan
- Coordinates: 36.6650°N 138.2224°E
- Elevation: 365.4 metres (1,199 ft)
- Operator: Shinano Railway; JR Freight
- Line: ■ Kita-Shinano Line
- Distance: 3.9 kilometres (2.4 mi) from Nagano
- Platforms: 1 side + 1 island platforms
- Tracks: 3

Other information
- Status: Staffed
- Website: Official website

History
- Opened: 1 September 1898
- Former names: Yoshida Station (until April 1957)

Passengers
- FY2016: 2,187 daily

Services
Preceding station	JR East	Following station
Nagano Terminus	Iiyama Line	Sansai towards Echigo-Kawaguchi
Preceding station	Shinano Railway	Following station
Nagano Terminus	Kita-Shinano Line	Sansai towards Myoko-Kogen
Location
- Location within Nagano Prefecture Location within Japan

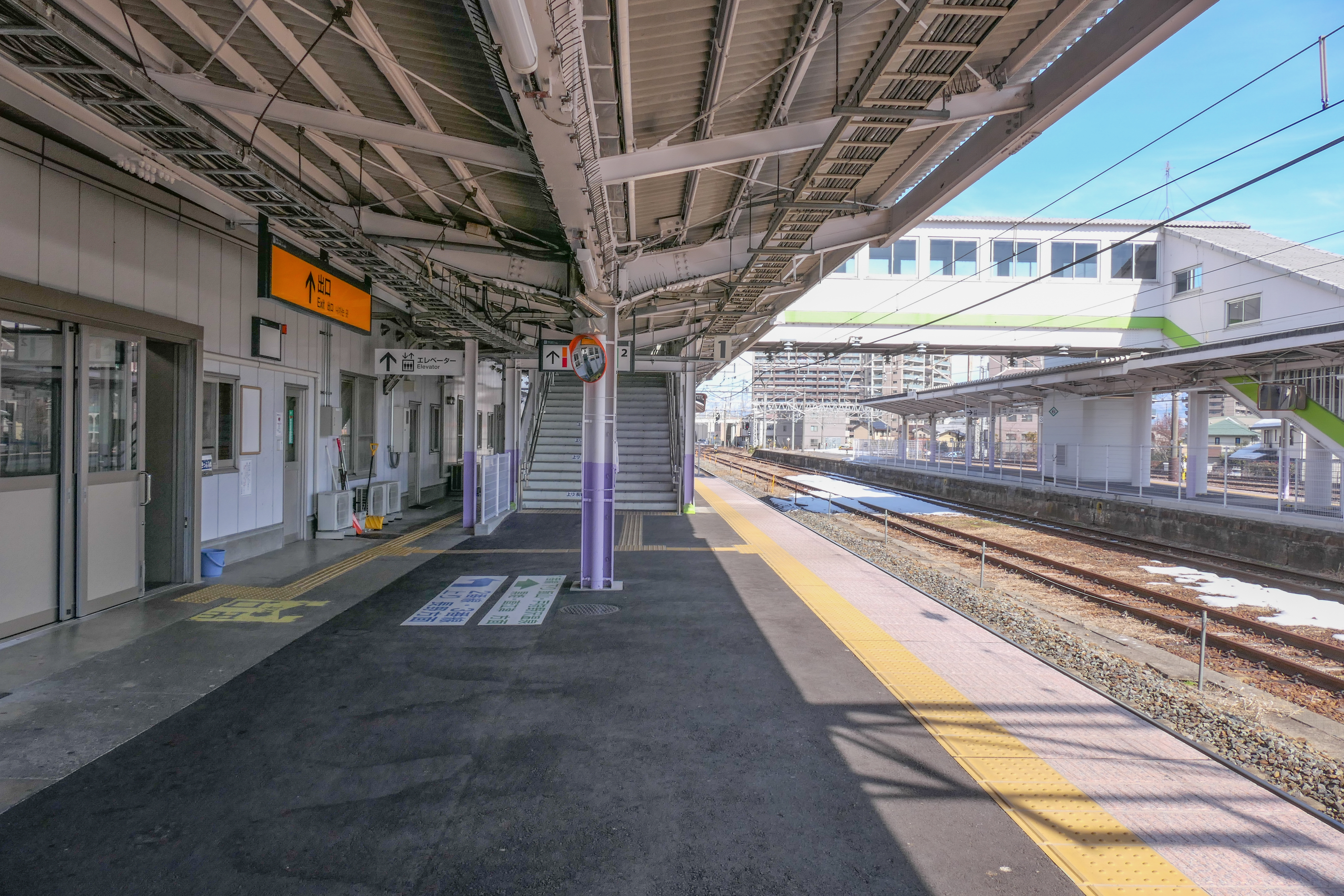
Station platform, February 2022

Kita-Nagano Station (北長野駅, Kita-Nagano-eki) is a railway station on the Shinano Railway Kita-Shinano Line in Nakagoe, in the city of Nagano, Japan, operated by the third-sector railway operating company Shinano Railway. It is also a freight terminal for the Japan Freight Railway Company.

== Lines ==
Kita-Nagano Station is served by the 37.3 km Kita-Shinano Line, and is 3.9 kilometers from the starting point of the line at Nagano Station. Some trains of the Iiyama Line continue past the nominal terminus of the line at Toyono Station and terminate at Nagano Station, stopping at this station en route.

== Station layout ==
The station consists of one elevated side platform and one elevated island platform serving three tracks, with the station building located underneath

=== Platforms ===
1	■ Kita-Shinano Line	for Toyono and Myōkō-Kōgen
1	■ Iiyama Line	for Togari-Nozawaonsen, Tōkamachi, and Echigo-Kawaguchi
2	■ Kita-Shinano Line	(Not normally used)
3	■ Kita-Shinano Line	for Nagano

== History ==
The station opened on 1 September 1898 as Yoshida Station (吉田駅). It was renamed Kita-Nagano Station on 1 April 1957. With the privatization of Japanese National Railways (JNR) on 1 April 1987, the station came under the control of East Japan Railway Company (JR East).

From 14 March 2015, with the opening of the Hokuriku Shinkansen extension from Nagano to Kanazawa, local passenger operations over sections of the Shinetsu Main Line and Hokuriku Main Line running roughly parallel to the new Shinkansen line were reassigned to third-sector railway operating companies. From this date, Kita-Nagano Station was transferred to the ownership of the third-sector operating company Shinano Railway.

== Passenger statistics ==
In fiscal 2016, the station was used by an average of 2,187 passengers daily (boarding passengers only).

== Surrounding area ==
- Yoshida Elementary School
- Nagano Sports Park is approximately 20 minutes away on foot

== See also ==
- List of railway stations in Japan
