= Kurohime Station =

Railway station in Shinano, Nagano Prefecture, Japan

Kurohime Station 黒姫駅
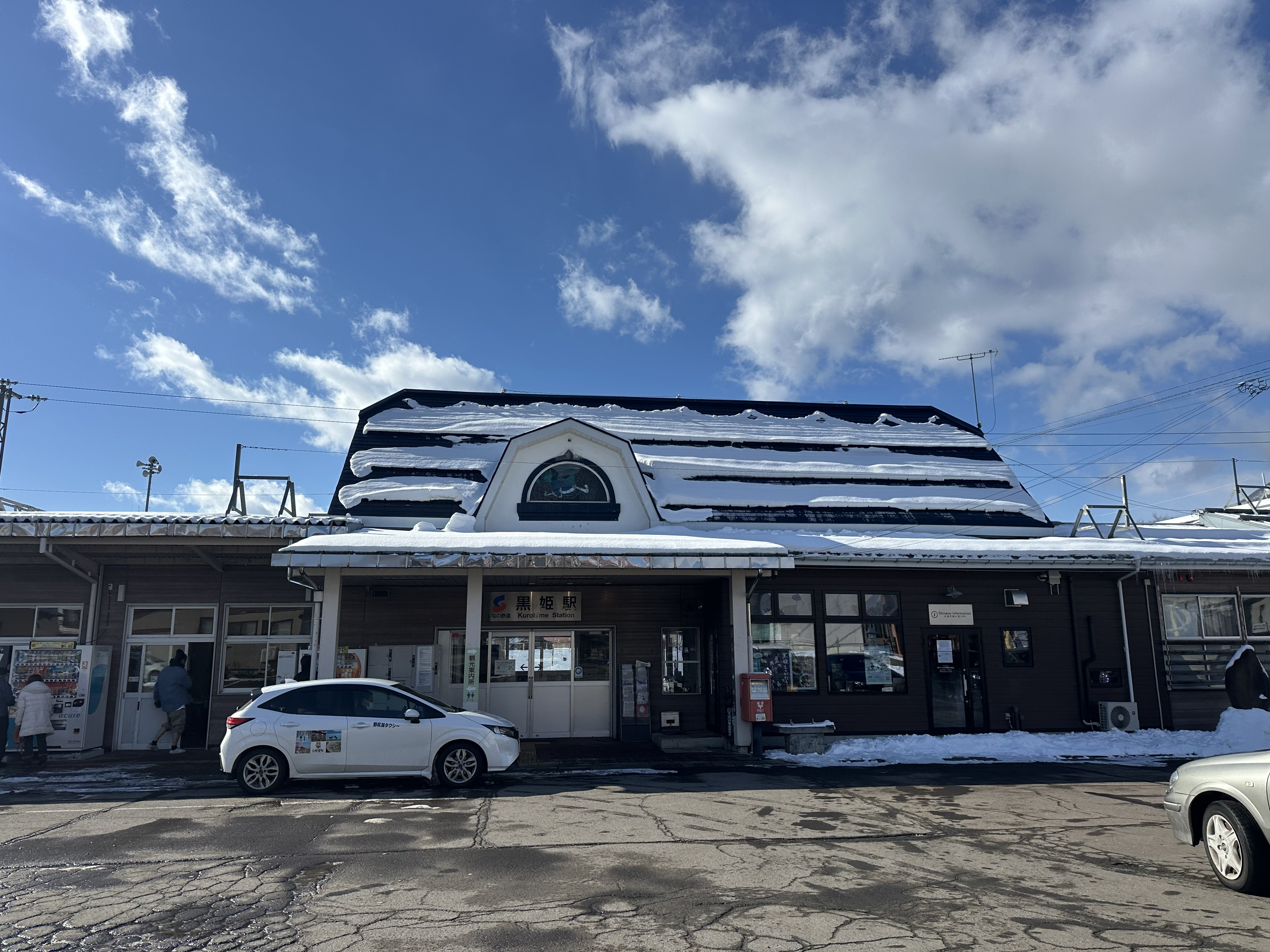
- Kurohime Station in January 2025

General information
- Location: 2711 Kashiwabara, Shinano-machi, Kamiminochi-gun, Nagano-ken 389-1305; Japan
- Coordinates: 36.8073°N 138.1972°E
- Elevation: 671.8 metres (2,204 ft)
- Operator: Shinano Railway
- Line: ■ Kita-Shinano Line
- Distance: 28.9 kilometres (18.0 mi) from Nagano
- Platforms: 1 side + 1 island platform
- Tracks: 3

Other information
- Website: Official website

History
- Opened: 1 May 1888
- Former names: Kashiwabara Station (until 1968)

Passengers
- FY2020: 195
Location
- Location within Japan

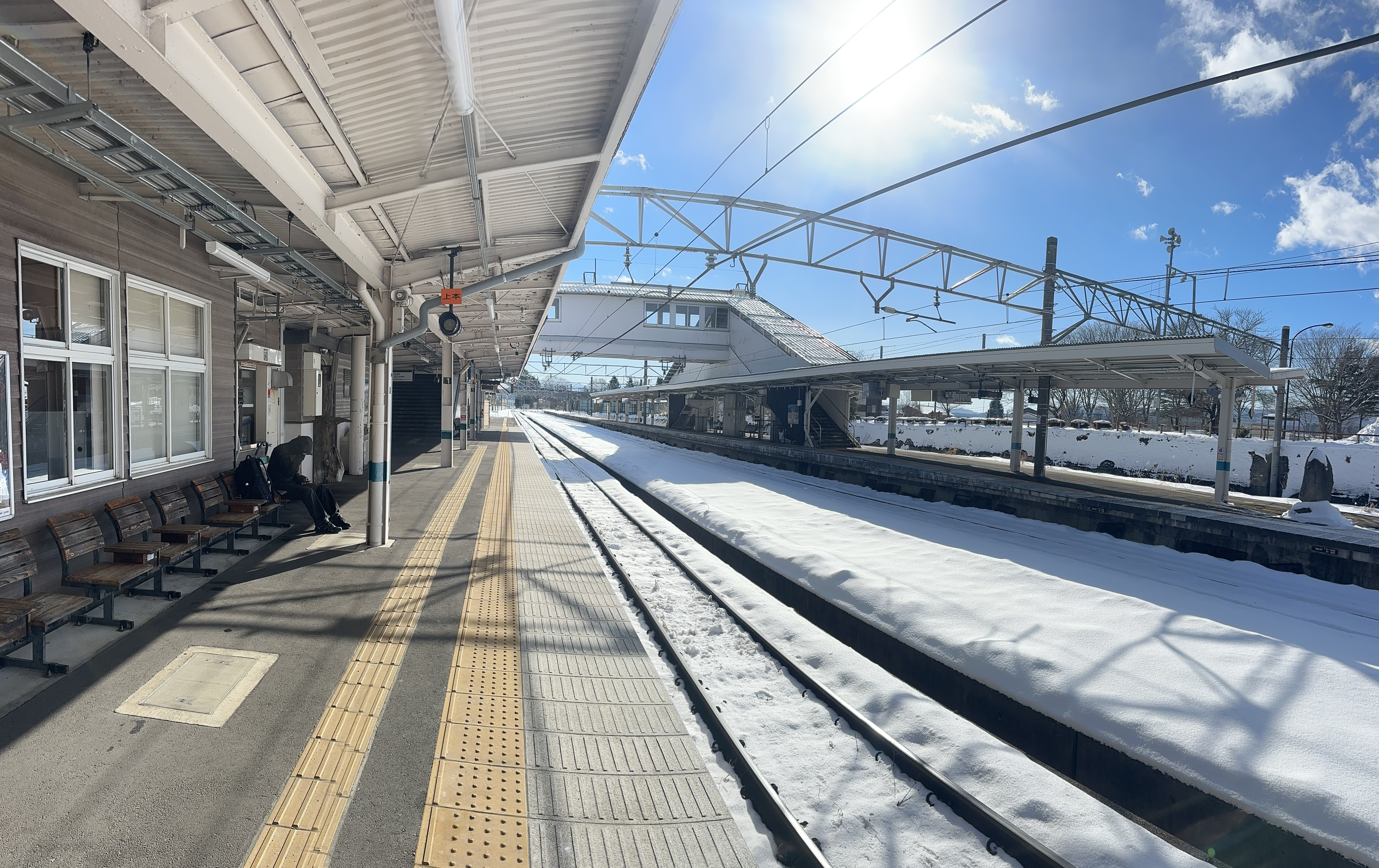
Station platforms

Kurohime Station (黒姫駅, Kurohime-eki) is a railway station on the Shinano Railway Kita-Shinano Line in Kashiwabara in the town of Shinano, Nagano, Japan, operated by the third-sector railway operator Shinano Railway.

== Lines ==
Kurohime Station is served by the 37.3 km Shinano Railway Kita-Shinano Line and is 28.9 kilometers from the starting point of the line at Nagano Station.

== Station layout ==
The station consists of one ground-level side platform and one island platform connected by a footbridge.

=== Platforms ===
1	■ Kita-Shinano Line	for Nagano
2/3	■ Kita-Shinano Line	for Myōkō-Kōgen

== Adjacent stations ==
←	Service	→
Kita-Shinano Line
Furuma	Local	Myōkō-Kōgen

== History ==
The station opened on 1 May 1888 as Kashiwabara Station (柏原駅). It was renamed Kurohime on 1 October 1968. With the privatization of Japanese National Railways (JNR) on 1 April 1987, the station came under the control of East Japan Railway Company (JR East).

From 14 March 2015, with the opening of the Hokuriku Shinkansen extension from Nagano to Kanazawa, local passenger operations over sections of the Shinetsu Main Line and Hokuriku Main Line running roughly parallel to the new shinkansen line were reassigned to third-sector railway operating companies. From this date, Kurohime Station was transferred to the ownership of the third-sector operating company Shinano Railway.

== Passenger statistics ==
In fiscal 2020, the station was used by an average of 195 passengers daily (boarding passengers only).

== Surrounding area ==
- Shinano Town Hall
- Shinano Post Office
- National Route 18

== See also ==
- List of railway stations in Japan
