= Furuma Station =

Railway station in Shinano, Nagano Prefecture, Japan

Furuma Station 古間駅
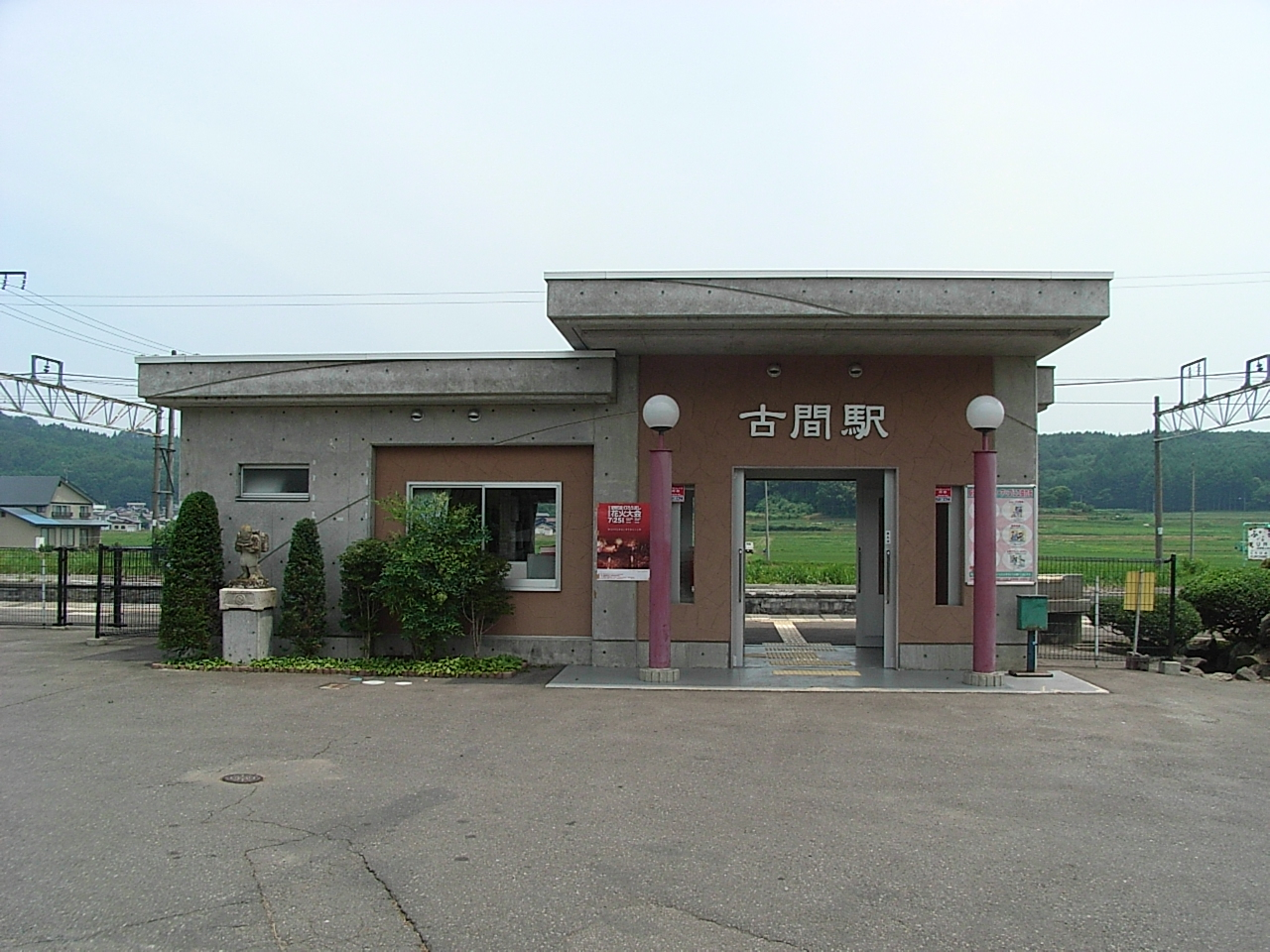
- Furuma Station in June 2009

General information
- Location: 409 Tomino, Shinano-machi, Kamiminochi-gun, Nagano-ken 389-1312; Japan
- Coordinates: 36.7923°N 138.2307°E
- Elevation: 633.2 metres (2,077 ft)
- Operator: Shinano Railway
- Line: ■ Kita-Shinano Line
- Distance: 25.1 kilometres (15.6 mi) from Nagano
- Platforms: 1 side platform
- Tracks: 1

Other information
- Website: Official website

History
- Opened: 23 December 1928

Passengers
- FY2013: 118
Location
- Location within Nagano Prefecture Location within Japan

Furuma Station (古間駅, Furuma-eki) is a railway station on the Shinano Railway Kita-Shinano Line in the town of Shinano, Nagano, Japan, operated by the third-sector railway operator Shinano Railway.

== Lines ==
Furama Station is served by the 37.3 km Kita-Shinano Line and is 25.1 kilometers from the starting point of the line at Nagano Station.

== Station layout ==
The station has one ground-level side platform serving a single bi-directional track. The station is unattended.

== Adjacent stations ==
←	Service	→
Kita-Shinano Line
Mure	Local	Kurohime

== History ==
The station opened on 23 December 1928. With the privatization of Japanese National Railways (JNR) on 1 April 1987, the station came under the control of East Japan Railway Company (JR East).

From 14 March 2015, with the opening of the Hokuriku Shinkansen extension from Nagano to Kanazawa, local passenger operations over sections of the Shinetsu Main Line and Hokuriku Main Line running roughly parallel to the new Shinkansen line were reassigned to third-sector railway operating companies. From this date, Furuma Station was transferred to the ownership of the third-sector operating company Shinano Railway.

== Passenger statistics ==
In fiscal 2013, while still under the control of JR East, the station was used by an average of 118 passengers daily (boarding passengers only).

== Surrounding area ==
- Furuma Post Office

== See also ==
- List of railway stations in Japan
