= Nihongi Station =

Railway station in Jōetsu, Niigata Prefecture, Japan

Nihongi Station 二本木駅
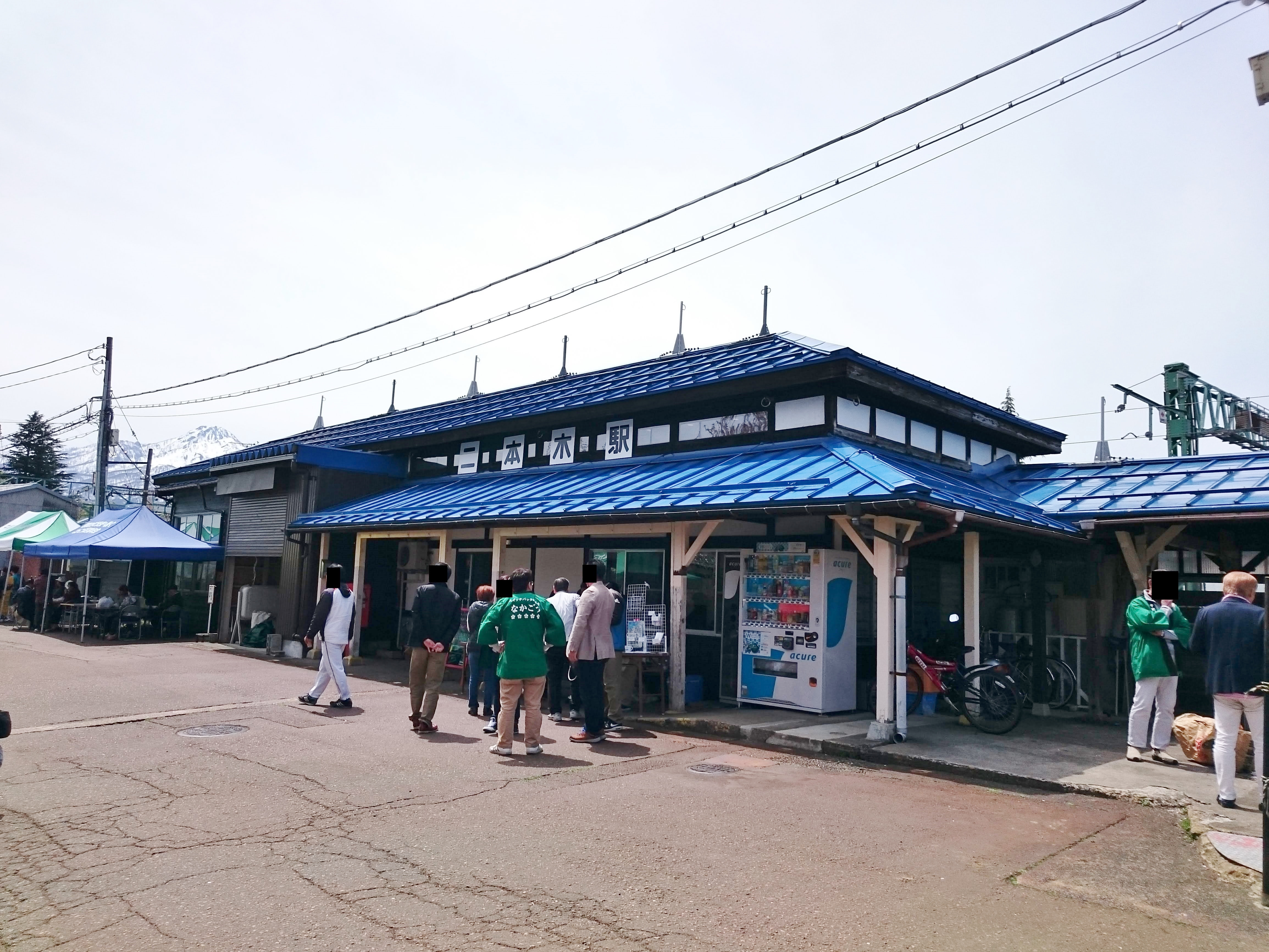
- Nihongi Station in April 2019

General information
- Location: 552 Itabashi, Nakasato-ku, Jōetsu-shi, Niigata-ken 949-2301; Japan
- Coordinates: 36°59′22″N 138°13′57″E
- Operator: Echigo Tokimeki Railway; JR Freight
- Line: ■ Myoko Haneuma Line
- Distance: 14.7 kilometres (9.1 mi) from Myōkō-Kōgen
- Platforms: 1 island platform
- Tracks: 2

Other information
- Status: staffed
- Website: Official website

History
- Opened: 1 May 1911

Passengers
- FY2017: 140 daily
Location
- Location within Myoko Haneuma Line Location within Japan

Nihongi Station (二本木駅, Nihongi-eki) is a railway station on the Echigo Tokimeki Railway Myōkō Haneuma Line in the city of Jōetsu, Niigata, Japan, operated by the third-sector operator Echigo Tokimeki Railway. It is also a freight terminal for the Japan Freight Railway Company.

== Lines ==
Nihongi Station is served by the 37.7 km Echigo Tokimeki Railway Myōkō Haneuma Line from Myōkō-Kōgen to Naoetsu, and is located 14.7 kilometers from the starting point of the line at Myōkō-Kōgen and 52.0 kilometers from Nagano.

== Station layout ==
The station has one island platform, connected to the station building by an underground passage. This station has a zig zag.

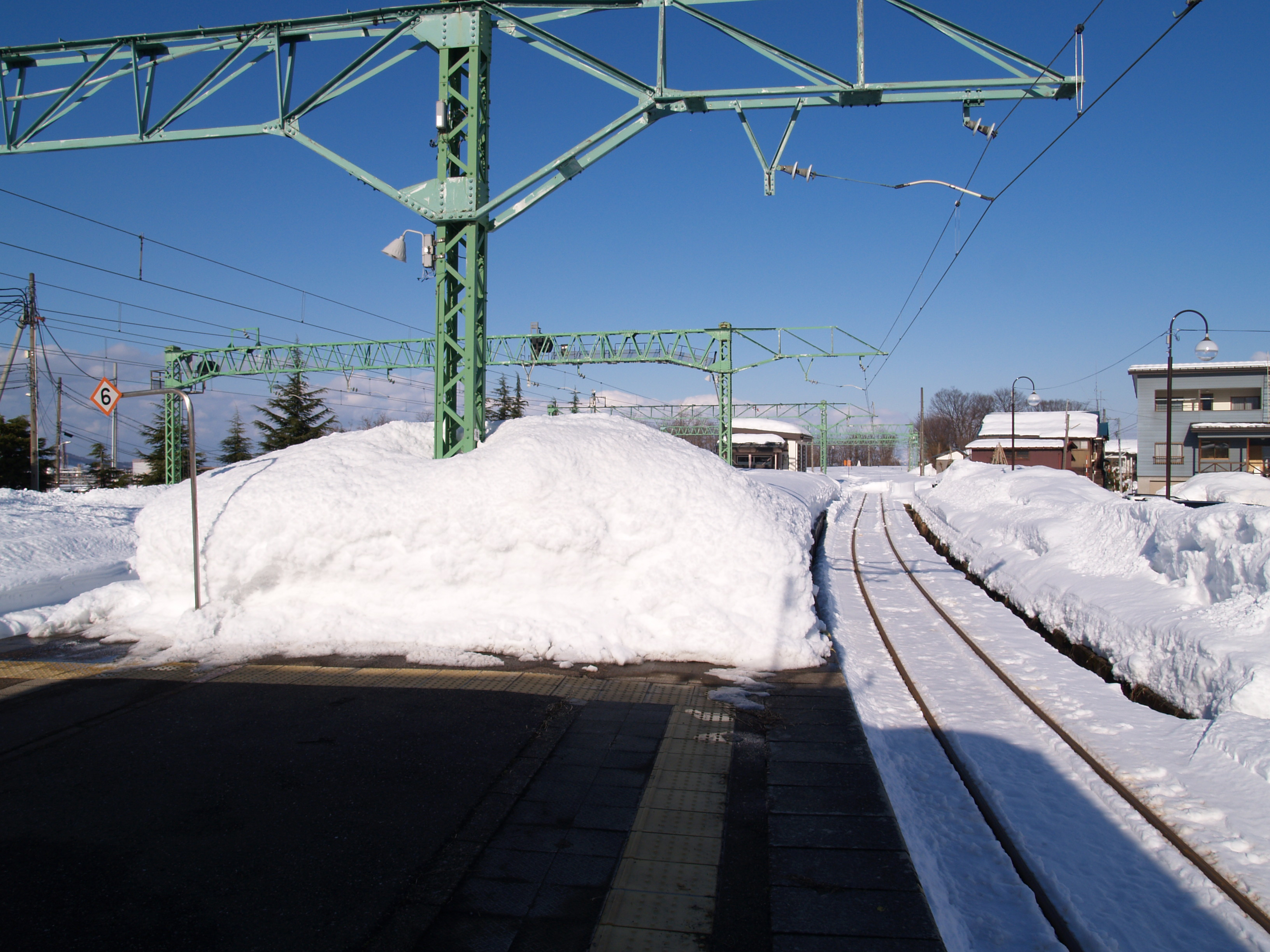
The platform in January 2010

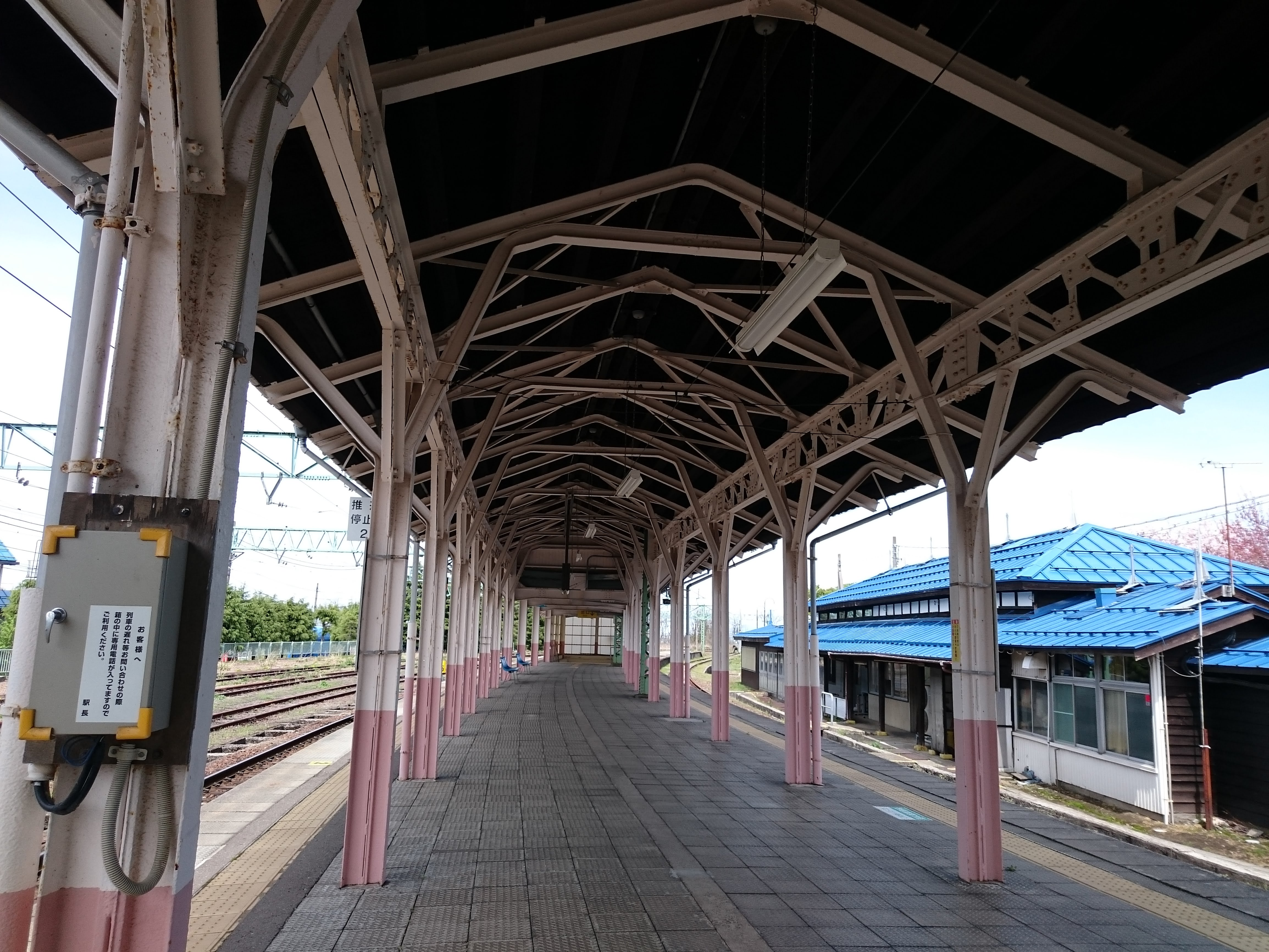
The platform in April 2019

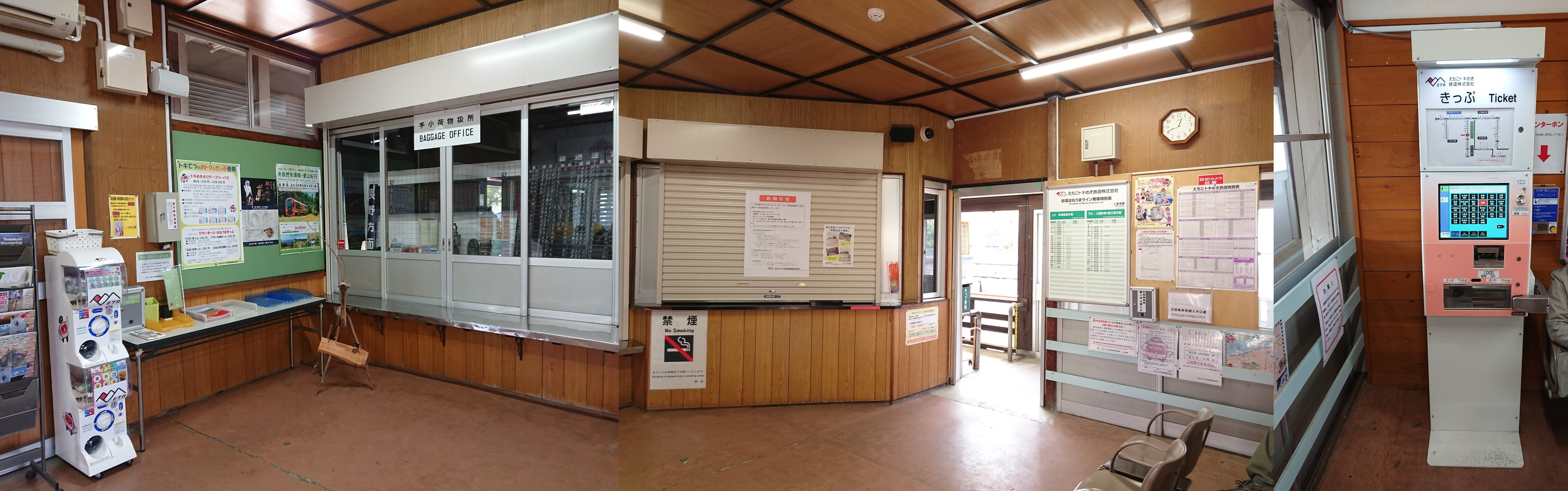
Station interior, April 2019

=== Platforms ===
1	■ Myōkō Haneuma Line	for Myōkō-Kōgen
2	■ Myōkō Haneuma Line	for Naoetsu

== Adjacent stations ==
«	Service	»
Myōkō Haneuma Line
Sekiyama	Local	Arai

== History ==
The station opened on 1 May 1911. With the privatization of Japanese National Railways (JNR) on 1 April 1987, the station came under the control of JR East. From 14 March 2015, with the opening of the Hokuriku Shinkansen extension from Nagano to Kanazawa, local passenger operations over sections of the Shinetsu Main Line and Hokuriku Main Line running roughly parallel to the new shinkansen line were reassigned to third-sector railway operating companies. From this date, Nihongi Station was transferred to the ownership of the third-sector operating company Echigo Tokimeki Railway.

== Passenger statistics ==
In fiscal 2017, the station was used by an average of 140 passengers daily (boarding passengers only).

== Surrounding area ==
- Former Nakago village hall
- Nakago Elementary School
- Nakago Junior High School
- Nakago Post Office

== See also ==
- List of railway stations in Japan
