= Shinano, Nagano =

Shinano 信濃町
- Town
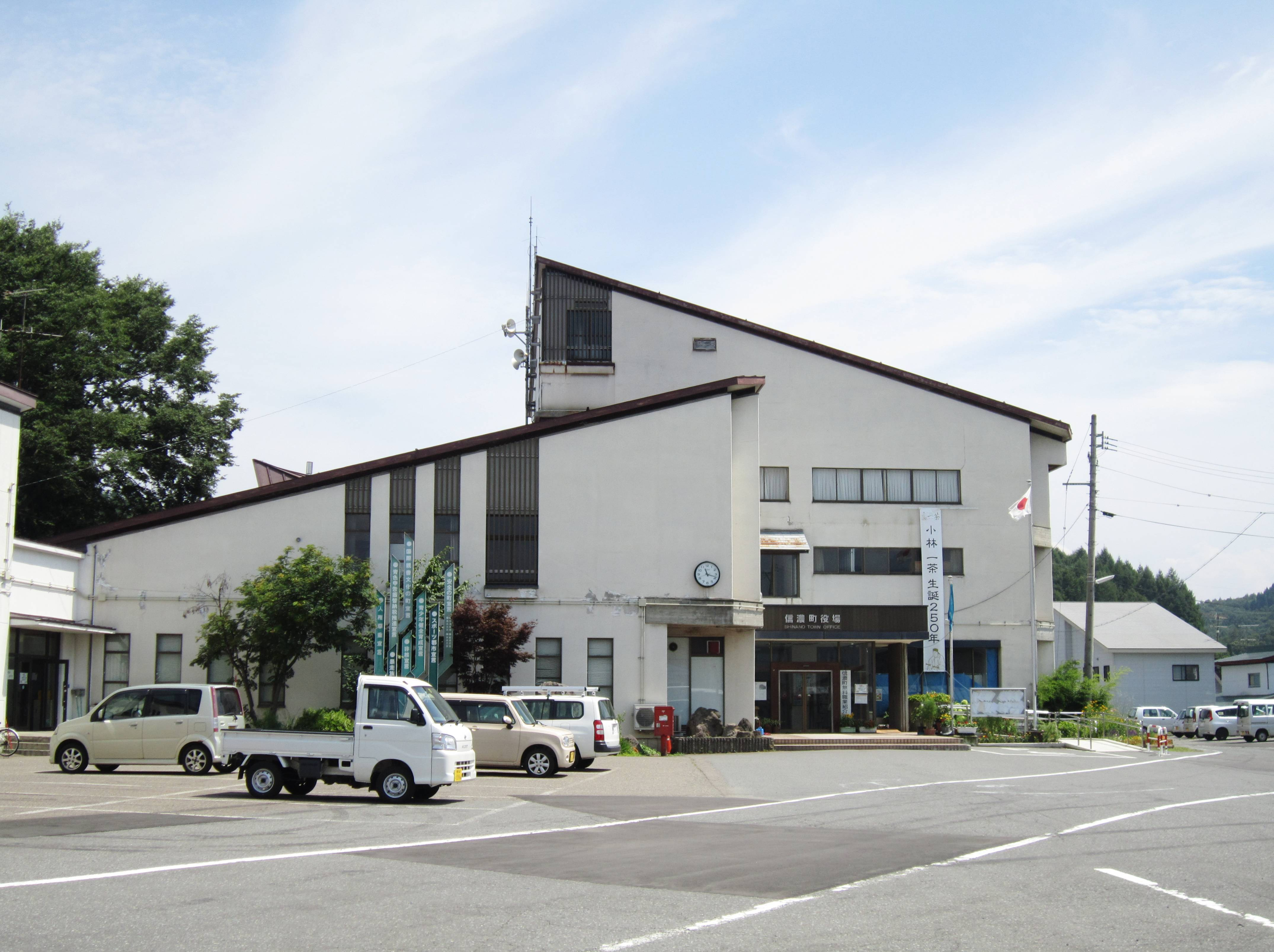
- Shinano Town Hall

- Flag Seal

- Location of Shinano in Nagano Prefecture

- Coordinates: 36°48′22.7″N 138°12′25.3″E
- Country: Japan
- Region: Chūbu (Kōshin'etsu)
- Prefecture: Nagano
- District: Kamiminochi

Area
  - Total: 149.30 km^{2} (57.65 sq mi)

Population (March 2019)
  - Total: 8,339
  - Density: 55.85/km^{2} (144.7/sq mi)
- Time zone: UTC+9 (Japan Standard Time)
- Phone number: 026-255-3111
- Address: 428-2 Kashiwabara, Shinano-machi, Kamiminochi-gun, Nagano-ken 389-1305
- Climate: Dfa
- Website: Official website
- Symbols
- Bird: Japanese bush warbler
- Flower: Cosmos
- Tree: Prunus sargentii

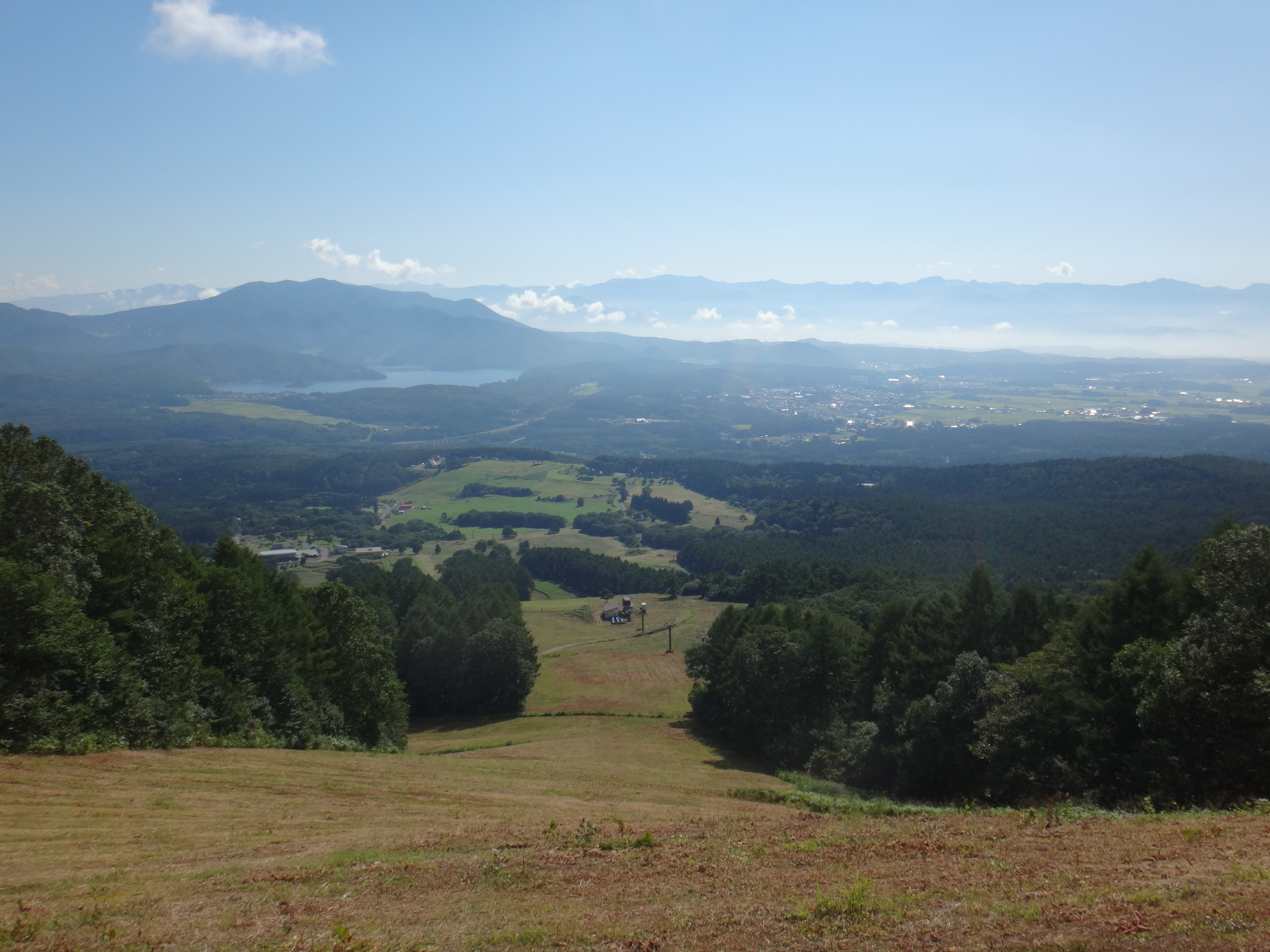
View of Shinano Town. Mount Madarao and Lake Nojiri on the left.

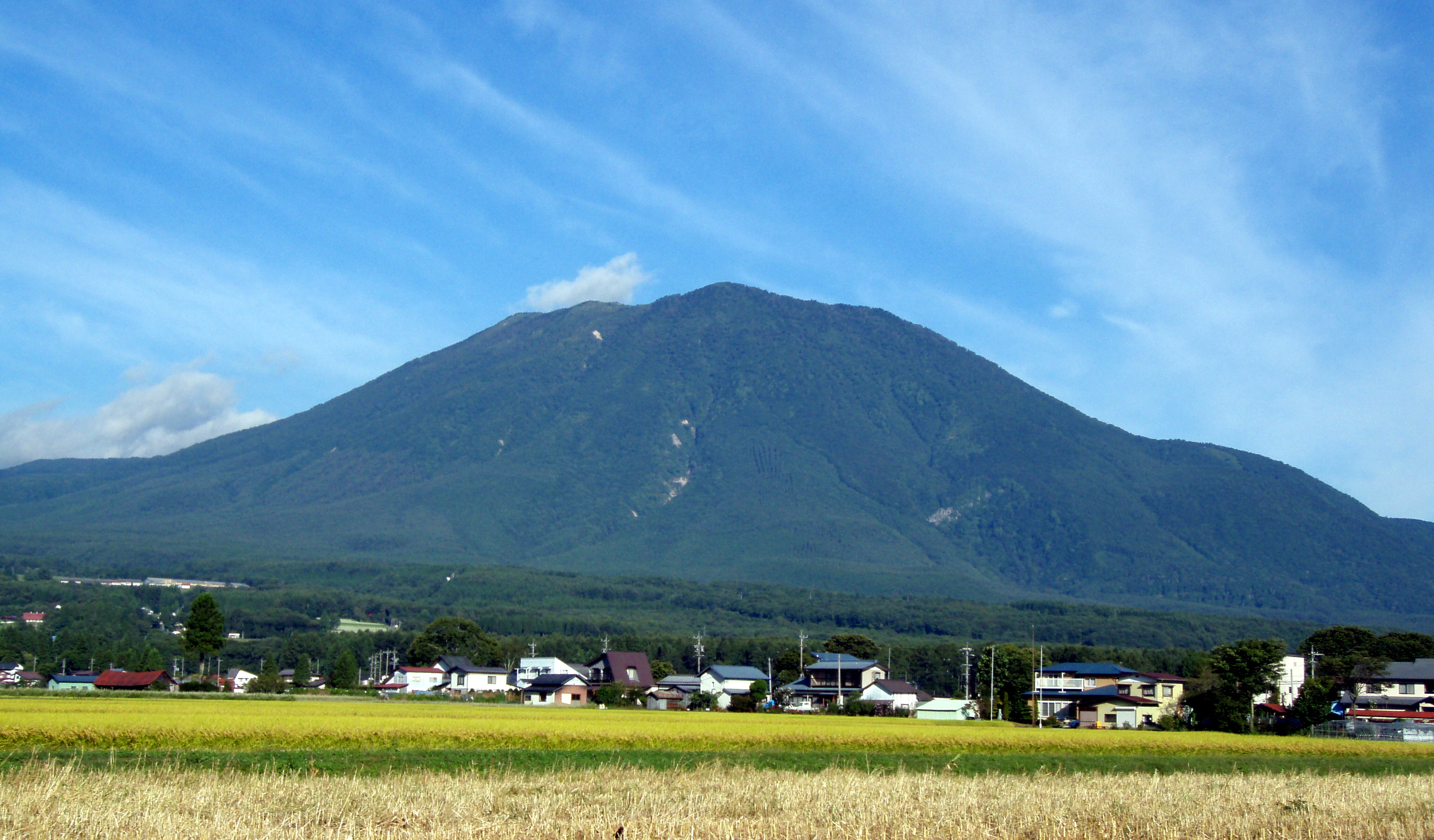
Kurohime Volcano is one of the symbols of Shinano.

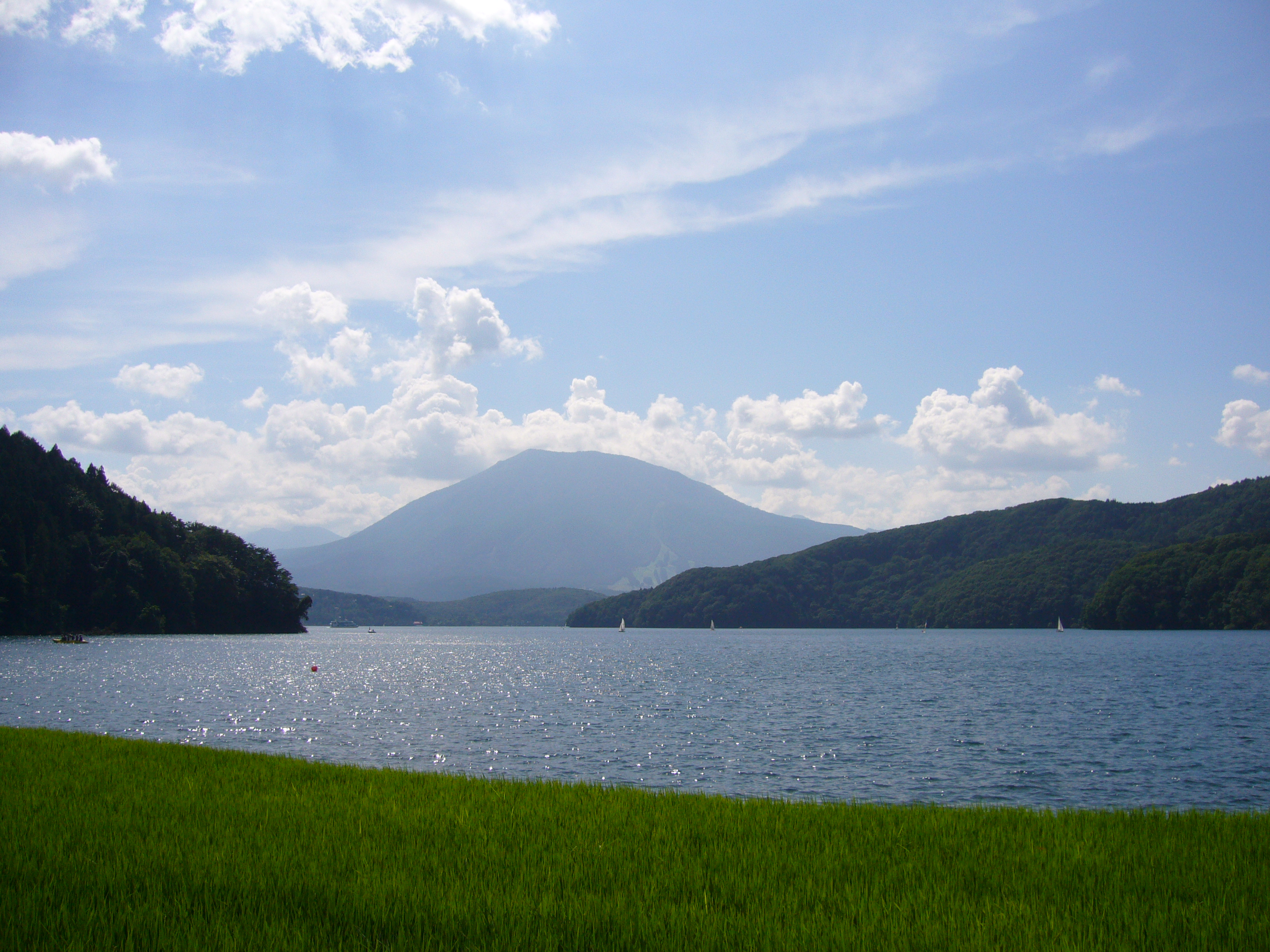
Lake Nojiri is one of the symbols of Shinano. Kurohime Volcano in the background.

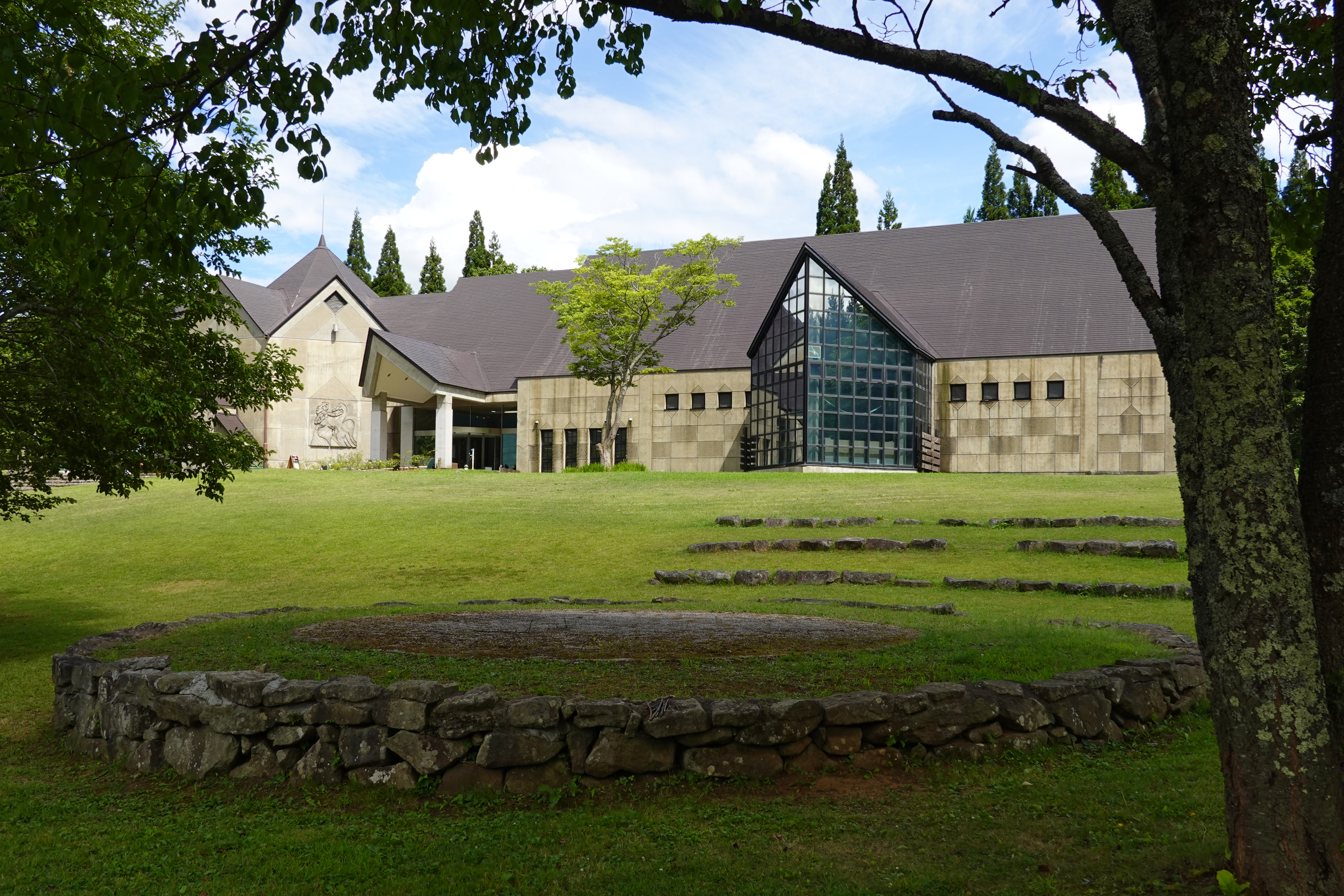
Kurohime Fairy Tale Museum

Shinano (信濃町, Shinano-machi) is a town located in Nagano Prefecture, Japan. As of 31 March 2019, the town had an estimated population of 8,339 in 3351 households, and a population density of 56 persons per km^{2}. The total area of the town is 149.30 square kilometres (57.65 sq mi).

== History ==
The area of present-day Shinano was part of ancient Shinano Province. The modern village of Shinano was created by the merger of the villages of Kashiwabara and Fujisato on July 1, 1955. Shinano merged with the neighboring villages of Furuma and Shinanojiri to form the town of Shinano on September 30, 1956.

== Geography ==
Shinano is located in far northern Nagano Prefecture, bordered by Niigata Prefecture to the north. Lake Nojiri and Mount Kurohime are in Shinano.

=== Surrounding municipalities ===
- Nagano Prefecture
  - Iiyama
  - Iizuna
  - Nagano
- Niigata Prefecture
  - Myōkō

=== Climate ===
The town has a humid continental climate characterized by characterized by short, hot and humid summers, and cold winters with heavy snowfall (Köppen climate classification Cfa). The average annual temperature in Shinano is 9.4 °C (48.9 °F). The average annual rainfall is 1,275.1 mm (50.20 in) with July as the wettest month. The temperatures are highest on average in August, at around 22.3 °C (72.1 °F), and lowest in January, at around −2.9 °C (26.8 °F).

Climate data for Shinano (1991−2020 normals, extremes 1978−present)
| Month | Jan | Feb | Mar | Apr | May | Jun | Jul | Aug | Sep | Oct | Nov | Dec | Year |
|---|---|---|---|---|---|---|---|---|---|---|---|---|---|
| Record high °C (°F) | 13.1 (55.6) | 16.6 (61.9) | 20.9 (69.6) | 27.4 (81.3) | 29.4 (84.9) | 31.9 (89.4) | 33.4 (92.1) | 34.6 (94.3) | 33.0 (91.4) | 28.7 (83.7) | 22.5 (72.5) | 20.6 (69.1) | 34.6 (94.3) |
| Mean daily maximum °C (°F) | 1.3 (34.3) | 2.1 (35.8) | 6.2 (43.2) | 13.6 (56.5) | 19.6 (67.3) | 22.5 (72.5) | 26.1 (79.0) | 27.5 (81.5) | 23.2 (73.8) | 17.1 (62.8) | 11.1 (52.0) | 4.6 (40.3) | 14.6 (58.2) |
| Daily mean °C (°F) | −2.9 (26.8) | −2.5 (27.5) | 1.1 (34.0) | 7.5 (45.5) | 13.4 (56.1) | 17.3 (63.1) | 21.3 (70.3) | 22.3 (72.1) | 18.2 (64.8) | 11.9 (53.4) | 5.6 (42.1) | 0.0 (32.0) | 9.4 (49.0) |
| Mean daily minimum °C (°F) | −7.7 (18.1) | −7.6 (18.3) | −3.9 (25.0) | 1.8 (35.2) | 7.8 (46.0) | 13.2 (55.8) | 17.8 (64.0) | 18.6 (65.5) | 14.2 (57.6) | 7.3 (45.1) | 0.8 (33.4) | −4.3 (24.3) | 4.8 (40.7) |
| Record low °C (°F) | −18.7 (−1.7) | −18.2 (−0.8) | −16.2 (2.8) | −11.8 (10.8) | −2.1 (28.2) | 3.1 (37.6) | 9.2 (48.6) | 10.0 (50.0) | 2.0 (35.6) | −3.3 (26.1) | −11.3 (11.7) | −17.6 (0.3) | −18.7 (−1.7) |
| Average precipitation mm (inches) | 109.1 (4.30) | 87.8 (3.46) | 90.1 (3.55) | 67.1 (2.64) | 78.4 (3.09) | 118.3 (4.66) | 177.9 (7.00) | 128.1 (5.04) | 135.6 (5.34) | 111.5 (4.39) | 72.6 (2.86) | 98.7 (3.89) | 1,275.1 (50.20) |
| Average snowfall cm (inches) | 241 (95) | 189 (74) | 123 (48) | 12 (4.7) | 0 (0) | 0 (0) | 0 (0) | 0 (0) | 0 (0) | 0 (0) | 12 (4.7) | 149 (59) | 726 (286) |
| Average precipitation days (≥ 1.0 mm) | 17.9 | 15.2 | 14.8 | 10.7 | 10.4 | 11.7 | 14.5 | 11.6 | 11.6 | 10.7 | 11.4 | 16.3 | 156.8 |
| Average snowy days (≥ 3 cm) | 20.5 | 17.4 | 13.9 | 1.8 | 0 | 0 | 0 | 0 | 0 | 0 | 1.3 | 12.3 | 67.2 |
| Mean monthly sunshine hours | 69.7 | 89.8 | 128.1 | 174.3 | 190.5 | 139.9 | 133.7 | 172.4 | 123.4 | 123.8 | 110.0 | 87.9 | 1,543.5 |
Source: Japan Meteorological Agency

== Demographics ==
Per Japanese census data, the population of Shinano has declined over the past 70 years.

Historical population
| Year | Pop. | ±% |
|---|---|---|
| 1940 | 11,382 | — |
| 1950 | 14,843 | +30.4% |
| 1960 | 13,703 | −7.7% |
| 1970 | 12,301 | −10.2% |
| 1980 | 11,857 | −3.6% |
| 1990 | 11,552 | −2.6% |
| 2000 | 10,391 | −10.1% |
| 2010 | 9,239 | −11.1% |
| 2020 | 7,739 | −16.2% |

== Education ==
Shinano has one combined public elementary/middle school operated by the town government. The town does not have a high school.

== Transportation ==
=== Railway ===
- Shinano Railway - Kita-Shinano Line
  - Kurohime - Furuma

=== Highway ===
- Jōshin-etsu Expressway
- National Route 18

== Local attractions ==
- Lake Nojiri
- Naena Falls, one of the 100 Waterfalls of Japan
- Lake Nojiri Naumann Elephant Museum
- Kurohime Fairy Tale Museum

== Notable people from Shinano ==
- Kobayashi Issa, poet

== Administrators ==
Mayors

- 1st generation- Shigeichiro Matsuki (October 1956-4th quarter of November 1970)
- 2nd generation- Kazuo Kobayashi (Nov. 1970-Nov. 4, 1986)
- 3rd generation- Akio Takeuchi (November 1986-November 1, 1990)
- 4th generation- Tadakazu Ogusa (Nov. 1990-Nov. 3, 2002)
- 5th generation- Hiroshi Hattori (November 2002-November 1, 2006)
- 6th generation- Shigehiro Matsuki (Nov. 2006-Nov. 2, 2014)
- 7th generation- Masatomo Yokokawa (November 2014 – present)

=== Town council ===
- Number of lawmakers: 12 (term of office: until March 31, 2021)
- Chair: Moriyama Konomi
- Since January 2013, it has adopted the “Full Year Assembly”
