= Sekiyama Station =

Railway station in Myōkō, Niigata Prefecture, Japan

Sekiyama Station 関山駅
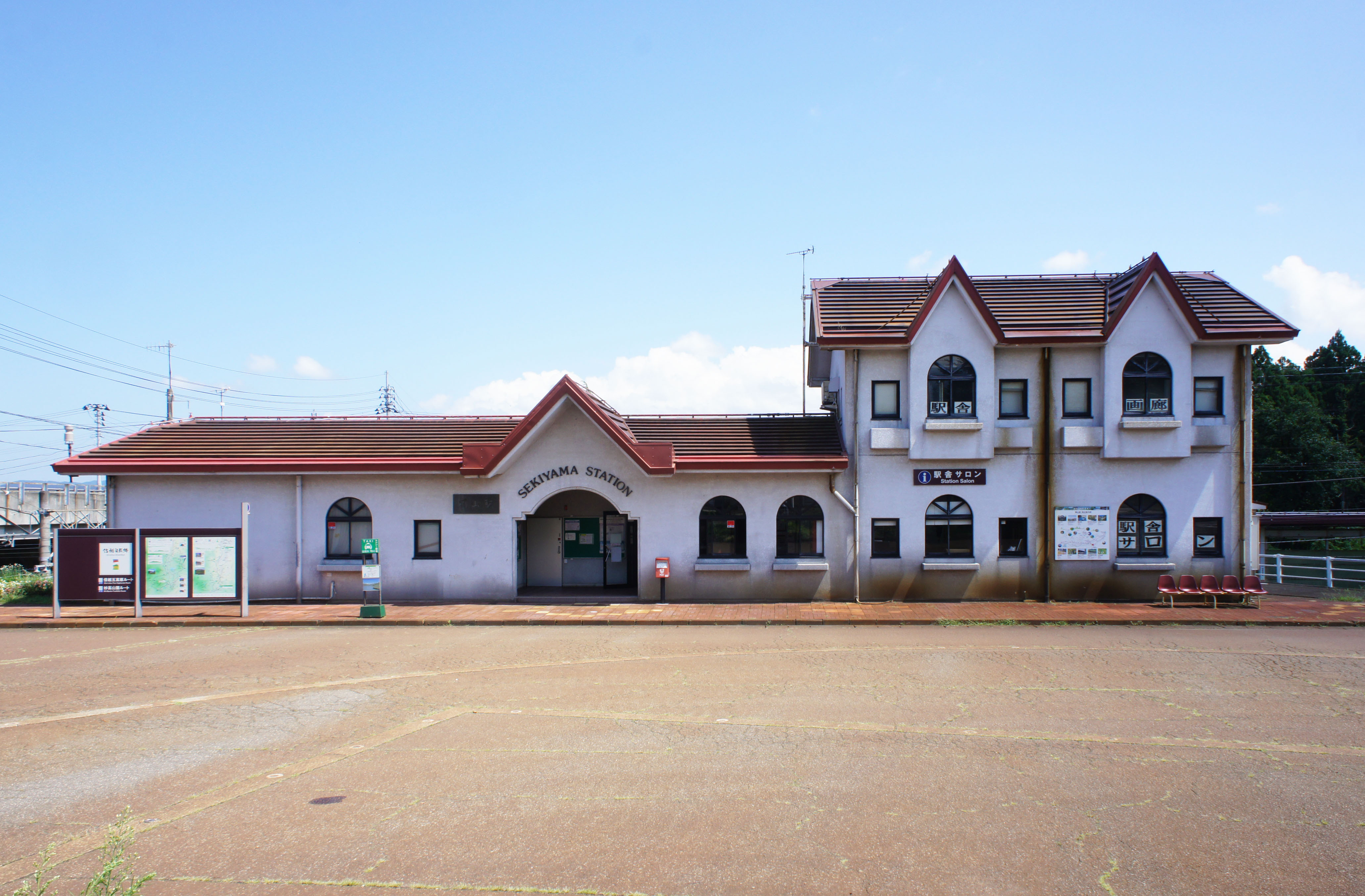
- Sekiyama Station in August 2021

General information
- Location: Sekiyama, Myōkō-shi, Niigata-ken; Japan
- Coordinates: 36.9330°N 138.2265°E
- Operator: Echigo Tokimeki Railway
- Line: ■ Myōkō Haneuma Line
- Distance: 6.4 kilometres (4.0 mi) from Myōkō-Kōgen
- Platforms: 1 island platform
- Tracks: 2

Other information
- Website: Official website

History
- Opened: 15 August 1886

Passengers
- FY2017: 142 daily
Location
- Location within Myoko Haneuma Line Location within Japan

Sekiyama Station (関山駅, Sekiyama-eki) is a railway station on the Myōkō Haneuma Line in Myōkō, Niigata, Japan, operated by the third-sector railway operator Echigo Tokimeki Railway.

== Lines ==
Sekiyama Station is served by the 37.7 km Echigo Tokimeki Railway Myōkō Haneuma Line from Myōkō-Kōgen to Naoetsu, and is located 6.4 kilometers from the starting point of the line at Myōkō-Kōgen and 43.7 kilometers from Nagano.

=== Platforms ===
1	■ Myōkō Haneuma Line	for Takada, Naoetsu, and Niigata
2	■ Myōkō Haneuma Line	for Myōkō-Kōgen

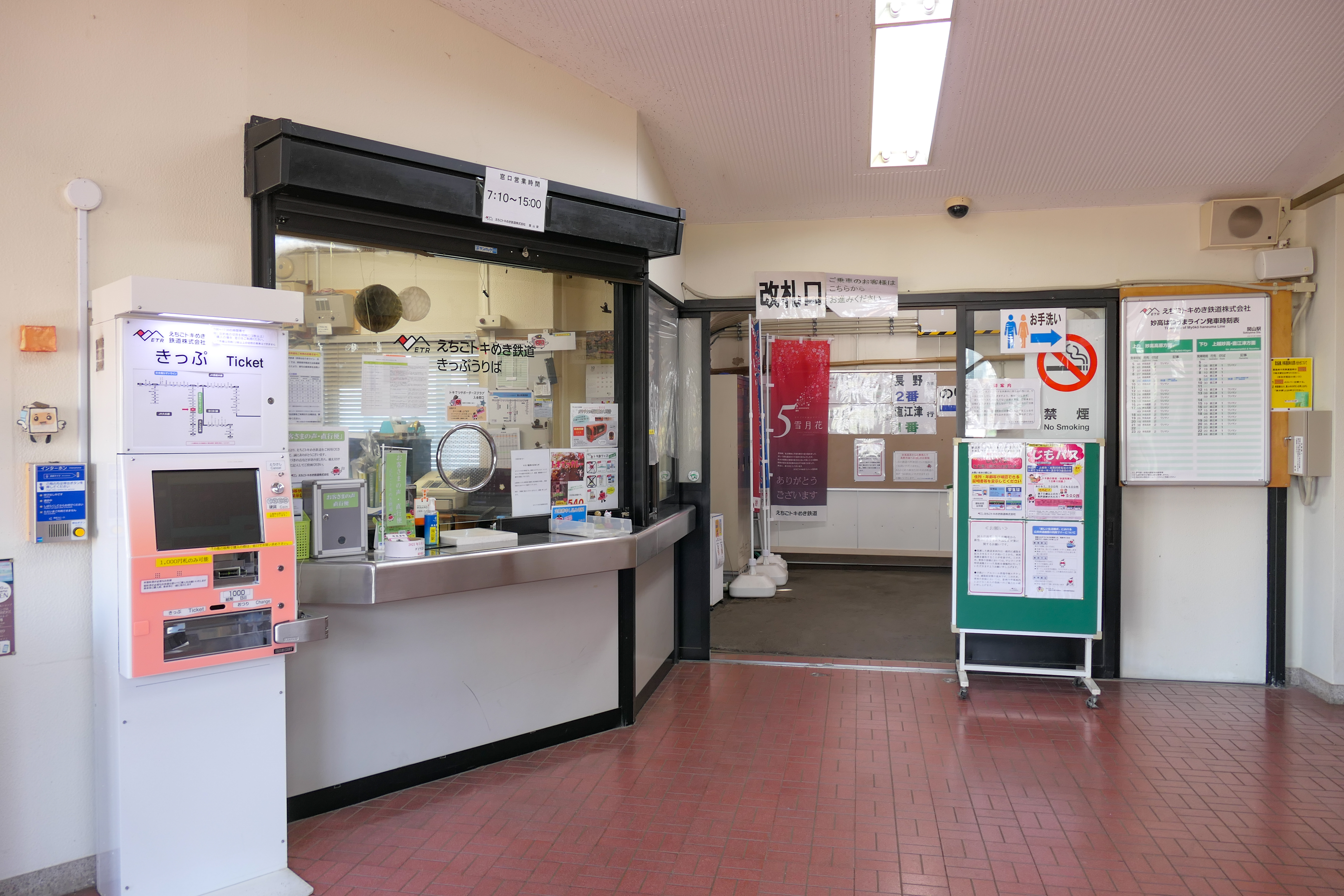
Station interior, October 2021

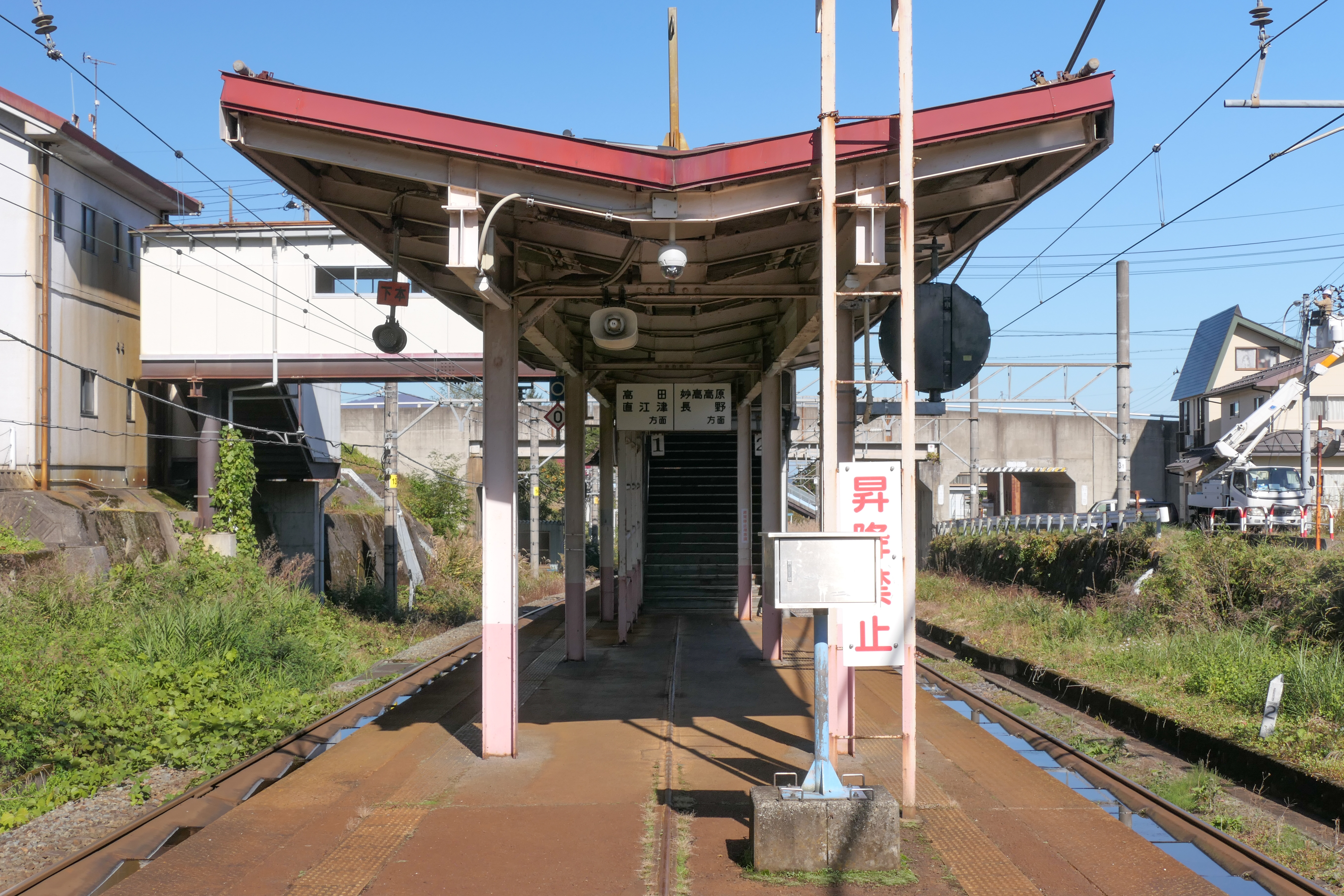
Platform, October 2021

== Adjacent stations ==
«	Service	»
Myōkō Haneuma Line
Myōkō-Kōgen	Local	Nihongi

== History ==
Sekiyama Station opened on 15 August 1886. With the privatization of JNR on 1 April 1987, the station came under the control of JR East.

From 14 March 2015, with the opening of the Hokuriku Shinkansen extension from Nagano to Kanazawa, local passenger operations over sections of the Shinetsu Main Line and Hokuriku Main Line running roughly parallel to the new shinkansen line were reassigned to third-sector railway operating companies. From that date, Sekiyama Station was transferred to the ownership of the third-sector operating company Echigo Tokimeki Railway.

== Passenger statistics ==
In fiscal 2017, the station was used by an average of 142 passengers daily (boarding passengers only).

== Surrounding area ==
- Seki Onsen
- Sekiyama Post Office
- Sekiyama Jinja

== See also ==
- List of railway stations in Japan
