= Kita-Shinano Line =

Railway line in Japan

Shinano Railway Kita-Shinano Line
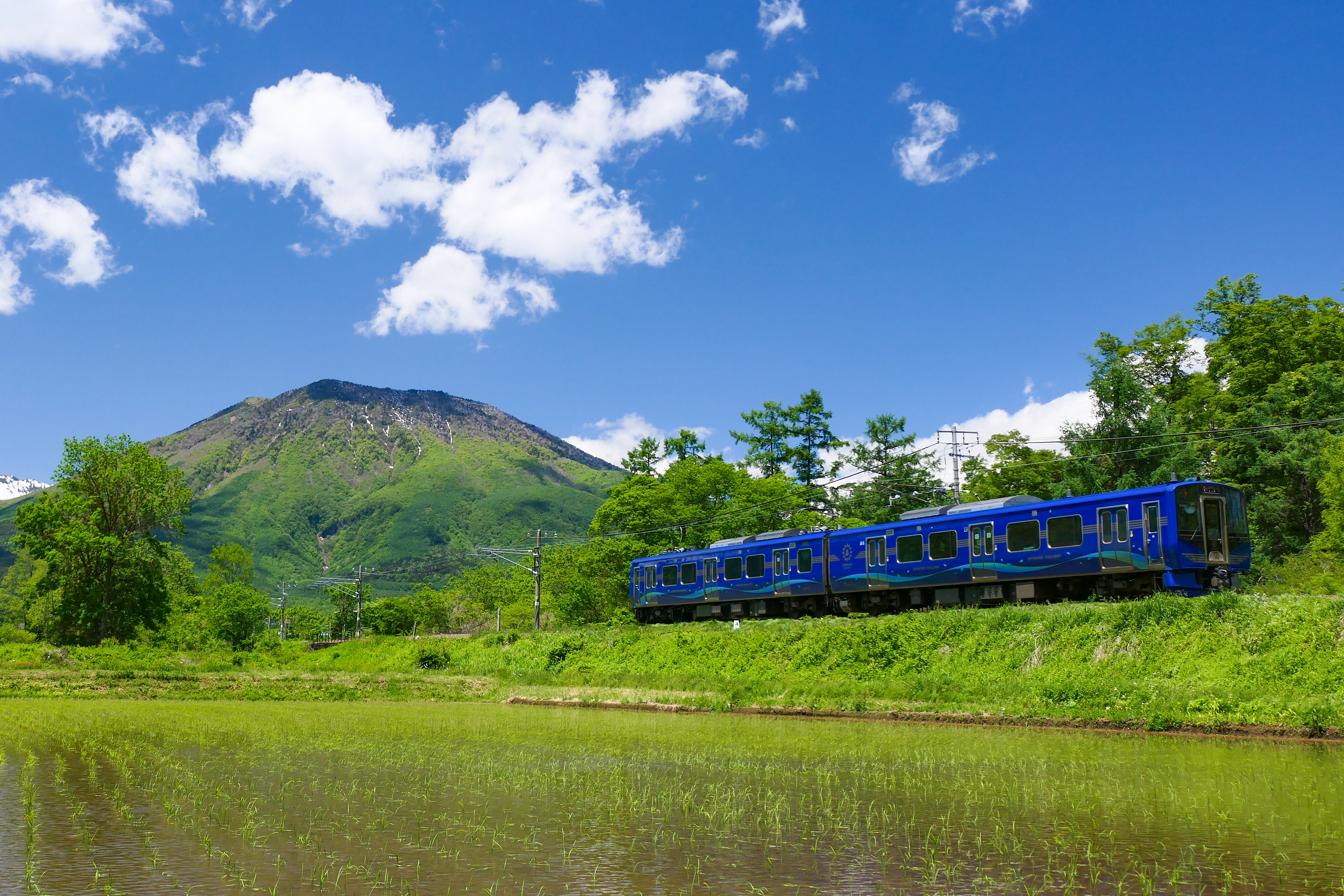
- A Shinano Railway SR1 series EMU, between Furuma and Kurohime

Overview
- Native name: しなの鉄道北しなの線
- Owner: Shinano Railway
- Locale: Nagano Prefecture
- Termini: Nagano; Myōkō-Kōgen
- Stations: 8

Service
- Type: Commuter rail
- Rolling stock: 115 series EMUs

History
- Opened: 1 May 1888; 14 March 2015 (As the private railway line)

Technical
- Line length: 37.3 km (23.2 mi)
- Track gauge: 1,067 mm (3 ft 6 in)
- Electrification: 1,500 V DC

The Shinano Railway Kita-Shinano Line (しなの鉄道北しなの線, Shinano Tetsudō Kita-Shinano-sen) is a 37.3 km (23.2 mi) railway line operated by the third-sector railway operating company Shinano Railway in Nagano Prefecture, Japan, since 14 March 2015 following the opening of the Hokuriku Shinkansen extension north of Nagano and transfer of operations of the former Shinetsu Main Line from East Japan Railway Company (JR East). It connects Nagano Station in Nagano with Myōkō-Kōgen Station in Myōkō, Niigata.

== Service outline ==
All services on the line are all-stations "Local" (普通, Futsū) driver-only operation trains. From the start of operations on the line, there are 21 return workings daily between Nagano and Jōetsumyōkō, and three return workings daily between Nagano and Toyono, an increase in two return services daily compared with JR East operations prior to March 2015. A small number of services continue to and from Komoro on the Shinano Railway Line operated by the same company south of Nagano. In addition to Shinano Railway services, JR East Iiyama Line through-running services to and from Nagano also use the section of the line between Nagano and Toyono. At Myōkō-Kōgen, the northern end of the line, a cross-platform transfer is provided to the Echigo Tokimeki Railway Myōkō Haneuma Line continuing northward along the former Shinetsu Main Line, with Shinano Railway trains normally using platform 2 and Echigo Tokimeki Railway trains normally using platform 3.

== Stations ==
Station	Japanese	Distance (km)	Connections	Location	
Nagano	長野	0.0	Hokuriku Shinkansen; Shinetsu Main Line; Shinano Railway Line; Nagano Electric Railway	Nagano	Nagano Prefecture
Kita-Nagano	北長野	3.9		Nagano	Nagano Prefecture
Sansai	三才	6.8		Nagano	Nagano Prefecture
Toyono	豊野	10.8	■ Iiyama Line	Nagano	Nagano Prefecture
Mure	牟礼	18.6		Iizuna	Nagano Prefecture
Furuma	古間	25.1		Shinano	Nagano Prefecture
Kurohime	黒姫	28.9		Shinano	Nagano Prefecture
Myōkō-Kōgen	妙高高原	37.3	ETR Myōkō Haneuma Line	Myōkō	Niigata Prefecture

== Rolling stock ==
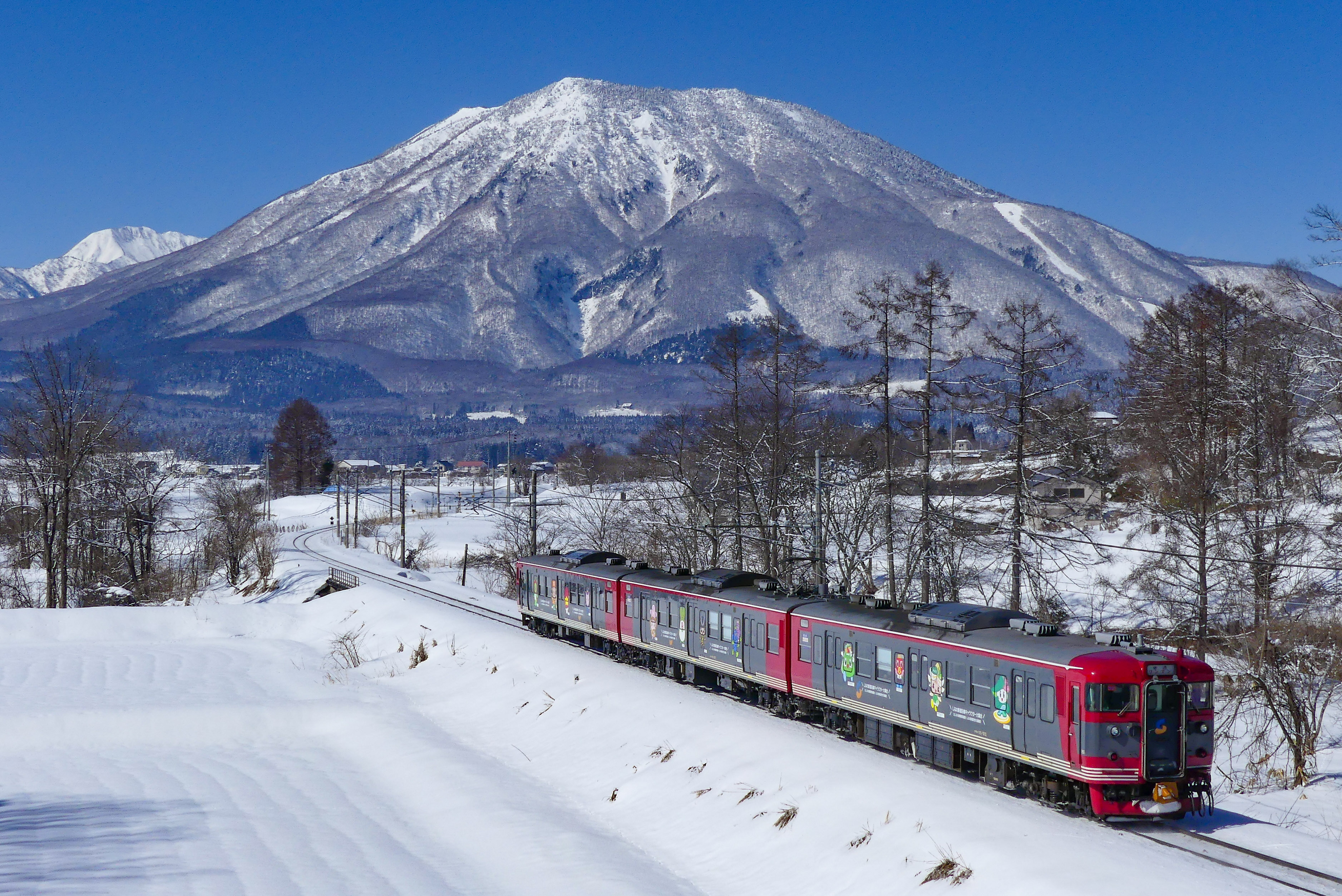
A Shinano Railway 115 series EMU

Services are operated using 115 series electric multiple unit (EMU) trains transferred from JR East.

== History ==
The name of the line was chosen in March 2013 following a public ballot.

== See also ==
- List of railway lines in Japan
