= Iizuna =

Iizuna 飯綱町
- Town
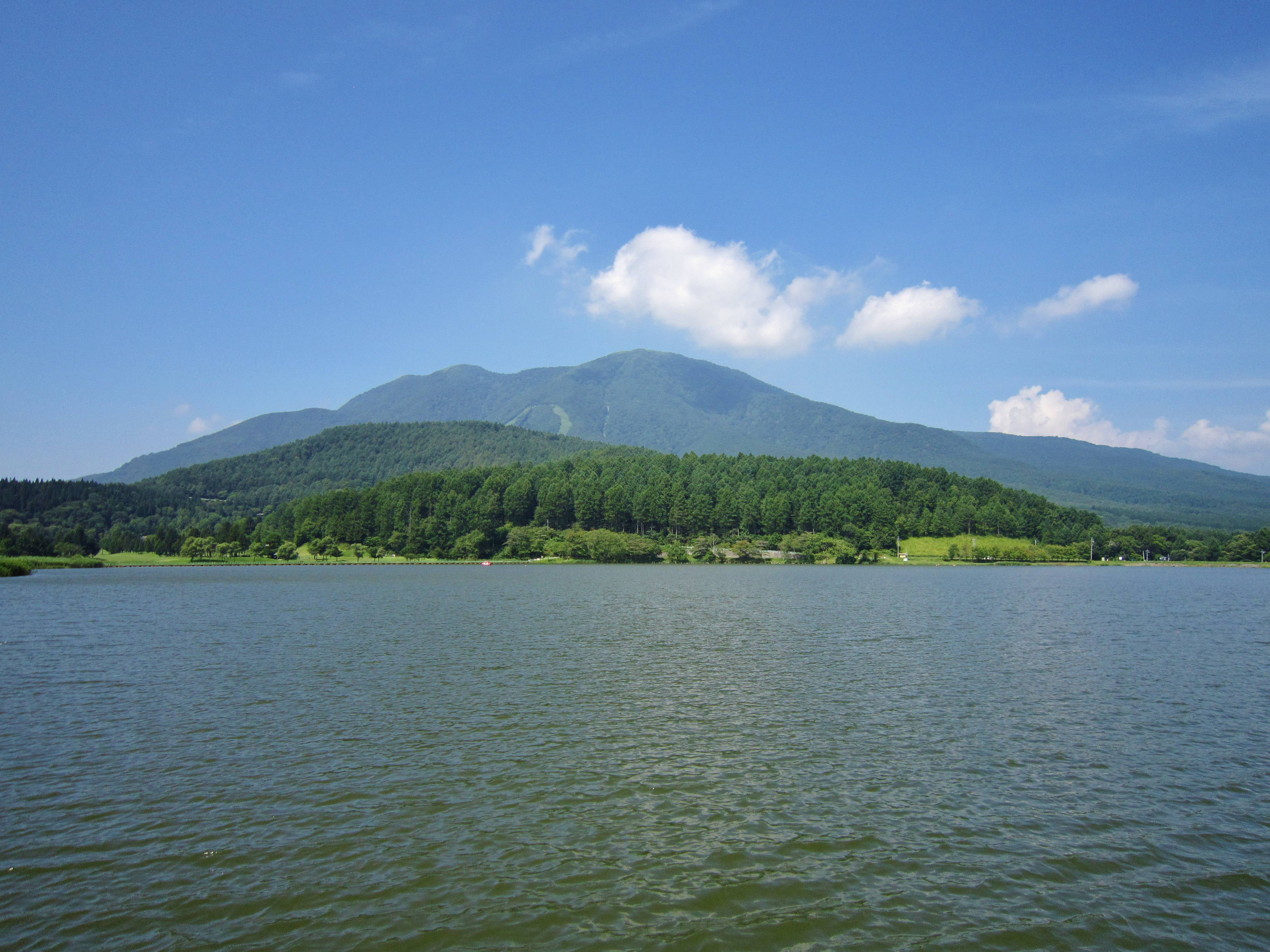
- Lake Reisenji and Mount Iizuna

- Flag Seal

- Location of Iizuna in Nagano Prefecture

- Coordinates: 36°45′17.2″N 138°14′7.9″E
- Country: Japan
- Region: Chūbu (Kōshin'etsu)
- Prefecture: Nagano
- District: Kamiminochi

Area
  - Total: 75.00 km^{2} (28.96 sq mi)

Population (March 2019)
  - Total: 11,115
  - Density: 148.2/km^{2} (383.8/sq mi)
- Time zone: UTC+9 (Japan Standard Time)
- Symbols
  - Tree: Sakura
  - Flower: Apple
- Phone number: 026-253-2511
- Address: 2795-1 Mure, Iizuna-machi, Kamiminochi-gun, Nagano-ken 389-1293
- Website: Official website

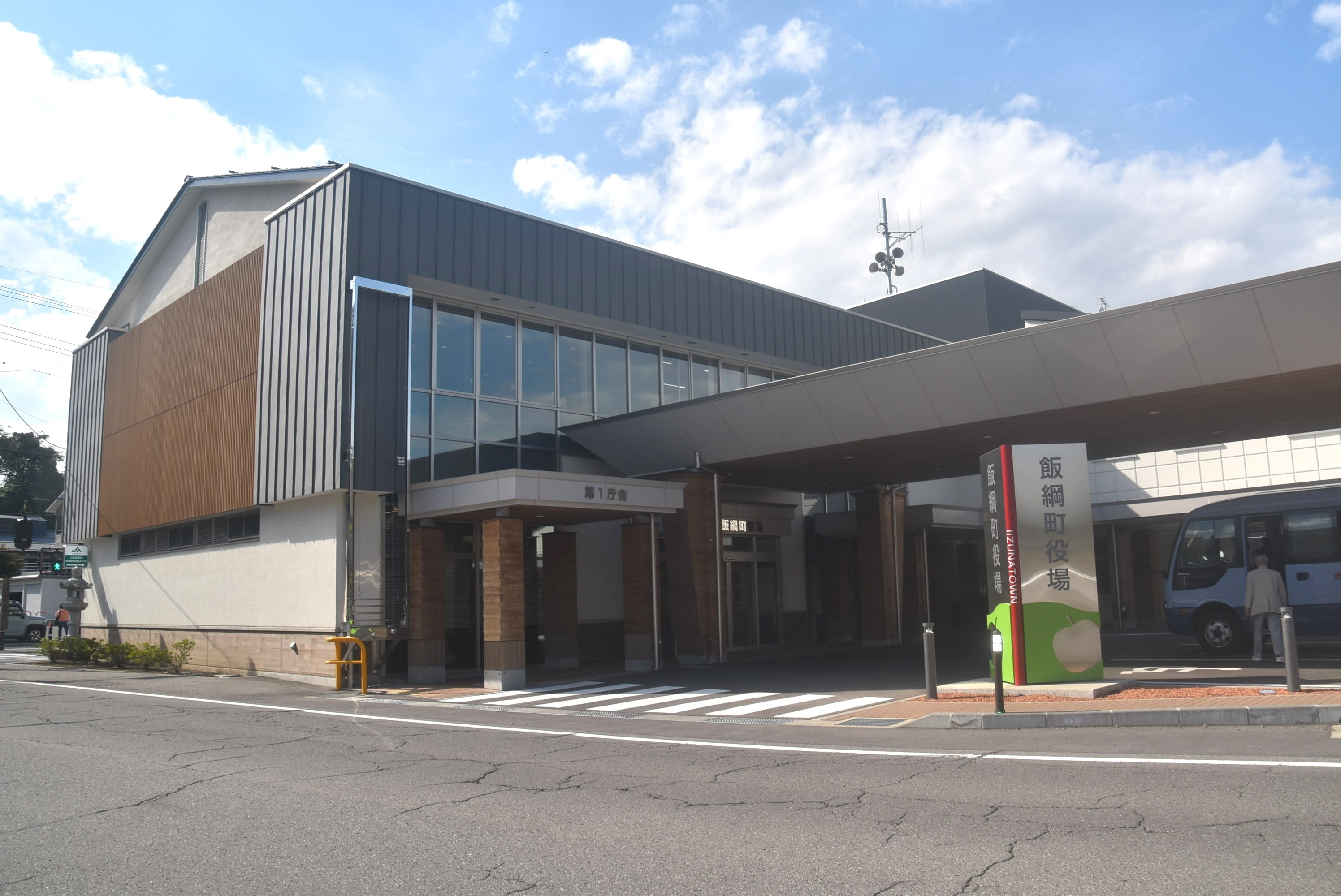
Iizuna Town Hall

Iizuna (飯綱町, Iizuna-machi) is a town located in the Kamiminochi District of northern Nagano Prefecture, Japan. As of 31 March 2019, the town had an estimated population of 11,115 in 4187 households, and a population density of 150 persons per km^{2}. the total area of the town is 75.00 square kilometres (28.96 sq mi).

== Geography ==
Iizuna is located in northern Nagano Prefecture. It is 13.9 km from east to west and 15.6 km from north to south. The Yaja River that flows from the Mount Reisenji forms the western border of the town which is located on its river terrace. The Torii River flows through the center of town. The Madarao River from Shinano flows on the north side of this town. It joins the Chikuma River via Nakano City in the east.

=== Climate ===
The village has a climate characterized by hot and humid summers, and cold winters (Köppen climate classification Cfa). The average annual temperature in Iizuna is 11.3 °C. The average annual rainfall is 1254 mm with September as the wettest month. The temperatures are highest on average in August, at around 24.9 °C, and lowest in January, at around -1.5 °C.

=== Surrounding municipalities ===
- Nagano Prefecture
  - Nagano
  - Nakano
  - Shinano

== Demographics ==
Per Japanese census data, the population of Iizuna was relatively stable throughout the late 20th century but has declined in recent decades.

Historical population
Year	Pop.	±%
1940	12,533	—
1950	15,503	+23.7%
1960	13,845	−10.7%
1970	12,473	−9.9%
1980	12,000	−3.8%
1990	12,830	+6.9%
2000	13,062	+1.8%
2010	11,865	−9.2%
2020	10,296	−13.2%

== History ==
The area of present-day Iizuna was part of ancient Shinano Province. During the Edo period, Mure developed as a post station on the Hokkoku Kaidō highway.

The modern town was created through a merger of the villages of Samizu and Mure on October 1, 2005. Its name comes from Mount Iizuna which dominates the town's western sky.

== Economy ==
The economy of Iizuna is agricultural, primarily rice cultivation and horticulture.

== Education ==
Iizuna has four public elementary schools and one public middle school operated by the town government, and one high school operated by the Nagano Prefectural Board of Education.

=== High school ===
- Nagano Prefectural Hokubu High School.

=== Junior high school ===
- Iizuna Junior High School

=== Elementary schools ===
- Mure Elementary School
- Samizu Elementary School

== Transportation ==
=== Railway ===
- Shinano Railway - Kita-Shinano Line
  - Mure

=== Highway ===
- Jōshin-etsu Expressway
- National Route 18

== Local attractions ==
- Iizuna is notable for being home to The Spiral, Asia's only permanent bobsleigh, luge and skeleton track. This track was a venue for the 1998 Winter Olympic Games.
