= Myōkō-Kōgen Station =

Railway station in Myōkō, Niigata Prefecture, Japan

Myōkō-Kōgen Station 妙高高原駅
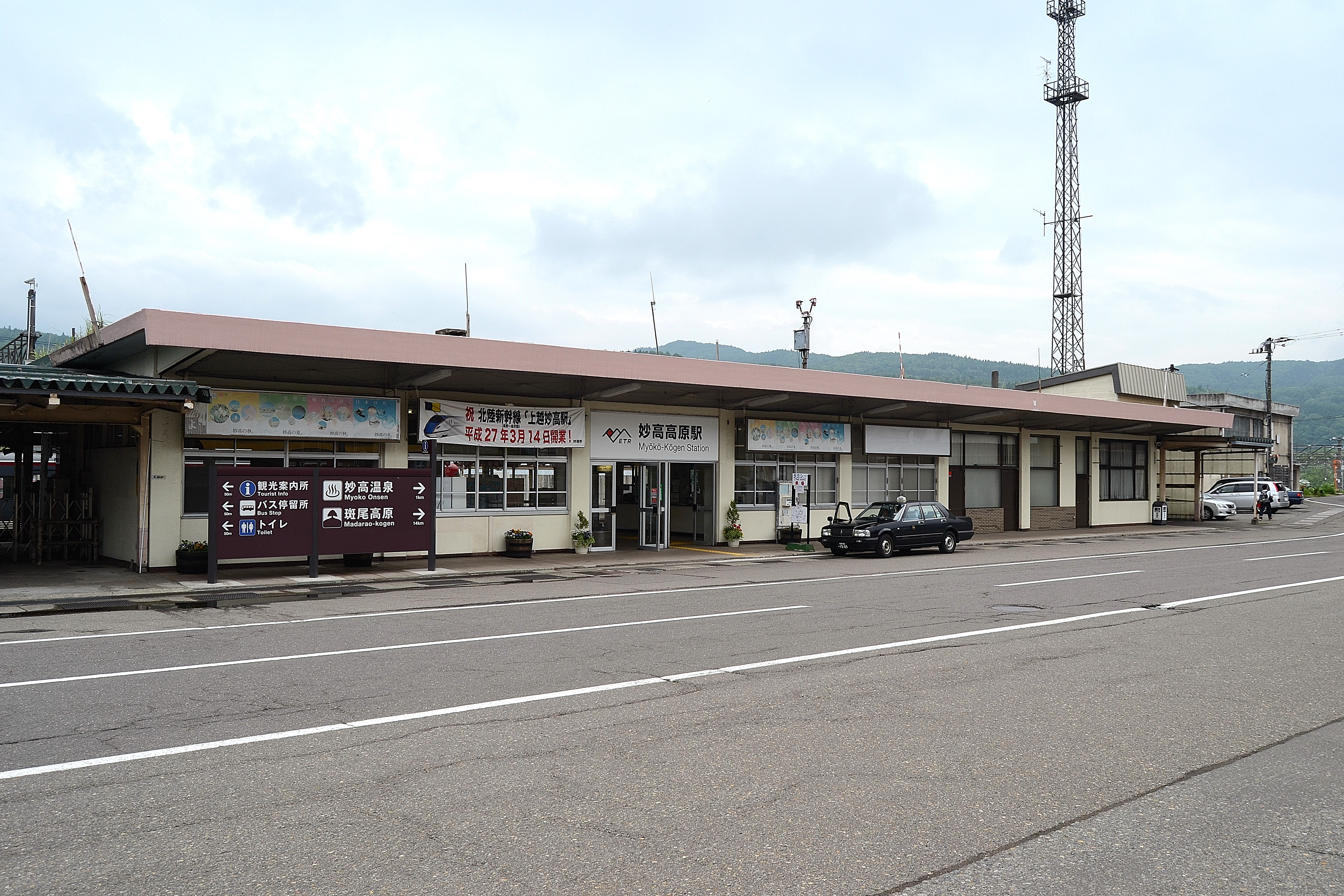
- Myōkō-Kōgen Station in June 2015

General information
- Location: 312 Taguchi, Myōkō-shi, Niigata-ken 949-2106; Japan
- Coordinates: 36.8720°N 138.2121°E
- Elevation: 510 metres (1,670 ft)
- Operator: Shinano Railway; Echigo TOKImeki
- Lines: ■ Shinano Railway Kita-Shinano Line; ■ Myōkō Haneuma Line
- Distance: 37.3 kilometres (23.2 mi) from Nagano
- Platforms: 1 side + 1 island platforms
- Tracks: 3

History
- Opened: 1 May 1888
- Former names: Taguchi (until 1969)

Passengers
- FY2017: 282 daily

Services
Preceding station	Shinano Railway	Following station
Kurohime towards Nagano	Kita-Shinano Line	Terminus
Preceding station	Echigo TOKImeki	Following station
Terminus	Myōkō Haneuma Line	Sekiyama towards Naoetsu
Location
- Location within Myoko Haneuma Line Location within Japan

Myōkō-Kōgen Station (妙高高原駅, Myōkō-Kōgen-eki) is a railway station in Myōkō, Niigata, Japan, jointly operated by the third-sector railway operators Shinano Railway and Echigo Tokimeki Railway.

== Lines ==
Myōkō-Kōgen forms the boundary station between the 37.3 km Shinano Railway Kita-Shinano Line from Nagano and the 37.7 km Echigo Tokimeki Railway Myōkō Haneuma Line to Naoetsu. No regularly scheduled through-running services operate, but a cross-platform transfer is provided, with Shinano Railway trains normally using platform 2 and Echigo Tokimeki Railway trains normally using platform 3.

== Station layout ==
The station has one side platform and one island platform connected by a footbridge.

=== Platforms ===
1	■ Myōkō Haneuma Line	for Jōetsumyōkō, Takada, and Naoetsu
2	■ Kita-Shinano Line	for Toyono and Nagano
3	■ Myōkō Haneuma Line	for Jōetsu-Myōkō, Takada, and Naoetsu

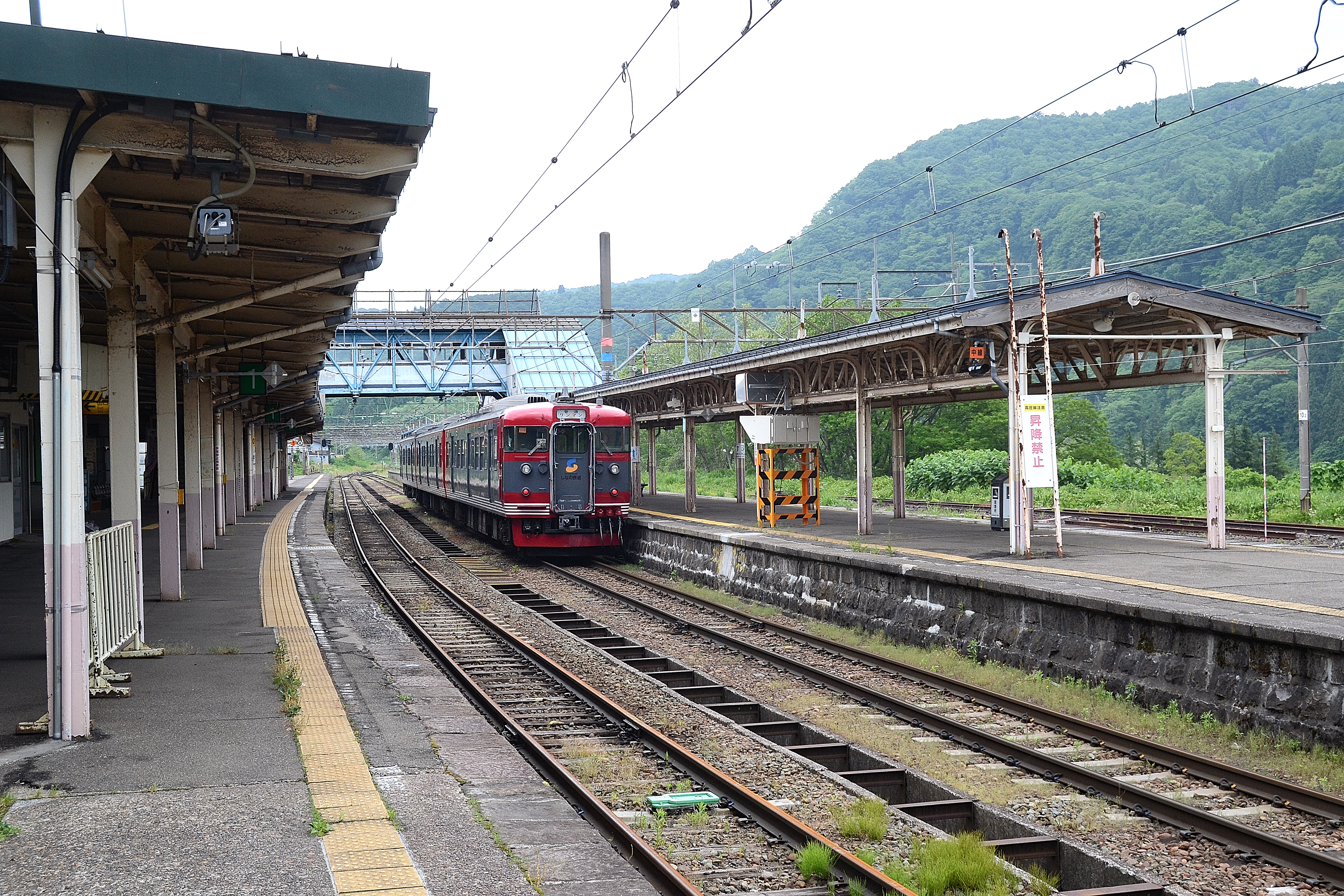
A Shinano Railway 115 series train at platform 2 in June 2015

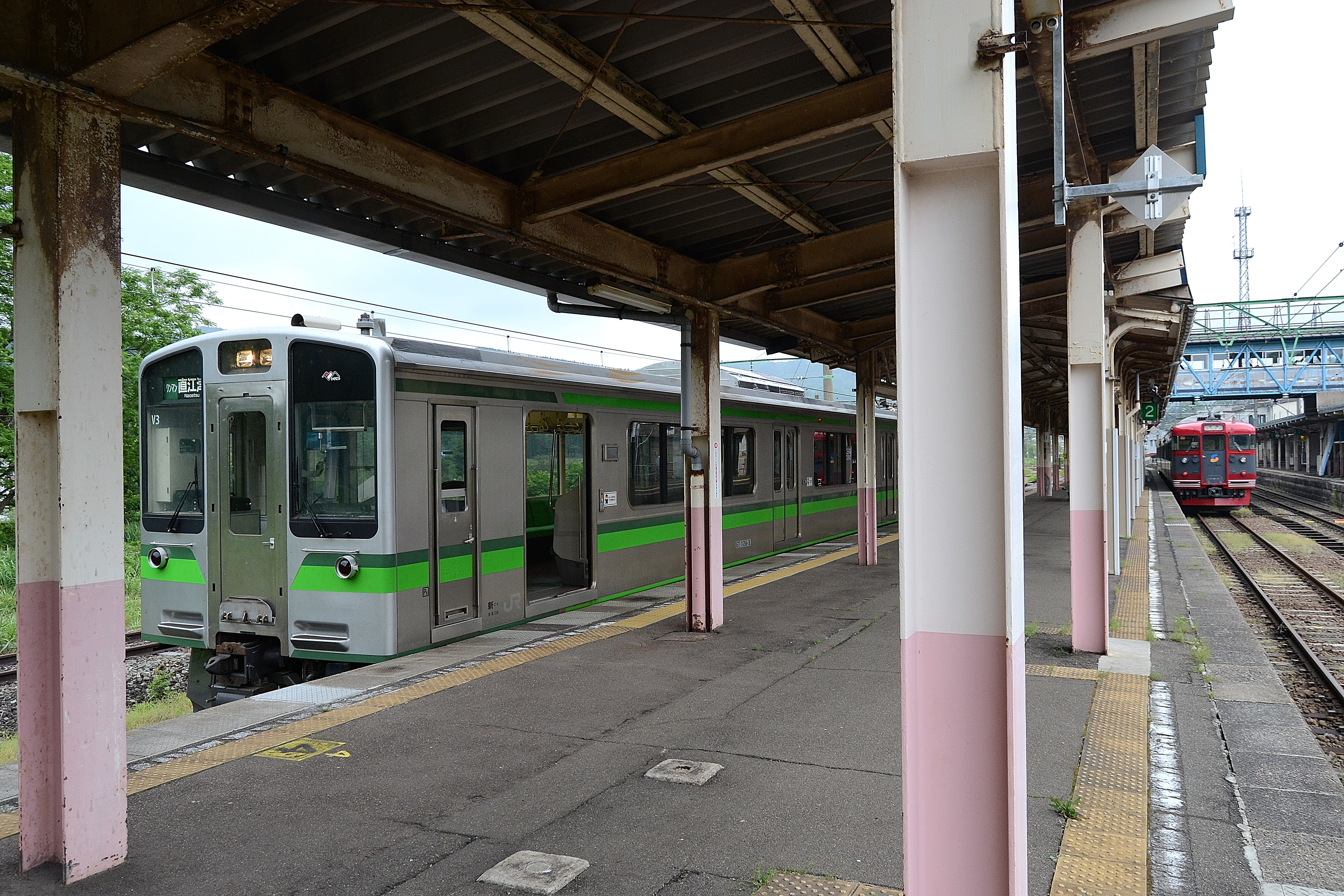
ETR and Shinano Railway trains at platforms 3 and 2 in June 2015

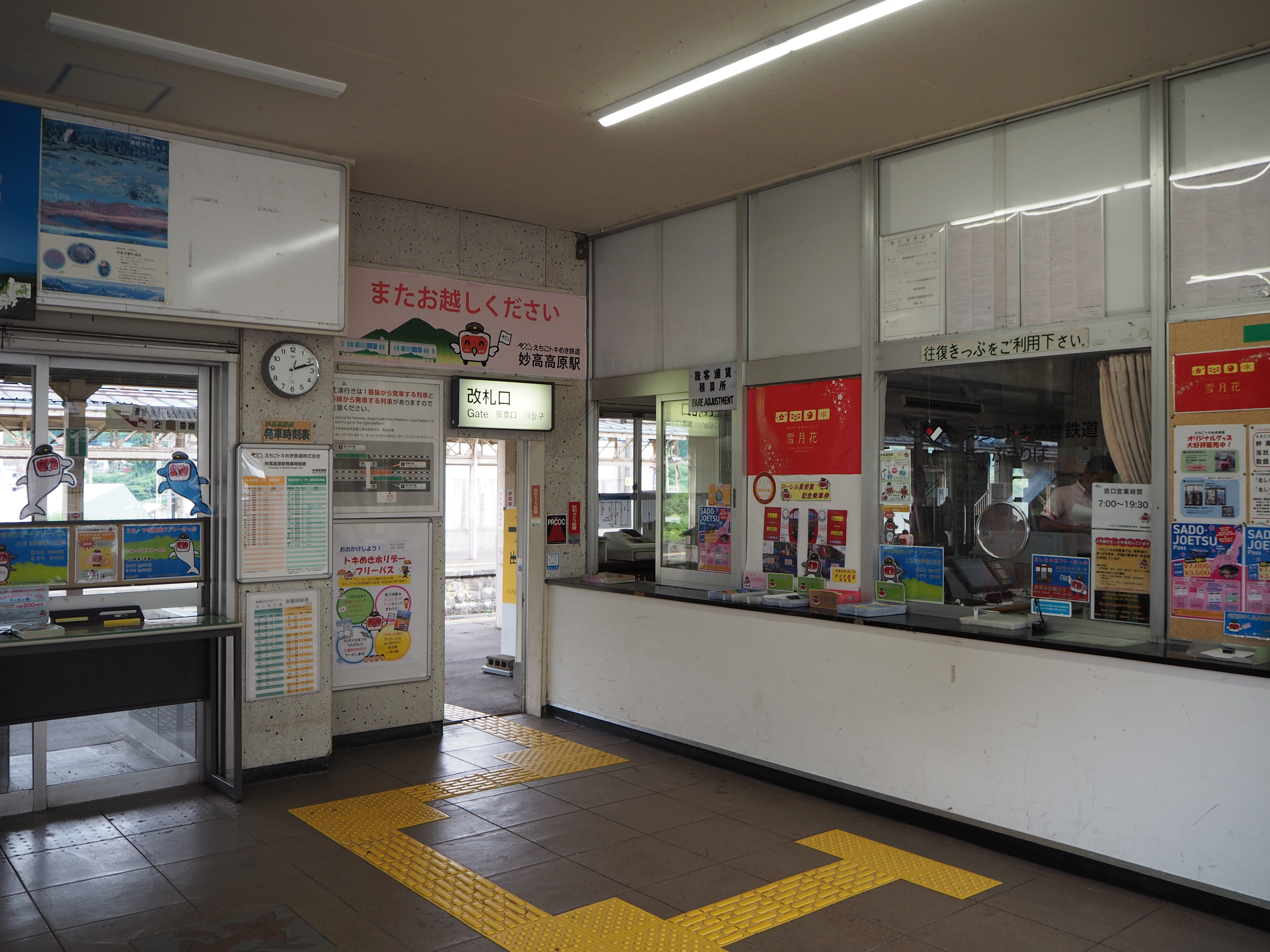
Station interior, August 2018

== History ==
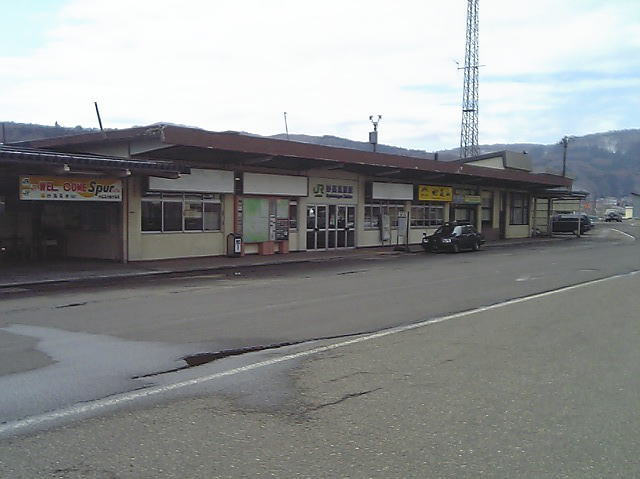
Myōkō-Kōgen Station in April 2006, when operated by JR East

The station opened on 1 May 1888, named Taguchi Station (田口駅). It was renamed Myōkō-Kōgen Station on 1 October 1969. With the privatization of JNR on 1 April 1987, the station came under the control of East Japan Railway Company (JR East).

From 14 March 2015, with the opening of the Hokuriku Shinkansen extension from Nagano to Kanazawa, local passenger operations over sections of the Shinetsu Main Line running roughly parallel to the new shinkansen line were reassigned to different third-sector railway operating companies. From this date, Myōkō-Kōgen Station became a boundary station between the Shinano Railway Kita-Shinano Line of Nagano Prefecture to the south and the Echigo Tokimeki Railway Myōkō Haneuma Line of Niigata Prefecture to the north.

== Passenger statistics ==
In fiscal 2015, the station was used by an average of 282 passengers daily (boarding passengers only).

== Surrounding area ==
- Former Myoko-Kogen town hall
- National Route 18

== See also ==
- List of railway stations in Japan
