= Shinano Railway =

Japanese railway company

- Native name: しなの鉄道
- Type: Third sector
- Genre: Rail transport
- Founded: May 1, 1996
- Headquarters: Ueda, Nagano, Japan
- Area served: Nagano Prefecture, Niigata Prefecture
- Key people: Takeharu Fujii (President)
- Services: Passenger railway
- Owner: Nagano Prefecture (73.64%); Nagano City (3.88%); Governments of Ueda, Komoro, Chikuma, Saku, Tōmi, Karuizawa, Miyota, Sakaki (totalling 12.98%); Hachijūni Bank (2.69%); Others (totalling 6.81%)
- Number of employees: 251 (As of 1 March 2015)
- Website: www.shinanorailway.co.jp

The Shinano Railway Co., Ltd. (しなの鉄道株式会社, Shinano Tetsudō Kabushiki-gaisha) is a Japanese third-sector railway operating company established in 1996 to operate passenger railway services on the section of the JR East Shin'etsu Main Line within Nagano Prefecture when it was separated from the JR East network in October 1997, coinciding with the opening of the Nagano Shinkansen (Hokuriku Shinkansen) from Takasaki to Nagano. The company was founded on May 1, 1996, and has its headquarters in Ueda, Nagano.

== Shareholders ==
Shares in the company are owned by Nagano Prefecture, the cities of Nagano, Ueda, Komoro, Chikuma, Saku, and Tōmi, the towns of Karuizawa, Miyota, Sakaki, Shinano, and Iizuna, and private-sector businesses.

== Lines ==
- Shinano Railway Line (65.1 km, Karuizawa - Shinonoi)
- Kita-Shinano Line (37.3 km, Nagano - Myōkō-Kōgen)

On October 1, 1997, the company took over control of local passenger operations on the 65.1 km section of the former JR East Shin'etsu Main Line between Karuizawa and Shinonoi. This section is called the Shinano Railway Line.

On March 14, 2015, the company took over control of local passenger operations on the 37.3 km section of the former JR East Shin'etsu Main Line between Nagano and Myōkō-Kōgen. This section is called the Kita-Shinano Line.

== History ==
The company was founded on May 1, 1996, and started railway business on the Shinano Railway Line on October 1, 1997.

== See also ==
- List of railway companies in Japan
