= Wakinoda Station =

Railway station in Jōetsu, Japan

Coordinates: 37°04′54″N 138°14′58″E

Wakinoda Station 脇野田駅
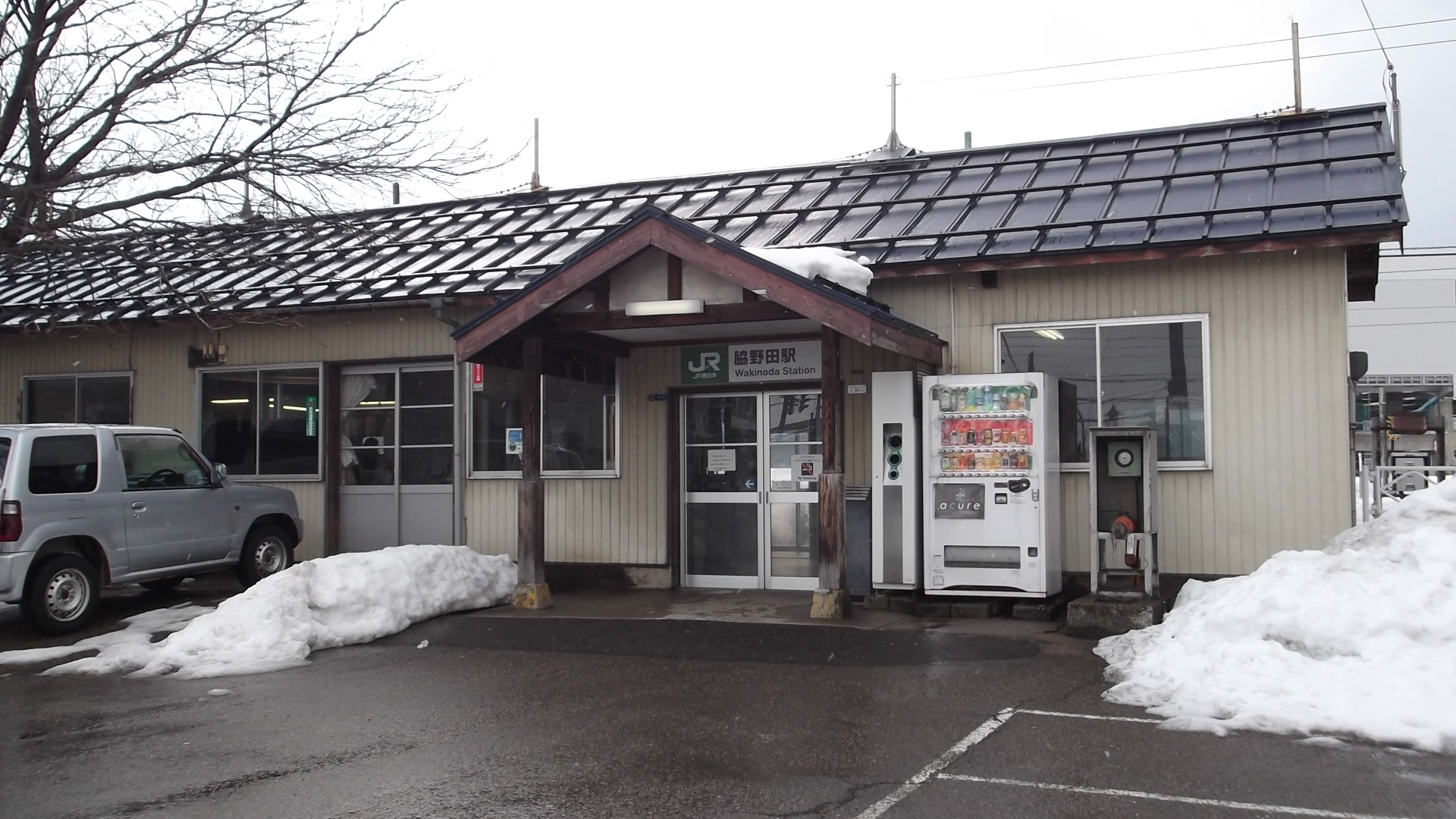
- The station building in March 2013

General information
- Location: 2 Yamato, Jōetsu, Niigata （新潟県上越市大和2丁目） Japan
- Operator: JR East
- Line: Shinetsu Main Line

History
- Opened: 1921
- Closed: 2014

Passengers
- FY2013: 139 daily
Location

Wakinoda Station (脇野田駅, Wakinoda-eki) was a railway station on the Shinetsu Main Line in Jōetsu, Niigata, Japan, operated by East Japan Railway Company (JR East). It closed in 2014, replaced by the nearby Jōetsumyōkō Station.

== Lines ==
Wakinoda Station was served by the Shinetsu Main Line. A new interchange station called Jōetsumyōkō Station was built close by, and this replaced Wakinoda Station when the Hokuriku Shinkansen opened in March 2015.

== Station layout ==
The station had a single ground-level island platform serving two tracks.

=== Platforms ===
1	■ Shinetsu Main Line	for Arai and Nagano
2	■ Shinetsu Main Line	for Naoetsu, Nagaoka, and Niigata

== Adjacent stations ==
«	Service	»
Shinetsu Main Line
Rapid Myōkō: Does not stop at this station
Minami-Takada	Rapid Kubikino	Kita-Arai
Minami-Takada	Local	Kita-Arai

== History ==
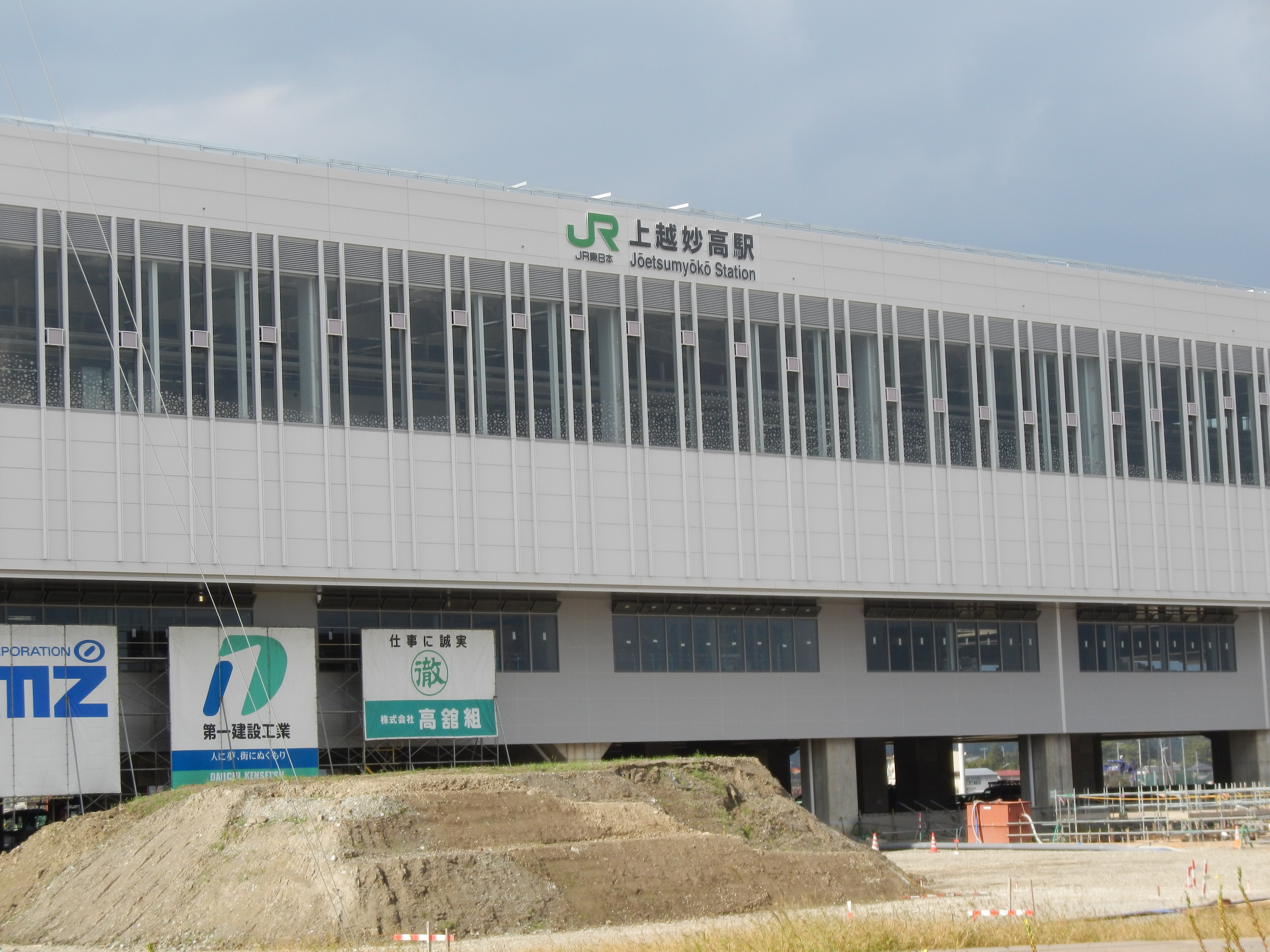
The new Jōetsumyōkō Station under construction, October 2013

Wakinoda Station opened on 15 August 1921. With the privatization of JNR on 1 April 1987, the station came under the control of JR East.

From 19 October 2014, the station building and platforms were closed, and the station functions moved to the nearby structure, and became Jōetsumyōkō Station from 14 March 2015 when the Hokuriku Shinkansen opened for service. Today, nothing remains of the former railway station - the station platforms and buildings were demolished for redevelopment, whilst the railway line was re-routed to stop at the new station. A portion of the old alignment of the line now has a road built along the former alignment.

== Passenger statistics ==
In fiscal 2013, the station was used by an average of 139 passengers daily (boarding passengers only). The passenger figures for previous years are as shown below.

Fiscal year	Daily average
2000	145
2005	135
2010	119
2011	122
2012	121
2013	139
