= Minori (train) =

Japanese limited express train service (1997–2002)

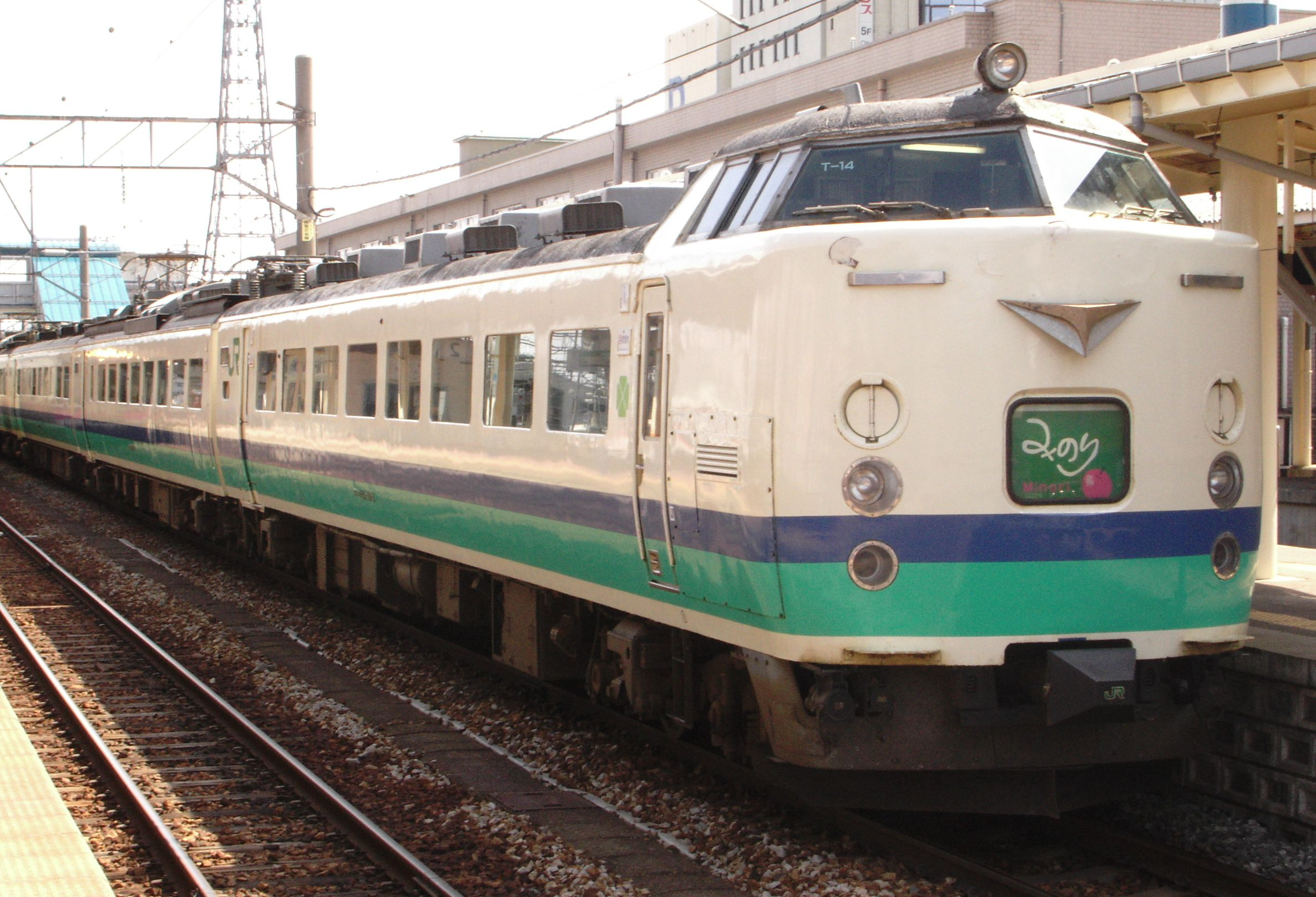
- 485 series EMU on a Minori service

Overview
- Service type: Limited express
- Status: Discontinued
- Locale: Shinetsu Main Line
- First service: 22 March 1997
- Last service: 30 November 2002
- Successor: Kubikino
- Former operator(s): JR East

Route
- Termini: Niigata; Takada

On-board services
- Class(es): Standard + Green

Technical
- Rolling stock: 485 series EMUs
- Track gauge: 1,067 mm (3 ft 6 in)
- Electrification: 1,500 V DC overhead

The Minori (みのり) was a limited express train service in Japan operated by the East Japan Railway Company (JR East) between Niigata and Takada on the Shinetsu Main Line in Niigata Prefecture between March 1997 and 2002.

== Rolling stock ==
Services were formed of Niigata-based 4- and 6-car 485 series EMUs.

== History ==
The Minori services commenced from the start of the revised timetable on 22 March 1997, with one working in each direction daily.

Services were increased to three workings in each direction daily from 1 October 1997, with two services in each direction operating between Niigata and Nagano, absorbing earlier Akakura express services and coinciding with the opening of the Nagano Shinkansen. Services to and from Nagano were subsequently cut back due to poor loadings, reduced to two workings in each direction daily between Niigata and Takada from 1 December 2001. The Minori services were discontinued from the start of the revised timetable on 1 December 2002, being replaced by new Kubikino rapid services operating between Niigata and Arai.

== See also ==
- List of named passenger trains of Japan
