= Kannondaira-Tenjindō Kofun Group =

Archaeological site in Myōkō, Hokuriku, Japan

Kannondaira-Tenjindō Kofun group
- 観音平・天神堂古墳群 (Japanese)
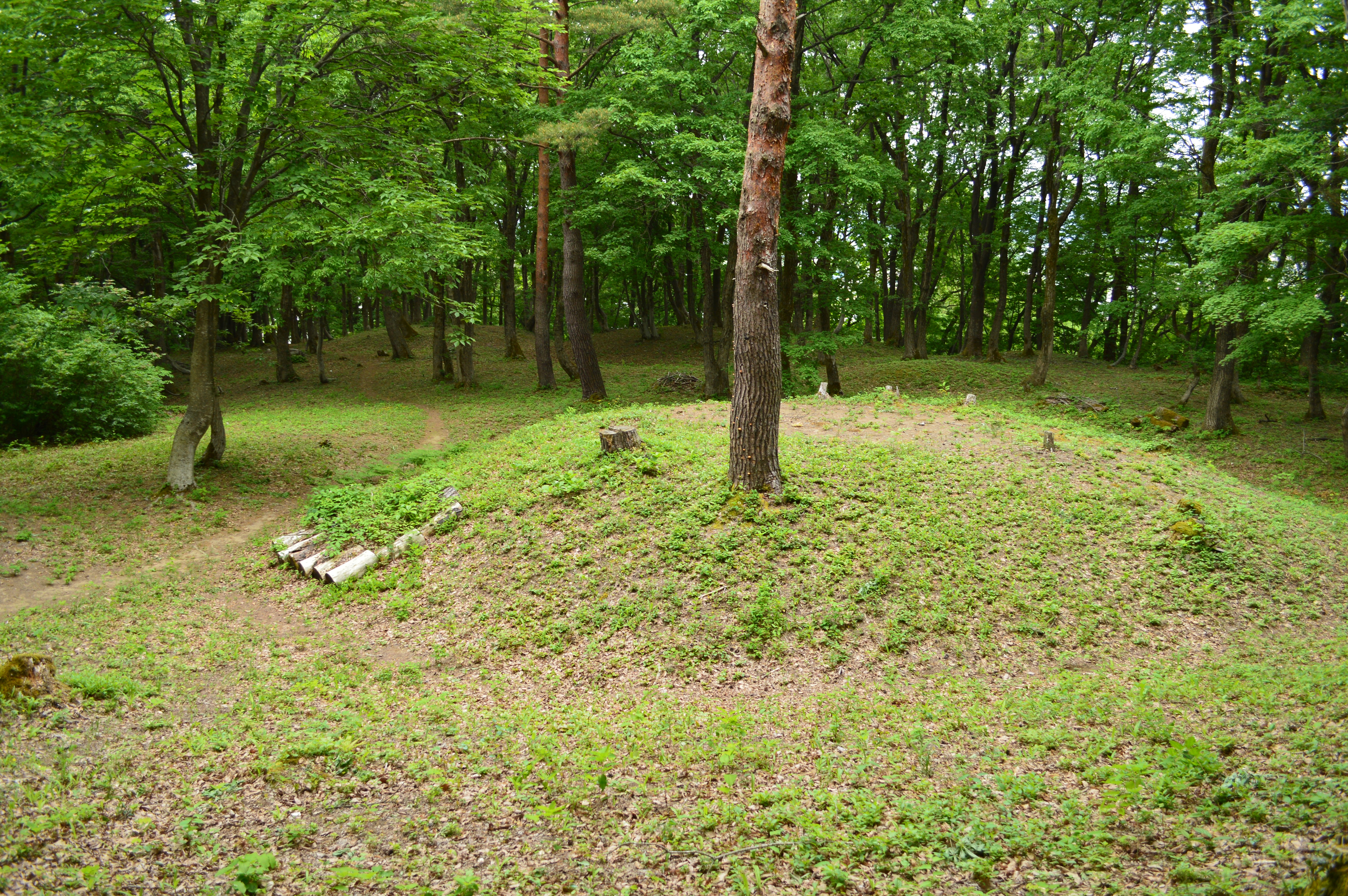
- Kofun in the Kannondaira Kofun group

- Kannondaira-Tenjindō Kofun group Kannondaira-Tenjindō Kofun Group (Japan)
- 37°03′36″N 138°13′55″E
- Type: Kofun
- Periods: Kofun period
- Location: Myōkō, Niigata, Japan
- Region: Hokuriku region

Site notes
- Area: 101,160 m^{2} (1,088,900 sq ft)
- Public access: Yes

The Kannondaira-Tenjindō Kofun cluster (観音平・天神堂古墳群, Kannondaira-Tenjindō Kofun-gun) is an archaeological site containing two separate groups of early to middle Kofun period burial tumulii located in what is now part of the city of Myōkō, Niigata in the Hokuriku region of Japan. The site was designated a National Historic Site of Japan in 1978.

== Overview ==
The Kannondaira-Tenjindō Kofun cluster consists of two separate groups of kofun, approximately one kilometer (0.6 mi) apart, located approximately 10 minutes by car from Arai Station on the JR East Shinetsu Main Line.

The Kannondaira Site contains three groups of approximately 53 tumuli, including one keyhole-shaped tomb (zenpō-kōen-fun (前方後円墳)) dating from the 3rd century. Most of the tombs are dome-shaped (empun (円墳)), although one is scallop-shaped (hotategai-gata kofun (帆立貝形古墳)) and some are square-shaped (hōfun (方墳)), indicating that the site is from a transitional period between the Yayoi period and the Kofun period. Haniwa and fukiishi have been recovered from the area. The keyhole-shaped tomb is designated No.4 in the group, and has a total length of 33.6 meters (110 ft), with a dome-portion measuring 19.0 by 23.0 meters (62.3 by 75.5 ft), and a trapezoidal portion with length of 11.6 meters (38 ft) and width of 7.0 meters (23.0 ft), narrowing to 5.0 meters (16.4 ft) at the "neck" where it connects with the dome. No grave goods were found in this tomb.

The Tenjindō Site also consists of three groups of tumuli, of which 188 have thus far been catalogued, making it one of the largest sites in Niigata Prefecture. Almost all of the tumuli are small and dome-shaped, with diameters between five and twenty-five meters (16 and 82 ft). The site has been repeatedly excavated by Tokyo University. Grave goods recovered include Sue ware, bronze mirrors, straight iron swords, parts of armor, horse fittings and items of jewellery. From these grave goods, it is estimated that these tumuli were constructed from the late 5th century to the late 6th century.

The two sites flank a large moated late Yayoi period to early Kofun-period settlement, the Hida Site, which has a separate National Historic Site designation. The Kannondaira cluster is to the north, and the Tenjindō cluster is to the south, and these areas may have been the necropolis for this settlement. As the area was mostly covered in forest, the state of preservation was relatively good, although even in 1976 it had been reported that a number of the known kofun has been destroyed due to urban encroachment, road construction, landslides and robbery. After the designation as a National Historic Site, the area has been cleared and opened to the public as an archaeological park, with a small museum to display some of the artifacts found.

== See also ==
- List of Historic Sites of Japan (Niigata)
