= Hida Sites =

Archaeological sites in Hokuriku, Japan

Hida ruins
- 斐太遺跡群 (Japanese)
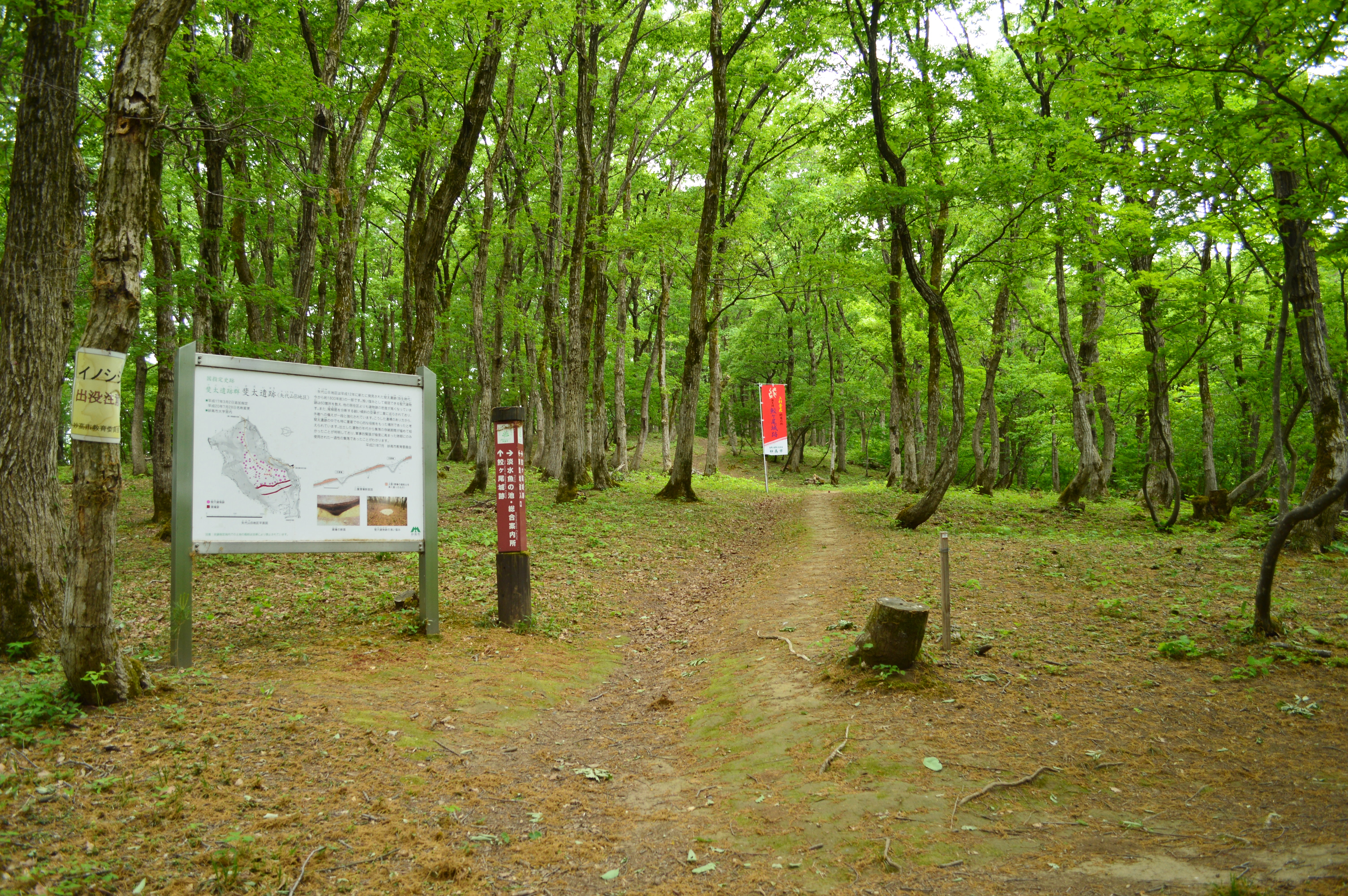
- Hida Site, Yashiroyama-B,

- Hida ruins Hida Sites (Japan)
- 37°03′20″N 138°14′03″E
- Type: settlement
- Periods: Yayoi period
- Location: Myōkō and Jōetsu, Niigata, Japan
- Region: Hokuriku region

Site notes
- Area: 101,160 m^{2} (1,088,900 sq ft)
- Public access: Yes (public park)

Hida ruins (斐太遺跡群, Hida isekigun) is a group of archaeological sites containing the ruins of late Yayoi to early Kofun period (approximately 3rd century AD) settlements located in what is now part of the cities of Myōkō and Jōetsu, Niigata in the Hokuriku region of Japan. The site includes the Hida ruins (斐太遺跡), Fukiage ruins (吹上遺跡) and the Kamabuta ruins (釜蓋遺跡). The Hida ruins were designated a National Historic Site of Japan in 1977 and the Fukiage ruins and Kamabuta ruins followed in 2005.

== Overview ==
The latter half of the Yayoi period was a period of war, which was described in Chinese history books as the Civil War of Wa. Many lowland Yayoi settlements were abandoned, and new settlements were constructed on hilltop locations, with defensive moats, earthen ramparts and wooden palisades. The ruins of many such settlements have been found throughout the Hokuriku region.

The Hida ruins in the city of Myōkō are located in a flat area on a hillside ridge with an elevation of approximately 40 meters, on the southwestern edge of the Kubiki Plain. Extending over 100,000 square meters, it is the largest known late Yayoi period moated settlement in northeastern Japan. The foundations of more than 200 pit dwellings were discovered, with the larger dwellings having a diameter of between eight and ten meters, and two meters for the smaller dwellings on the northern slopes of Mount Momoko. The settlement was surrounded by a U-shaped moat, 10 meters in width, and double-moated in vulnerable locations, with a total length of over one kilometer. Artifacts recovered indicated that the settlement was part of an extensive trade network. The ruins attracted scholarly attention as they appear to have been abandoned at the end of the Yayoi period or start of the Kofun period, but remained in relatively good preservation as the area had been kept as undisturbed forest for many centuries. The first extensive archaeological excavation was undertaken by the University of Tokyo from 1955 to 1958, with many subsequent excavations. The site is flanked to the north and south by the Kannondaira-Tenjindō Kofun Group. The archaeological site was designated a Niigata Prefectural Historic Site from 1952, and was promoted to a National Historic Site in 1977. It has been developed as a public recreational area.

In 2005, the Fukiage ruins in the city of Jōetsu was added to the National Historic site designation. These ruins date from middle Yayoi period into the Kofun period, and contain a double moated settlement with pit dwellings, and workshops for making jadeite balls, which were used as pestles for grinding. The number of jade magatama and cylindrical jade beads excavated at this site the largest thus found in Japan. In addition, copper products, such as dotaku, which are extremely rare for this region of Japan have also been discovered.

Kamabuta ruins was also a large moated settlement from the end of the Yayoi period to the beginning of the Kofun period. It utilized a river as part of its defenses. Many earthenware shards from distant areas, such as Omi to the west and the Kantō region to the east have been found. By its proximity to a river, it is thought that the Kamabuta settlement was a trading port on the river. The site is now a public garden with a small museum.

The Hida ruins are about a 10-minute drive from Arai Station on the JR East Shinetsu Main Line.

== See also ==
- List of Historic Sites of Japan (Niigata)
