= Takada Station (Niigata) =

Railway station in Jōetsu, Niigata Prefecture, Japan

Takada Station 高田駅
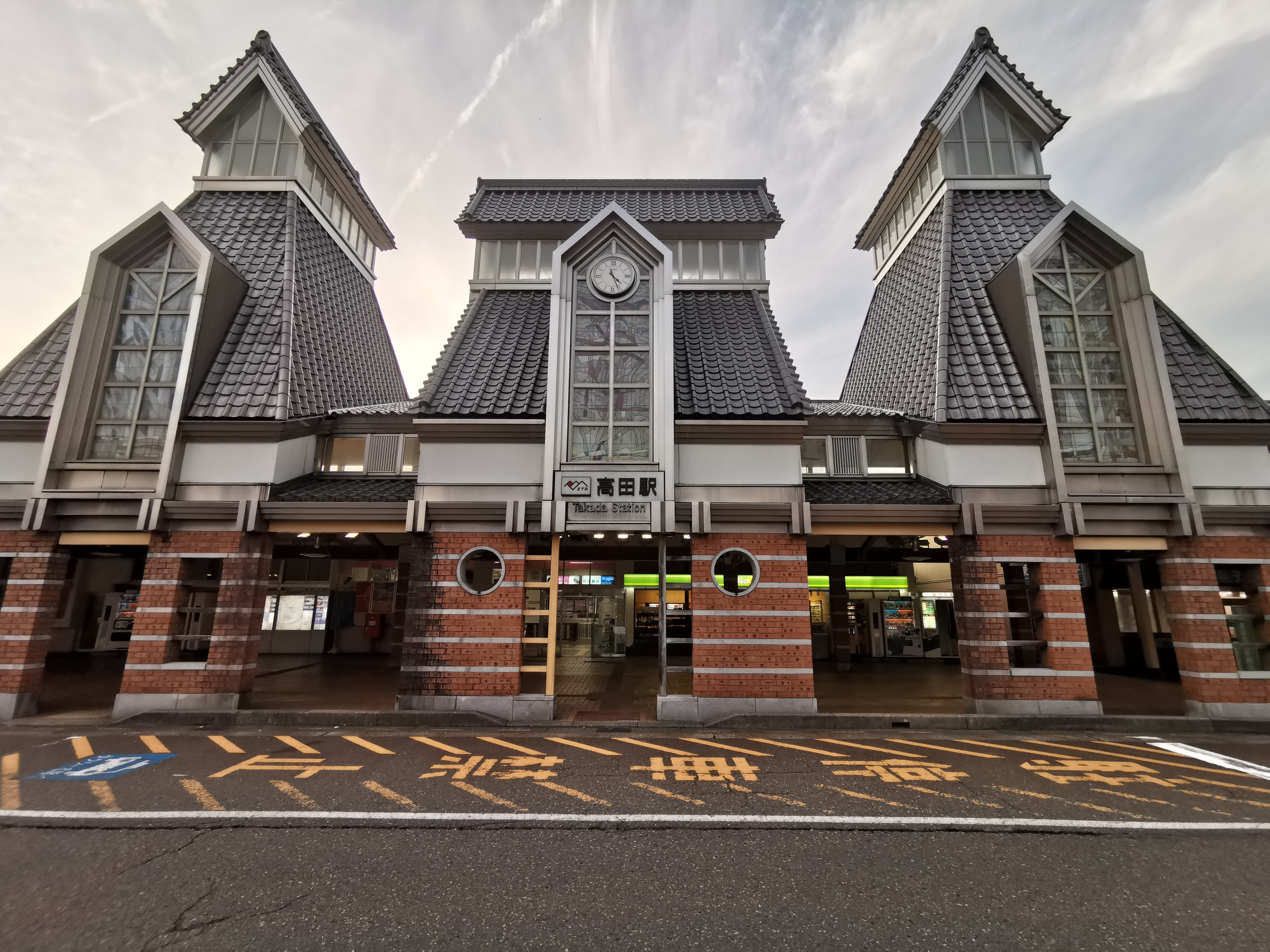
- Takada Station in October 2019

General information
- Location: 4 Nakamachi, Jōetsu-shi, Niigata-ken 943-0831; Japan
- Coordinates: 37°06′54″N 138°14′32″E
- Operator: Echigo Tokimeki Railway
- Line: ■ Myoko Haneuma Line
- Distance: 31.0 kilometres (19.3 mi) from Myōkō-Kōgen
- Platforms: 1 side + 1 island platforms
- Tracks: 3

Other information
- Status: Staffed
- Website: Official website

History
- Opened: 15 August 1886

Passengers
- FY2017: 2,342 daily
Location
- Location within Myoko Haneuma Line Location within Japan

Takada Station (高田駅, Takada-eki) is a railway station in the city of Jōetsu, Niigata, Japan, operated by the third-sector operator Echigo Tokimeki Railway.

== Lines ==
Takada Station is served by the 37.7 km Echigo Tokimeki Railway Myōkō Haneuma Line from Myōkō-Kōgen to Naoetsu, and is located 31.0 kilometers from the starting point of the line at Myōkō-Kōgen and 68.3 kilometers from Nagano.

== Station layout ==
The station has one side platform and one island platform connected by a footbridge.

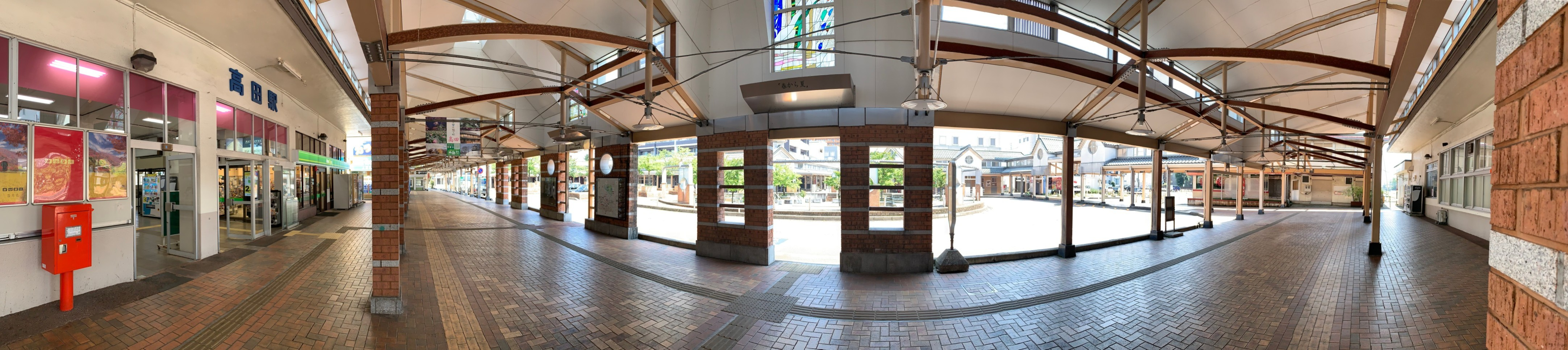
Entrance of the station, August 2020

=== Platforms ===
1	■ Myōkō Haneuma Line	for Myōkō-Kōgen, Arai and Niigata
2	■ Myōkō Haneuma Line	for Naoetsu
3	■ Myōkō Haneuma Line	(not used)

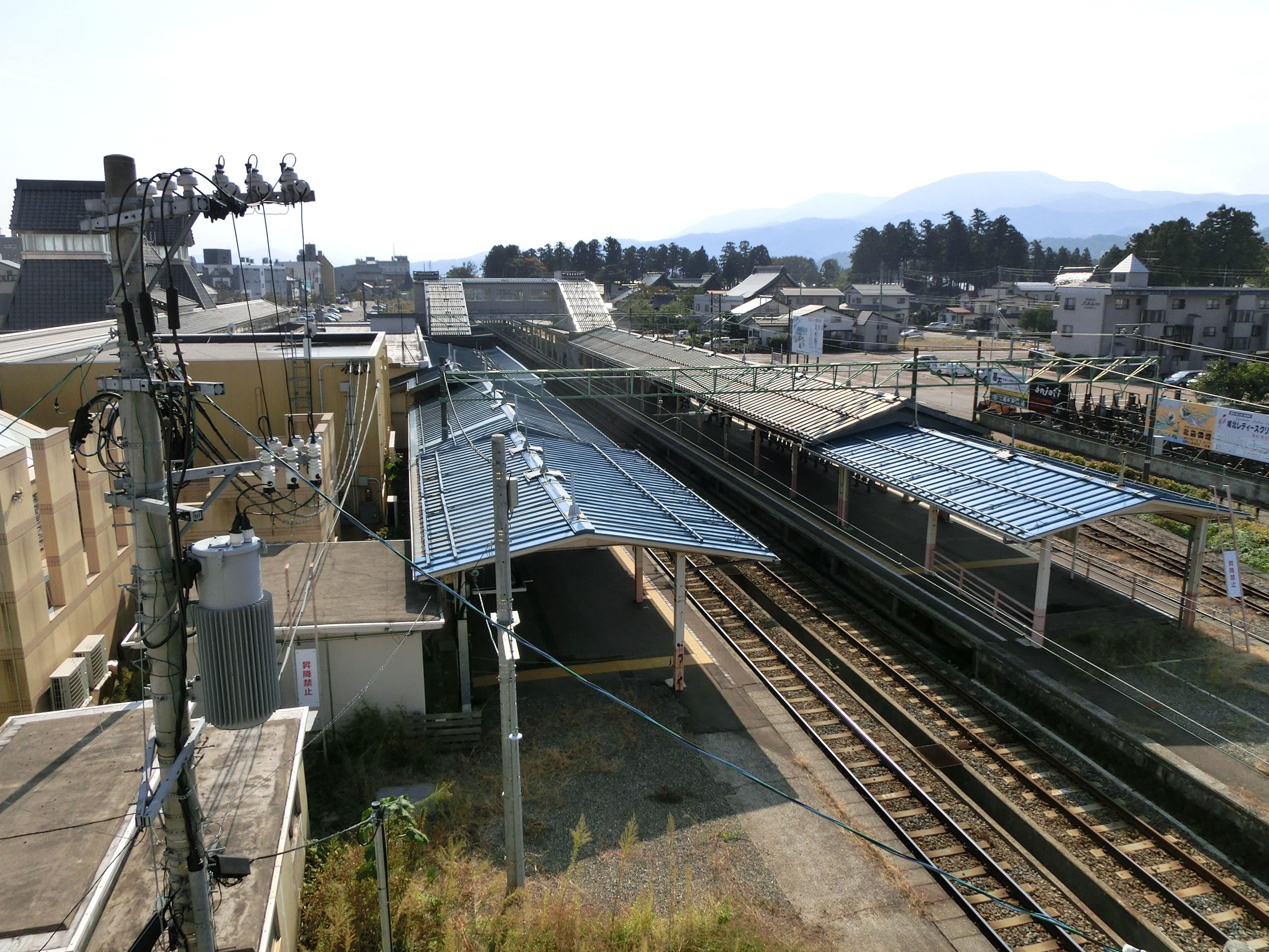
An overview of the station platforms in October 2012

== Adjacent stations ==
«	Service	»
Myōkō Haneuma Line
Jōetsumyōkō	Shirayuki	Naoetsu
Minami-Takada	Local	Kasugayama

== History ==
Takada Station opened on 15 August 1886. With the privatization of Japanese National Railways (JNR) on 1 April 1987, the station came under the control of JR East. From 14 March 2015, with the opening of the Hokuriku Shinkansen extension from Nagano to Kanazawa, local passenger operations over sections of the Shinetsu Main Line and Hokuriku Main Line running roughly parallel to the new shinkansen line were reassigned to third-sector railway operating companies. From this date, Takada Station was transferred to the ownership of the third-sector operating company Echigo Tokimeki Railway.

== Passenger statistics ==
In fiscal 2017, the station was used by an average of 2,342 passengers daily (boarding passengers only).

== Surrounding area ==
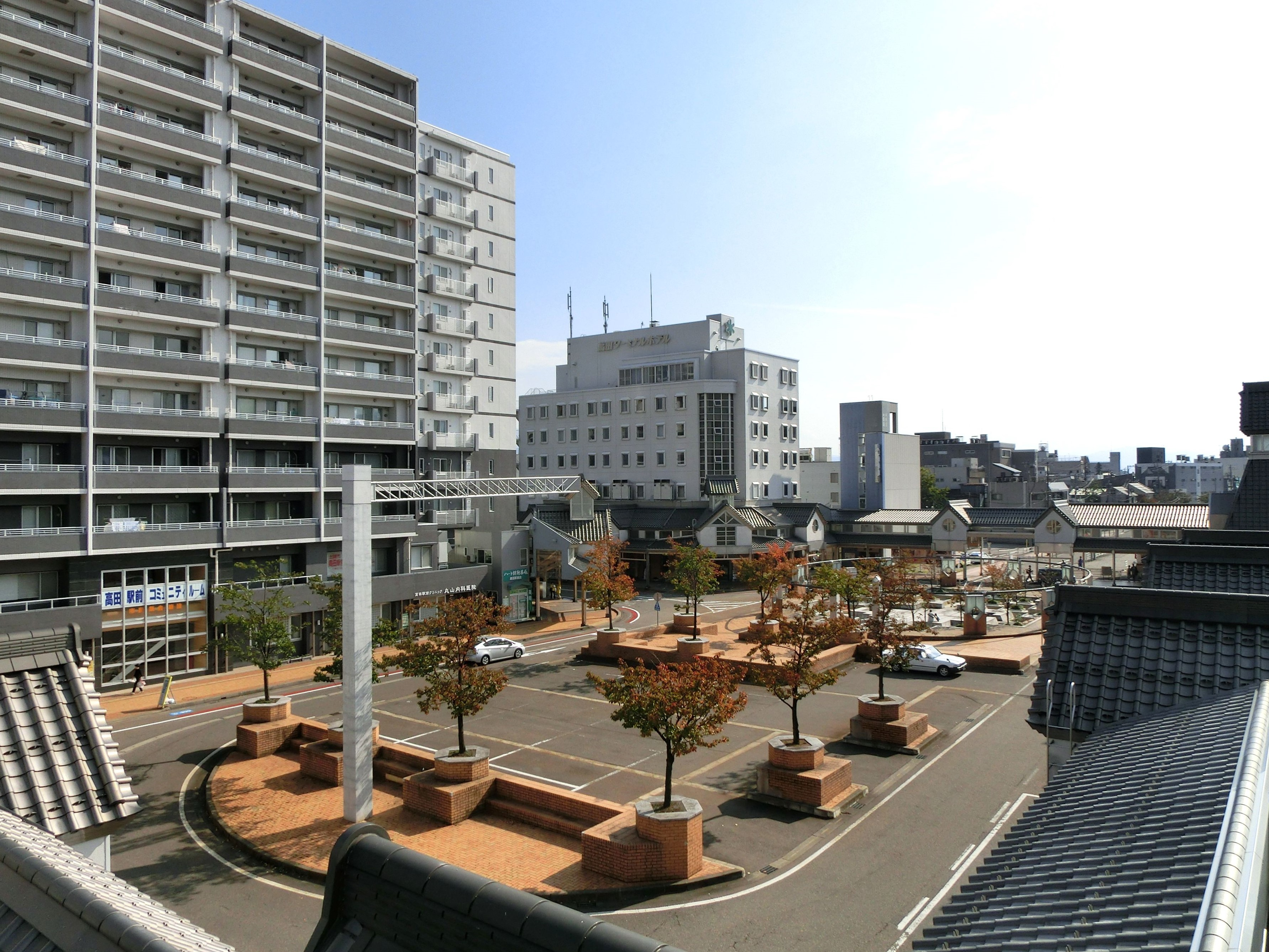
The station forecourt in October 2012

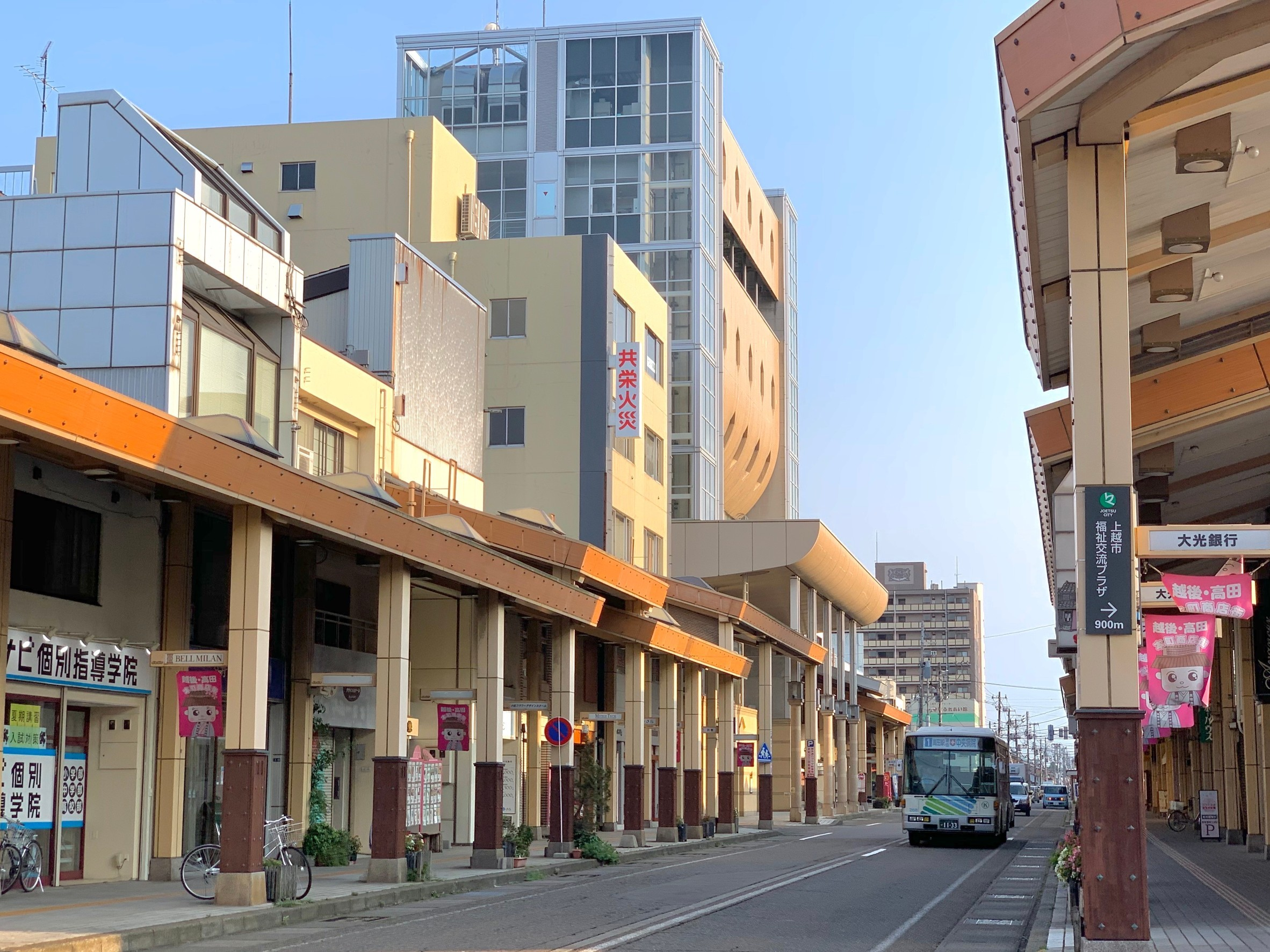
Central Takada in August 2020

- Takada Castle

== See also ==
- List of railway stations in Japan
