= Kubikino =

Japanese train service

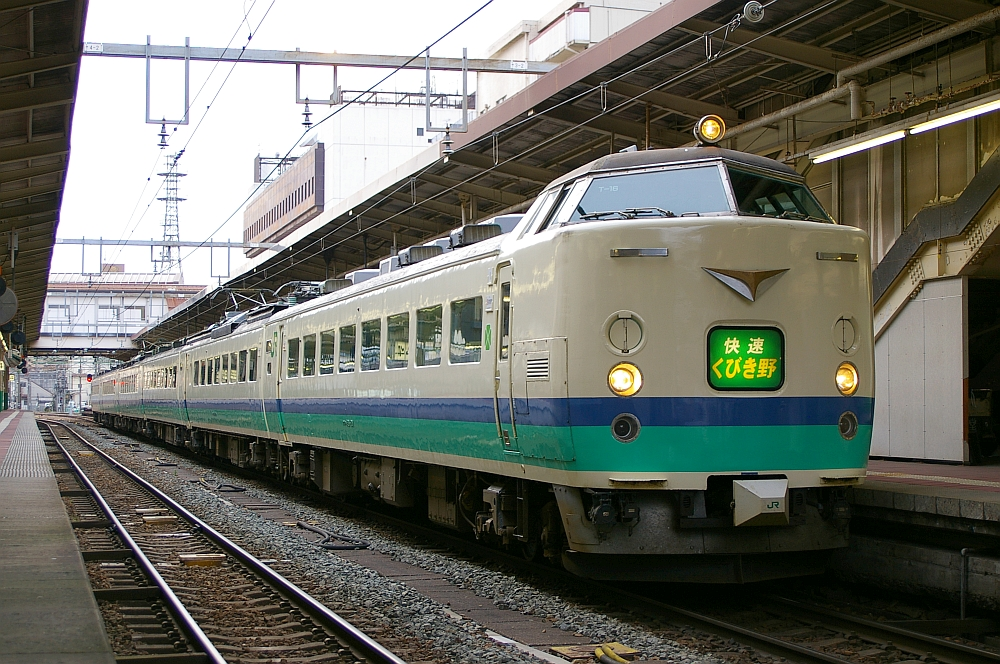
- 485 series EMU on a Kubikino rapid service, March 2007

Overview
- Service type: Rapid
- Status: Discontinued
- Locale: Shinetsu Main Line
- Predecessor: Minori
- First service: 1 December 2002
- Last service: 13 March 2015
- Successor: Shirayuki
- Former operator(s): JR East

Route
- Termini: Niigata; Arai
- Service frequency: 3 return services daily

On-board services
- Class(es): Green + Standard

Technical
- Rolling stock: 485 series EMUs
- Track gauge: 1,067 mm (3 ft 6 in)
- Electrification: 1,500 V DC overhead
- Operating speed: 120 km/h (75 mph)

The Kubikino (くびき野) was a "Rapid" limited-stop train service in Japan operated by the East Japan Railway Company (JR East) between Niigata and Arai on the Shinetsu Main Line in Niigata Prefecture from 2002 until March 2015.

== Service pattern ==
Services consisted of three trains in each direction daily.

== Rolling stock ==
Services were formed of 6-car 485 series EMUs, which included Green car (first class) accommodation. Niigata-based sets T16 and T17 were normally allocated to Kubikino duties, as these two sets did not receive the Green car seat refurbishment applied to other 485 sets used on Inaho limited express services in 2007.

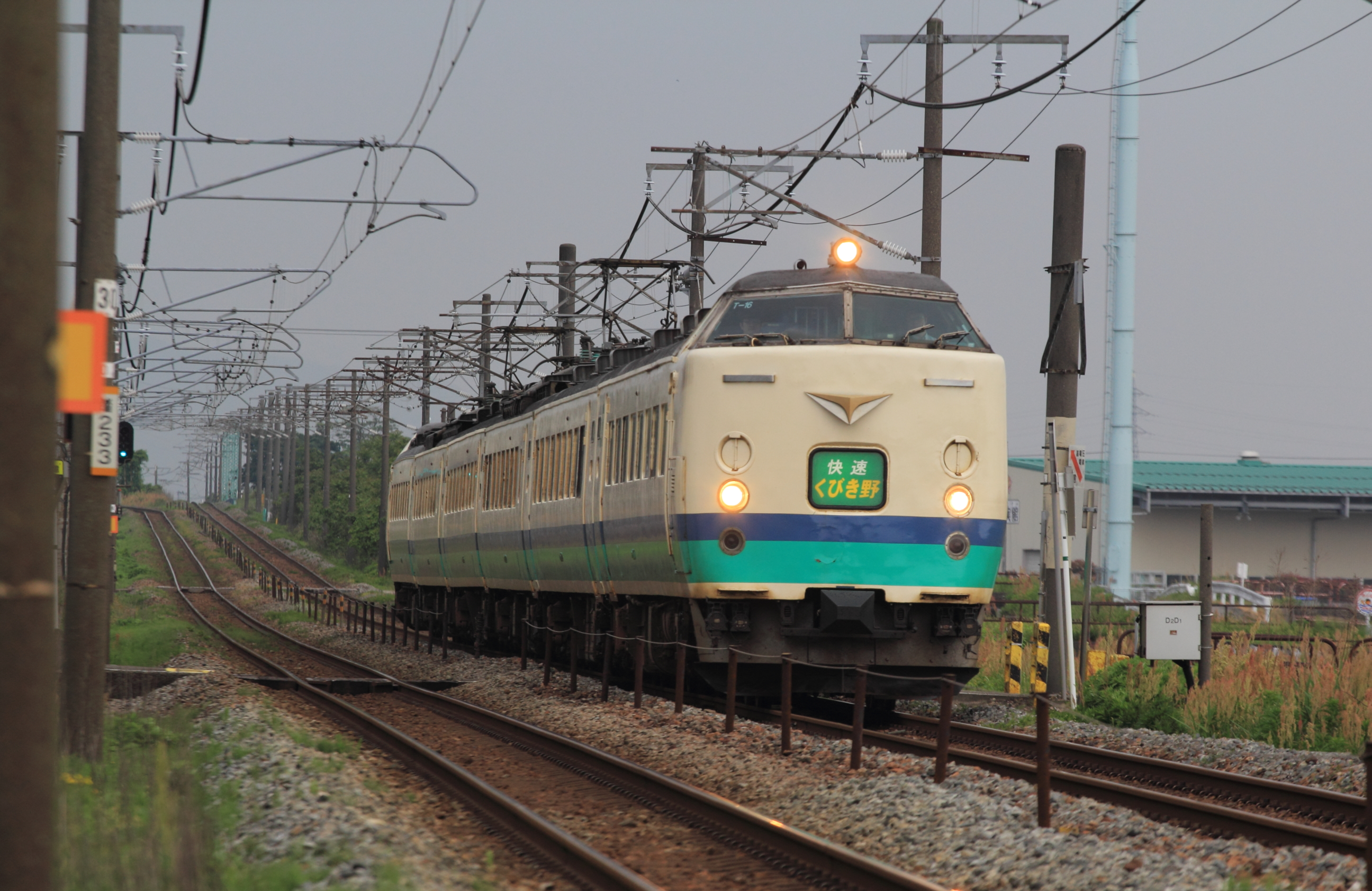
Niigata-based set T-16 on a Kubikino service, May 2012

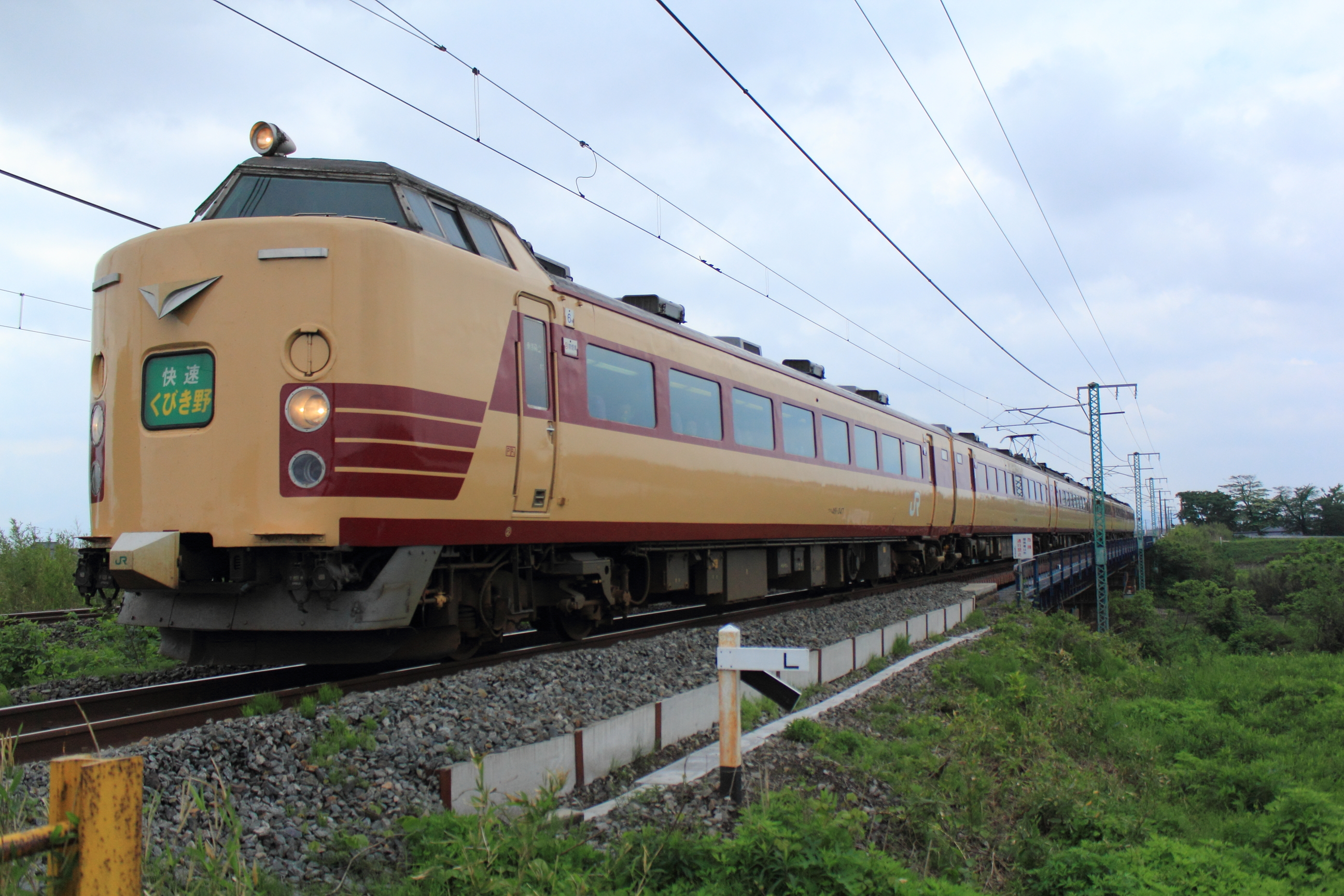
Niigata-based JNR-liveried set K-2 on a Kubikino service, May 2012

== Formation ==
Trains were formed as shown below, with car 1 at the Arai end.

| Car No. | 1 | | 2 | 3 | 4 | 5 | 6 |
|---|---|---|---|---|---|---|---|
| Numbering | KuRoHa 481 | | MoHa 484 | MoHa 485 | MoHa 484 | MoHa 485 | KuHa 481 |
| Accommodation | Green | Reserved | Non-reserved | Non-reserved | Non-reserved | Non-reserved | Non-reserved |

== History ==
The Kubikino services commenced from the start of the revised timetable on 1 December 2002, replacing the previous Minori limited express services. 4-car 485 series were initially used on these services, but 6-car Inaho 485 series sets were used from 20 May 2006 to relieve overcrowding.

A predecessor to the Kubikino rapid service, the Kubiki (くびき), operated as a semi-express between Niigata and Arai from 1 October 1963, and as an express service from 5 March 1966, before being absorbed into Yoneyama (よねやま) semi-express services operating between Nagano and Niigata from 30 September 1968.

Kubikino services were discontinued from the start of the revised timetable on 14 March 2015, coinciding with the opening of the Hokuriku Shinkansen extension from Nagano to Kanazawa. Services were replaced by new Shirayuki limited express services operating between Niigata and Arai.

== See also ==
- List of named passenger trains of Japan
