= Kita-Arai Station =

Railway station in Myōkō, Niigata Prefecture, Japan

Kita-Arai Station 北新井駅
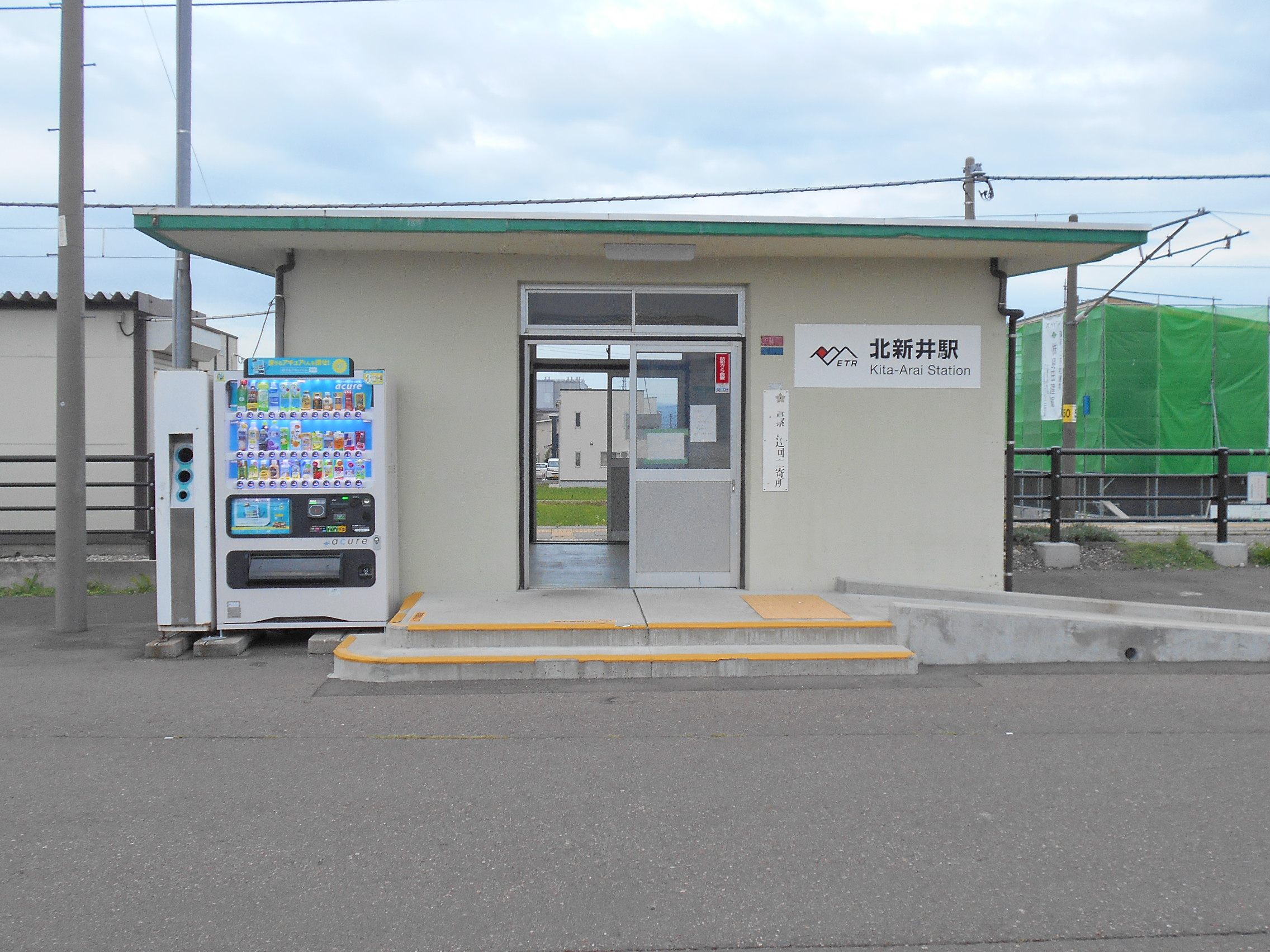
- Kita-Arai Station in July 2017

General information
- Location: Yanaida-chō, Myōkō-shi, Niigata-ken 944-0008; Japan
- Coordinates: 37.0529°N 138.2575°E
- Elevation: 33.6 m (110 ft)
- Operator: Echigo Tokimeki Railway
- Line: ■ Myōkō Haneuma Line
- Distance: 23.9 km from Myōkō-Kōgen
- Platforms: 1 side platform
- Tracks: 1

Other information
- Status: Unstaffed
- Website: Official website

History
- Opened: 15 July 1955

Passengers
- FY2017: 256 daily
Location
- Location within Myoko Haneuma Line Location within Japan

Kita-Arai Station (北新井駅, Kita-Arai-eki) is a railway station on the Myōkō Haneuma Line in the city of Myōkō, Niigata, Japan, operated by the third-sector operator Echigo Tokimeki Railway.

== Lines ==
Kita-Arai Station is served by the Myōkō Haneuma Line, and is located 23.9 kilometers from the starting point of the line at Myōkō-Kōgen and 61.2 kilometers from Nagano.

== Station layout ==
The station has a single ground-level side platform serving a bi-directional track. The station is unattended.

== Adjacent stations ==
| « | Service | » |
Myōkō Haneuma Line
Shirayuki: Does not stop at this station
| Arai | Local | Jōetsumyōkō |

== History ==
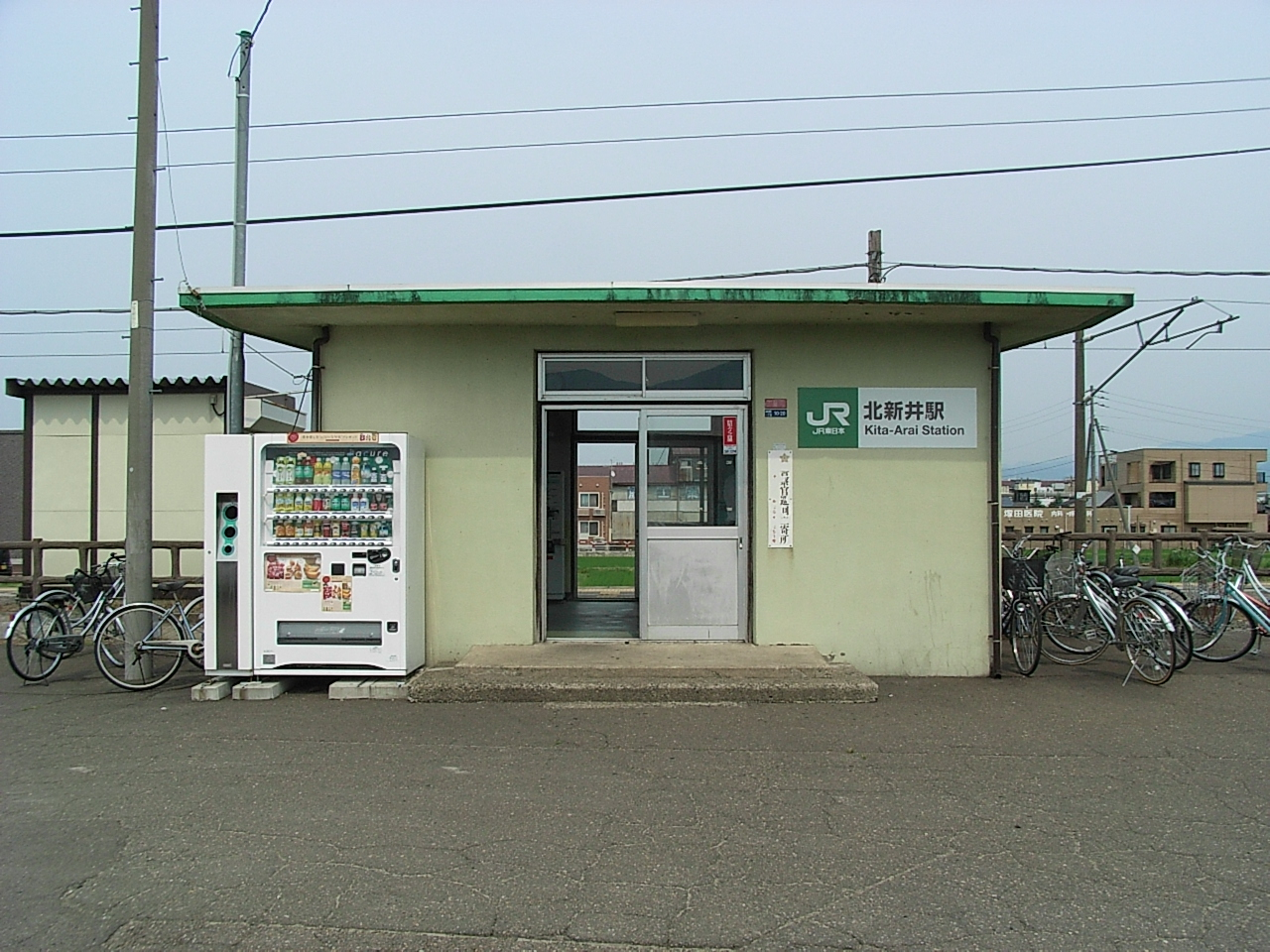
Kita-Arai Station in 2009, while under JR East control

Kita-Arai Station was opened on 15 July 1955. With the privatization of Japanese National Railways (JNR) on 1 April 1987, the station came under the control of JR East.

From 14 March 2015, with the opening of the Hokuriku Shinkansen extension from Nagano to Kanazawa, local passenger operations over sections of the Shinetsu Main Line and Hokuriku Main Line running roughly parallel to the new shinkansen line were reassigned to third-sector railway operating companies. From this date, Kita-Arai Station was transferred to the ownership of the third-sector operating company Echigo Tokimeki Railway.

== Passenger statistics ==
In fiscal 2017, the station was used by an average of 256 passengers daily (boarding passengers only).

== Surrounding area ==
- National Route 292

== See also ==
- List of railway stations in Japan
