= Jōetsumyōkō Station =

Railway station in Jōetsu, Niigata Prefecture, Japan

Jōetsumyōkō Station 上越妙高駅
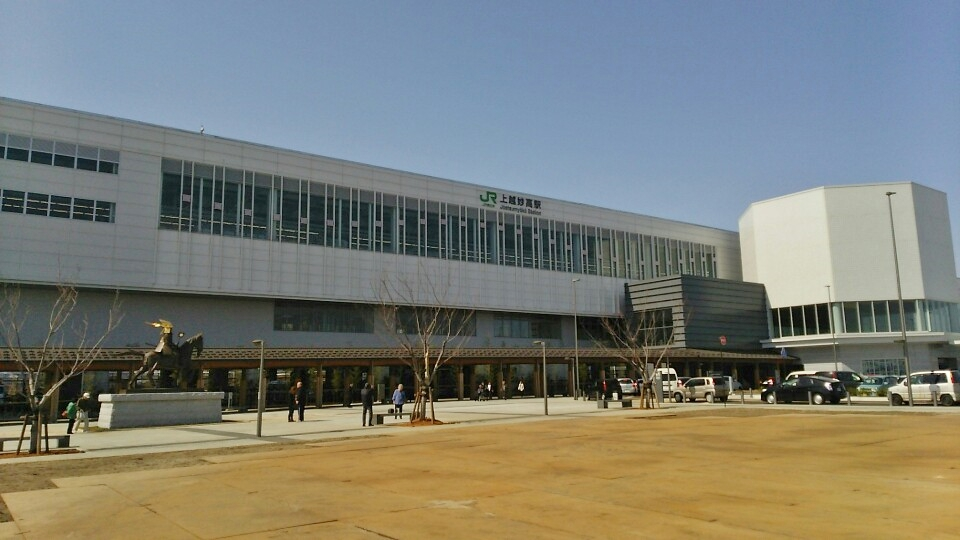
- The station exterior in March 2015

General information
- Location: Yamato, Jōetsu-shi, Niigata-ken 943-0861; Japan
- Coordinates: 37.0813°N 138.2480°E
- Operator: JR East (Shinkansen section); Echigo Tokimeki Railway (Conventional Railway)
- Lines: Hokuriku Shinkansen; ■ Myōkō Haneuma Line
- Platforms: 2 island platforms (Shinkansen); 1 island platform (Haneuma Line)
- Tracks: 6
- Train operators: JR East; JR West; Echigo Tokimeki Railway

Other information
- Status: Staffed ("Midori no Madoguchi" )

History
- Opened: 14 March 2015; 11 years ago

Passengers
- 2,131 (FY2017, JR); 394 (FY2017, Echigo Tokimeki)

Services
Preceding station	JR East	Following station
through to JR West	Hokuriku Shinkansen Hakutaka	Iiyama towards Tokyo
Preceding station	JR West	Following station
Itoigawa towards Tsuruga	Hokuriku Shinkansen Hakutaka	through to JR East
Preceding station	Echigo TOKImeki	Following station
Arai One-way operation	Shirayuki	Takada towards Naoetsu
Kita-Arai towards Myōkō-Kōgen	Myōkō Haneuma Line	Minami-Takada towards Naoetsu
Location
- Location within Myoko Haneuma Line Location within Japan

Jōetsumyōkō Station (上越妙高駅, Jōetsumyōkō-eki) is an interchange railway station in Jōetsu, Niigata, Japan, operated by East Japan Railway Company (JR East), West Japan Railway Company (JR West) and the third-sector railway operator Echigo Tokimeki Railway. It opened in March 2015.

== Lines ==
Jōetsumyōkō Station is served by the Echigo Tokimeki Railway Myōkō Haneuma Line and the high-speed Hokuriku Shinkansen, which opened for service on 14 March 2015. It replaced Wakinoda Station on the Shinetsu Main Line, located approximately 120 m away. The journey from Tokyo via the Hokuriku Shinkansen takes 1 hour 48 minutes. Only Hakutaka services stop at Jōetsumyōkō on the Hokuriku Shinkansen.

== Station layout ==
The new station consists of two elevated island platforms serving four tracks on the Hokuriku Shinkansen, with a ground-level island platform serving two tracks for the Myōkō Haneuma Line. The station has a "Midori no Madoguchi" staffed ticket office and also a "View Plaza" travel agent.

=== Platforms ===
1	■ Myōkō Haneuma Line	for Myōkō-Kōgen
2	■ Myōkō Haneuma Line	for Naoetsu
11/12	■ Hokuriku Shinkansen	for Nagano, Takasaki, Tokyo
13/14	■ Hokuriku Shinkansen	for Toyama, Kanazawa, Tsuruga

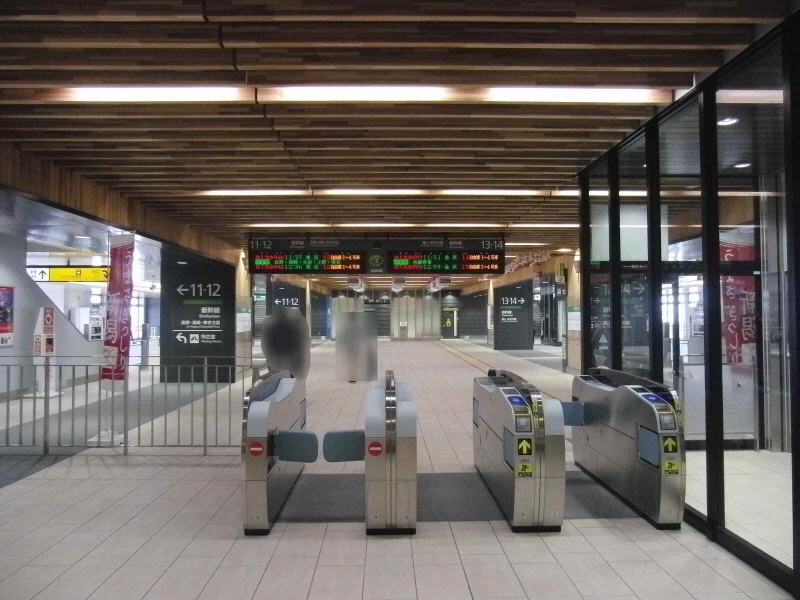
The ticket barriers leading to the Shinkansen platforms

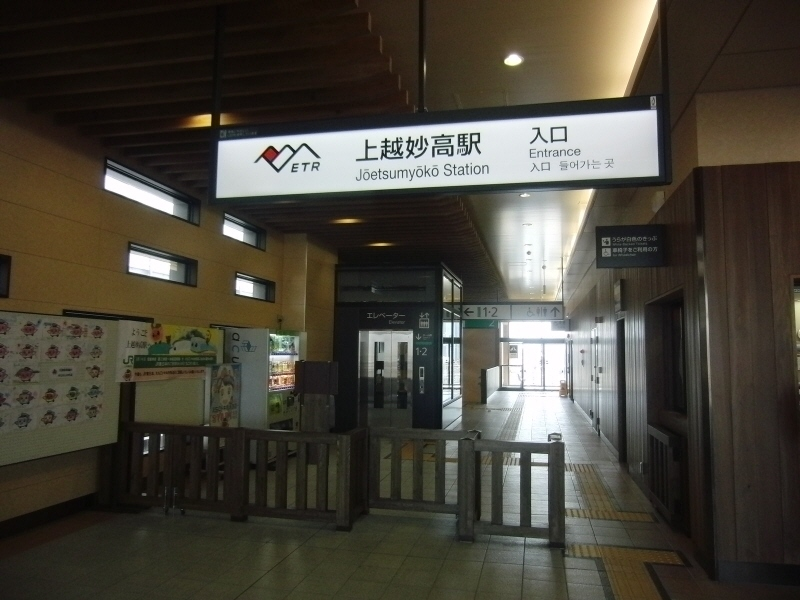
The ticket barriers leading to the Haneuma Line platform

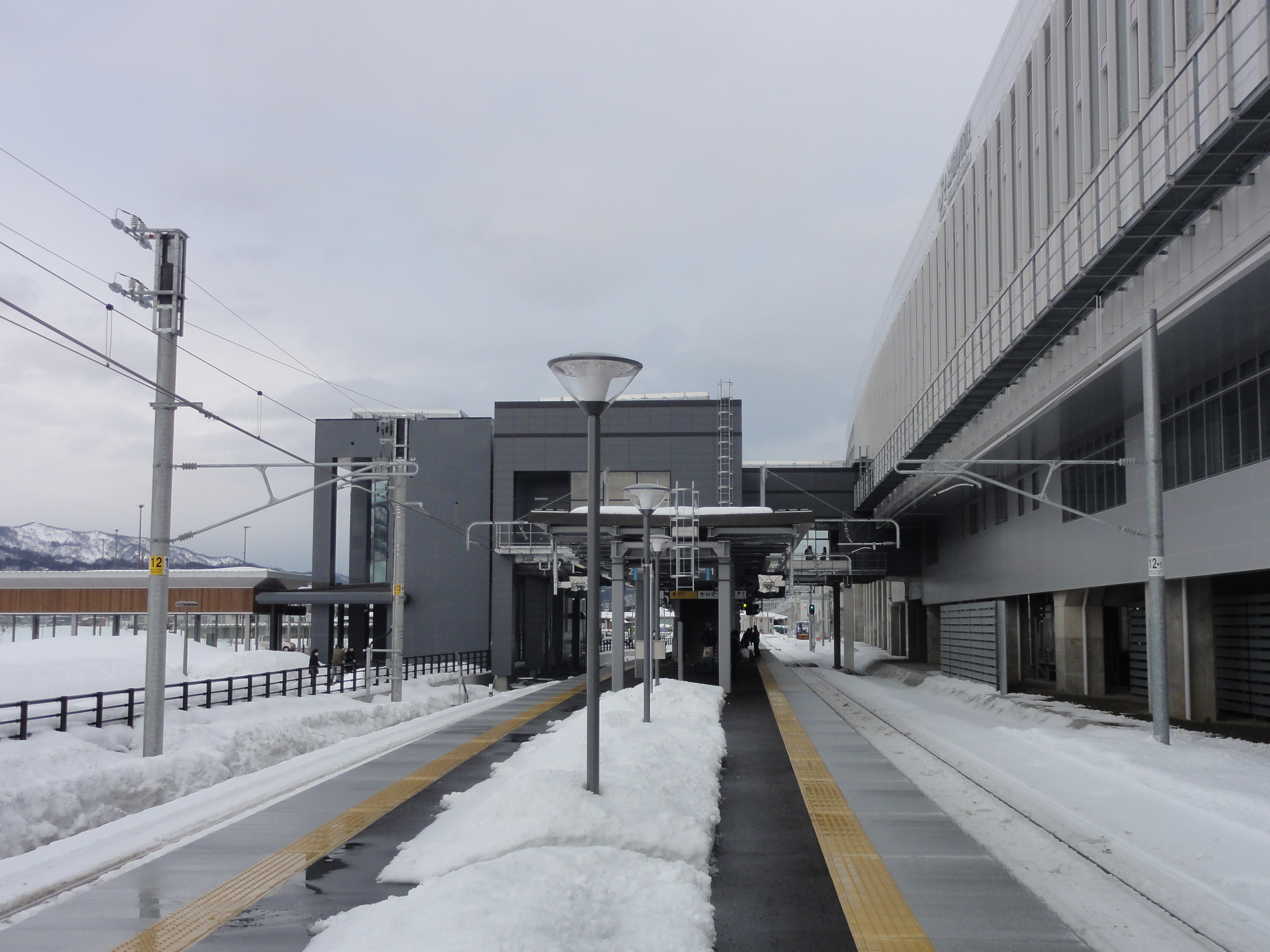
The Haneuma Line platform in January 2015

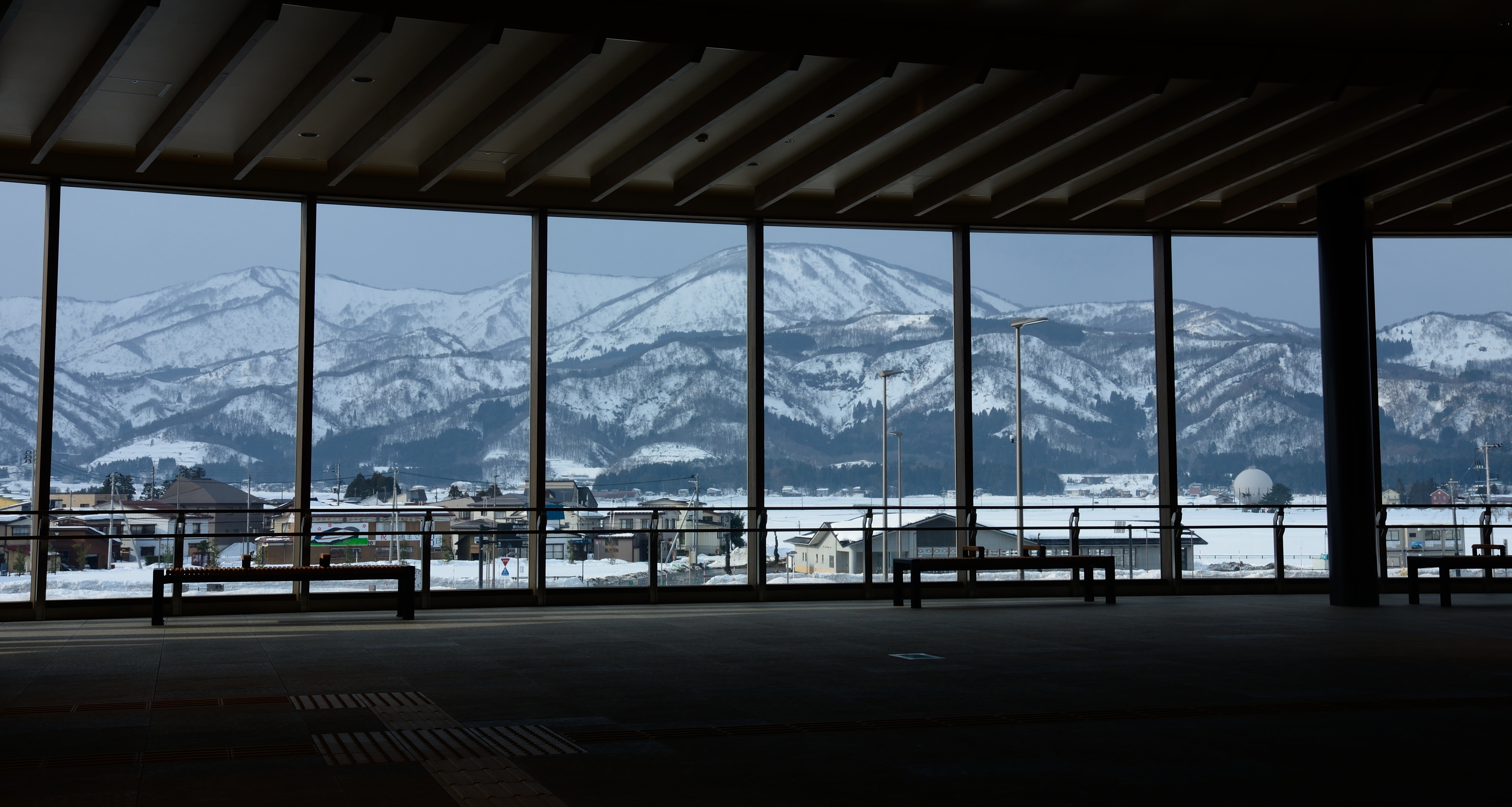
View from the observation deck

== History ==
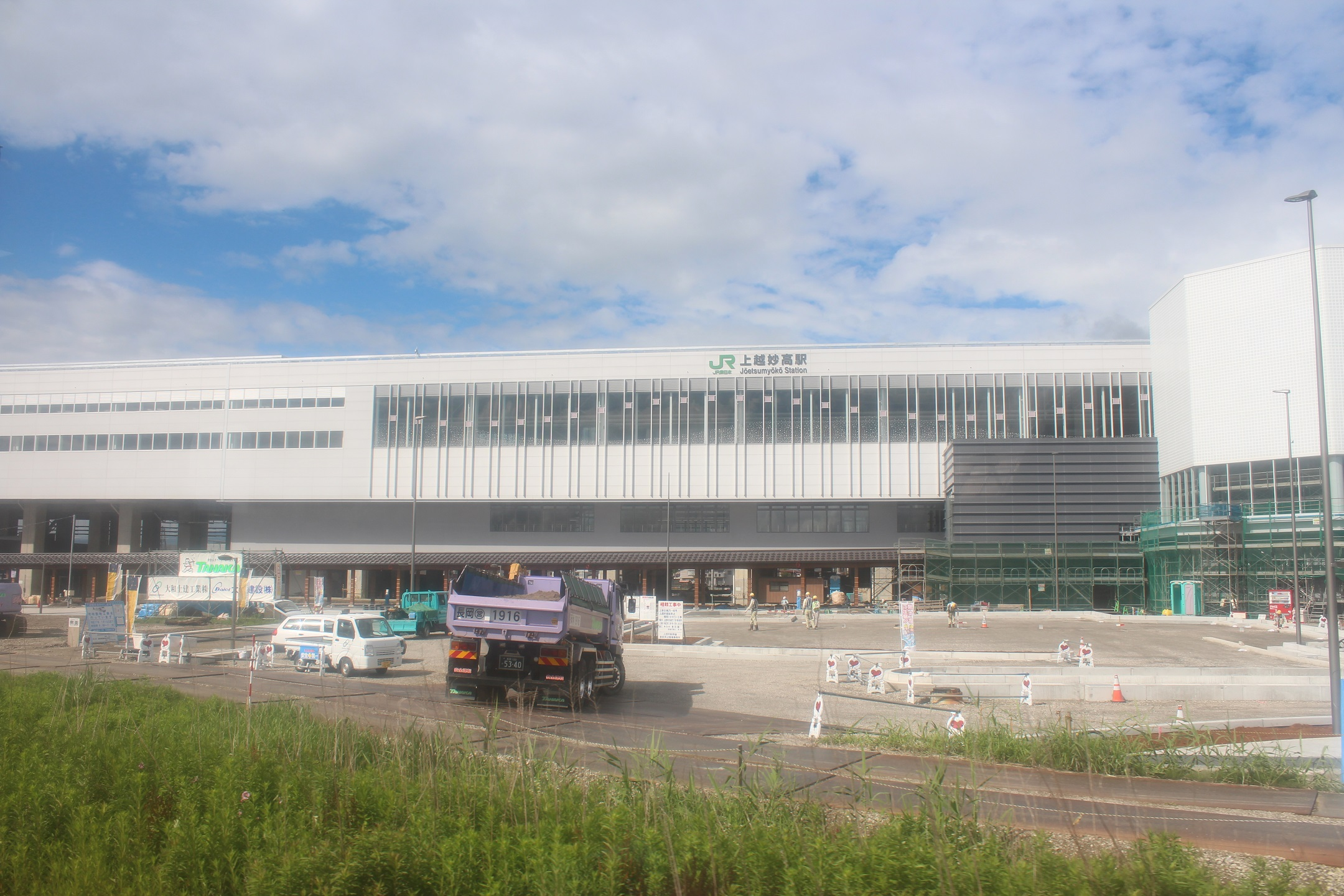
Jōetsumyōkō Station under construction in July 2014

Initially provisionally named Jōetsu Station (上越駅), the name Jōetsumyōkō Station was formally announced in June 2013. Construction was completed in October 2014. It opened on 14 March 2015, coinciding with the opening of the Hokuriku Shinkansen extension from Nagano.

== Passenger statistics ==
In fiscal year 2017, the Myōkō Hanauma Line portion of the station was used by an average of 934 passengers daily (boarding passengers only). In fiscal year 2017, the JR portion of the station was used by an average of 2,131 passengers daily (boarding passengers only).

== Surrounding area ==
The station is located on the southern side of the Takada district of Jōetsu city, about 1.5 km from the border with Myōkō. The area was largely rice paddies with some houses, shops and factories along nearby Japan National Route 18; however, with the opening of the Shinkansen line, the area is rapidly urbanising.

== See also ==
- List of railway stations in Japan
