= Minami-Takada Station =

Railway station in Jōetsu, Niigata Prefecture, Japan

Minami-Takada Station 南高田駅
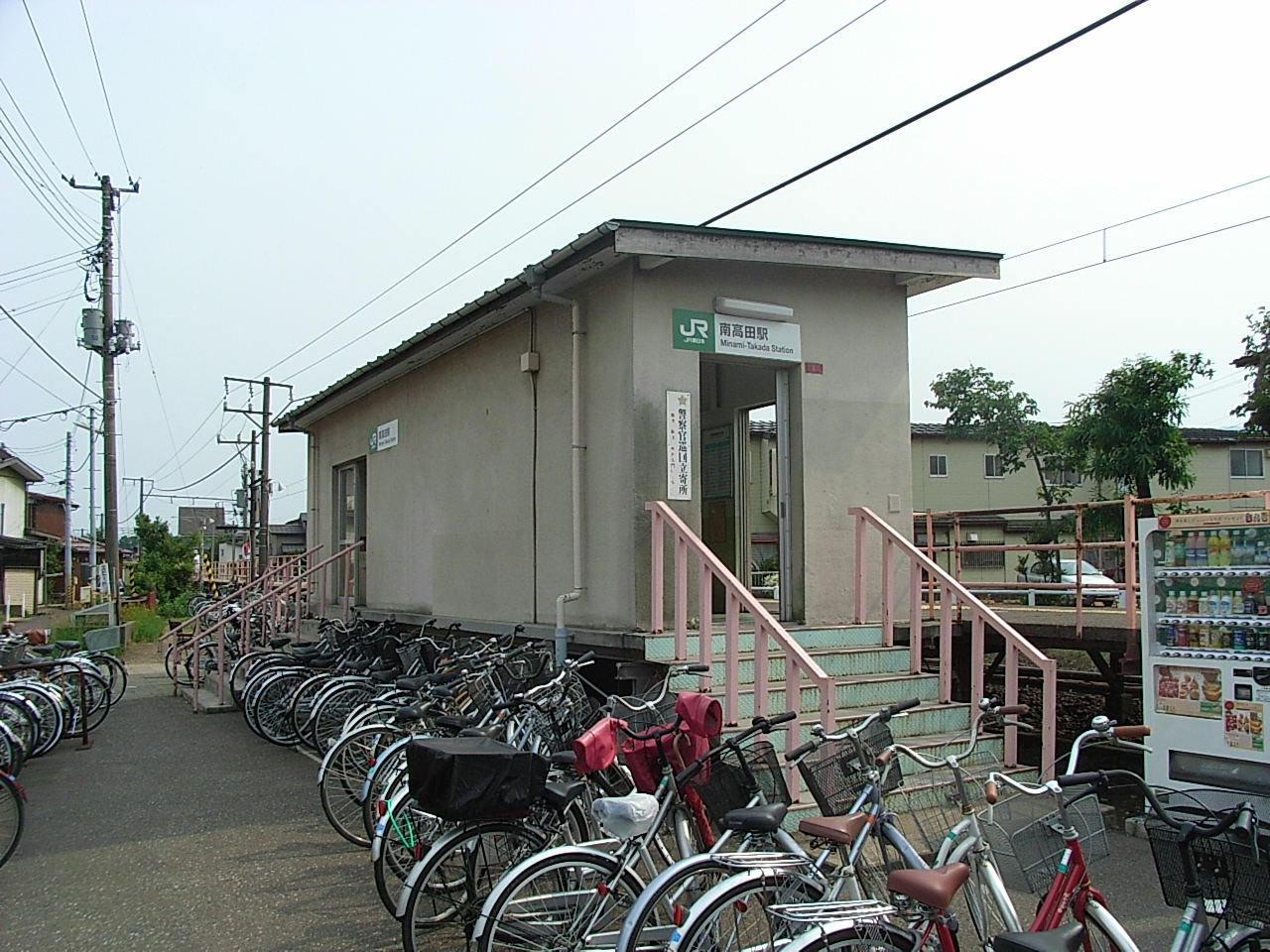
- Minami-Takada Station in June 2009

General information
- Location: Minami-Takada-cho, Jōetsu-shi, Niigata-ken 943-0846; Japan
- Coordinates: 37.0970°N 138.2429°E
- Operator: Echigo Tokimeki Railway
- Line: ■ Myoko Haneuma Line
- Distance: 29.0 km from Myōkō-Kōgen
- Platforms: 1 side platform
- Tracks: 1

Other information
- Status: Unstaffed
- Website: Official website

History
- Opened: 10 December 1961

Passengers
- FY2017: 835 daily
Location
- Location within Myoko Haneuma Line Location within Japan

Minami-Takada Station (南高田駅, Minami-Takada-eki) is a railway station on the Myōkō Haneuma Line in the city of Jōetsu, Niigata, Japan, operated by the third-sector operating railway company Echigo Tokimeki Railway.

== Lines ==
Minami-Takada Station is served by the 37.7 km Echigo Tokimeki Railway Myōkō Haneuma Line from Myōkō-Kōgen to Naoetsu, and is located 29.0 kilometers from the starting point of the line at Myōkō-Kōgen and 66.3 kilometers from Nagano.

== Station layout ==
The station has one side platform serving a single bi-directional track, with the station building located directly on the platform. The station is unattended.

== Adjacent stations ==
«	Service	»
Myōkō Haneuma Line
Shirayuki: Does not stop at this station
Jōetsumyōkō	Local	Takada

== History ==
The station opened on 10 December 1961 on the Shinetsu Main Line. With the privatization of JNR on 1 April 1987, the station came under the control of JR East.

From 14 March 2015, with the opening of the Hokuriku Shinkansen extension from Nagano to Kanazawa, local passenger operations over sections of the Shinetsu Main Line running roughly parallel to the new shinkansen line were reassigned to different third-sector railway operating companies. From this date, Minami-Takada Station became a station on the Echigo Tokimeki Railway Myōkō Haneuma Line.

== Passenger statistics ==
In fiscal 2017, the station was used by an average of 835 passengers daily (boarding passengers only).

== Surrounding area ==
- Takada Commercial High School

== See also ==
- List of railway stations in Japan
