= Shirayuki (train) =

Train service in Niigata Prefecture, Japan

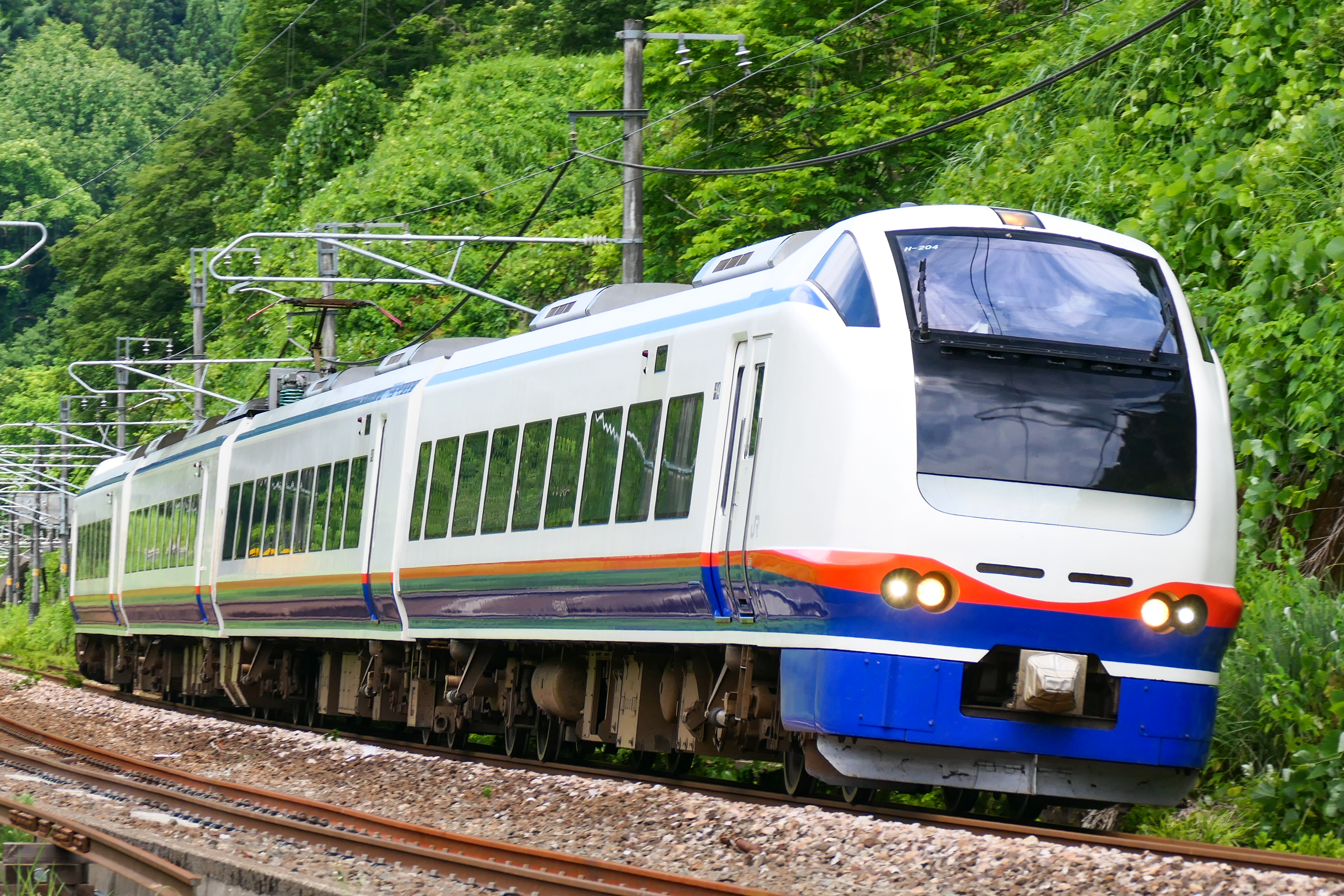
- A E653-1100 series EMU for use on Shirayuki limited express services from July 2023

Overview
- Service type: Express
- Status: Operational
- Locale: Japan
- First service: 20 April 1963 (Express); 14 March 2015 (Limited express)
- Current operators: JR East, Echigo Tokimeki Railway
- Former operator: JNR

Route
- Termini: Niigata; Jōetsumyōkō / Arai
- Service frequency: 5 return workings daily
- Lines used: Shin'etsu Main Line, Echigo Tokimeki Railway Myōkō Haneuma Line

On-board services
- Class: Ordinary

Technical
- Rolling stock: E653-1100 series
- Track gauge: 1,067 mm (3 ft 6 in)

The Shirayuki (しらゆき) is a limited express service operated by East Japan Railway Company (JR East) between Niigata and Jōetsumyōkō in Japan since 14 March 2015. The name Shirayuki was also previously used for an express service operated by Japanese National Railways (JNR) from 1963 until 1982.

== Service outline ==
The Shirayuki services operate between Niigata and Jōetsumyōkō via the Shin'etsu Main Line and Echigo Tokimeki Railway Myōkō Haneuma Line, with some services extended to Arai. A total of five return workings operate daily.

== Rolling stock ==
Services use a fleet of four four-car E653-1100 series EMUs converted from former Joban Line E653 series trainsets.

== Formations ==
Trains are normally formed as four-car monoclass trainsets as shown below, with car 4 at the Niigata (northern) end. All cars are no-smoking.

Car No.	1	2	3	4
Accommodation	Reserved	Reserved	Non-reserved	Non-reserved

== History ==
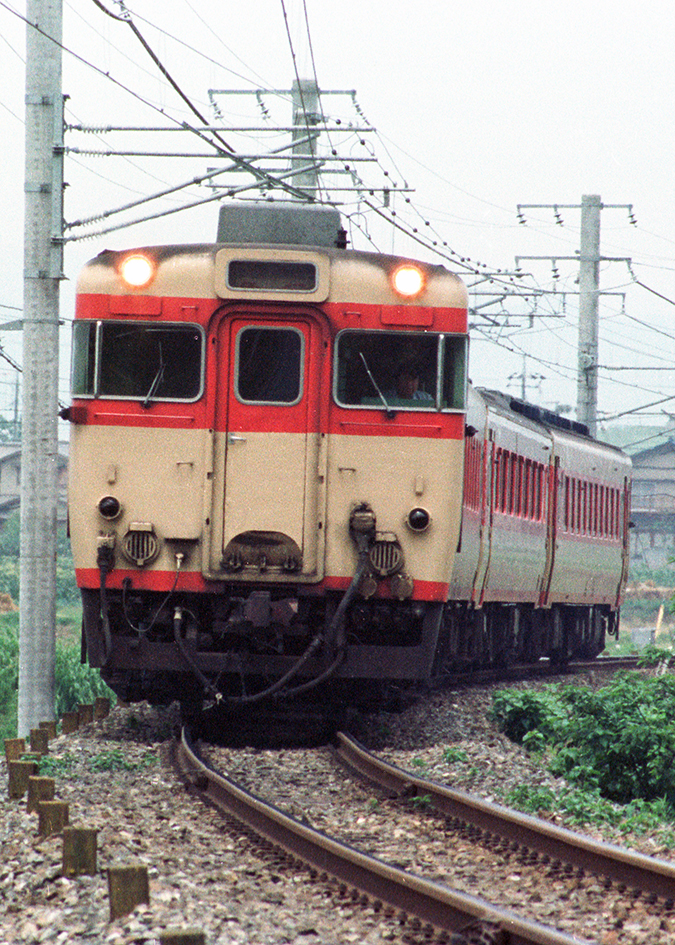
A JNR KiHa 58 series DMU

The original Shirayuki train service was an express service which operated between Kanazawa and Aomori from 20 April 1963 until 15 November 1982 using KiHa 58 series diesel multiple unit (DMU) trains.

== See also ==
- List of named passenger trains of Japan
