= Arai Station (Niigata) =

Railway station in Myōkō, Niigata Prefecture, Japan

Arai Station 新井駅
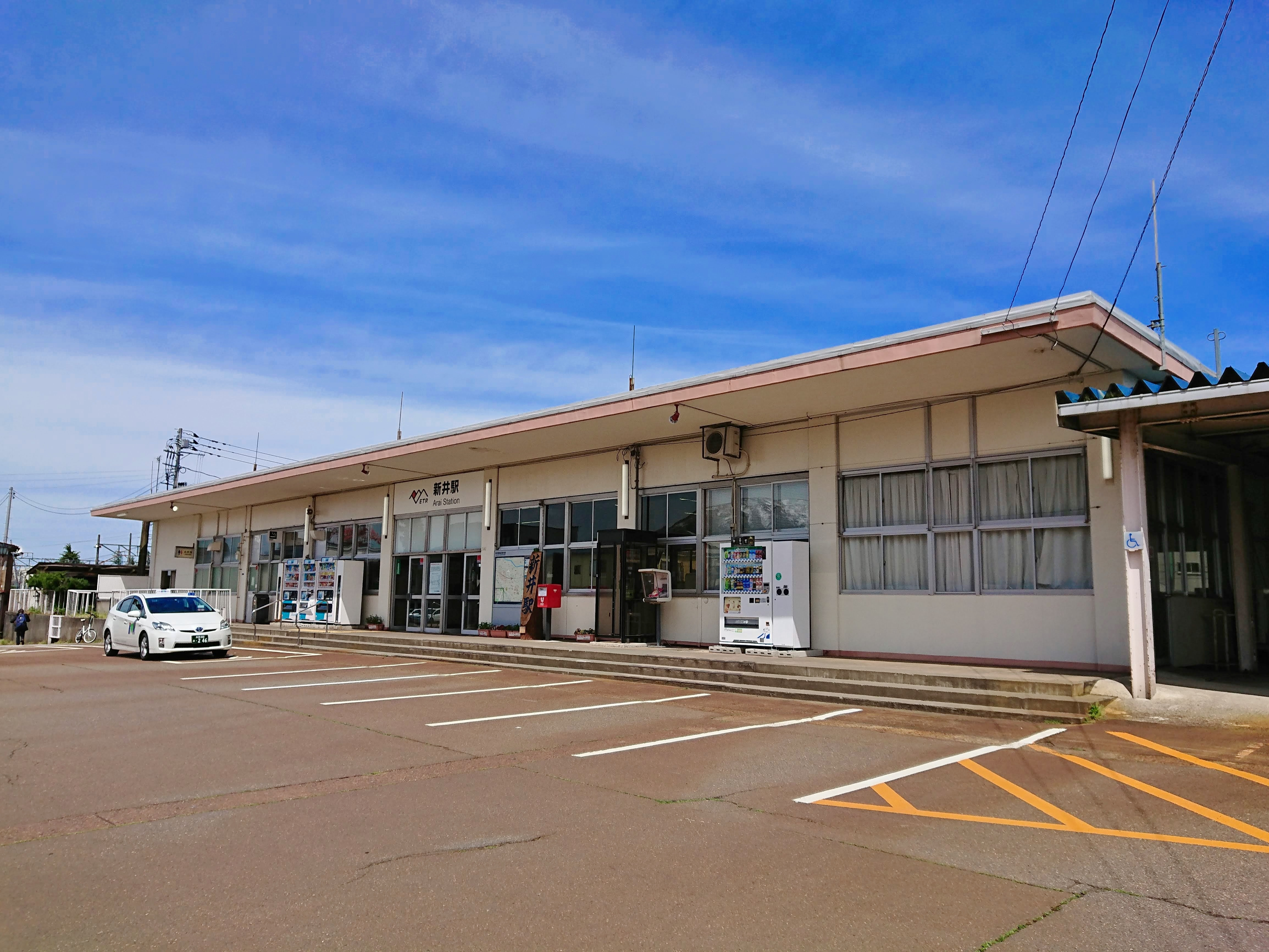
- Arai Station in April 2019

General information
- Location: 1 Sakaecho, Myōkō-shi, Niigata-ken 944–0044; Japan
- Coordinates: 37°01′36″N 138°15′20″E
- Operator: Echigo Tokimeki Railway; JR Freight
- Line: ■ Myoko Haneuma Line
- Distance: 21.0 kilometres (13.0 mi) from Myōkō-Kōgen
- Platforms: 1 island + 1 side platforms
- Tracks: 3

Other information
- Status: Staffed
- Website: Official website

History
- Opened: 15 August 1886

Passengers
- FY2017: 973 daily
Location
- Location within Myoko Haneuma Line Location within Japan

Arai Station (新井駅, Arai-eki) is a railway station in the city of Myōkō, Niigata, Japan, operated by the third-sector operator Echigo Tokimeki Railway. It is also a freight terminal for the Japan Freight Railway Company.

== Lines ==
Arai Station is served by the 37.7 km Echigo Tokimeki Railway Myōkō Haneuma Line from Myōkō-Kōgen to Naoetsu, and is located 21.0 kilometers from the starting point of the line at Myōkō-Kōgen and 58.3 kilometers from Nagano. Two return Shirayuki limited express services and two limited-stop "Rapid" services operate daily between Arai and Niigata.

== Station layout ==
The station has one side platform and one island platform connected by a footbridge. The station is staffed.

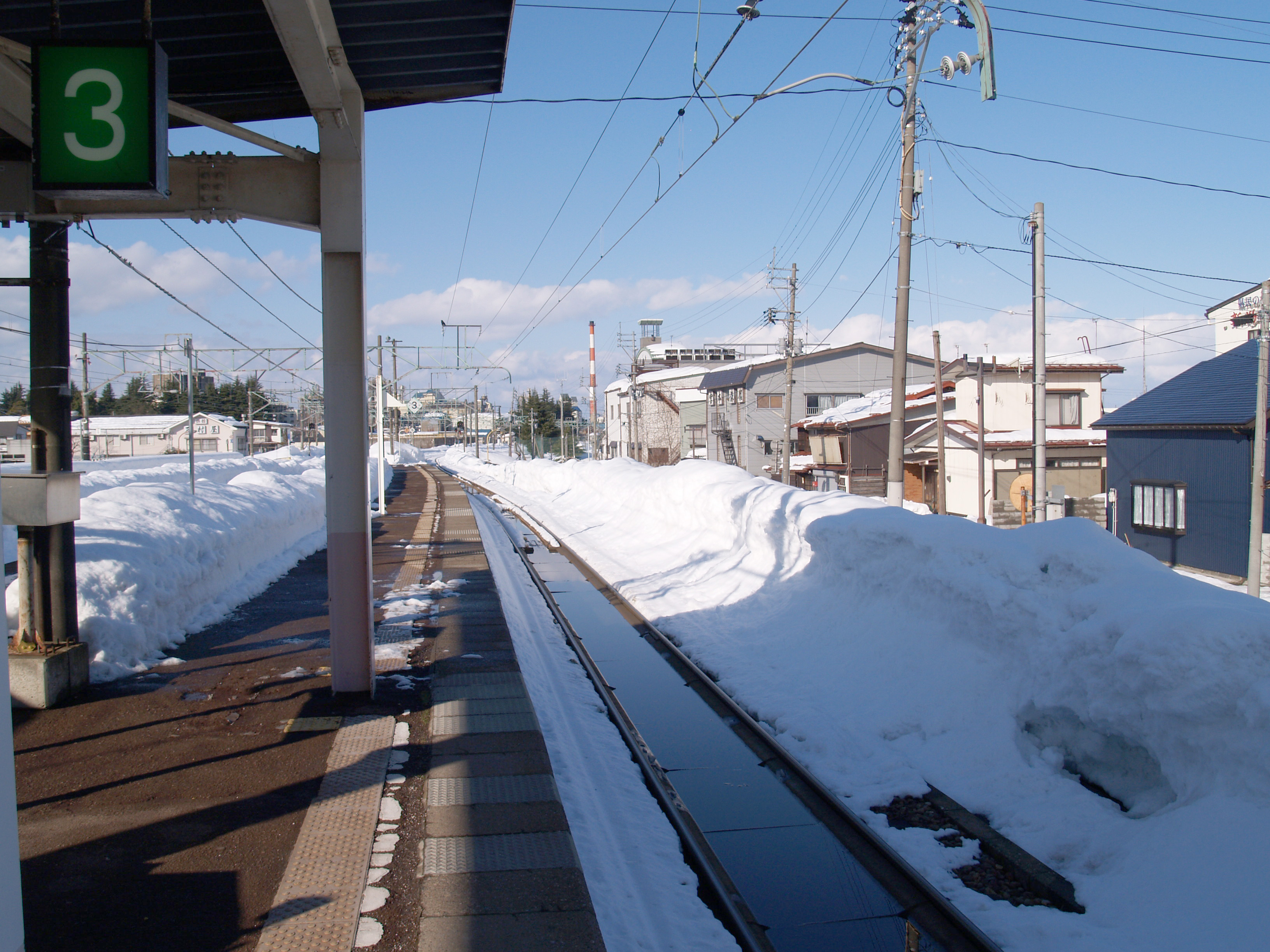
The platforms in January 2010

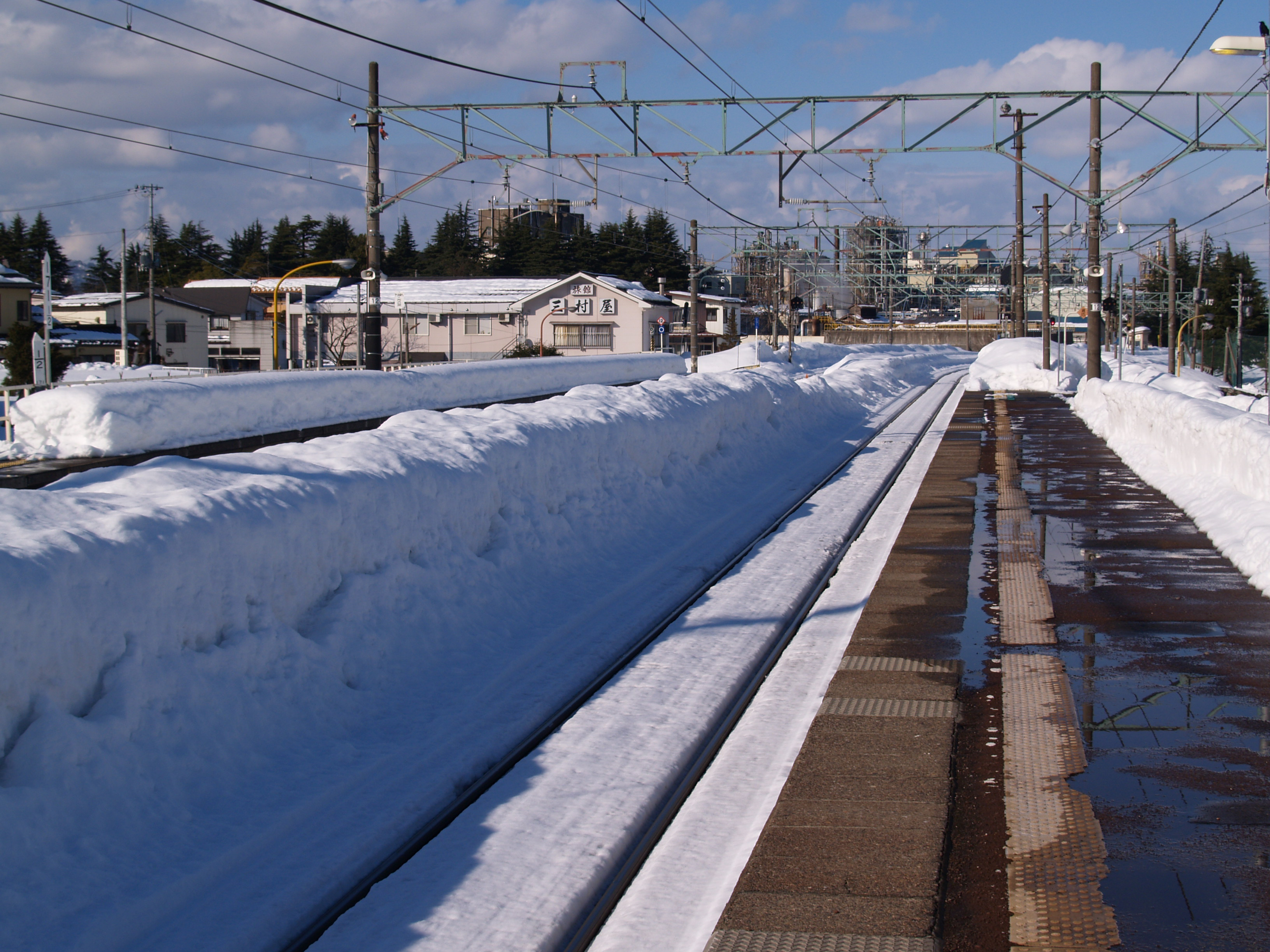
The platforms in January 2010

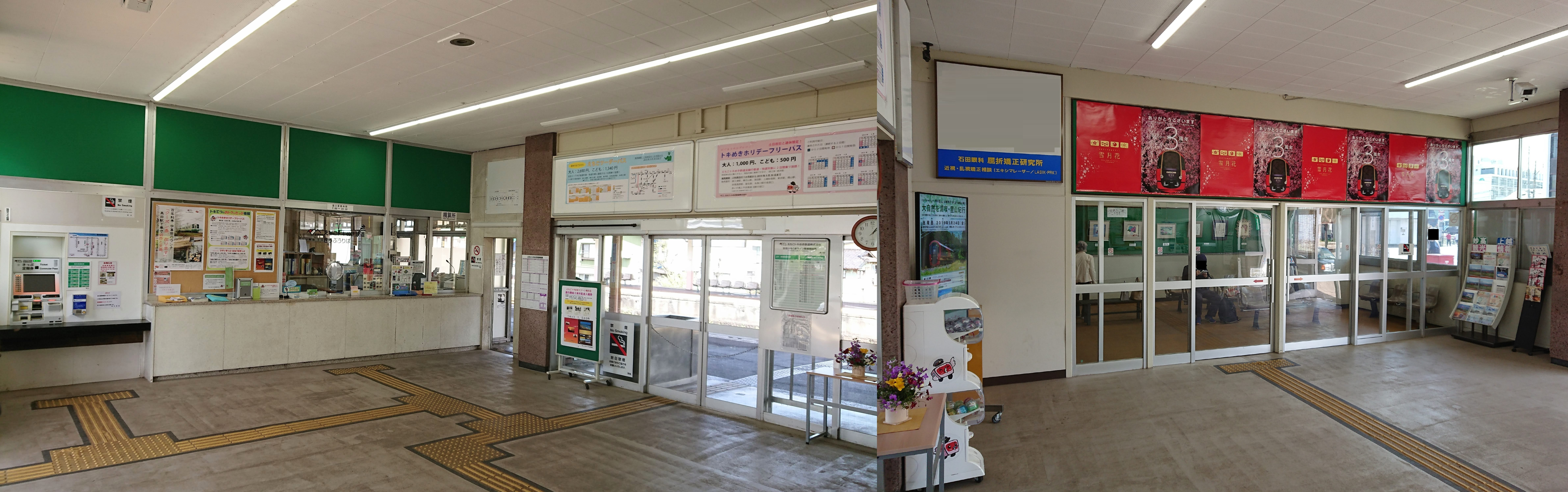
Station interior, April 2019

=== Platforms ===
1	■ Myōkō Haneuma Line	for Myōkō-Kōgen, Naoetsu, and Niigata
2	■ Myōkō Haneuma Line	for Myōkō-Kōgen
3	■ Myōkō Haneuma Line	for Myōkō-Kōgen, Naoetsu, and Niigata

== Adjacent stations ==
«	Service	»
Myōkō Haneuma Line
Terminus	Shirayuki	Jōetsumyōkō
Nihongi	Local	Kita-Arai

== History ==
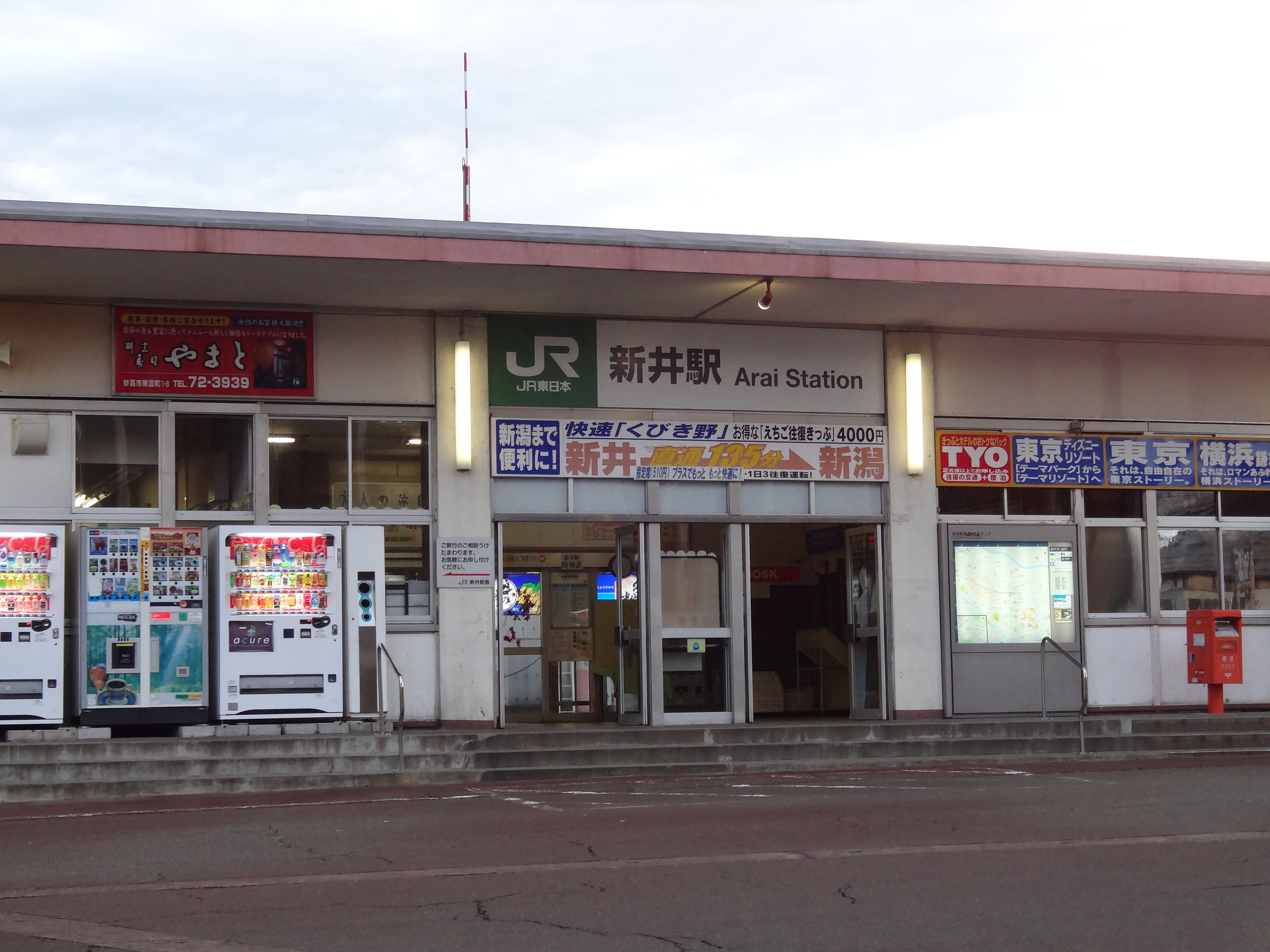
The station in November 2013 while operated by JR East

Arai Station opened on 15 August 1886. With the privatization of Japanese National Railways (JNR) on 1 April 1987, the station came under the control of JR East.

From 14 March 2015, with the opening of the Hokuriku Shinkansen extension from Nagano to Kanazawa, local passenger operations over sections of the Shinetsu Main Line and Hokuriku Main Line running roughly parallel to the new shinkansen line were reassigned to third-sector railway operating companies. From this date, Arai Station was transferred to the ownership of the third-sector operating company Echigo Tokimeki Railway.

== Passenger statistics ==
In fiscal 2017, the station was used by an average of 973 passengers daily (boarding passengers only).

== Surrounding area ==
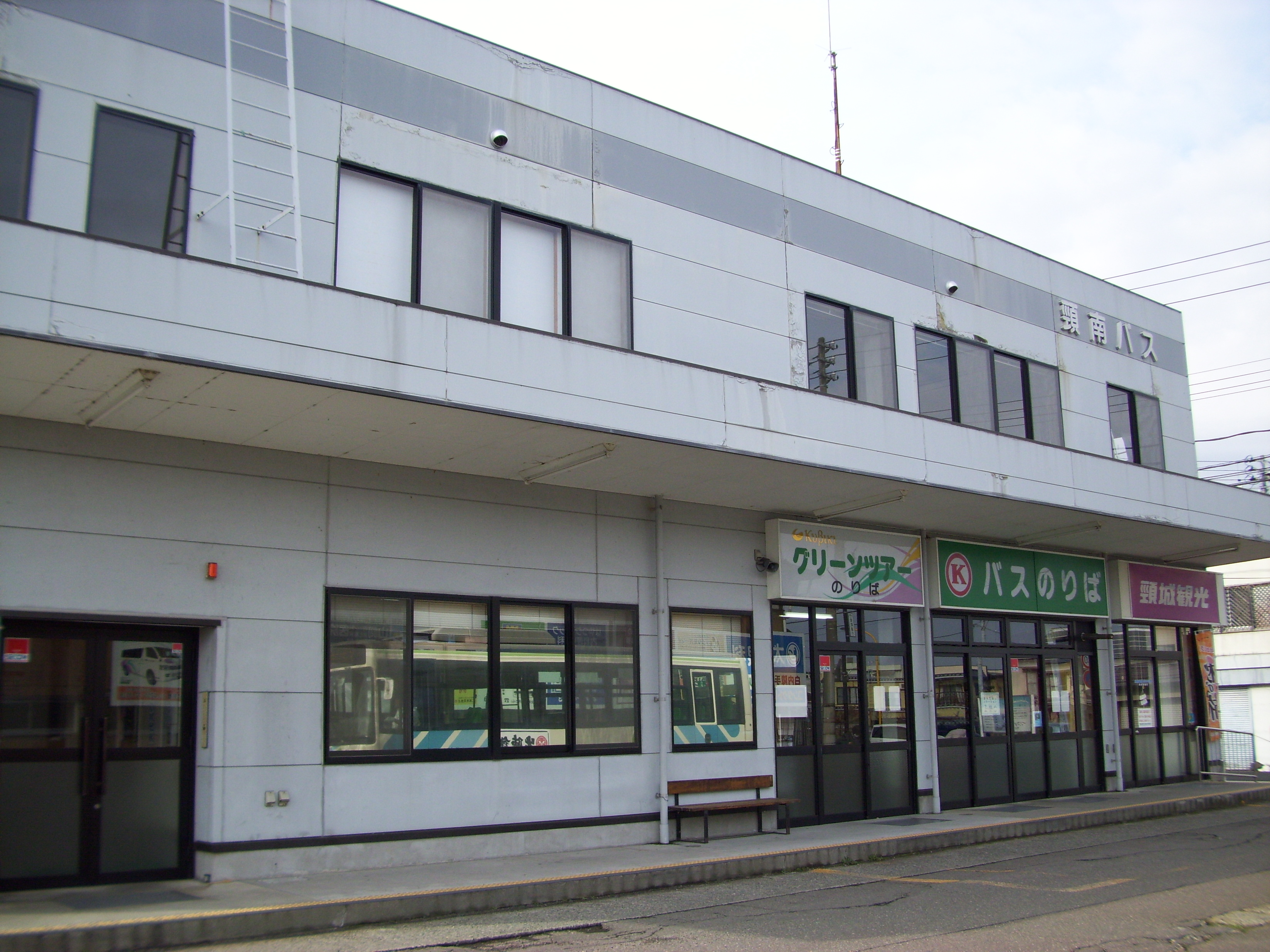
Arai Bus Terminal

- Myoko City Office
- Niigata Prefectural Arai High School

== See also ==
- List of railway stations in Japan
