= Nishi-Ueda Station =

Railway station in Ueda, Nagano Prefecture, Japan

Nishi-Ueda Station 西上田駅
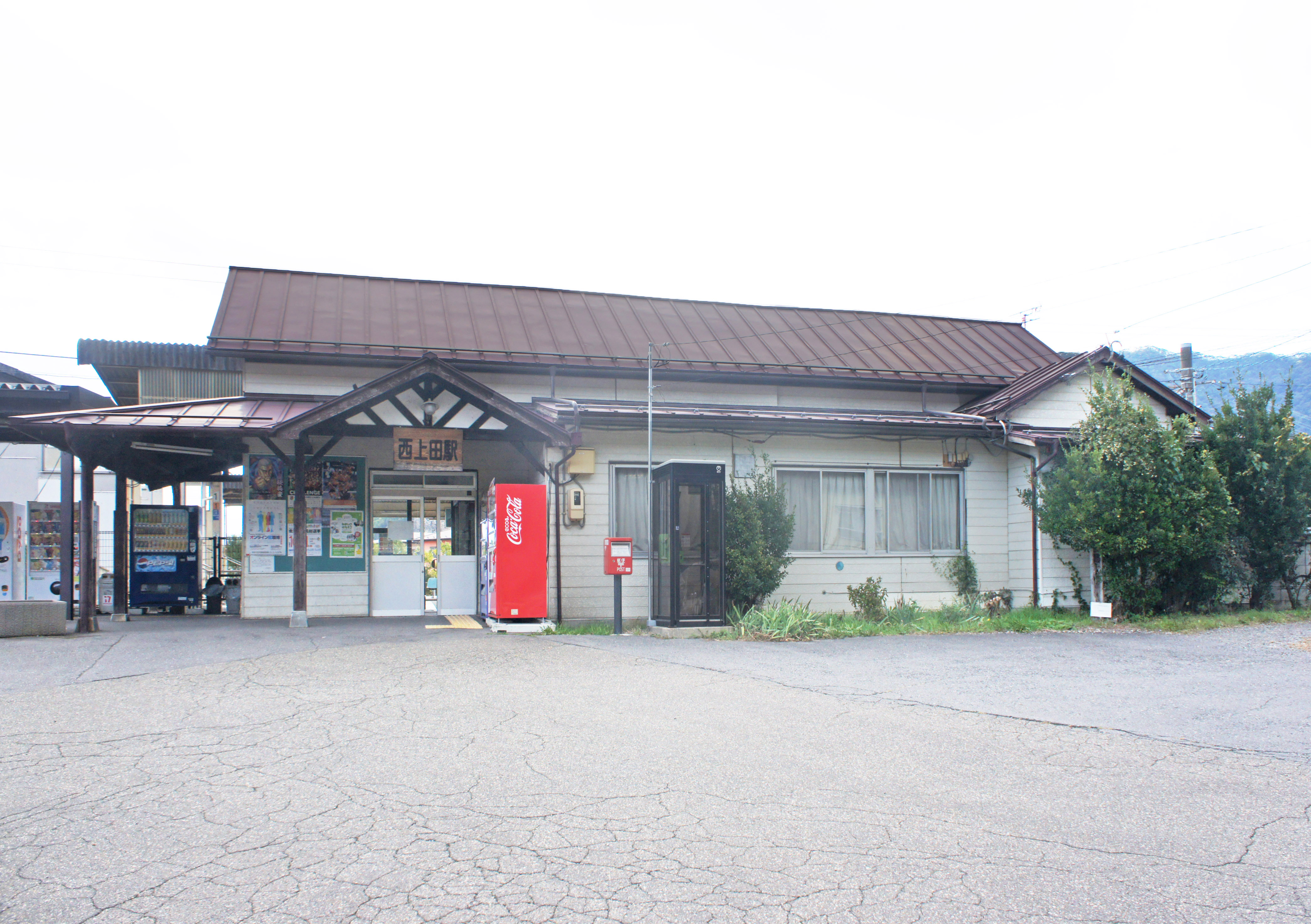
- Nishi-Ueda Station in October 2021

General information
- Location: Shimo-Shiojiri, Ueda-shi, Nagano-ken; Japan
- Coordinates: 36.4171°N 138.2086°E
- Elevation: 421 m (1,381 ft)
- Operator: Shinano Railway; JR Freight
- Line: ■ Shinano Railway Line
- Distance: 44.4 km from Karuizawa
- Platforms: 1 side + 1 island platform
- Tracks: 3

Other information
- Website: Official website

History
- Opened: 1 June 1920
- Former names: Kita-Shiojiri Station (until 1956)

Passengers
- FY2011: 1,764 daily
Location
- Location within Nagano Prefecture Location within Japan

Nishi-Ueda Station (西上田駅, Nishi-Ueda-eki) is a railway station on the third-sector railway operating company Shinano Railway, in the city of Ueda, Nagano, Japan. The station also has a freight terminal for the Japan Freight Railway Company (JR Freight).

== Lines ==
Nishi-Ueda Station is served by the Shinano Railway Line and is 44.4 kilometers from the starting point of the line at Karuizawa Station.

== Station layout ==
The station consists of two ground-level island platforms, connected to the station building by a footbridge. However, only one side of one of the island platforms is used, giving the station a one side/one island platform configuration serving three tracks.

=== Platforms ===
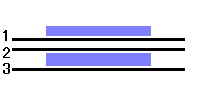
→:for Ueda ←:for Tekuno-Sakaki

1	■ Shinano Railway Line	for Ueda, Komoro and Karuizawa
2	■ Shinano Railway Line	
3	■ Shinano Railway Line	for Togura, Shinonoi and Nagano

== Adjacent stations ==
«	Service	»
Shinano Railway Line
Ueda	Local	Tekuno-Sakaki

== History ==
The station opened on 1 June 1920 as Kita-Shiojiri Station (北塩尻駅). It was renamed Nishi-Ueda on 10 April 1956.

== Passenger statistics ==
In fiscal 2011, the station was used by an average of 1,764 passengers daily.

== Surrounding area ==
- National Route 18
- Ueda Nishi High School

== See also ==
- List of railway stations in Japan
