= Shinano-Kokubunji Station =

Railway station in Ueda, Nagano Prefecture, Japan

Shinano-Kokubunji Station 信濃国分寺駅
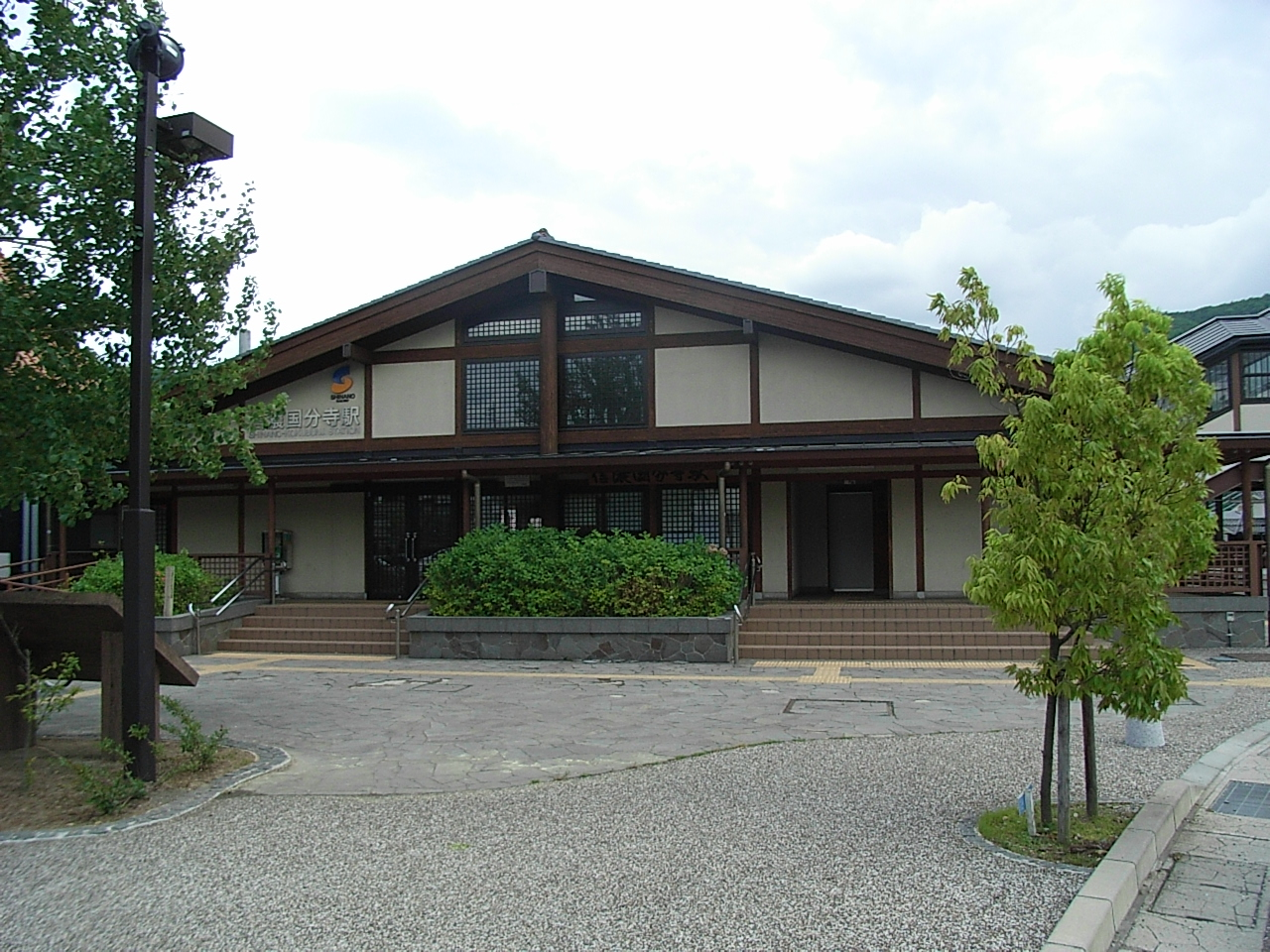
- Shinano-Kokubunji Station in May 2009

General information
- Location: 1246-5 Kokubu, Ueda-shi, Nagano-ken 386-0016; Japan
- Coordinates: 36.3785°N 138.2735°E
- Elevation: 467 m (1,532 ft)
- Operator: Shinano Railway
- Line: ■ Shinano Railway Line
- Distance: 37.1 km from Karuizawa
- Platforms: 2 side platforms
- Tracks: 2

Other information
- Website: Official website

History
- Opened: 29 March 2002

Passengers
- FY2011: 1,114 daily
Location
- Location within Nagano Prefecture Location within Japan

Shinano-Kokubunji Station (信濃国分寺駅, Shinano-Kokubunji-eki) is a railway station on the Shinano Railway Line in the city of Ueda, Nagano, Japan, operated by the third-sector railway operating company Shinano Railway.

== Lines ==
Shinano-Kokubunji Station is served by the 65.1 km Shinano Railway Line and is 37.1 kilometers from the starting point of the line at Karuizawa Station.

== Station layout ==
The station consists of two ground-level opposed side platforms serving two tracks, connected to the station building by a footbridge.

=== Platforms ===
1	■ Shinano Railway Line	for Komoro and Karuizawa
2	■ Shinano Railway Line	for Ueda, Shinonoi, and Nagano

== Adjacent stations ==
«	Service	»
Shinano Railway Line
Ōya	Local	Ueda

== History ==
The station opened on 29 March 2002.

== Passenger statistics ==
In fiscal 2011, the station was used by an average of 1,114 passengers daily.

== Surrounding area ==
- Site of Shinano Kokubun-ji
- National Route 18

== See also ==
- List of railway stations in Japan
