= Tanaka Station =

Railway station in Tōmi, Nagano Prefecture, Japan

Tanaka Station 田中駅
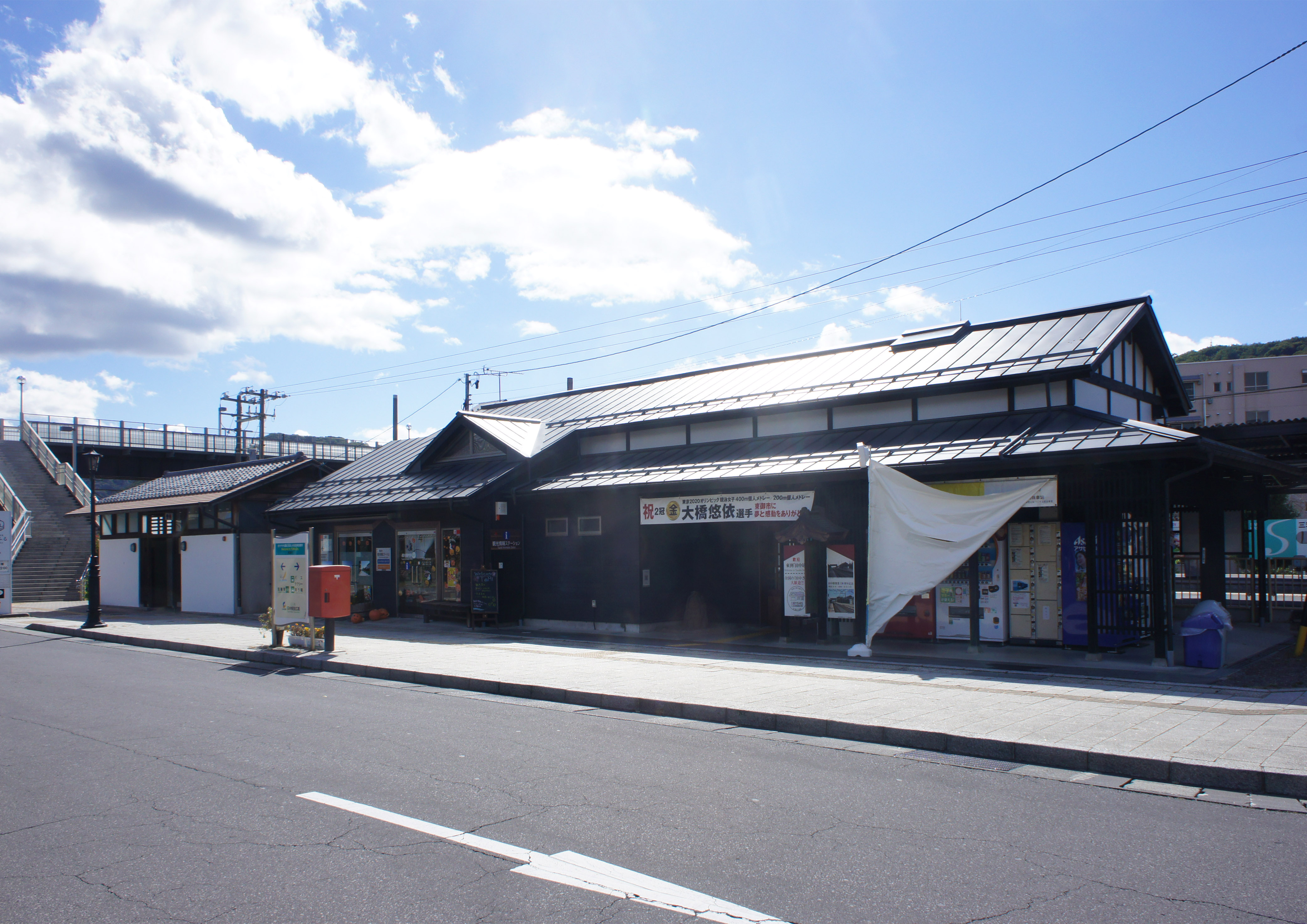
- Tanaka Station in October 2021

General information
- Location: 279 Tanaka, Tōmi-shi, Nagano-ken 389-0516; Japan
- Coordinates: 36.3540°N 138.3289°E
- Elevation: 512 m (1,680 ft)
- Operator: Shinano Railway
- Line: ■ Shinano Railway Line
- Distance: 31.3 km from Karuizawa
- Platforms: 1 side + 1 island platforms
- Tracks: 3

Other information
- Status: Staffed
- Website: Official website

History
- Opened: 1 December 1888

Passengers
- FY2011: 2,446 daily
Location
- Location within Nagano Prefecture Location within Japan

Tanaka Station (田中駅, Tanaka-eki) is a railway station on the Shinano Railway Line in the city of Tōmi, Nagano, Japan, operated by the third-sector railway operating company Shinano Railway.

== Lines ==
Tanaka Station is served by the 65.1 km Shinano Railway Line and is 31.3 kilometers from the starting point of the line at Karuizawa Station.

== Station layout ==
The station consists of one ground-level side platform and ne ground-level island platform serving three tracks, connected to the station building by a footbridge. The station is staffed.

=== Platforms ===
1	■ Shinano Railway Line	for Komoro and Karuizawa
2	■ Shinano Railway Line	
3	■ Shinano Railway Line	for Ueda, Shinonoi, and Nagano

== Adjacent stations ==
«	Service	»
Shinano Railway Line
Shigeno	Local	Ōya

== History ==
The station opened on 1 December 1888.

== Passenger statistics ==
In fiscal 2011, the station was used by an average of 2,446 passengers daily.

== Surrounding area ==
- Tōmi City Hall
- National Route 18

== See also ==
- List of railway stations in Japan
