= Sakaki Station =

Railway station in Sakaki, Nagano Prefecture, Japan

Sakaki Station 坂城駅
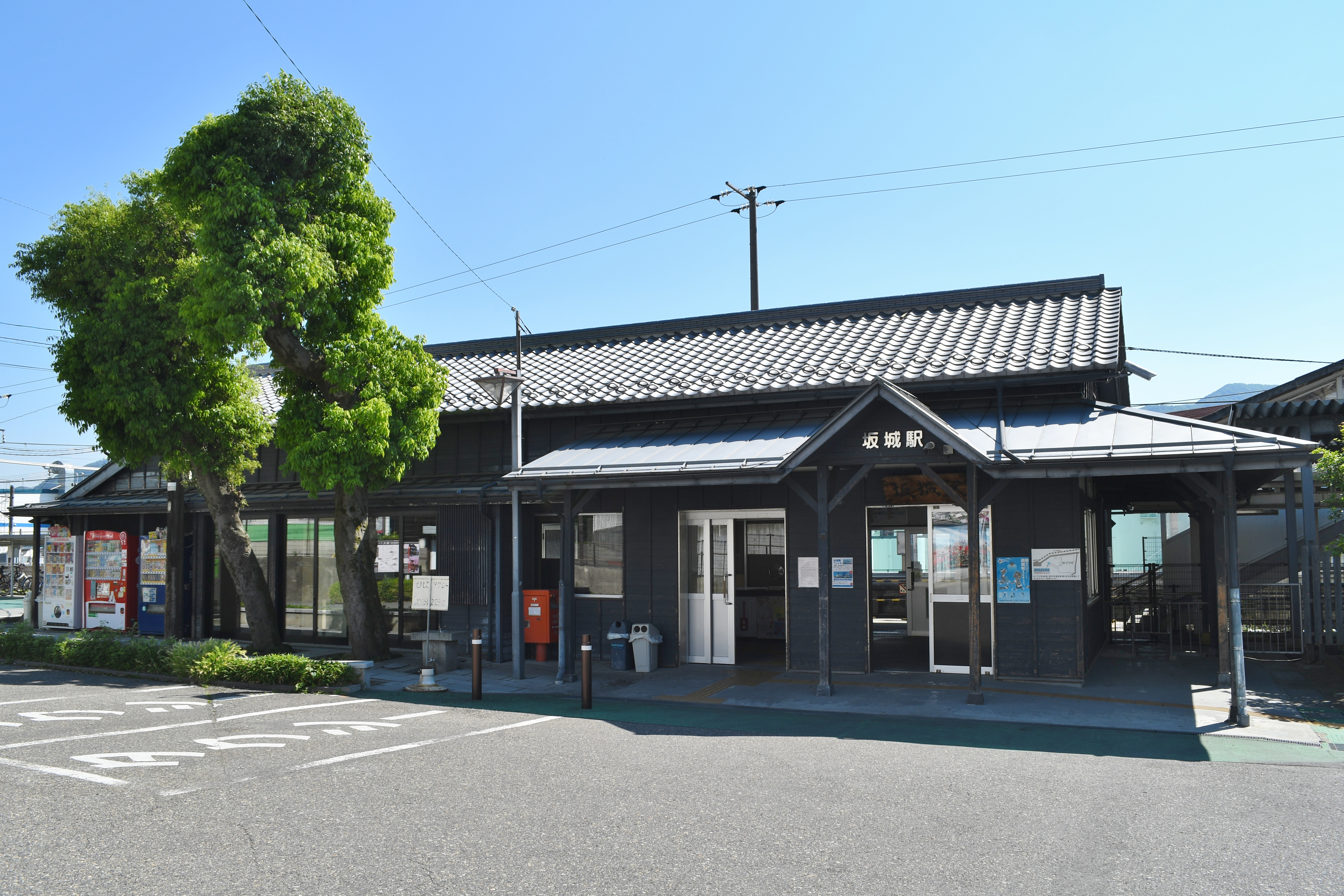
- Sakaki Station entrance in May 2023

General information
- Location: 101-1 Sakaki, Sakaki-machi, Hanishina-gun, Nagano-ken 389-0601; Japan
- Coordinates: 36.4620°N 138.1816°E
- Elevation: 396 m (1,299 ft)
- Operator: Shinano Railway; JR Freight
- Line: ■ Shinano Railway Line
- Distance: 50.4 km from Karuizawa
- Platforms: 1 island platform
- Tracks: 2

Other information
- Status: staffed
- Website: Official website

History
- Opened: 15 August 1888

Passengers
- FY2017: 838 daily
Location
- Location within Nagano Prefecture Location within Japan

Sakaki Station (坂城駅, Sakaki-eki) is a railway station on the Shinano Railway Line in the town of Sakaki, Nagano, Japan, operated by the third-sector railway operating company Shinano Railway. The station also has a freight terminal operated by the Japan Freight Railway Company.

== Lines ==
Sakaki Station is served by the Shinano Railway Line and is 50.4 kilometers from the starting point of the line at Karuizawa Station.

== Station layout ==
The station consists of one ground-level island platform serving two tracks, connected to the station building by a footbridge. The station is staffed.

=== Platforms ===
1	■ Shinano Railway Line	for Ueda, Komoro, and Karuizawa
2	■ Shinano Railway Line	for Togura, Shinonoi, and Nagano

== Adjacent stations ==
«	Service	»
Shinano Railway Line
Tekuno-Sakaki	Local	Togura

== History ==
The station opened on 15 August 1888.

== Passenger statistics ==
In fiscal 2017, the station was used by an average of 838 passengers daily (boarding passengers only).

== Surrounding area ==
- Sakaki Town Hall
- National Route 18

== See also ==
- List of railway stations in Japan
