= Tekuno-Sakaki Station =

Railway station in Sakaki, Nagano Prefecture, Japan

Tekuno-Sakaki Station テクノさかき駅
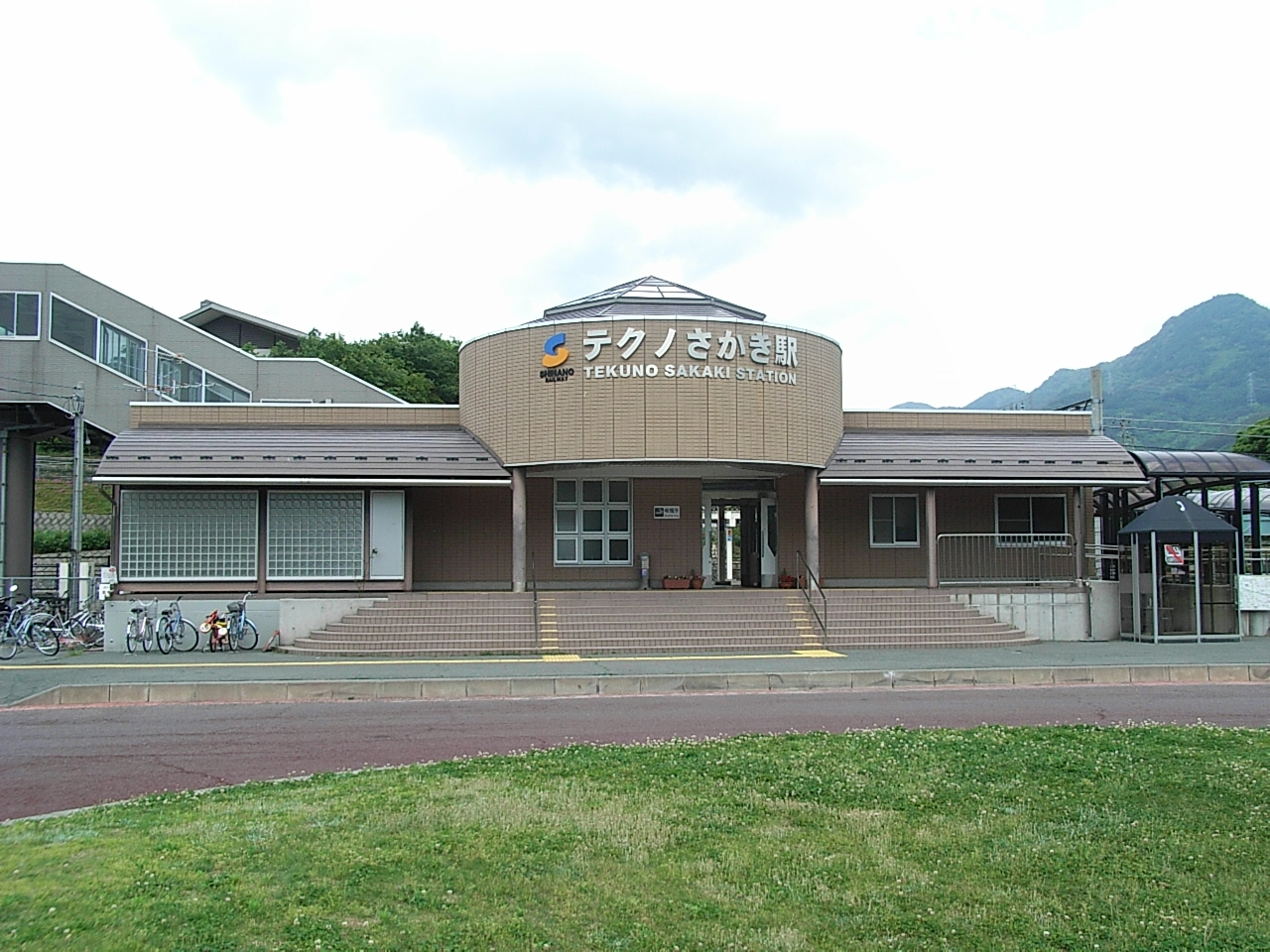
- Tekuno-Sakaki Station in May 2009

General information
- Location: 4910-5 Minamijō, Sakaki-machi, Hanishina-gun, Nagano-ken 389-0603; Japan
- Coordinates: 36.4406°N 138.1884°E
- Elevation: 410 m (1,350 ft)
- Operator: Shinano Railway
- Line: ■ Shinano Railway Line
- Distance: 47.9 km from Karuizawa
- Platforms: 2 side platforms
- Tracks: 2

Other information
- Status: Staffed
- Website: Official website

History
- Opened: 1 April 1999

Passengers
- FY2017: 455 daily
Location
- Location within Nagano Prefecture Location within Japan

Tekuno-Sakaki Station (テクノさかき駅, Tekuno-Sakaki-eki) is a railway station on the Shinano Railway Line in the town of Sakaki, Nagano, Japan, operated by the third-sector railway operating company Shinano Railway.

== Lines ==
Tekuno-Sakaki Station is served by the Shinano Railway Line and is 47.9 km (29.76 miles) from the starting point of the line at Karuizawa Station.

== Station layout ==
The station consists of two ground-level opposed side platforms serving two tracks, connected to the station building by a footbridge.

=== Platforms ===
1	■ Shinano Railway Line	for Togura, Shinonoi, and Nagano
2	■ Shinano Railway Line	for Ueda, Komoro, and Karuizawa

== Adjacent stations ==
«	Service	»
Shinano Railway Line
Nishi-Ueda	Local	Sakaki

== History ==
The station opened on 1 April 1999.

== Passenger statistics ==
In fiscal 2017, the station was used by an average of 455 passengers daily (boarding passengers only).

== Surrounding area ==
- Kanei-Nakanojo Industrial Park

== See also ==
- List of railway stations in Japan
