= Yashiro Kōkō-mae Station =

Railway station in Chikuma, Nagano Prefecture, Japan

Yashiro Kōkō-mae Station 屋代高校前駅
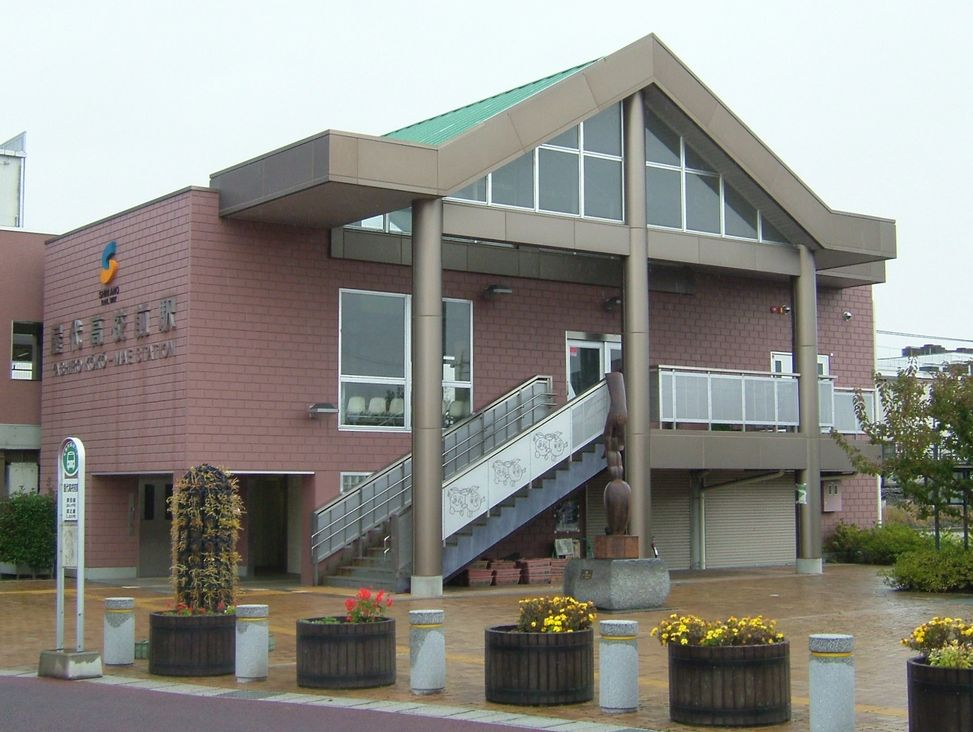
- Yashiro Kōkō-mae Station entrance, November 2007

General information
- Location: 1411-3 Yashiro, Chikuma-shi, Nagano-ken 387-0007; Japan
- Coordinates: 36.5481°N 138.1326°E
- Elevation: 357 m (1,171 ft)
- Operator: Shinano Railway
- Line: ■ Shinano Railway Line
- Distance: 61.8 km from Karuizawa
- Platforms: 2 side platforms
- Tracks: 2

Other information
- Status: Staffed
- Website: www.shinanorailway.co.jp/area/yashirokoukoumae.php

History
- Opened: 22 March 2001

Passengers
- FY2011: 1,530 daily
Location
- Location within Nagano Prefecture Location within Japan

Yashiro Kōkō-mae Station (屋代高校前駅, Yashirokōkōmae-eki; lit. "In front of Yashiro High School") is a railway station on the Shinano Railway Line in the city of Chikuma, Nagano, Japan, operated by the third-sector railway operating company Shinano Railway.

== Lines ==
Yashiro Kōkō-mae Station is served by the Shinano Railway Line and is 61.8 kilometers from the starting point of the line at Karuizawa Station.

== Station layout ==
The station consists of two opposed side platforms serving two tracks, connected to the station building by a footbridge.

=== Platforms ===
1	■ Shinano Railway Line	for Ueda, Komoro, and Karuizawa
2	■ Shinano Railway Line	for Togura, Shinonoi, and Nagano

== Adjacent stations ==
←	Service	→
Shinano Railway Line
Yashiro	Local	Shinonoi

== History ==
Yashiro Kōkō-mae Station opened on 22 March 2001.

== Passenger statistics ==
In fiscal 2011, the station was used by an average of 1,530 passengers daily.

== Surrounding area ==
- Yashiro High School
- Mori Shogunzuka Kofun
- Nagano Prefectural History Museum

== See also ==
- List of railway stations in Japan
