= Yashiro Station =

Railway station in Chikuma, Nagano Prefecture, Japan

Yashiro Station 屋代駅
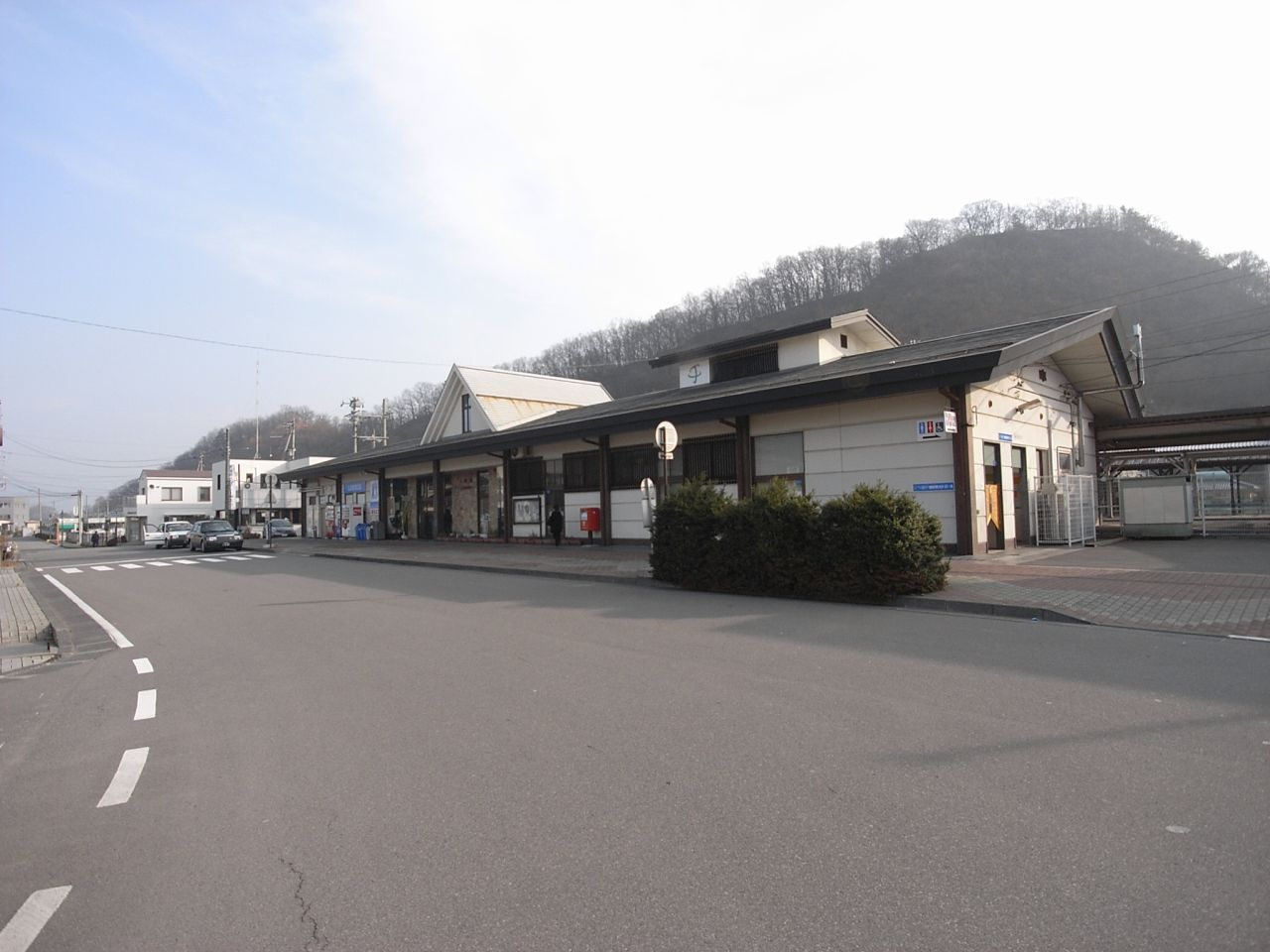
- Yashiro Station in March 2008

General information
- Location: 3139 Ojima, Chikuma-shi, Nagano-ken 387-0013; Japan
- Coordinates: 36.5330°N 138.1278°E
- Elevation: 361 m (1,184 ft)
- Operator: Shinano Railway
- Line: ■ Shinano Railway Line
- Distance: 59.9 km from Karuizawa
- Platforms: 1 side + 1 island platform
- Tracks: 3

Other information
- Status: Staffed
- Website: Official website

History
- Opened: 15 March 1888

Passengers
- FY2011: 4,464 daily
Location
- Location within Nagano Prefecture Location within Japan

Yashiro Station (屋代駅, Yashiro-eki) is a railway station on the Shinano Railway Line in the city of Chikuma, Nagano, Japan, operated by the third-sector railway operating company Shinano Railway.

== Lines ==
Yashiro Station is served by the Shinano Railway Line and is 59.9 kilometers from the starting point of the line at Karuizawa Station.

== Station layout ==
The station consists of one ground-level island platform and one side platform serving three tracks, connected to the station building by a footbridge.

=== Platforms ===
1	■ Shinano Railway Line	for Shinonoi and Nagano
2	■ Shinano Railway Line	-
3	■ Shinano Railway Line	for Ueda, Komoro, and Karuizawa

== Adjacent stations ==
←	Service	→
Shinano Railway Line
Chikuma	Local	Yashiro Kōkō-mae

== History ==
Yashiro Station opened on 15 August 1888. The Nagano Electric Railway Yashiro Line also served this station from 10 June 1922 to 31 March 2012.

== Passenger statistics ==
In fiscal 2011, the station was used by an average of 4,464 passengers daily.

== Surrounding area ==
- Chikuma City Hall
- Chikuma Post Office
- Yashiro-Minami High School

== See also ==
- List of railway stations in Japan
