= Chikuma Station =

Railway station in Chikuma, Nagano, Japan

Chikuma Station 千曲駅
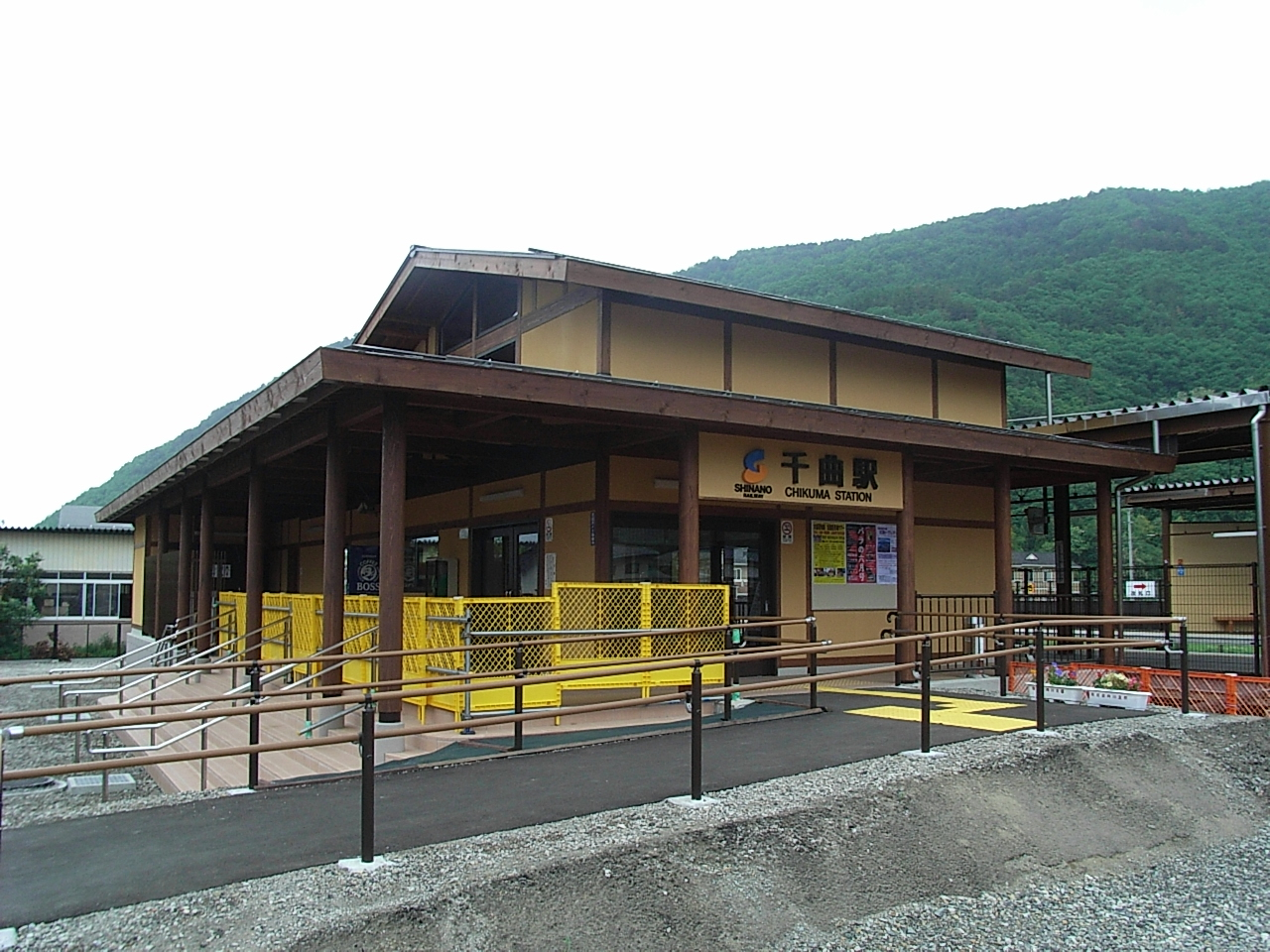
- Station building of Chikuma Station in May 2009

General information
- Location: 200 Jakumaku, Chikuma-shi, Nagano-ken 387-0016; Japan
- Coordinates: 36°30′32.81″N 138°8′29.03″E
- Elevation: 369 m (1,211 ft)
- Operator: Shinano Railway
- Line: ■ Shinano Railway Line
- Distance: 57.1 km from Karuizawa
- Platforms: 2 side platforms
- Tracks: 2

Other information
- Status: Staffed
- Website: Official website

History
- Opened: 14 March 2009

Passengers
- FY2011: 825 daily
Location
- Location within Nagano Prefecture Location within Japan

Chikuma Station (千曲駅, Chikuma-eki) is a railway station on the Shinano Railway Line in the city of Chikuma, Nagano, Japan, operated by the third-sector railway operating company Shinano Railway.

== Lines ==
Chikuma Station is served by the Shinano Railway Line and is 57.1 kilometers from the starting point of the line at Karuizawa Station.

== Station layout ==
The station consists of two opposed ground-level side platforms serving two tracks, connected to the station building by a footbridge.

=== Platforms ===
1	■ Shinano Railway Line	for Shinonoi and Nagano
2	■ Shinano Railway Line	for Ueda, Komoro, and Karuizawa

== Adjacent stations ==
←	Service	→
Shinano Railway Line
Rapid: Does not stop at this station
Togura	Local	Yashiro

== History ==
Chikuma Station opened on 14 March 2009.

== Passenger statistics ==
In fiscal 2011, the station was used by an average of 825 passengers daily.

== Surrounding area ==
- Goka Post Office
- Goka Elementary School

== See also ==
- List of railway stations in Japan
