= Ōya Station =

Ōya Station is the name of two railway stations in Japan:

- Ōya Station (Nagano) (大屋駅)
- Ōya Station (Gifu) (大矢駅)
