= Shigeno Station =

Railway station in Tōmi, Nagano Prefecture, Japan

Shigeno Station 滋野駅
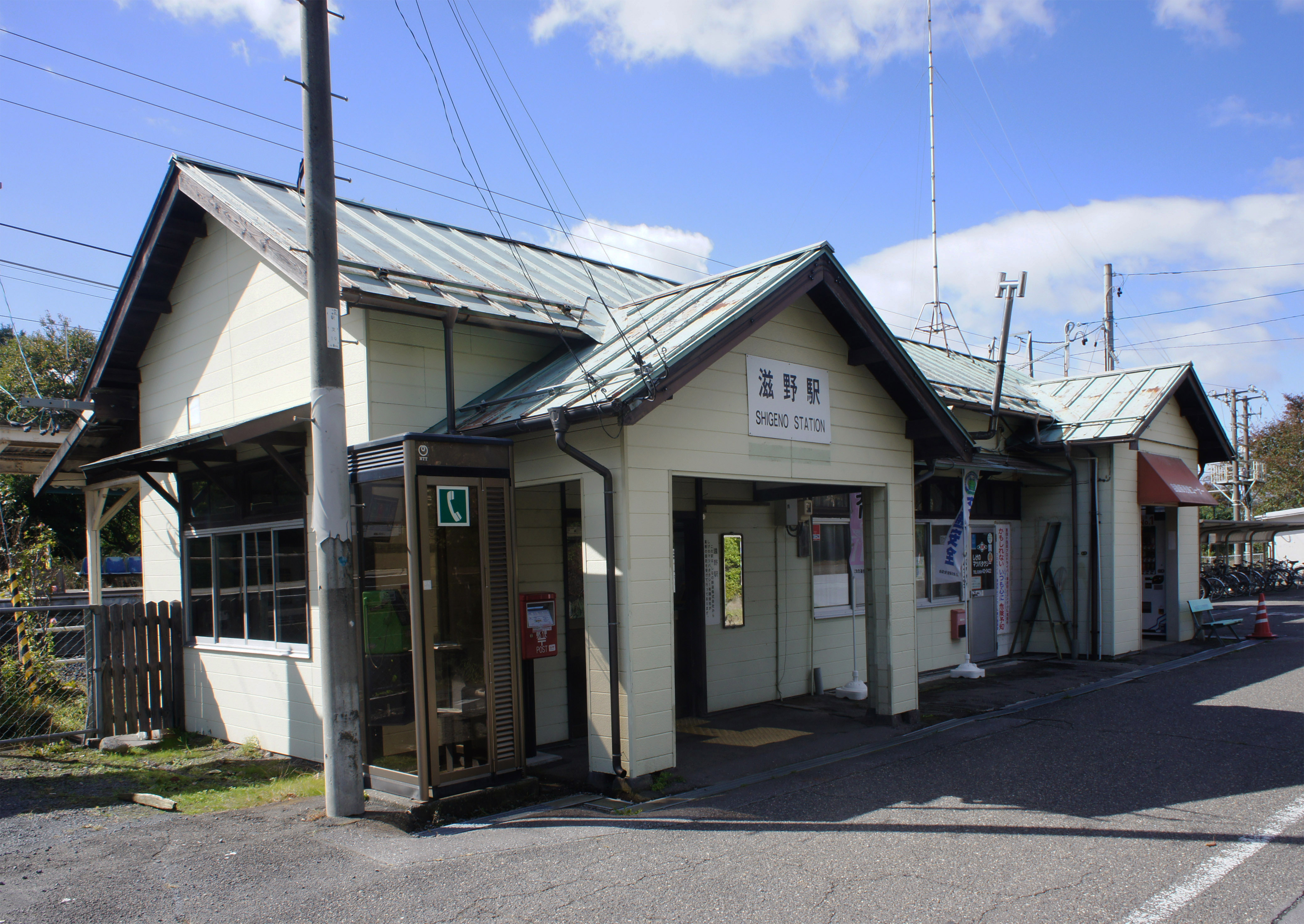
- Shigeno Station in October 2021

General information
- Location: 977 Shigeno-Otsu, Tōmi-shi, Nagano-ken 389-0512; Japan
- Coordinates: 36.3425°N 138.3635°E
- Elevation: 563 m (1,847 ft)
- Operator: Shinano Railway
- Line: ■ Shinano Railway Line
- Distance: 27.9 km from Karuizawa
- Platforms: 1 island platform
- Tracks: 2

Other information
- Status: Staffed
- Website: Official website

History
- Opened: 1 October 1923

Passengers
- FY2011: 769 daily
Location
- Location within Nagano Prefecture Location within Japan

Shigeno Station (滋野駅, Shigeno-eki) is a railway station on the Shinano Railway Line in the city of Tōmi, Nagano, Japan, operated by the third-sector railway operating company Shinano Railway.

== Lines ==
Shigeno Station is served by the 65.1 km Shinano Railway Line and is 27.9 kilometers from the starting point of the line at Karuizawa Station.

== Station layout ==
The station consists of one ground-level island platform serving two tracks. The station is staffed.

=== Platforms ===
1	■ Shinano Railway Line	for Komoro and Karuizawa
2	■ Shinano Railway Line	for Ueda, Shinonoi, and Nagano

== Adjacent stations ==
«	Service	»
Shinano Railway Line
Komoro	Local	Tanaka

== History ==
The station opened on 1 October 1923.

== Passenger statistics ==
In fiscal 2011, the station was used by an average of 769 passengers daily.

== Surrounding area ==
- Shigeno Post Office
- Chikuma River

== See also ==
- List of railway stations in Japan
