= Sakaki, Nagano =

Sakaki 坂城町
- Town
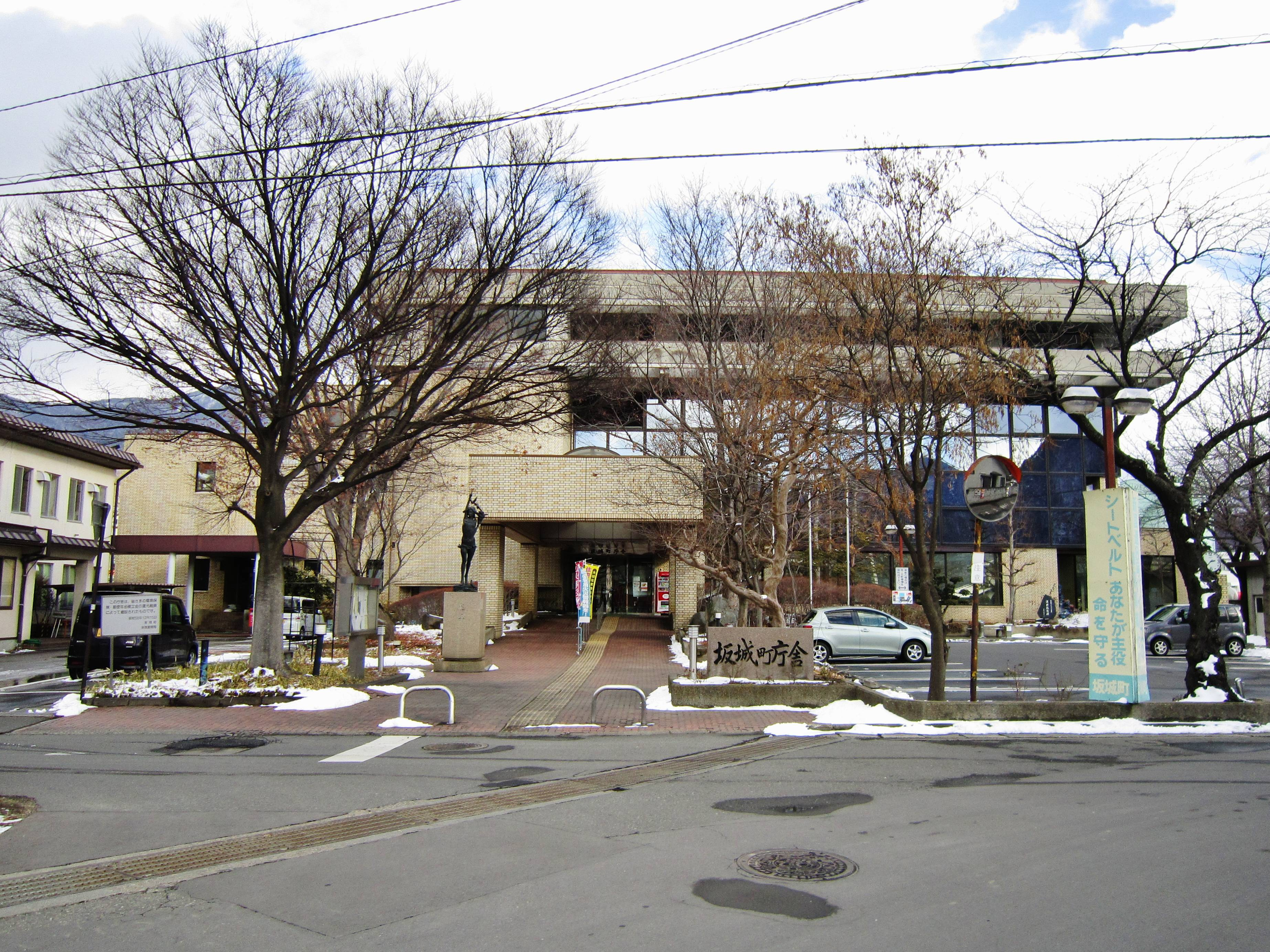
- Sakaki Town Hall

- Flag Seal

- Location of Sakaki in Nagano Prefecture

- Coordinates: 36°27′42.5″N 138°10′48.4″E
- Country: Japan
- Region: Chūbu (Kōshin'etsu)
- Prefecture: Nagano
- District: Hanishina

Area
  - Total: 53.64 km^{2} (20.71 sq mi)

Population (April 2019)
  - Total: 15,025
  - Density: 280.1/km^{2} (725.5/sq mi)
- Time zone: UTC+9 (Japan Standard Time)
- Symbols
  - Tree: Celtis sinensis
  - Flower: Rose
  - Flowering Tree: Apple
- Phone number: 0268-82-3111
- Address: 10050 Sakaki, Sakaki-machi, Hanishina-gun, Nagano-ken 389-0692
- Website: Official website

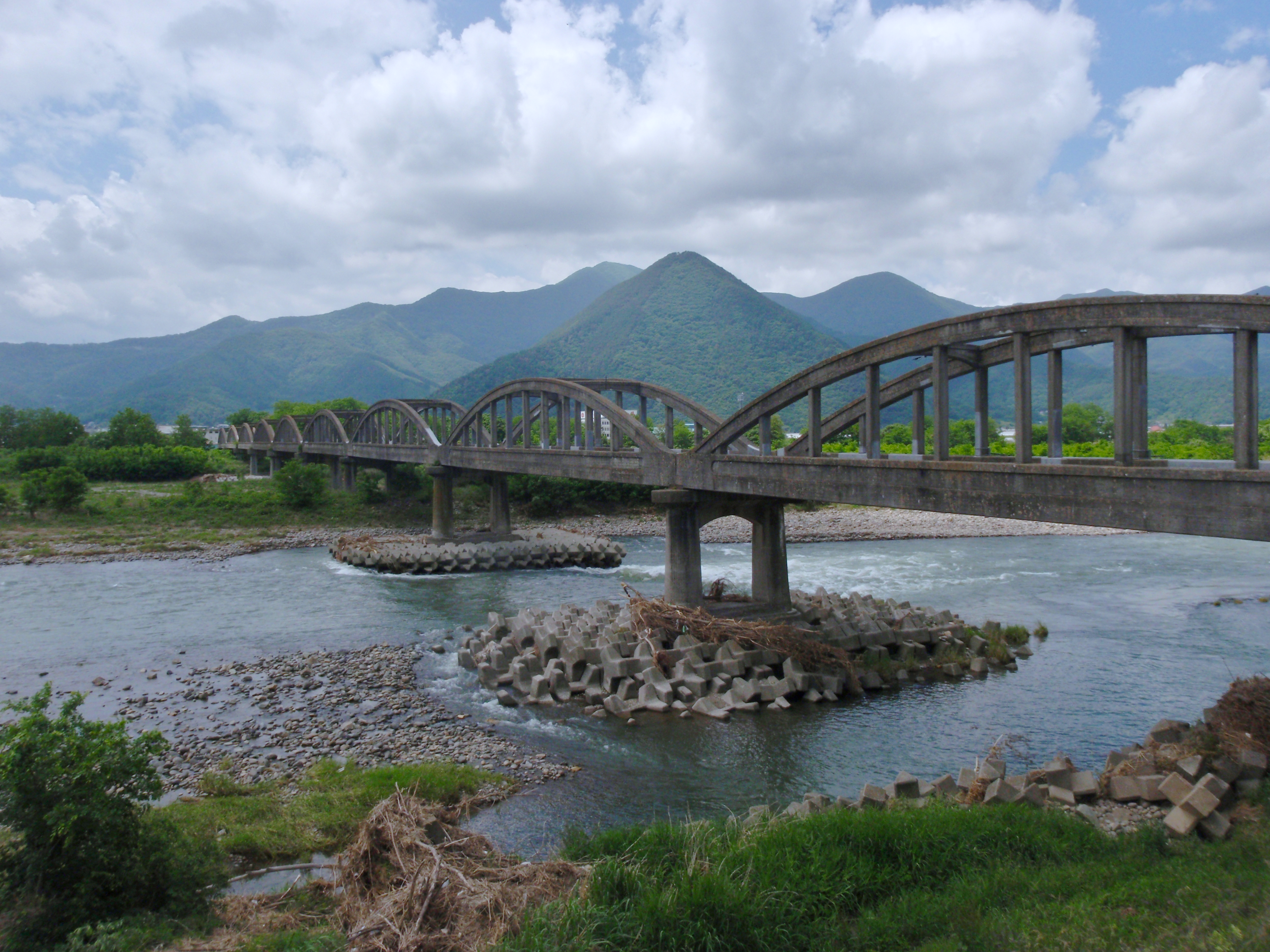
Showa Bridge over the Chikuma River in Sakaki

Sakaki (坂城町, Sakaki-machi) is a town located in Nagano Prefecture, Japan. As of 1 April 2019, the town had an estimated population of 15,025 in 6211 households, and a population density of 280 persons per km^{2}. The total area of the town is 53.64 square kilometres (20.71 sq mi).

== Geography ==
Sakaki is located in the Toushin Region, or north-central region, of Nagano Prefecture. The Chikuma River flows through the town.

=== Surrounding municipalities ===
- Nagano Prefecture
  - Chikuma
  - Ueda

=== Climate ===
The town has a climate characterized by characterized by hot and humid summers, and cold winters (Köppen climate classification Cfa. The average annual temperature in Sakaki is 12.4 °C. The average annual rainfall is 1086 mm with September as the wettest month. The temperatures are highest on average in August, at around 25.9 °C, and lowest in January, at around -0.3 °C.

== Demographics ==
Per Japanese census data, the population of Sakaki has remained relatively constant over the past 70 years.

Historical population
Year	Pop.	±%
1940	12,107	—
1950	15,851	+30.9%
1960	14,430	−9.0%
1970	15,721	+8.9%
1980	16,685	+6.1%
1990	16,632	−0.3%
2000	16,830	+1.2%
2010	15,734	−6.5%
2020	14,004	−11.0%

== History ==
The area of present-day Sakaki was part of ancient Shinano Province. The area was part of the holdings of the short-lived Sakaki Domain (1683–1702) during the early Edo period, and was thereafter tenryō territory controlled directly by the Tokugawa shogunate via the Naka-no-jō daikanshō until the Meiji restoration. The modern village of Sakaki was established on April 1, 1889 by the establishment of the municipalities system and was elevated to town status on July 12, 1904. The town annexed the neighboring villages of Nakanojō and Nanjō on April 1, 1955, and the village of Murakami from neighboring Sarashina District on April 1, 1960.

== Economy ==
Takeuchi Manufacturing, a construction equipment manufacturer, has its headquarters in the city. Agricultural products include rice, horticulture (apples, pears and grapes) and cut flowers.

== Education ==
Sakaki has three public elementary schools and one public middle school operated by the town government, and one high school operated the Nagano Prefectural Board of Education.

== Notable places ==
- Katsurao Castle - A castle ruin, home castle of the Murakami clan.

== Transportation ==
=== Railway ===
- Shinano Railway - Shinano Railway Line
  - Tekuno-Sakaki - Sakaki

=== Highway ===
- Jōshin-etsu Expressway
- National Route 18
