= Shinano Kokubun-ji =

Buddhist temple in Ueda, Nagano Prefecture, Japan

- 信濃国分寺
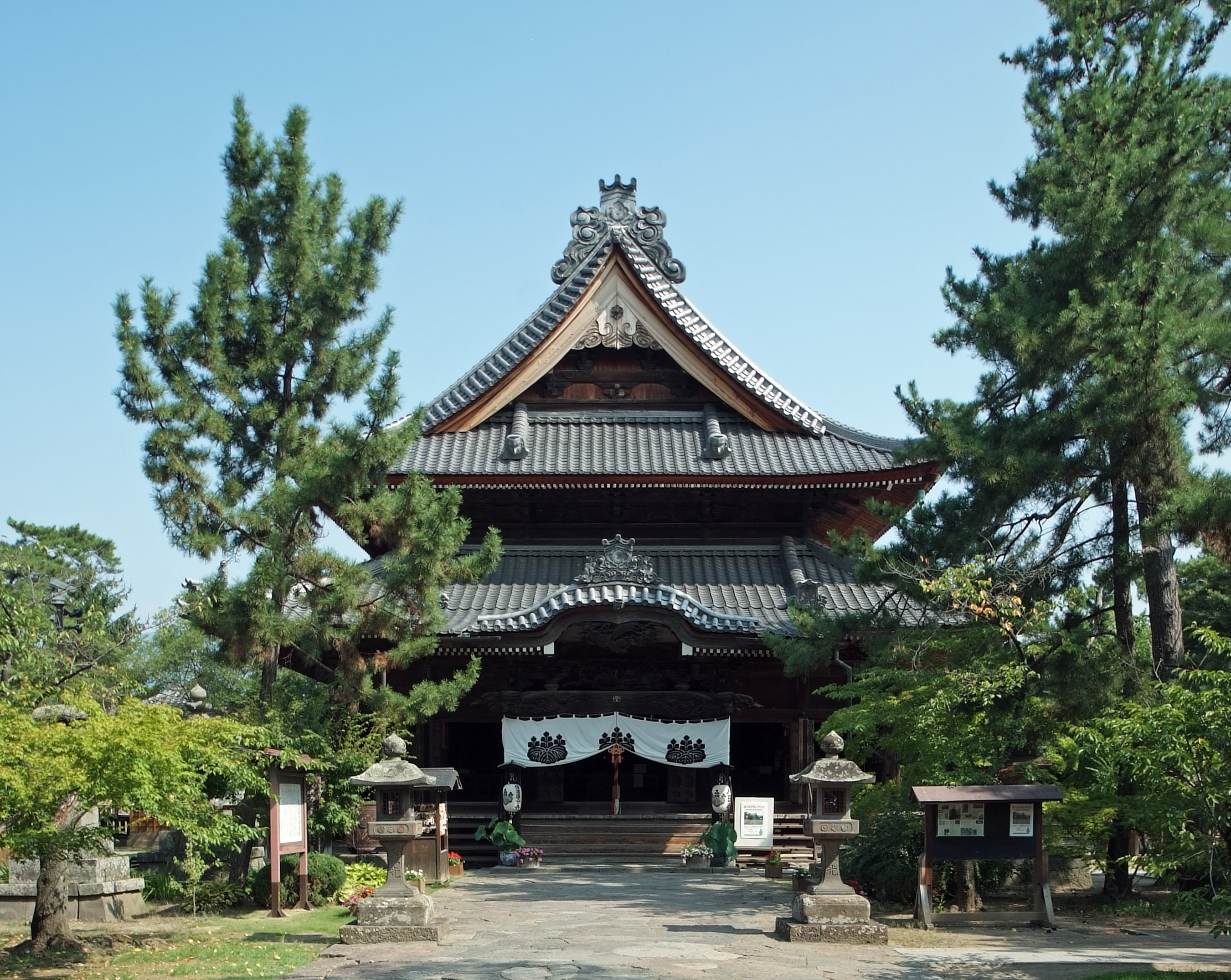
- Shinano Kokubun-ji Main Hall

- Location within Nagano Prefecture Location within Japan

Religion
- Affiliation: Buddhist
- Deity: Yakushi Nyōrai
- Rite: Tendai

Location
- Location: Kokubun 1049, Ueda-shi, Nagano-ken
- Country: Japan
- Coordinates: 36°22′50″N 138°16′14″E

Architecture
- Founder: Emperor Shōmu

Website
- Official website
- National Important Cultural Property National Historic Site of Japan

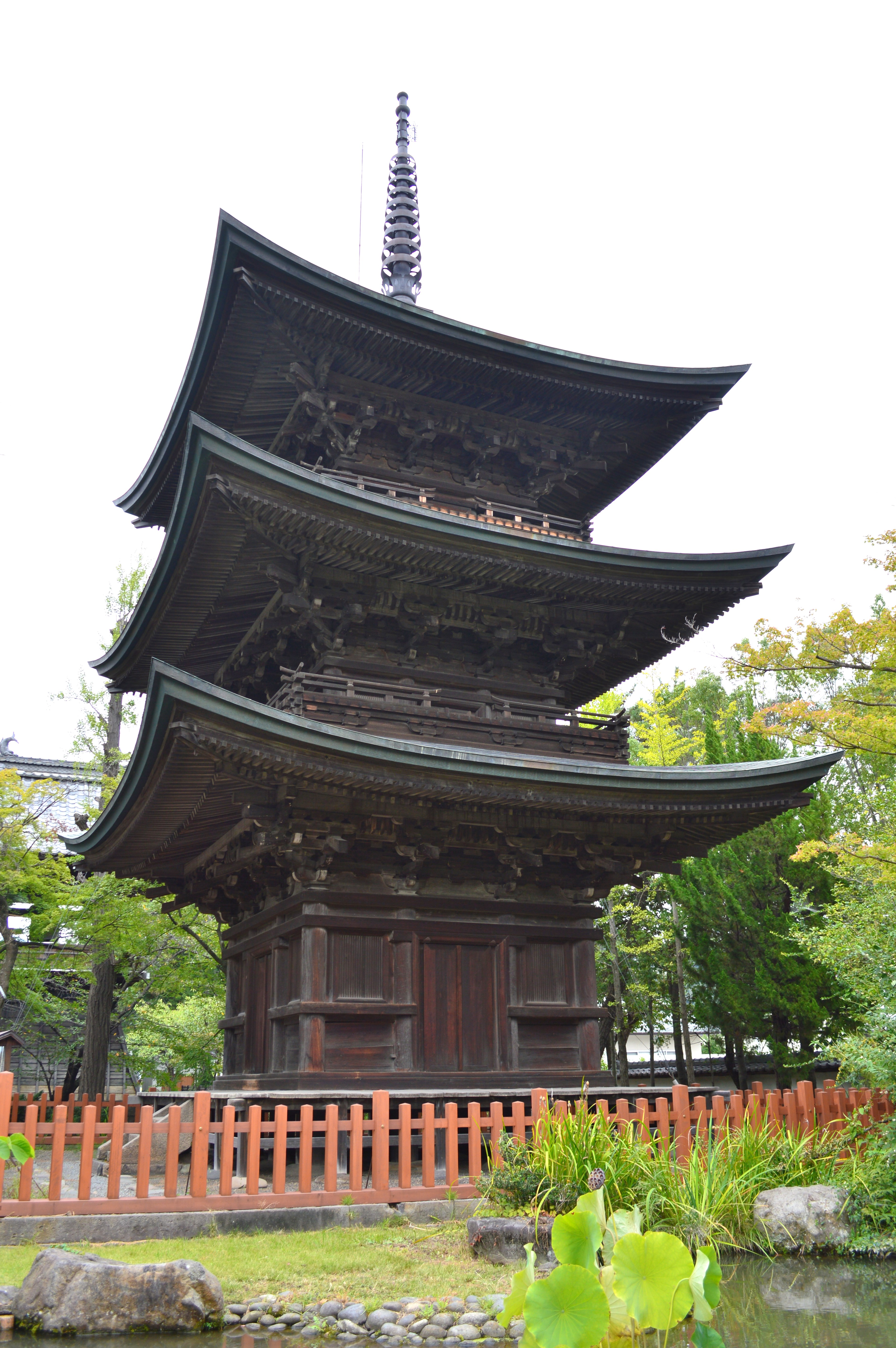
Three-story Pagoda at Shinano Kokubun-ji (ICP)

The Shinano Kokubun-ji (信濃国分寺) is a Buddhist temple located in the city of Ueda, Nagano, Japan. It belongs to the Tendai sect, and its honzon is a statue of Yakushi Nyōrai. It is the successor to the Nara period kokubunji National Temples established by Emperor Shōmu for the purpose of promoting Buddhism as the national religion of Japan and standardising control of the imperial rule to the provinces. The archaeological site with the ruins of the ancient temple grounds for the provincial temple and its associated provincial nunnery was collectively designated as a National Historic Site in 1974.

Amulets of Somin Shōrai a deity of the Gion faith are distributed from here.

== History ==
The Shoku Nihongi records that in 741, as the country recovered from a major smallpox epidemic, Emperor Shōmu ordered that a monastery and nunnery be established in every province, the kokubunji (国分寺).

The Shinano Kokubun-ji is located in the Ueda Basin on the north bank of the Chikuma River, with the ruins of the ancient Shinano Kokubun-ji located 300 meters to the south of the current temple. It is believed that the ancient provincial capital of Shinano Province was located nearby; however, archaeological excavations indicate that the Kokubun-ji ruins are not the original Nara-period provincial temple, but are an early Heian period reconstruction. The exact date of this Heian period foundation is uncertain, and traces of a fire lend some credence to temple legend that it was burned down in a battle between the armies of the central government and the forces of the rebel Taira no Masakado in 938 AD. Many other provincial temples around the country were destroyed during this period, due to a decline in the authority of the central government and rise of competing local warlords at the end of the Heian period. The stone pagoda in the current temple grounds is thought to date back to the Kamakura period (Ueda City Tangible Cultural Property), and temple legend has it that the 20.1-meter three-story pagoda was built in 1197 (by Minamoto no Yoritomo; although the style suggests that it was built in the mid-Muromachi period), so the relocation is believed to have occurred around the end of the Heian period.

The ruins of the ancient Shinano Kokubun-ji are a square enclosure measuring 176.56 meters east-to-west by 178.05 meters north-to-south. Within this enclosure, the foundation stones for a Kondō, Lecture Hall, Great South Gate, Middle Gate and Pagoda, with a surrounding Cloister and priest's residence have been preserved. The layout mirrors that of the Tōdai-ji in Nara, the head temple of the kokubunji system, with the main buildings lined up in a single file from south-to-north, with the cloister connecting the Middle Gate and the Lecture Hall, and the pagoda located to the southeast of the Kondō.

These ruins were adjacent to the Kokubun-niiji, or Provincial nunnery, whose layout was almost identical, but on a slightly smaller scale, with the enclosure measuring 148 meters square. The two sites today are separated by a railroad line, but both are preserved as part of an archaeological park. Two kiln ruins have been discovered some 200 meters northeast of these ruins, where the roof tiles used for both of these temple were made.

In 1980, the Shinano Kokubun-ji Museum (信濃国分寺資料館, Shinano kokubunji shiryōkan) was built at the site of the temple ruins, and displays the excavated roof tiles, circular ink-stones, ceramics, earthenware, and other artifacts. It is located about a five-minute walk from Shinano-Kokubunji Station on the Shinano Railway.

== Current situation ==
The origins of the modern successor to the Shinano Kokubun-ji are not certain. Per the Azuma Kagami, Minamoto no Yoritomo made a pilgrimage to Zenko-ji in Nagano and made a vow to rebuild the pagoda of the Shinano Kokubun-ji. A three-story pagoda was not actually completed until 1480, in the Muromachi period, but from a stone monument and some Kamakura period artifacts found in the temple precincts, it appears that reconstruction began in the Kamakura period at a site 300 meters to the north of the Heian period temple.

The three-story pagoda was destroyed by lightning around 1585, which was the year that the local warlord Sanada Masayuki defeated the Tokugawa clan at the Battle of Ueda. In 1600, during the Siege of Ueda, Sanada Masayuki met with Tokugawa Hidetada at the Shinano Kokubun-ji for negotiations on possible capitulation as part of his delaying strategy to prevent Tokugawa Hidetada's forces from arriving on the field of battle in time for the Battle of Sekigahara.

In the Edo Period, the temple was revived with the assistance of the various daimyō of Ueda Domain under the Tokugawa shogunate and a number of buildings were repaired or reconstructed, including the three-story pagoda. It houses a statue of Dainichi Nyōrai and the structure is designed as a National Important Cultural Property. Seasonal fairs held at the temple helped maintain its revenues. The present main hall, a Yakushi-dō was completed in 1860. It has two sets of eaves, giving it the outward appearance of a two-story structure, but the building interior has only single story. It is designed as a Nagano Prefecture Important Cultural Property.

== Gallery ==
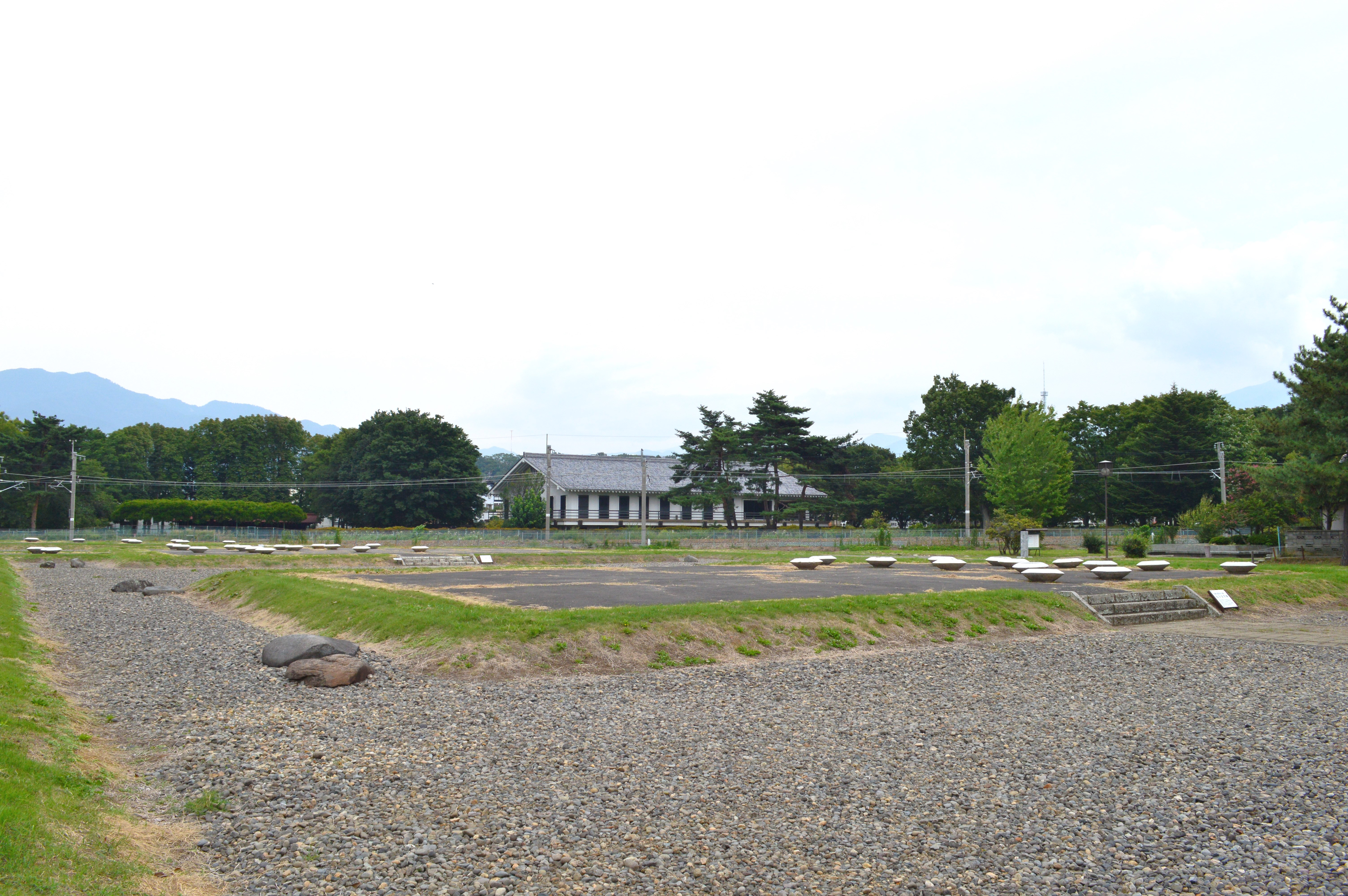
Site of the Shinano Kokubun-niji

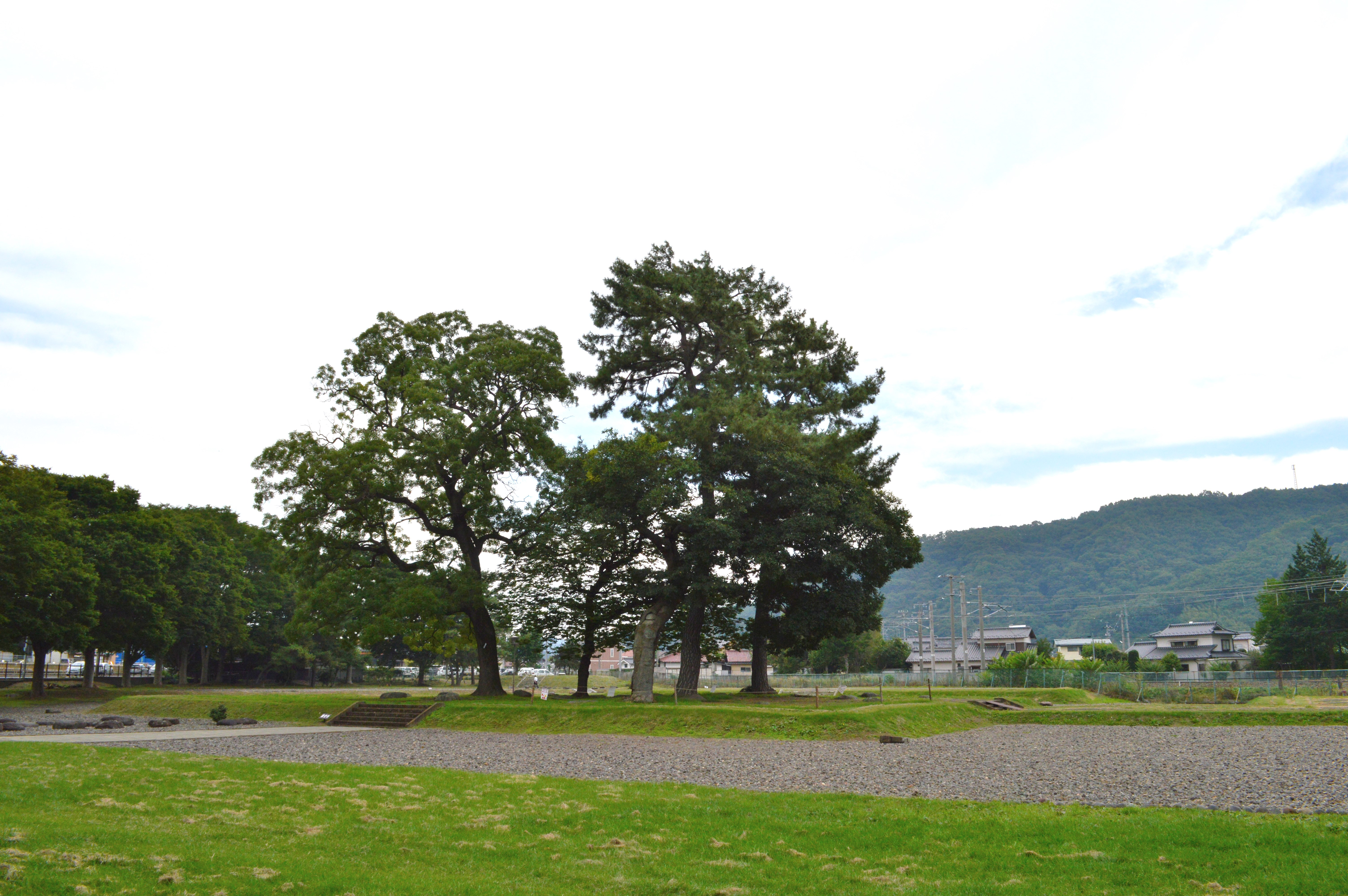
Site of the Shinano Kokubun-ji

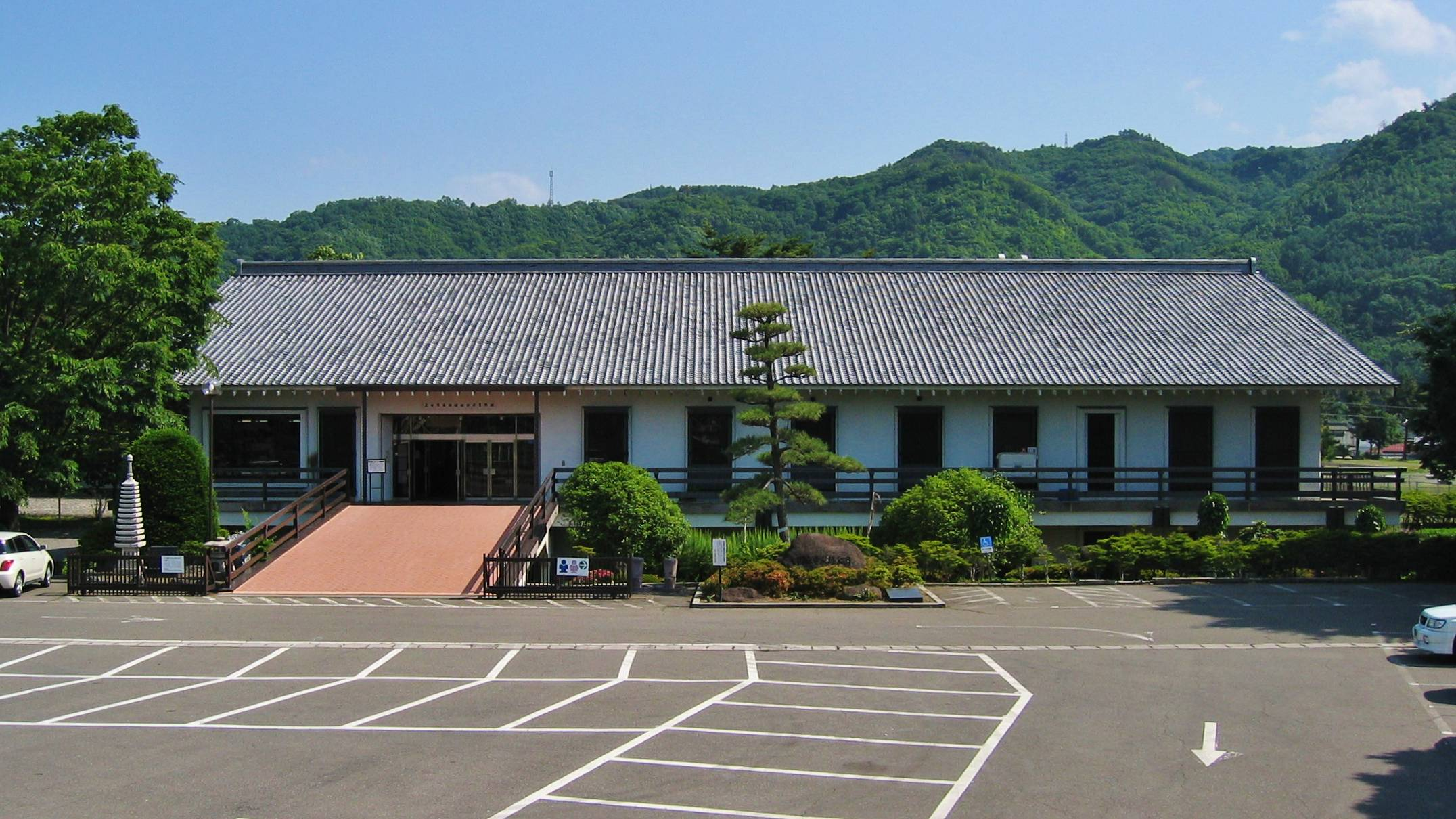
Shinano Kokubunji museum

== Cultural Properties ==
=== National Important Cultural Properties ===
- Three-story pagoda (三重塔), mid-Muromachi period (1393-1466)

== See also ==
- List of Historic Sites of Japan (Nagano)
- provincial temple
