= Shinano Railway Line =

Railway line in Nagano prefecture, Japan

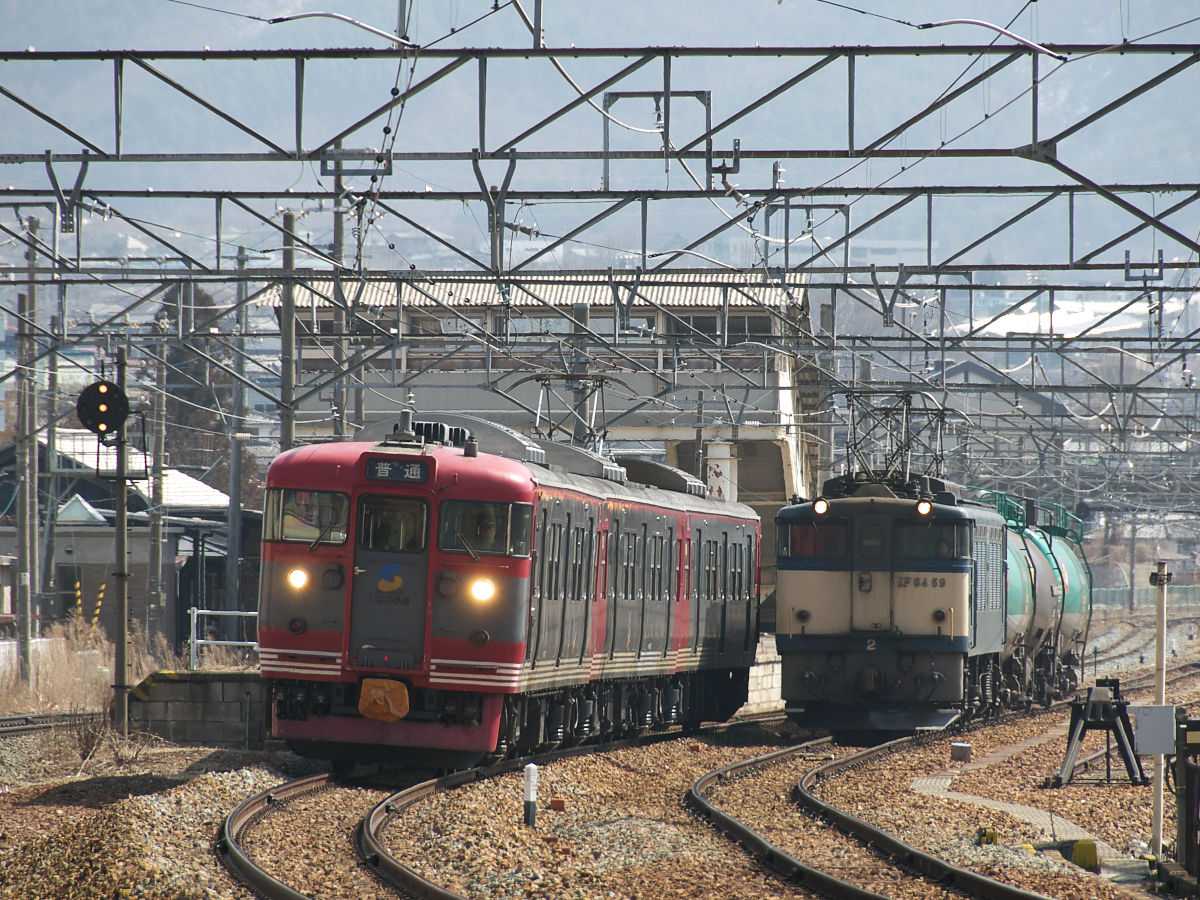
- A 115 series train at Sakaki Station, March 2008

Overview
- Native name: しなの鉄道線
- Owner: Shinano Railway
- Locale: Nagano Prefecture
- Termini: Karuizawa; Shinonoi
- Stations: 19

Service
- Type: Commuter rail
- Rolling stock: 115 series, SR1 series

History
- Opened: 1 October 1997

Technical
- Line length: 65.1 km (40.5 mi)
- Number of tracks: 2
- Track gauge: 1,067 mm (3 ft 6 in)
- Minimum radius: 400 m (1,300 ft)
- Electrification: 1,500 V DC, overhead catenary
- Operating speed: 100 km/h (60 mph)
Route map

The Shinano Railway Line (しなの鉄道線, Shinano Tetsudō-sen) is a 65.1 km (40.5 mi) railway line operated by the third-sector railway operating company Shinano Railway in Nagano Prefecture, Japan. It connects Karuizawa Station in Karuizawa with Shinonoi Station in Nagano.

== Overview ==
Before October 1997, the right-of-way now belonging to the Shinano Railway was a part of the Shinetsu Main Line of East Japan Railway Company (JR East), and served as the main train route connecting Nagano and Tokyo. Upon completion of the Nagano Shinkansen in October 1997, JR East transferred all long distance operations to the shinkansen, and control of the Shinetsu Main Line between Karuizawa and Shinonoi was handed over to the newly formed Shinano Railway, which is majority owned by the Nagano Prefectural Government. Today, the line is a vital commuter transport route for communities in the east and north of Nagano Prefecture.

The line is electrified and double-tracked with a track gauge of 1,067 mm (3 ft 6 in) for its entire length. The speed limit is 100 km/h (62 mph) (reduced from 120 km/h (75 mph) as the Shinetsu Main Line).

Like many railways in rural parts of Japan, the line faces problems concerning decreased ridership and revenue. In recent years, additional stations have been opened at Tekuno-Sakaki, Yashiro-kōkō-mae, and Shinano-Kokubunji in order to increase passenger numbers. Also, driver-only operation has been introduced on most of the line in order to reduce personnel costs.

== Operations ==
Shinano Railway Line trains use the right-of-way of the Shinetsu Main Line between Shinonoi and Nagano. All trains terminate at Nagano, not Shinonoi.

As of April 2008, four round trains are operated as Rapids from Nagano. One in the morning from Komoro to Nagano, and two in the evening from Nagano to Ueda are named Shinano Sunrise and Shinano Sunset, require payment of surcharge between Nagano and Ueda.

== Stations ==
All stations are in Nagano Prefecture.

Station	Japanese	Rapid	Rapid Resort Rokumon	Rapid Karuizawa Resort	Rapid Shinano Sunrise	Rapid Shina Sunset	Connections	Location
Karuizawa	軽井沢	●	●	●			Hokuriku Shinkansen	Karuizawa
Naka-Karuizawa	中軽井沢	●	●	▲				Karuizawa
Shinano-Oiwake	信濃追分	●	●	｜				Karuizawa
Miyota	御代田	●	｜	▲				Miyota
Hirahara	平原	｜	｜	｜				Komoro
Komoro	小諸	●	●	▲	●		■ Koumi Line	Komoro
Shigeno	滋野	｜	｜	｜	↓			Tōmi
Tanaka	田中	●	●	▲	↓			Tōmi
Ōya	大屋	●	｜	｜	↓			Ueda
Shinano-Kokubunji	信濃国分寺	｜	｜	｜	↓			Ueda
Ueda	上田	●	●	●	●	●	Hokuriku Shinkansen; Ueda Electric Railway Bessho Line	Ueda
Nishi-Ueda	西上田	｜	｜	｜	↓	｜		Ueda
Tekuno-Sakaki	テクノさかき	｜	｜	｜	↓	｜		Sakaki
Sakaki	坂城	▲	｜	▲	↓	｜		Sakaki
Togura	戸倉	●	●	▲	↓	｜		Chikuma
Chikuma	千曲	｜	｜	｜	↓	｜		Chikuma
Yashiro	屋代	●	●	▲	↓	｜		Chikuma
Yashiro-kōkō-mae	屋代高校前	｜	｜	｜	↓	｜		Chikuma
Shinonoi	篠ノ井	●	｜	｜	↓	｜	Shinonoi Line Shin'etsu Main Line	Nagano
Shinetsu Main Line (Shinonoi – Nagano)
Imai	今井	｜	｜	｜	↓	｜		Nagano
Kawanakajima	川中島	●	｜	｜	↓	｜		Nagano
Amori	安茂里	｜	｜	｜	↓	｜		Nagano
Nagano	長野	●	●	●	●	●	Hokuriku Shinkansen; Shinano Railway Kita-Shinano Line; Nagano Electric Railway Nagano Line	Nagano

== Rolling stock ==
- 115 series 3-car EMU sets
- SR1 series (Debut on 4 July 2020)
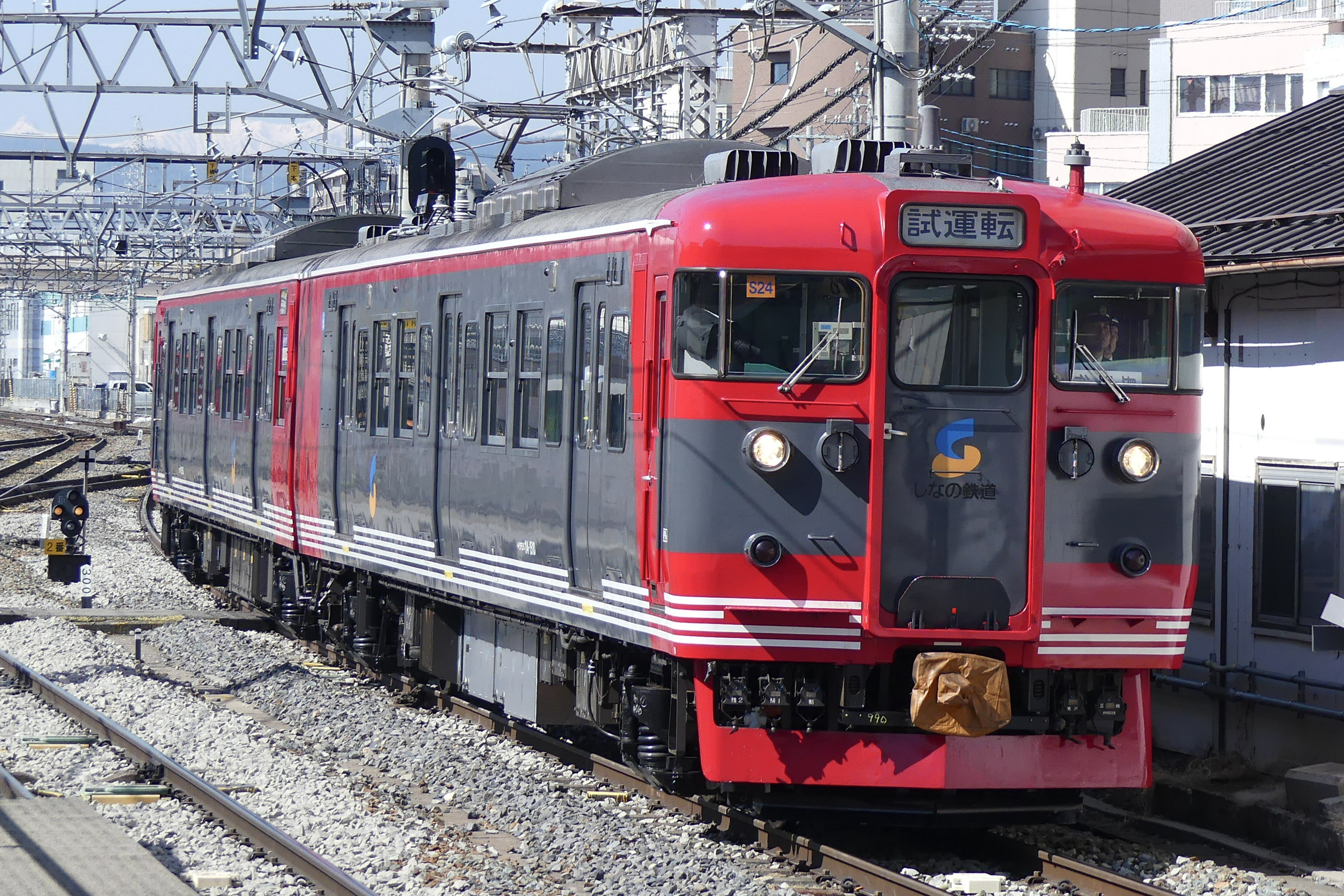
A Shinano Railway 115 series EMU in March 2018

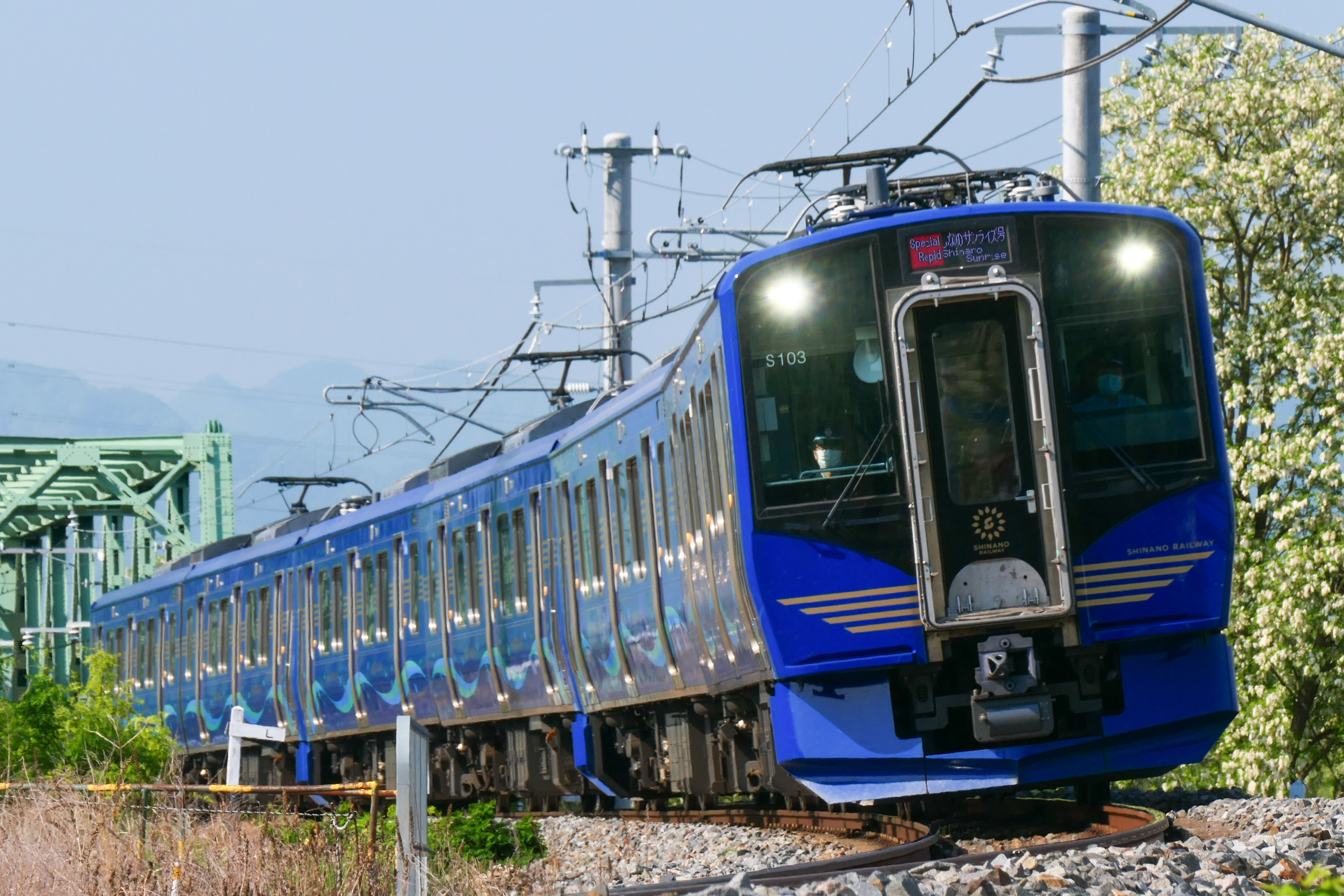
A Shinano Railway SR1 series EMU in May 2022

=== Former Rolling stock ===
- 169 series 3-car EMU sets (until April 2013)
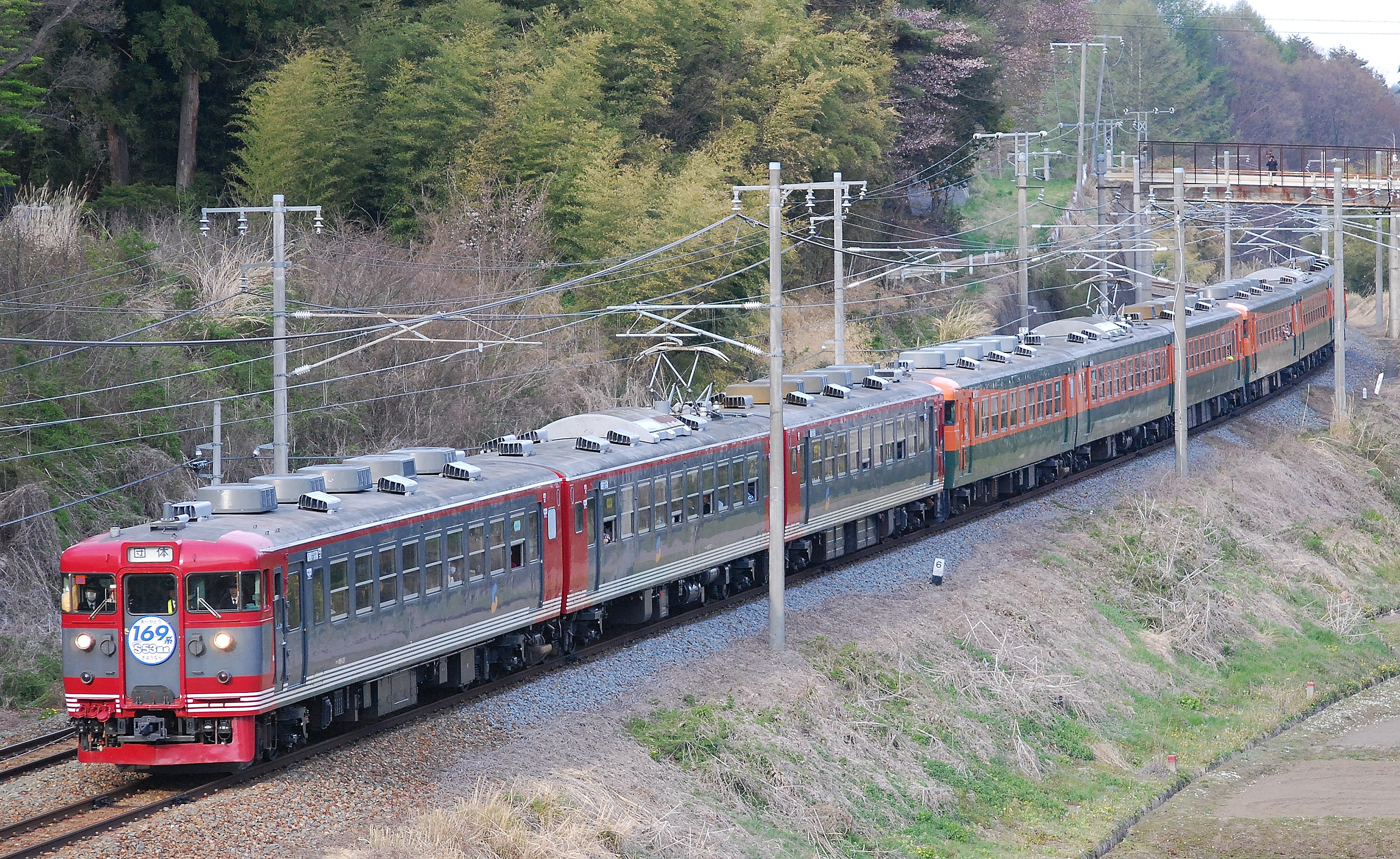
A Shinano Railway 169 series EMU in April 2013

Shinano Railway uses trainsets that were inherited from JR East when the line was transferred. The trains were subsequently repainted into Shinano Railway's livery and refurbished. Many of the trains have video screens above the doors which feature commercials and other information. In general, the 115 series trains are used for local services, while the 169 series were used for rapid and liner trains.

== History ==
The line first opened on 15 August 1888 as the 1,067 mm (3 ft 6 in) gauge steam-operated Naoetsu Line (直江津線) between Nagano and Ueda. This was extended south from Ueda to Karuizawa in December 1888. The line was electrified using a 1,500 V DC overhead wire system from June 1963.

The third-sector operator Shinano Railway was established on 1 May 1996, and operations of the Shinetsu Line between Karuizawa and Shinanoi were transferred from JR East to the Shinano Railway from 1 October 1997.

Driver only operation was introduced on some services from 5 January 2004.

=== Former connecting lines ===
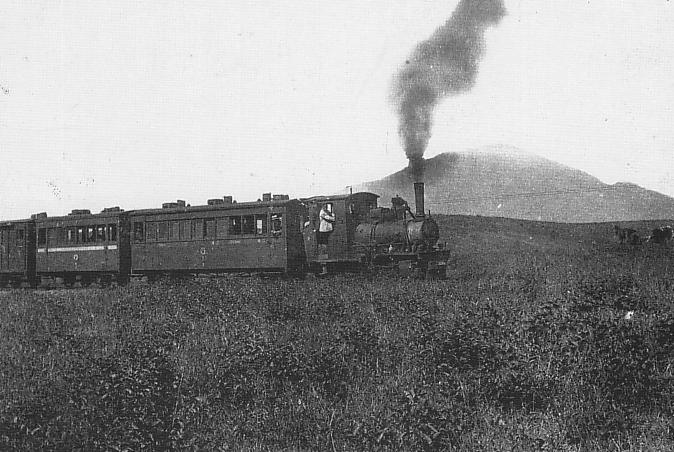
A train on the Kusakaru Electric Railway

(Note - Prior to 1997, the stations below were part of the Shinetsu Main Line.)

- Karuizawa Station: The Kusakaru Electric Railway opened a 56 km 762 mm (2 ft 6 in) gauge line, including two switch backs, to Kusatsu Onsen between 1915 and 1926. The line was electrified at 600 V DC in 1924. In 1950, a typhoon resulted in a bridge being swept away, and the same thing occurred in 1959, resulting in the 38 km section from Karuizawa to Joshu Mihara closing in 1960. The rest of the line closed in 1962.
- Komoro Station - The Nunobiki Electric Railway opened an 8 km line, electrified at 600 V DC, to Shimagawara in 1926 to transport construction materials for the Makato Azuma hydro-electric power station. When that traffic finished the revenue for the line was less than 50% of interest bill alone, and it closed in 1934.
- Oya Station: The Maruko Railway opened a 7 km line to Maruko in 1918, and electrified the line at 600 V DC in 1924. The following year, it opened a 5 km electrified line from Oya to Ueda-Higashi. In 1944, the company merged with the Ueda Onsen Electric Railway (see next entry) creating the Maruko Ueda Electric Railway. Both lines closed in 1969.
- Ueda Station: The Ueda Onsen Electric Railway opened a 13 km line to Sanada, and a 3 km branch from Motohara to Sochi between 1927 and 1928, both lines electrified at 1,500 V DC. In 1944, the company merged with the Maruko Electric Railway (see previous entry) creating the Maruko Ueda Electric Railway. Both lines closed in 1972.
- Yashiro Station: The Kato Railway opened a 24 km line to Suzaka on the Nagano Electric Railway line in 1922, electrified it at 1,500 V DC in January 1926, and merged with that company in September the same year. CTC signalling was commissioned on the line in 1983, but due to falling patronage the line closed in 2012.

== See also ==
- List of railway companies in Japan
- List of railway lines in Japan
