= Ōya Station (Nagano) =

Railway station in Ueda, Nagano Prefecture, Japan

Ōya Station 大屋駅
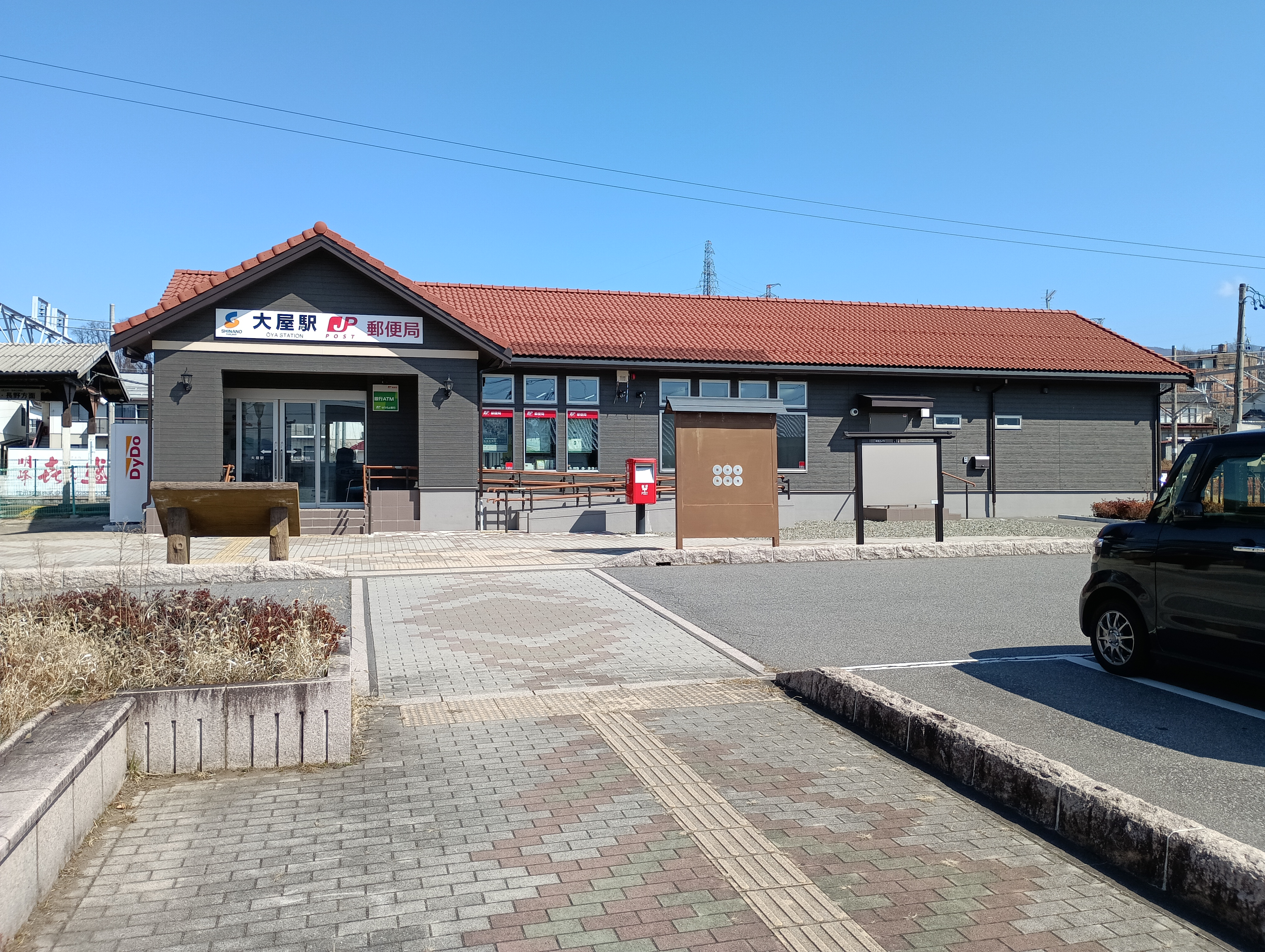
- Ōya Station in March 2026

General information
- Location: 454 Ōya, Ueda-shi, Nagano-ken 386-0152; Japan
- Coordinates: 36.3697°N 138.2973°E
- Elevation: 482 m (1,581 ft)
- Operator: Shinano Railway
- Line: ■ Shinano Railway Line
- Distance: 34.7 km from Karuizawa
- Platforms: 2 side platforms
- Tracks: 2

Other information
- Website: Official website

History
- Opened: 20 January 1896

Passengers
- FY2011: 2,320 daily
Location
- Location within Nagano Prefecture Location within Japan

Ōya Station (大屋駅, Ōya-eki) is a railway station on the Shinano Railway Line in the city of Ueda, Nagano, Japan, operated by the third-sector railway operating company Shinano Railway. On February 26, 2024, the Post office was relocated inside the station building, and Postal workers were entrusted with station duties such as ticket sales.

== Lines ==
Ōya Station is served by the 65.1 km Shinano Railway Line and is 34.7 kilometers from the starting point of the line at Karuizawa Station.

== Station layout ==
The station consists of two ground-level opposed side platforms serving two tracks.

=== Platforms ===
1	■ Shinano Railway Line	for Ueda, Shinonoi, and Nagano
2	■ Shinano Railway Line	for Komoro and Karuizawa

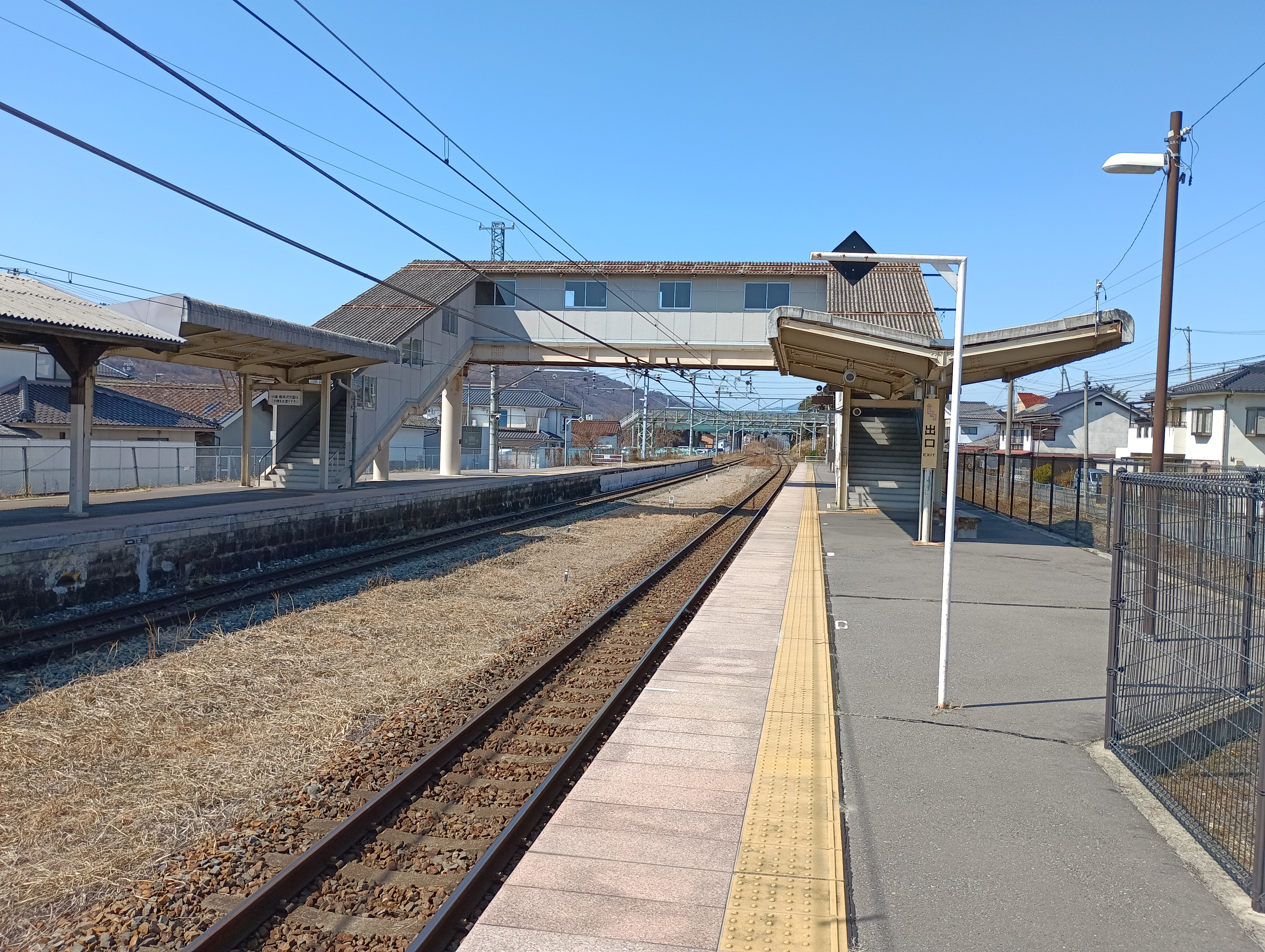
Platforms and overpasses

== Adjacent stations ==
«	Service	»
Shinano Railway Line
Tanaka	Local	Shinano-Kokubunji

== History ==
The station opened on 20 January 1896. The Ueda Maruko Electric Railway also served the station from 1918 to 1969.

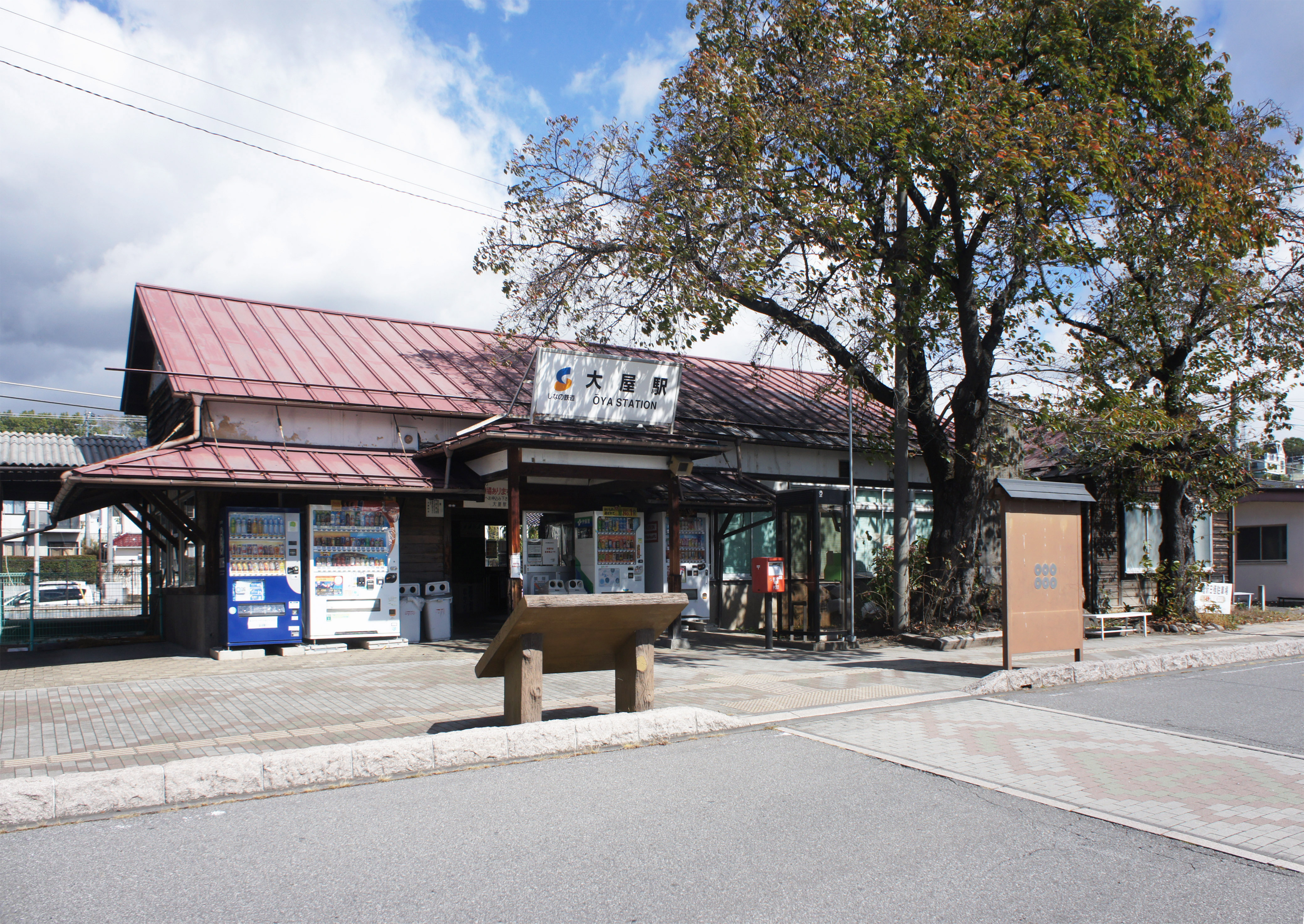
Old station building before 2024

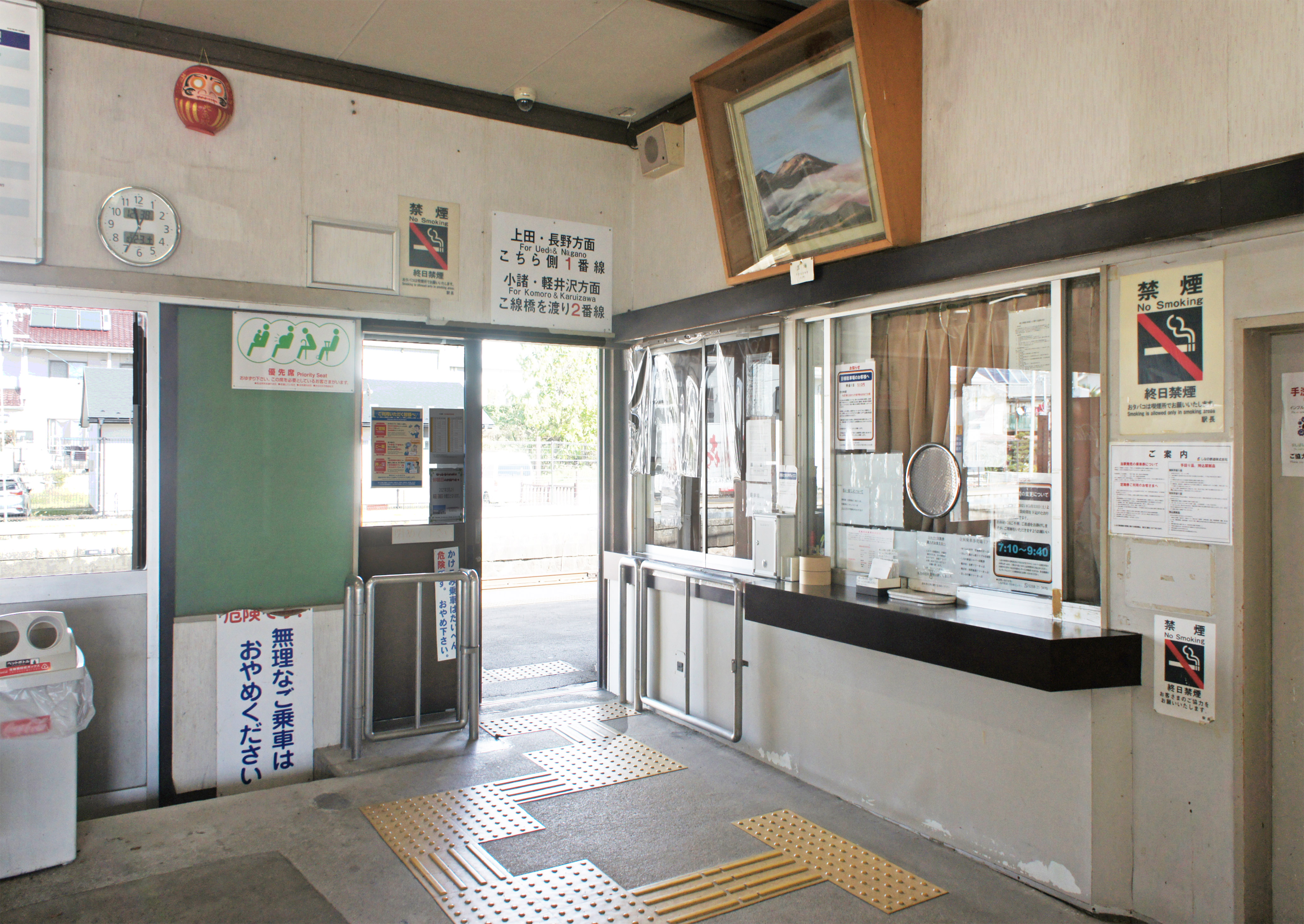
Old station building ticket gate

== Passenger statistics ==
In fiscal 2011, the station was used by an average of 2,320 passengers daily.

== Surrounding area ==
- National Route 152

== See also ==
- List of railway stations in Japan
