= Togura Station =

Railway station in Chikuma, Nagano Prefecture, Japan

Togura Station 戸倉駅
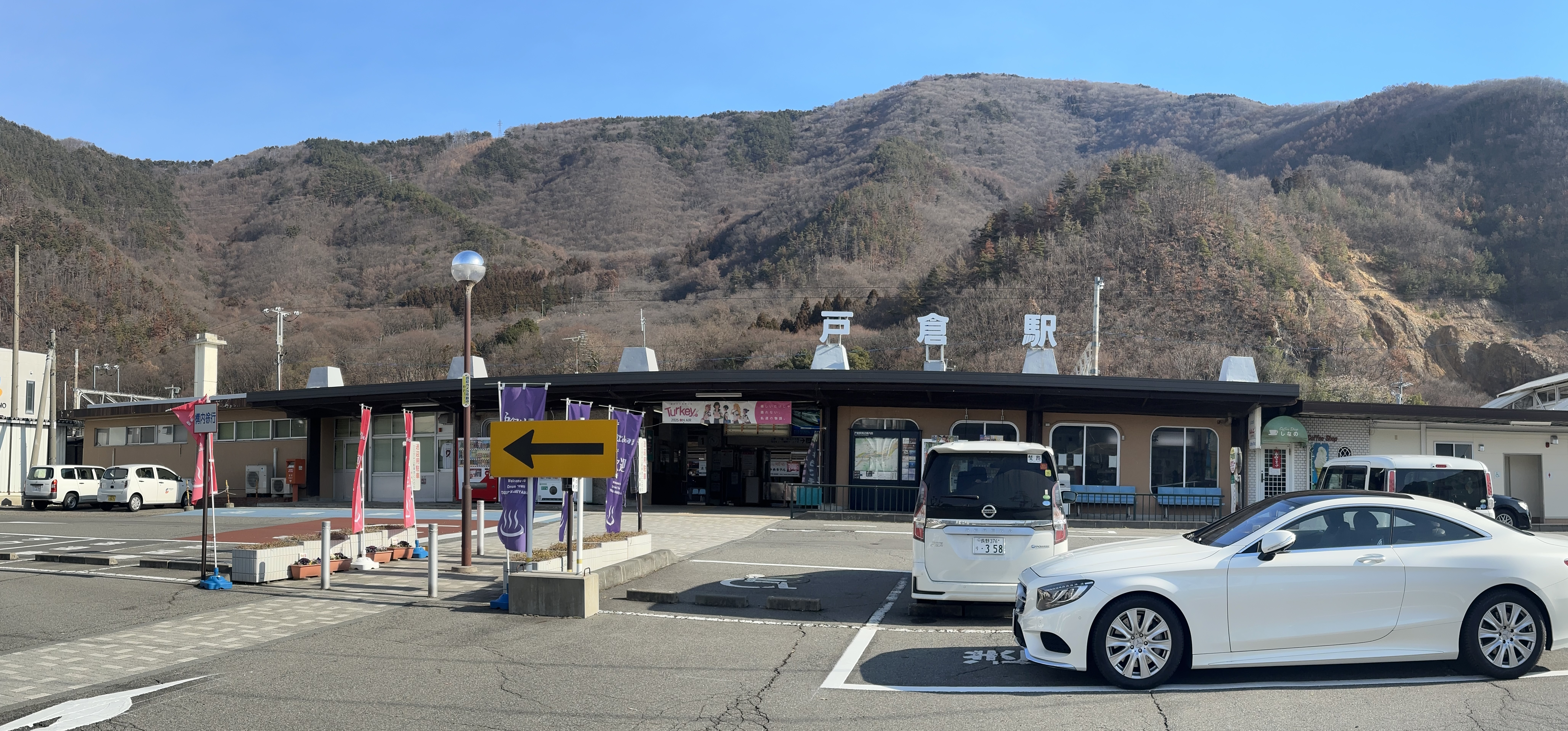
- Togura Station in January 2025

General information
- Location: 1445 Togura, Chikuma-shi, Nagano-ken 389-0804; Japan
- Coordinates: 36°29′32″N 138°09′11″E
- Elevation: 376 m (1,234 ft)
- Operator: Shinano Railway
- Line: ■ Shinano Railway Line
- Distance: 54.9 km from Karuizawa
- Platforms: 1 side + island platform
- Tracks: 3

Other information
- Status: Staffed
- Website: Official website

History
- Opened: 11 February 1912

Passengers
- FY2011: 2,650 daily
Location
- Location within Nagano Prefecture Location within Japan

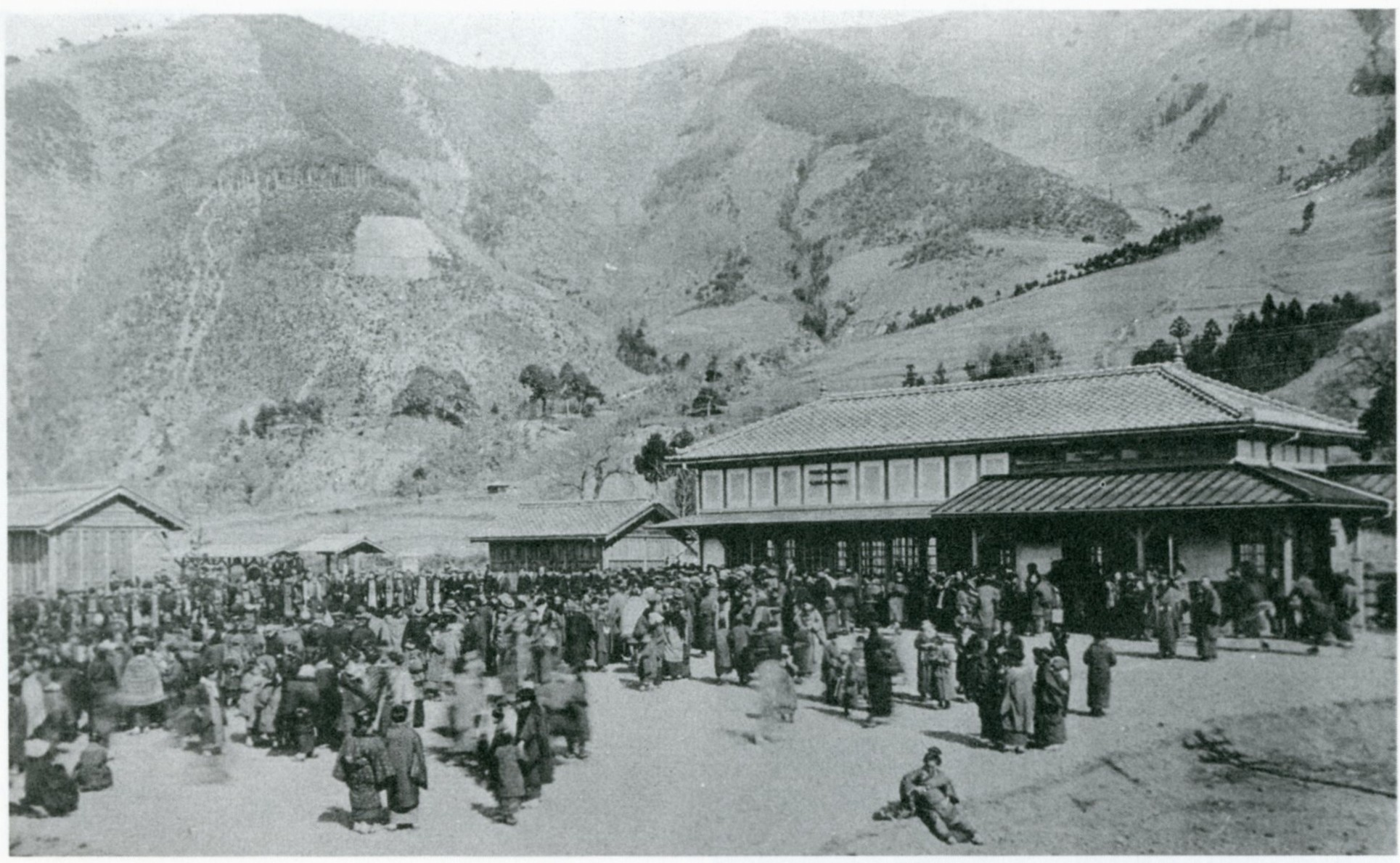
Togura Station in 1912

Togura Station (戸倉駅, Togura-eki) is a railway station on the Shinano Railway Line in the city of Chikuma, Nagano, Japan, operated by the third-sector railway operating company Shinano Railway.

== Lines ==
Togura Station is served by the Shinano Railway Line and is 54.9 kilometers from the starting point of the line at Karuizawa Station.

== Station layout ==
The station consists of one ground-level island platform and one side platform serving three tracks, connected to the station building by a footbridge. The station is staffed.

There is a soba stand on platform 1, also accessible from the station's waiting room.

=== Platforms ===
1	■ Shinano Railway Line	for Shinonoi and Nagano
2	■ Shinano Railway Line	-
3	■ Shinano Railway Line	for Ueda, Komoro, and Karuizawa

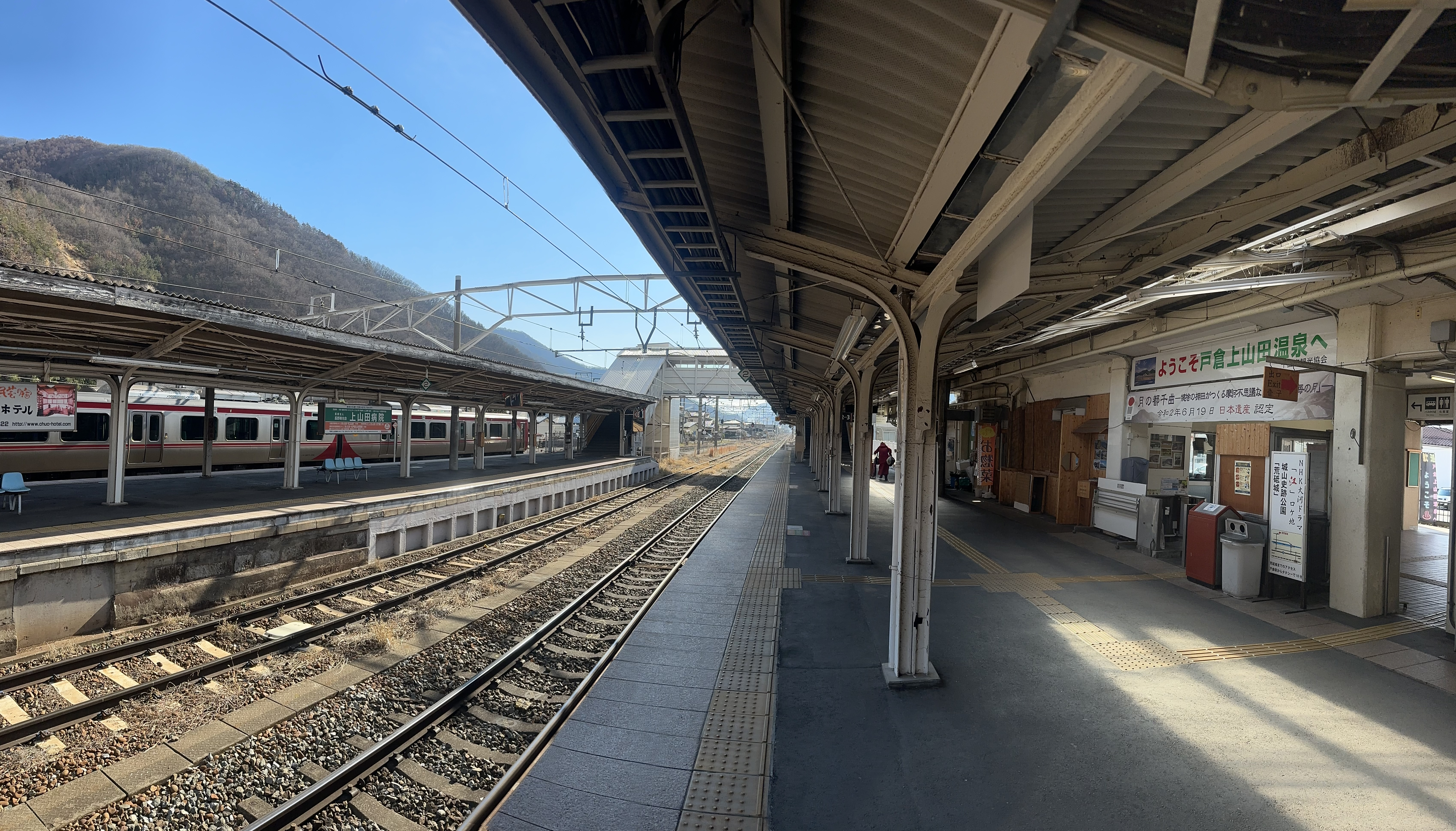
Station platforms

== Adjacent stations ==
←	Service	→
Shinano Railway Line
Sakaki	Local	Chikuma

== History ==
Togura Station opened on 11 February 1912.

== Passenger statistics ==
In fiscal 2011, the station was used by an average of 2,650 passengers daily.

== Surrounding area ==
- Togura Kamiyamada Onsen
- National Route 18

== See also ==
- List of railway stations in Japan
