= Japan National Route 18 =

National highway in Japan

National Route 18
- 国道18号
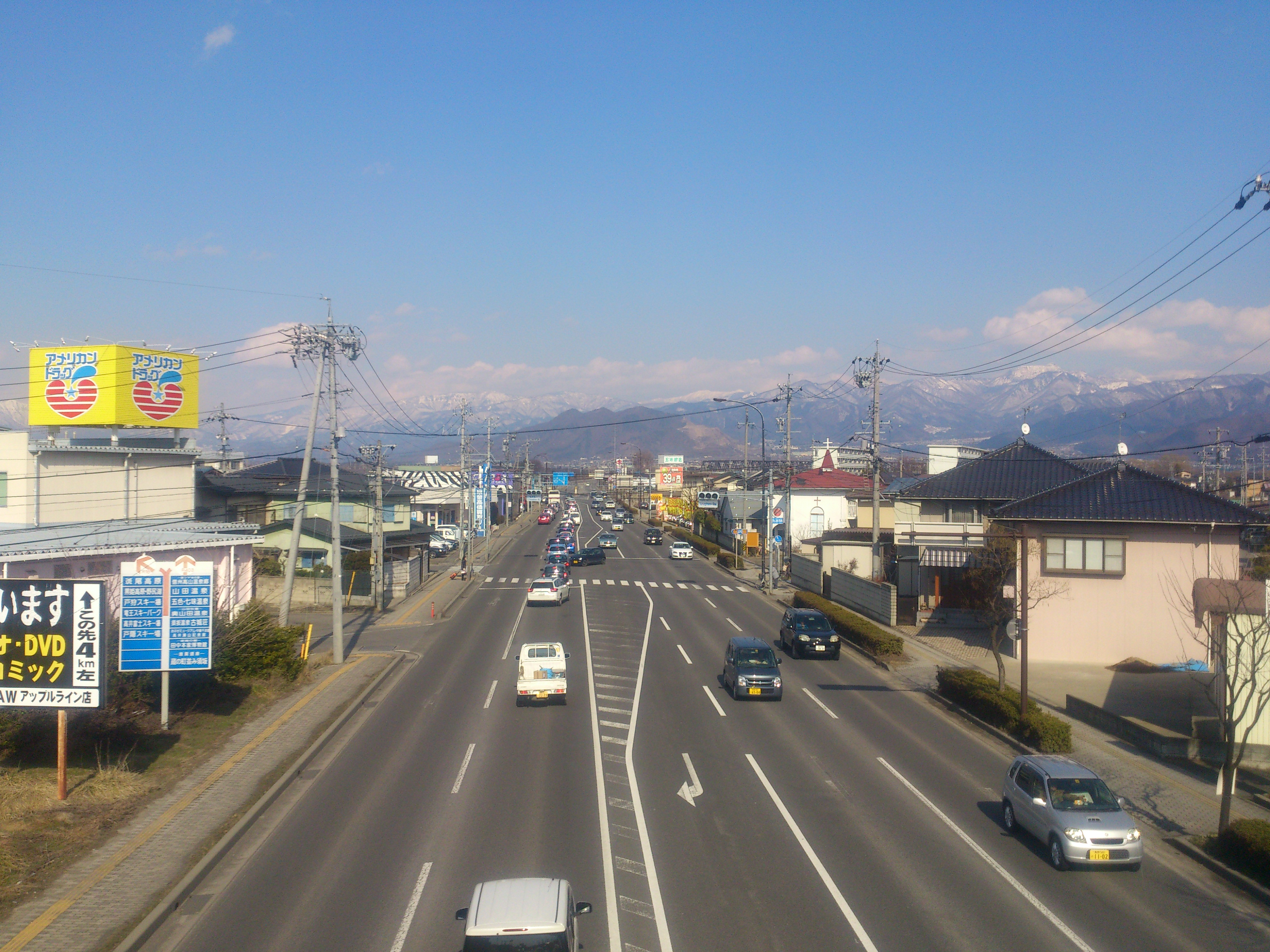

Route information
- Length: 193.9 km (120.5 mi)
- Existed: 4 December 1952–present

Major junctions
- North end: National Route 8 / National Route 350 in Jōetsu
- South end: National Route 17 in Takasaki

Location
- Country: Japan

Highway system
- National highways of Japan; Expressways of Japan
← National Route 17	→ National Route 19

National Route 18 (国道18号, Kokudō jūhachi-gō) is a national highway connecting Takasaki and Joetsu, Niigata in Japan. A section of the highway is designated as a part of the Japan Romantic Road.

== Route data ==
- Length: 193.9 km (120.5 mi)
- Origin: Takasaki (originates at junction with National Route 17)
- Terminus: Jōetsu, Niigata (ends at Junction with National Route 8 and National Route 350)
- Major cities: Komoro, Ueda, Chikuma, Nagano

== History ==
- 4 December 1952 - First Class National Highway 18 (from Takasaki to Joetsu)
- 1 April 1965 - General National Highway 18 (from Takasaki to Joetsu)

== Municipalities passed through ==
- Gunma Prefecture
  - Takasaki - Annaka
- Nagano Prefecture
  - Karuizawa - Miyota - Komoro - Tomi - Ueda - Sakaki - Chikuma - Nagano - Obuse - Nagano - Iizuna - Shinano
- Niigata Prefecture
  - Myōkō - Jōetsu - Myōkō - Jōetsu

== Intersects with ==
- Gunma Prefecture
  - Routes 17, 354 and 406; at Takasaki City
- Nagano Prefecture
  - Route 146; at Karuizawa Town
  - Route 141; at Komoro City - Ueda City
  - Routes 143, 144 and 152; at Ueda City
  - Route 403; at Chikuma City
  - Routes 19, 117 and 406; at Nagano City
- Niigata Prefecture
  - Route 292; at Myoko City
  - Route 405; at Joetsu City
  - Routes 8 and 350; at the terminus in Joetsu City

== Bypasses ==
Among other sections already finished, a bypass running on the west side of the Chikuma River from the extreme southern part of Nagano City to Ueda is currently under construction. As of 2008, only a small amount of sections of this bypass has been completed. The completed sections are in Ueda, just west of the Chikuma River, and in Chikuma from Inariyama to just south of Yawata.
