= Komoro Station =

Railway station in Komoro, Nagano Prefecture, Japan

Komoro Station 小諸駅
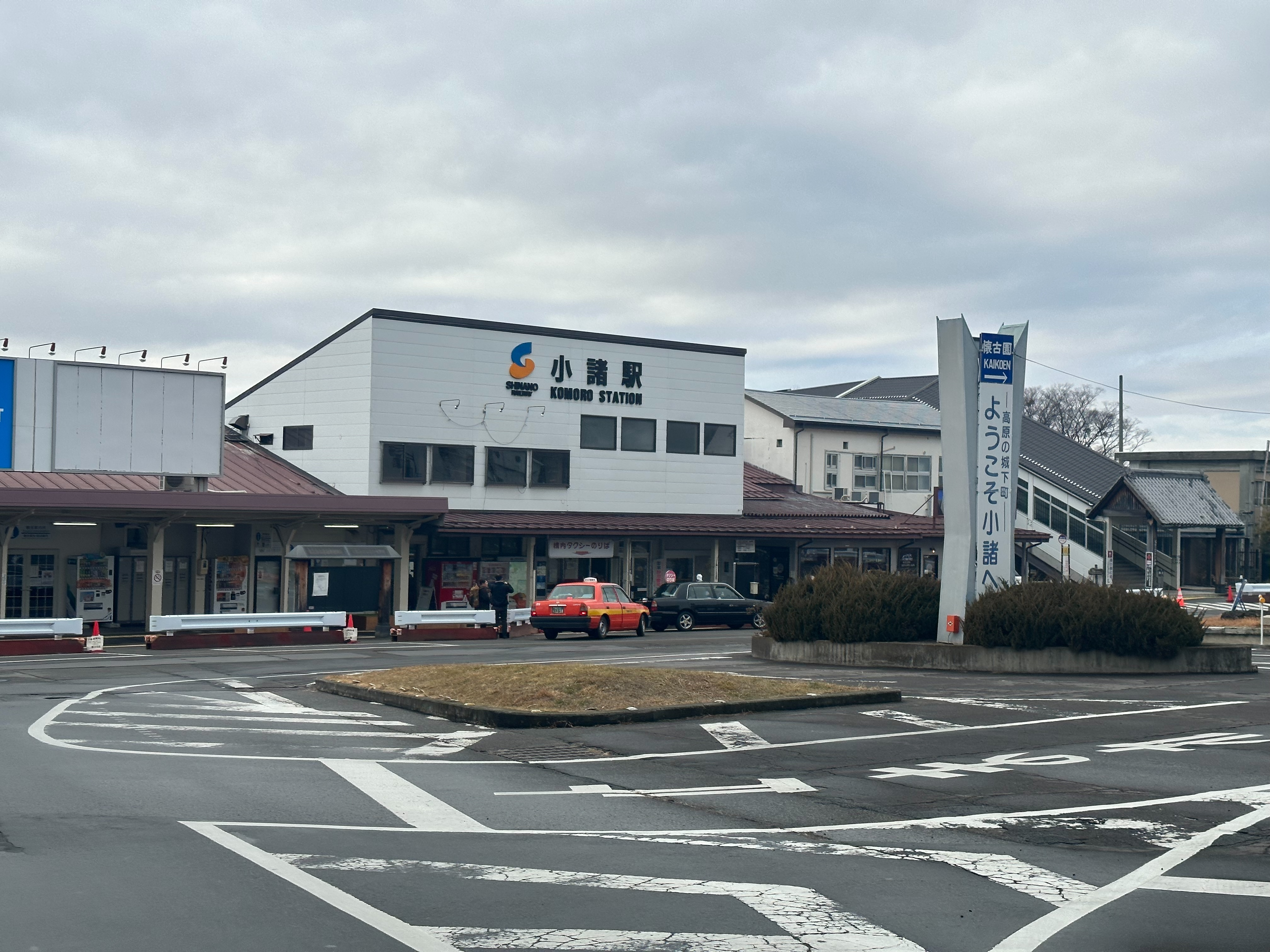
- Komoro Station in December 2023

General information
- Location: 1-1-1 Aioi-cho, Komoro-shi, Nagano-ken 384-0025; Japan
- Coordinates: 36.3266°N 138.4216°E
- Elevation: 663.0 meters
- Operator: Shinano Railway JR East
- Lines: ■ Shinano Railway Line; ■ Koumi Line
- Platforms: 1 side + 2 island platforms
- Tracks: 5

Other information
- Status: Staffed (Midori no Madoguchi)

History
- Opened: 15 December 1888

Passengers
- FY2015: 1,650 daily (JR East); 3,167 daily (Shinano Railway)

Services
Preceding station	JR East	Following station
Terminus	Koumi Line	Higashi-Komoro towards Kobuchizawa
Preceding station	Shinano Railway	Following station
Shigeno towards Nagano	Shinano Railway Line	Hirahara towards Karuizawa
Location
- Location within Nagano Prefecture Location within Japan

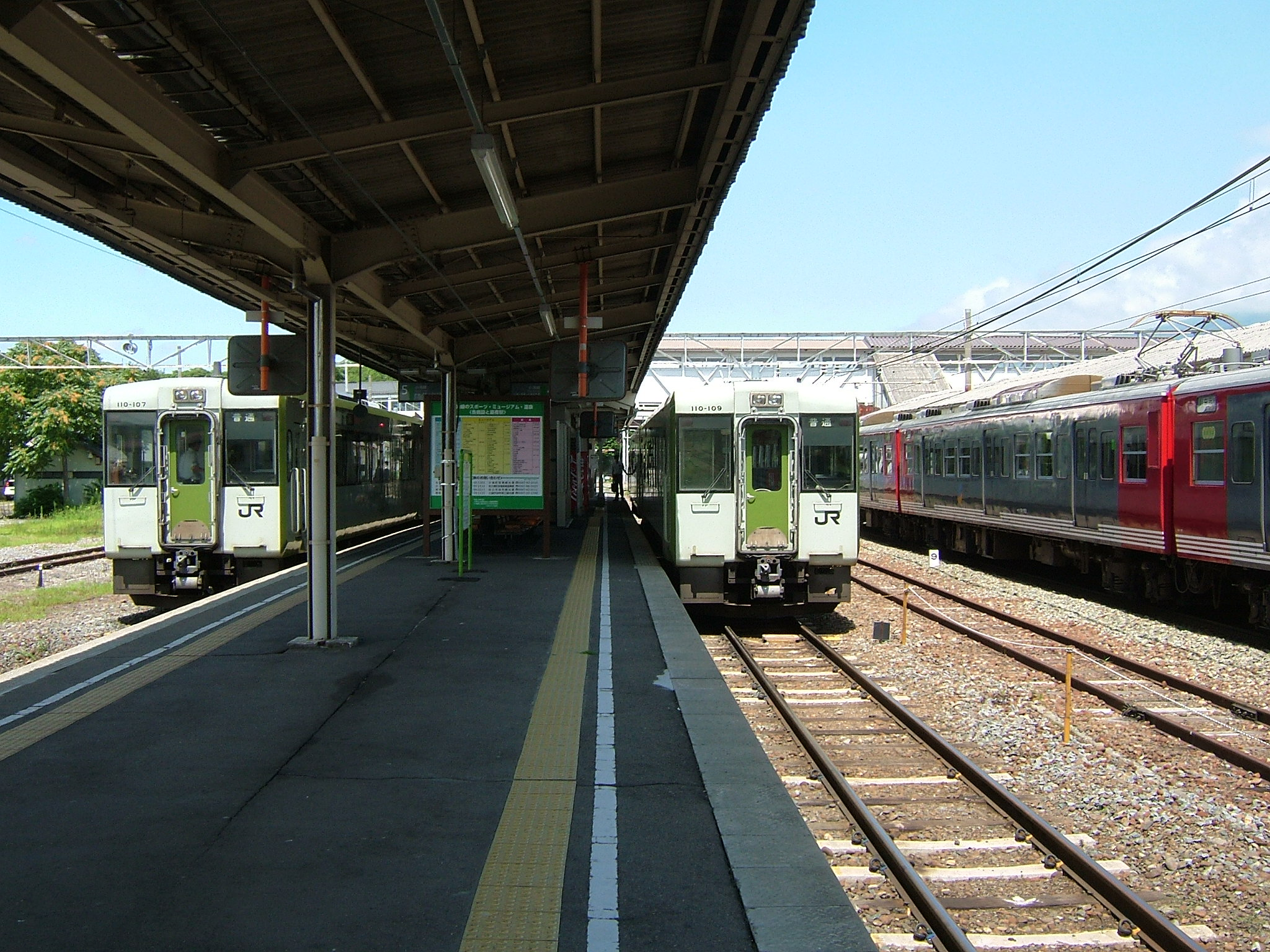
Koumi Line platform

Komoro Station (小諸駅, Komoro-eki) is a railway station on the Shinano Railway Line in Komoro, Nagano, Japan, jointly operated by the third-sector railway operating company Shinano Railway and JR East. It is managed by Shinano Railway.

== Lines ==
Komoro Station is served by the Shinano Railway Line and is 22.0 kilometers from the starting point of the line at Karuizawa Station. It is also a station on the Koumi Line, and is 78.9 kilometers from the starting point of that line at Kobuchizawa Station. From 1926 to 1936, the station was also used by the now defunct Nunobiki Electric Railway(ja).

== Station layout ==
The station consists of one ground-level side platform and two island platforms serving five tracks, connected to the station building by a footbridge. May 2018, the three elevators were installed and the barrier-free environment was completed. The station has a Midori no Madoguchi staffed ticket office.

=== Platforms ===
1	■ Shinano Railway Line	for Karuizawa
2	■ Shinano Railway Line	for Ueda, Shinonoi, and Nagano
3	■ Shinano Railway Line	for starting trains
4/5	■ Koumi Line	for Nakagomi, Koumi and Kobuchizawa

== History ==
The station opened on 1 December 1888.

== Passenger statistics ==
In fiscal 2015, the JR East portion of the station was used by an average of 1,650 passengers daily (boarding passengers only). The Shinano Railway portion of the station was used by 3,167 passengers in Fiscal 2015.

== Surrounding area ==
- Komoro ekimae Koban
- Komoro City Hall
- Komoro City Library
- Asama Nanroku Komoro Medical Center
- Komoro Aioi Post Office
- Komoro Castle Site (Kaikoen)
- Komoro Grand Castle Hotel
- Nakadana-Sô (Ryokan)
- Nishiura-Dam (TEPCO)

=== Bus routes ===
- JR Bus Expressway and route bus
  - For Shinjuku Station
  - For Takamine Mountain Resort
- Seibu Kanko Bus
  - For Ikebukuro Station
- Chikuma Bus
  - For Tachikawa Station
  - For Universal Studios Japan

== See also ==
- List of railway stations in Japan
