= Uedahara Station =

Railway station in Ueda, Nagano Prefecture, Japan

Uedahara Station 上田原駅
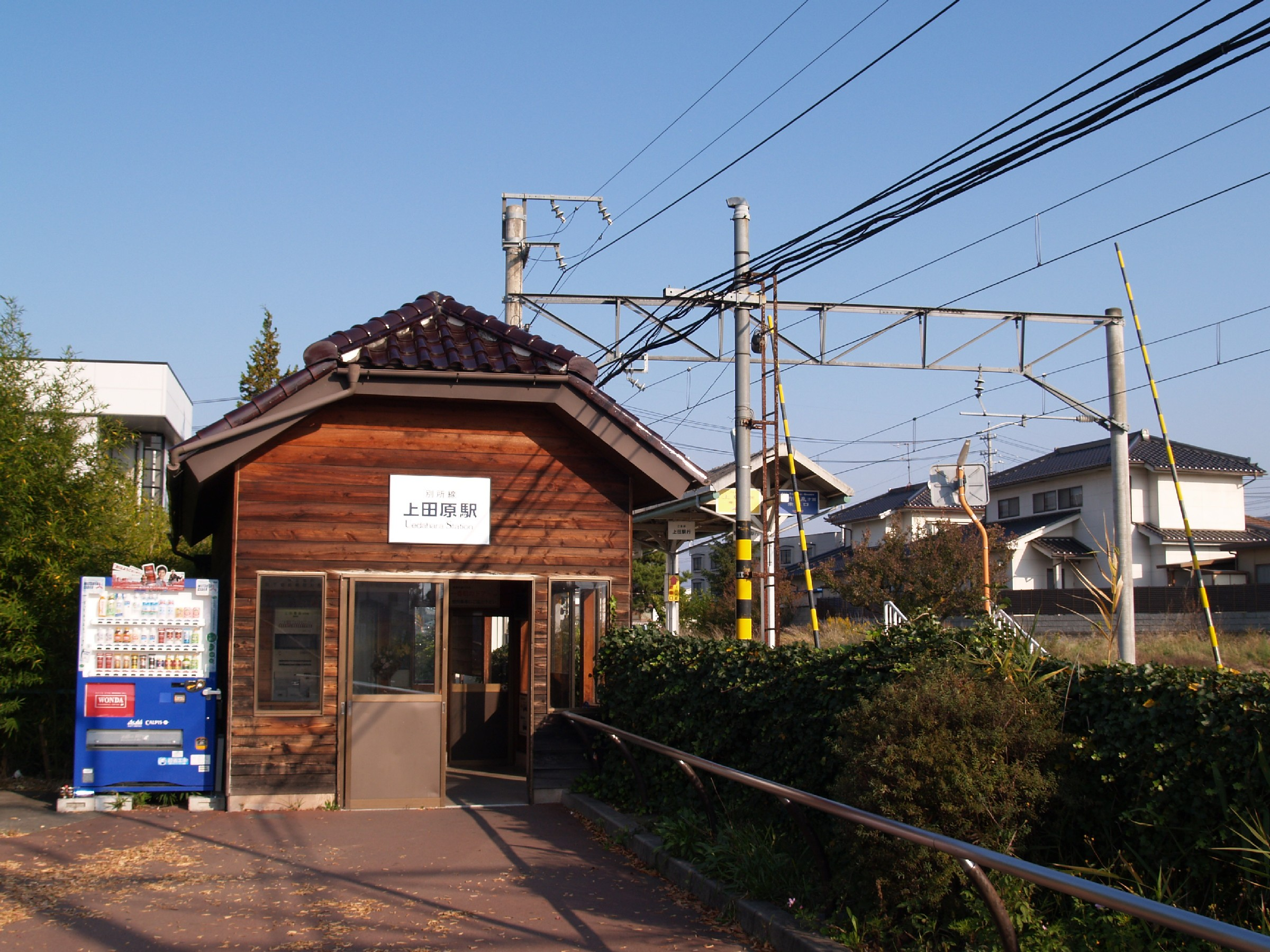
- Uedahara Station in October 2009

General information
- Location: Uedahara, Ueda-shi, Nagano-ken 386-1102; Japan
- Coordinates: 36°23′25.85″N 138°13′17.8″E
- Operator: Ueda Electric Railway
- Line: ■ Bessho Line
- Distance: 2.9 km from Ueda
- Platforms: 1 island platform
- Tracks: 2

Construction
- Structure type: Ground level

Other information
- Status: Staffed during peak hours
- Station code: BE05
- Website: Official website

History
- Opened: 17 June 1921

Passengers
- FY2015: 917 daily

Services
| Preceding station | Ueda Electric Railway | Following station |
|---|---|---|
| Terashita BE06 towards Bessho-Onsen | Bessho Line | Akasakaue BE04 towards Ueda |
Location
- Location within Nagano Prefecture Location within Japan

Uedahara Station (上田原駅, Uedahara-eki) is a railway station in the city of Ueda, Nagano, Japan, operated by the private railway operating company Ueda Electric Railway.

== Lines ==
Uedahara Station is served by the Bessho Line and is 2.9 kilometers from the terminus of the line at Ueda Station.

== Station layout ==
The station consists of one ground-level island platform serving two tracks. The station is staffed during weekday morning and evening peak hours.

=== Platforms ===
| 1 | ■ Ueda Electric Railway Bessho Line | for Shimonogō and Bessho-Onsen |
| 2 | ■ Ueda Electric Railway Bessho Line | for Ueda |

== History ==
Uedahara Station opened on 17 June 1921.

Station numbering was introduced in August 2016 with Uedahara being assigned station number BE05.

== Passenger statistics ==
In fiscal 2015, the station was used by an average of 917 passengers daily (boarding passengers only).

== Surrounding area ==
- National Route 143
- Site of the Battle of Uedahara
- Grave of Itagaki Nobukata
- Ueda Kawabe Elementary School
- Ueda Minami Elementary School

== See also ==
- List of railway stations in Japan
