= Daigakumae Station (Nagano) =

Railway station in Ueda, Nagano Prefecture, Japan

Daigakumae Station 大学前駅
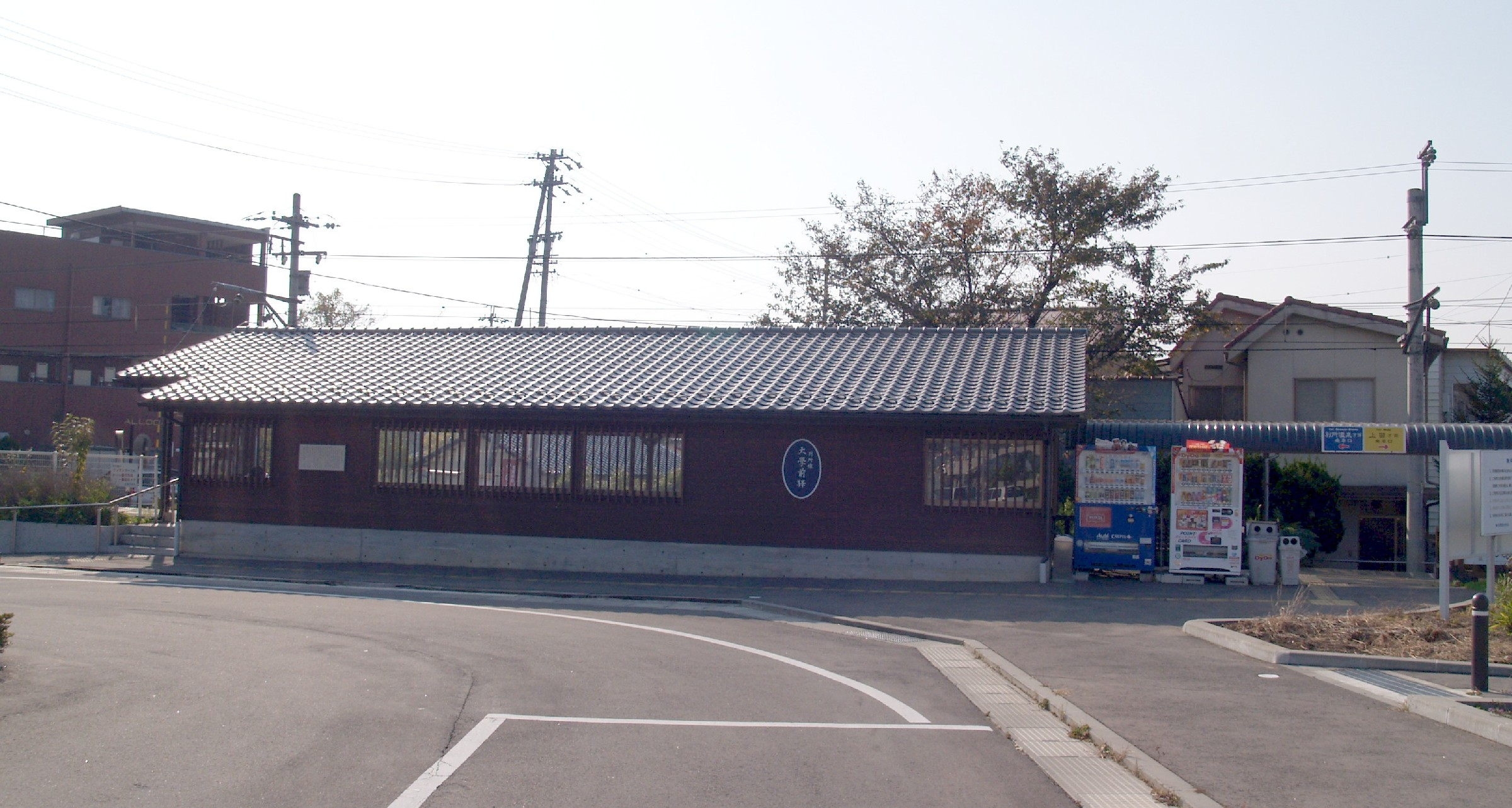
- Daigakumae Station in October 2009

General information
- Location: 284-5 Kamimukai, Shimonogō, Ueda-shi, Nagano-ken 386-1211; Japan
- Coordinates: 36°22′15.39″N 138°12′54.66″E
- Operator: Ueda Electric Railway
- Line: ■ Bessho Line
- Distance: 5.2 km from Ueda
- Platforms: 1 side platform
- Tracks: 1

Construction
- Structure type: Ground level

Other information
- Status: Unstaffed
- Station code: BE08
- Website: Official website

History
- Opened: 17 June 1921

Passengers
- FY2015: 777 daily

Services
Preceding station	Ueda Electric Railway	Following station
Shimonogō BE09 towards Bessho-Onsen	Bessho Line	Kabatake BE07 towards Ueda
Location
- Location within Nagano Prefecture Location within Japan

Daigakumae Station (大学前駅, Daigakumae-eki) is a railway station in the city of Ueda, Nagano, Japan, operated by the private railway operating company Ueda Electric Railway.

== Lines ==
Daigakumae Station is served by the Bessho Line and is 5.2 kilometers from the terminus of the line at Ueda Station.

== Station layout ==
The station consists of one ground-level side platform serving a single bi-directional track. The station is unattended.

== History ==
The station opened on 17 June 1921 as Shimohongō Station (下本郷駅) It was renamed Honshu Daigaku Mae Station (本州大学前駅) on 1 June 1966 and renamed again to its present name on 1 May 1974.

Station numbering was introduced in August 2016 with Daigakumae being assigned station number BE08.

== Passenger statistics ==
In fiscal 2015, the station was used by an average of 777 passengers daily (boarding passengers only).

== Surrounding area ==
- Nagano University
- Ueda Women's Junior College
- Nagano Prefectural Institute of Technology

== See also ==
- List of railway stations in Japan
