= Akasakaue Station =

Railway station in Ueda, Nagano Prefecture, Japan

Akasakaue Station 赤坂上駅
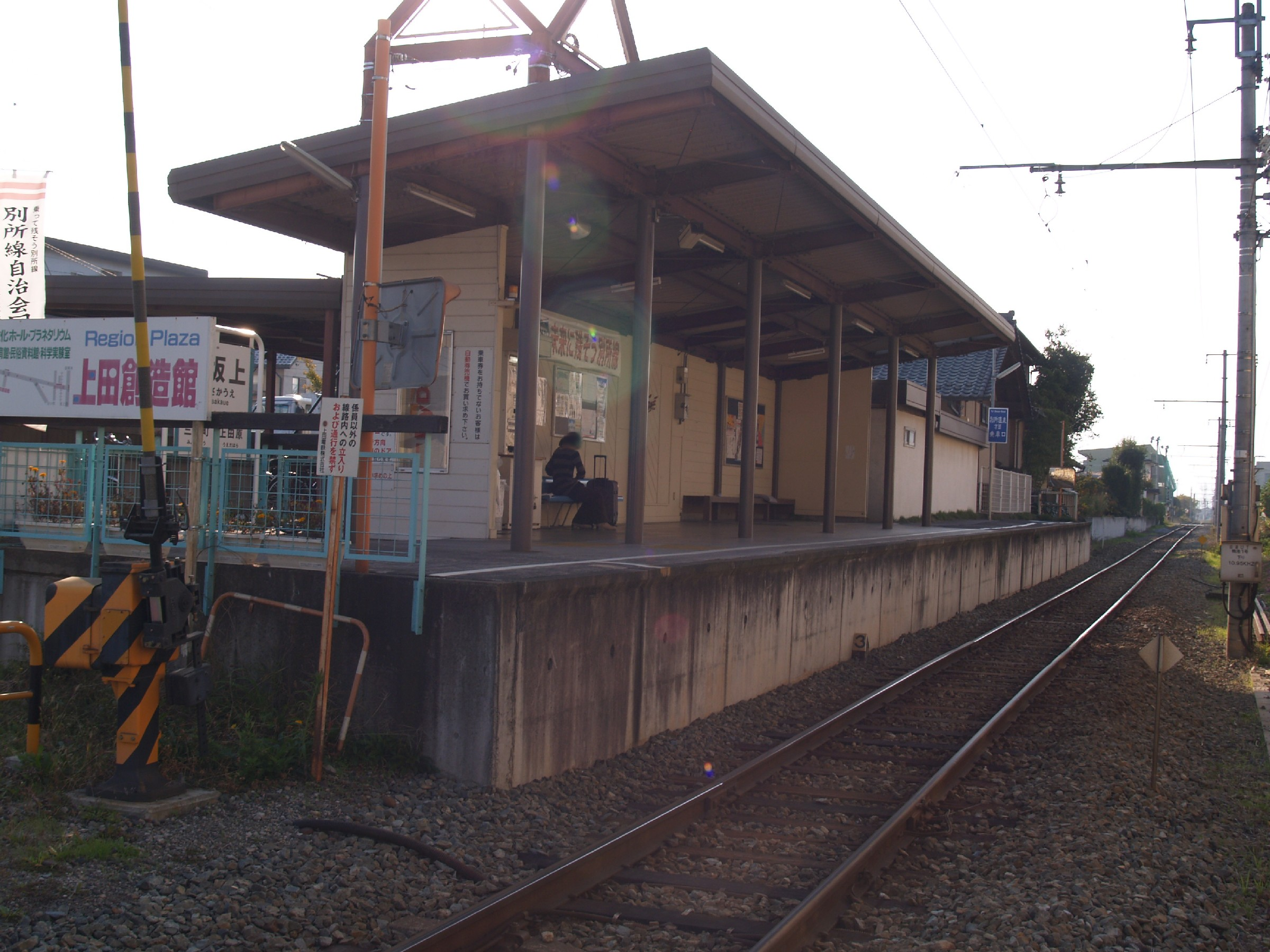
- Akasakaue Station in October 2009

General information
- Location: 975-5 Noguchi Uedahara, Ueda-shi, Nagano-ken 386-1102; Japan
- Coordinates: 36°23′29.08″N 138°13′39.16″E
- Operator: Ueda Electric Railway
- Line: ■ Bessho Line
- Distance: 2.2 km from Ueda
- Platforms: 1 side platform

Construction
- Structure type: Ground level

Other information
- Status: Unstaffed
- Station code: BE04
- Website: Official website

History
- Opened: 1932

Passengers
- FY2015: 128 daily

Services
Preceding station	Ueda Electric Railway	Following station
Uedahara BE05 towards Bessho-Onsen	Bessho Line	Miyoshichō BE03 towards Ueda
Location
- Location within Nagano Prefecture Location within Japan

Akasakaue Station (赤坂上駅, Akasakaue-eki) is a railway station in the city of Ueda, Nagano, Japan, operated by the private railway operating company Ueda Electric Railway.

== Lines ==
Akasakaue Station is served by the Bessho Line and is 2.2 kilometers from the terminus of the line at Ueda Station.

== Station layout ==
The station consists of one ground-level side platform serving a single bi-directional track. The station is unattended.

== History ==
Akasakaue Station opened in 1932.

Station numbering was introduced in August 2016 with Akasakaue being assigned station number BE04.

== Passenger statistics ==
In fiscal 2015, the station was used by an average of 128 passengers daily (boarding passengers only).

== Surrounding area ==
- National Route 143
- Ueda Chikuma High School

== See also ==
- List of railway stations in Japan
