= Terashita Station =

Railway station in Ueda, Nagano Prefecture, Japan

Terashita Station 寺下駅
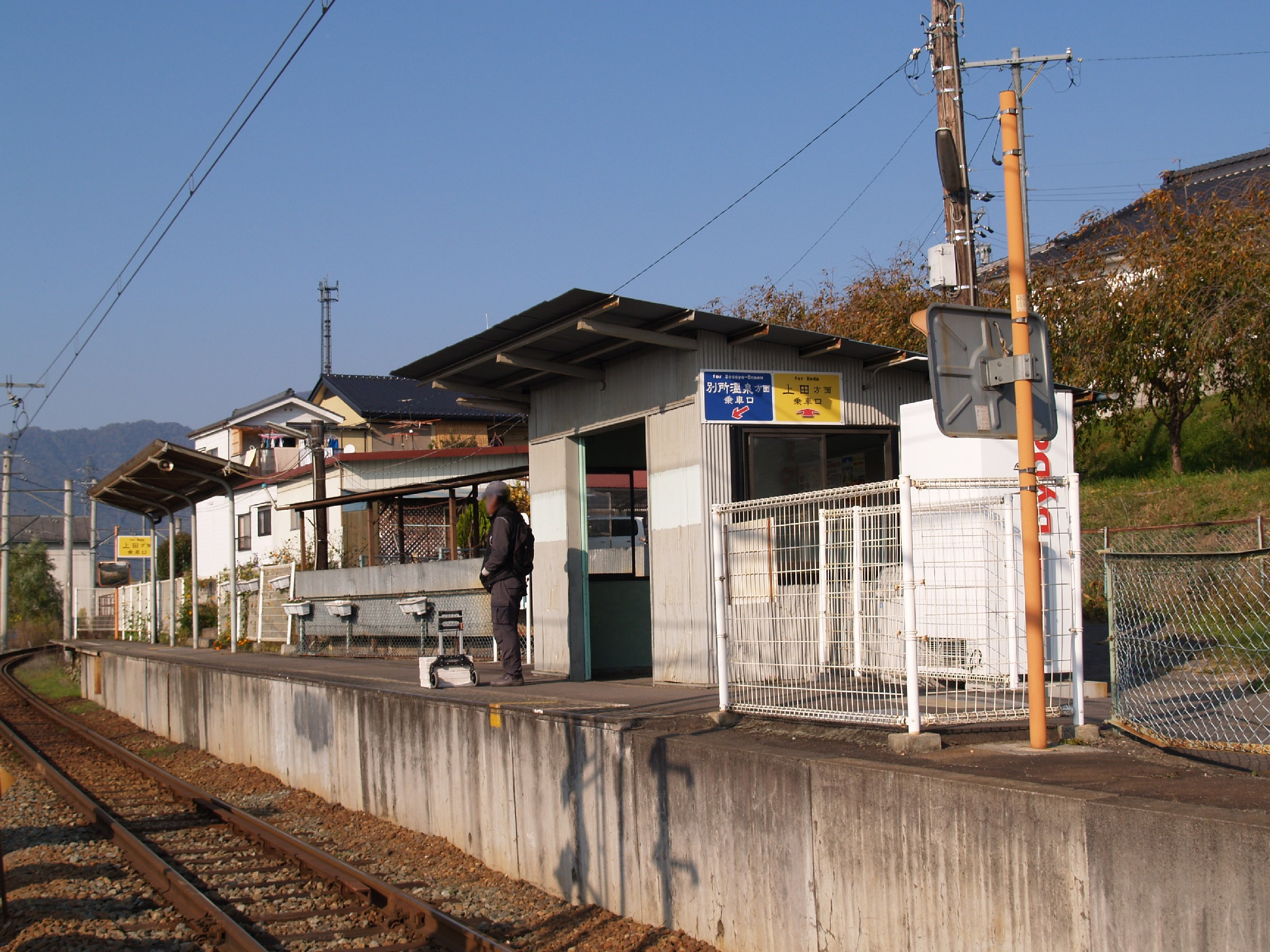
- Terashita Station in October 2009

General information
- Location: 616-1 Kabatake Terashita, Ueda-shi, Nagano-ken 386-1103; Japan
- Coordinates: 36°23′1.01″N 138°12′58.87″E
- Operator: Ueda Electric Railway
- Line: ■ Bessho Line
- Distance: 3.8 km from Ueda
- Platforms: 1 side platform
- Tracks: 1

Construction
- Structure type: Ground level

Other information
- Status: Unstaffed
- Station code: BE06
- Website: Official website

History
- Opened: 17 June 1921

Passengers
- FY2015: 63 daily

Services
| Preceding station | Ueda Electric Railway | Following station |
|---|---|---|
| Kabatake BE07 towards Bessho-Onsen | Bessho Line | Uedahara BE05 towards Ueda |
Location
- Location within Nagano Prefecture Location within Japan

Terashita Station (寺下駅, Terashita-eki) is a railway station in the city of Ueda, Nagano, Japan, operated by the private railway operating company Ueda Electric Railway.

== Lines ==
Terashita Station is served by the Bessho Line and is 3.8 kilometers from the terminus of the line at Ueda Station.

== Station layout ==
The station consists of one ground-level side platform serving a single bi-directional track. The station is unattended.

== History ==
Terashita station opened on 17 June 1921.

Station numbering was introduced in August 2016 with Terashita being assigned station number BE06.

== Passenger statistics ==
In fiscal 2015, the station was used by an average of 63 passengers daily (boarding passengers only).

== Surrounding area ==
- National Route 143
- Chosei-ji

== See also ==
- List of railway stations in Japan
