= Nakashioda Station =

Railway station in Ueda, Nagano Prefecture, Japan

Nakashioda Station 中塩田駅
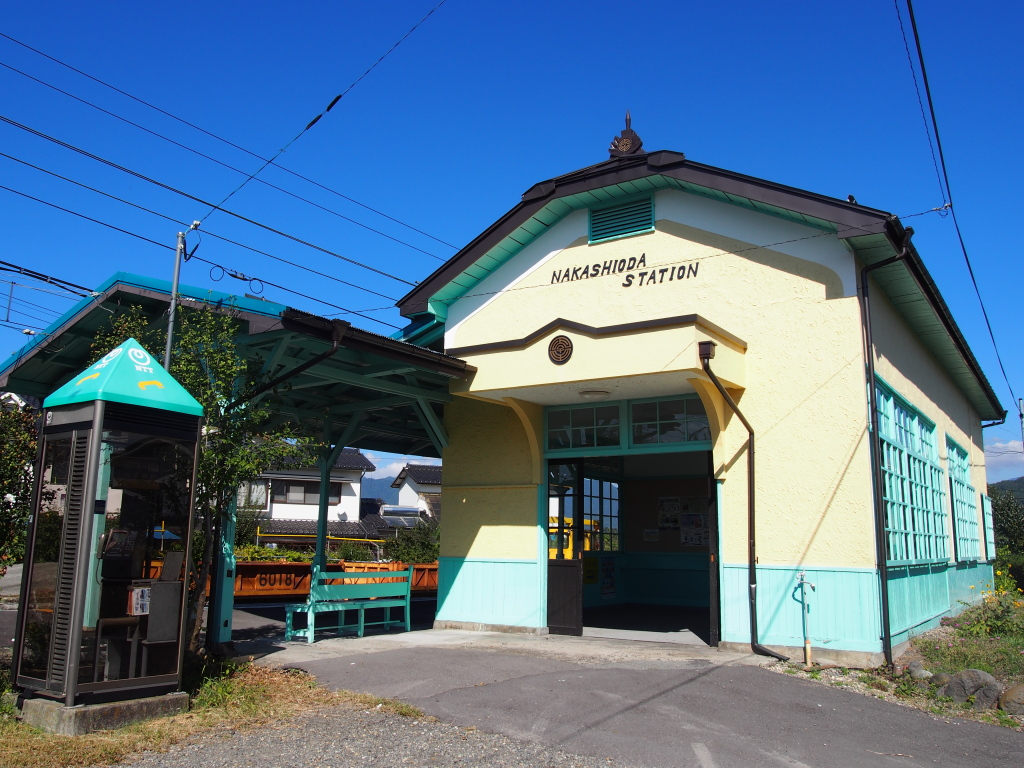
- Nakashioda Station in August 2012

General information
- Location: 517-3 Shimonogō, Ueda-shi, Nagano-ken 386-1211; Japan
- Coordinates: 36°21′47.19″N 138°12′16.96″E
- Operator: Ueda Electric Railway
- Line: ■ Bessho Line
- Distance: 7.4 km (4.6 mi) from Ueda
- Platforms: 1 side platform
- Tracks: 1

Construction
- Structure type: Ground level

Other information
- Status: Unstaffed
- Station code: BE10
- Website: Official website

History
- Opened: 17 June 1921
- Former names: Goka Station (to 1929)

Passengers
- FY2015: 20 daily

Services
Preceding station	Ueda Electric Railway	Following station
Shiodamachi BE11 towards Bessho-Onsen	Bessho Line	Shimonogō BE09 towards Ueda
Location
- Location within Nagano Prefecture Location within Japan

Nakashioda Station (中塩田駅, Nakashioda-eki) is a railway station in the city of Ueda, Nagano, Japan, operated by the private railway operating company Ueda Electric Railway.

== Lines ==
Nakashioda Station is served by the Bessho Line and is 7.4 kilometres (4.6 mi) from the terminus of the line at Ueda Station.

== Station layout ==
The station consists of one ground-level side platform serving a single bi-directional track. The station is not attended.

== History ==
The station opened on 17 June 1921 as Goka Station (五加駅). It was renamed to its present name on 3 March 1929.

Station numbering was introduced in August 2016 with Nakashioda being assigned station number BE10.

== Passenger statistics ==
In fiscal 2015, the station was used by an average of 20 passengers daily (boarding passengers only).

== Surrounding area ==
- Nakashioda Elementary School

== See also ==
- List of railway stations in Japan
