= Shiroshita Station =

Railway station in Ueda, Nagano Prefecture, Japan

Shiroshita Station 城下駅
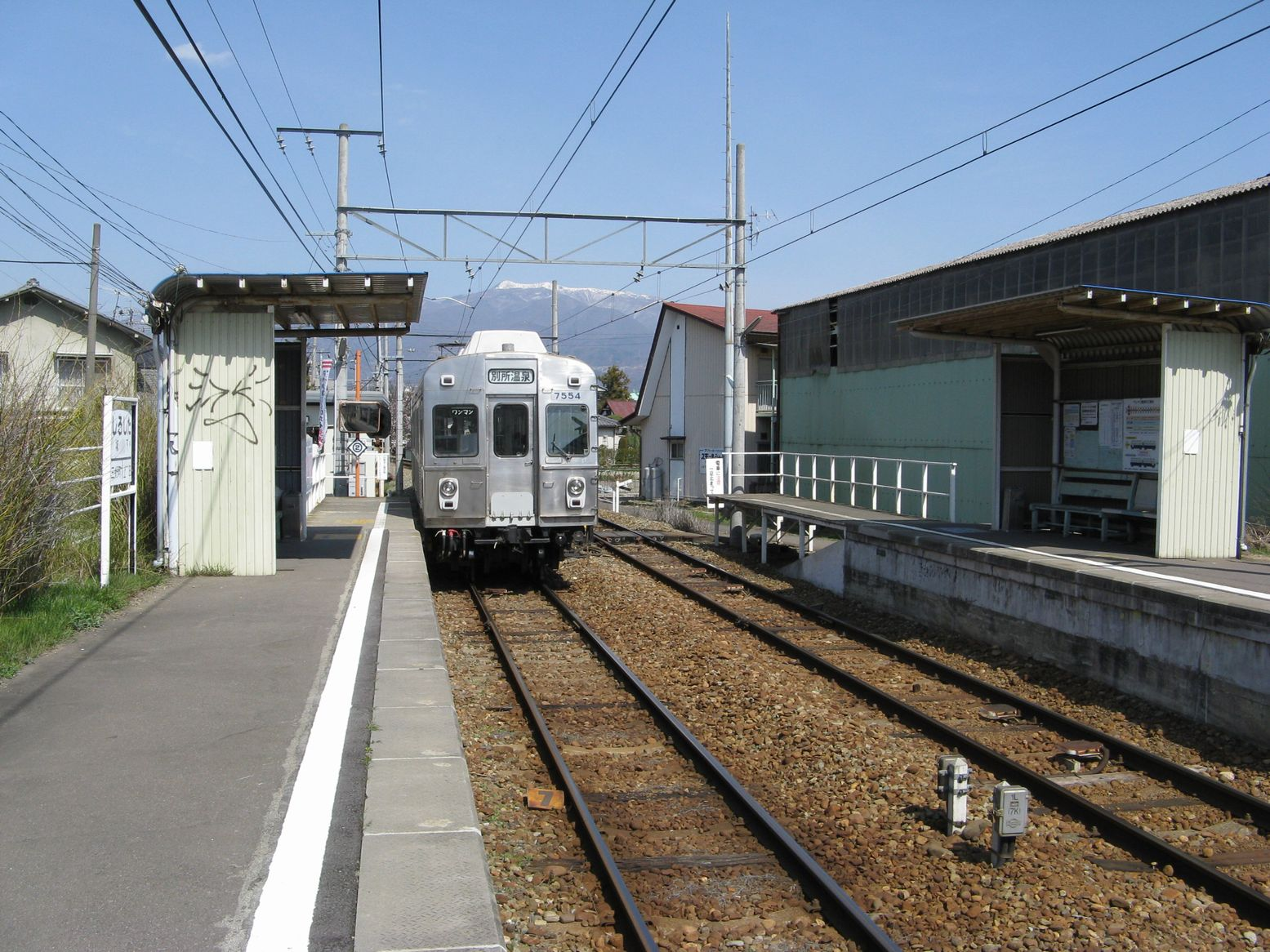
- Shiroshita Station in April 2008

General information
- Location: 982 Suwagata-Nakata, Ueda-shi, Nagano-ken 386-0032; Japan
- Coordinates: 36°23′33.13″N 138°14′33.36″E
- Operator: Ueda Electric Railway
- Line: ■ Bessho Line
- Distance: 0.8 km from Ueda
- Platforms: 2 side platforms

Other information
- Status: Unstaffed
- Station code: BE02
- Website: Official website

History
- Opened: 17 June 1921
- Former names: Miyoshichō (to 1927)

Passengers
- FY2015: 18 daily

Services
Preceding station	Ueda Electric Railway	Following station
Miyoshichō BE03 towards Bessho-Onsen	Bessho Line	Ueda BE01 Terminus
Location
- Location within Nagano Prefecture Location within Japan

Shiroshita Station (城下駅, Shiroshita-eki) is a railway station in the city of Ueda, Nagano, Japan, operated by the private railway operating company Ueda Electric Railway.

== Lines ==
Shiroshita Station is served by the Bessho Line and is 0.8 kilometers from the terminus of the line at Ueda Station.

== Station layout ==
The station consists of two ground-level opposed side platforms. The platforms are not numbered. The station is unattended.

=== Platforms ===
"south"	■ Ueda Electric Railway Bessho Line	for Shimonogō and Bessho-Onsen
"north"	■ Ueda Electric Railway Bessho Line	for Ueda

== History ==
The station opened on 17 June 1921 as Miyoshichō Station (三好町駅). It was renamed Shiroshita Station in December 1927.

Station numbering was introduced in August 2016 with Shiroshita being assigned station number BE02.

== Passenger statistics ==
In fiscal 2015, the station was used by an average of 18 passengers daily (boarding passengers only).

== Surrounding area ==
- Miyoshichō Post Office
- Shiroshita Elementary School
- Chikuma River

== See also ==
- List of railway stations in Japan
