= Miyoshichō Station =

Railway station in Ueda, Nagano Prefecture, Japan

Miyoshichō Station 三好町駅
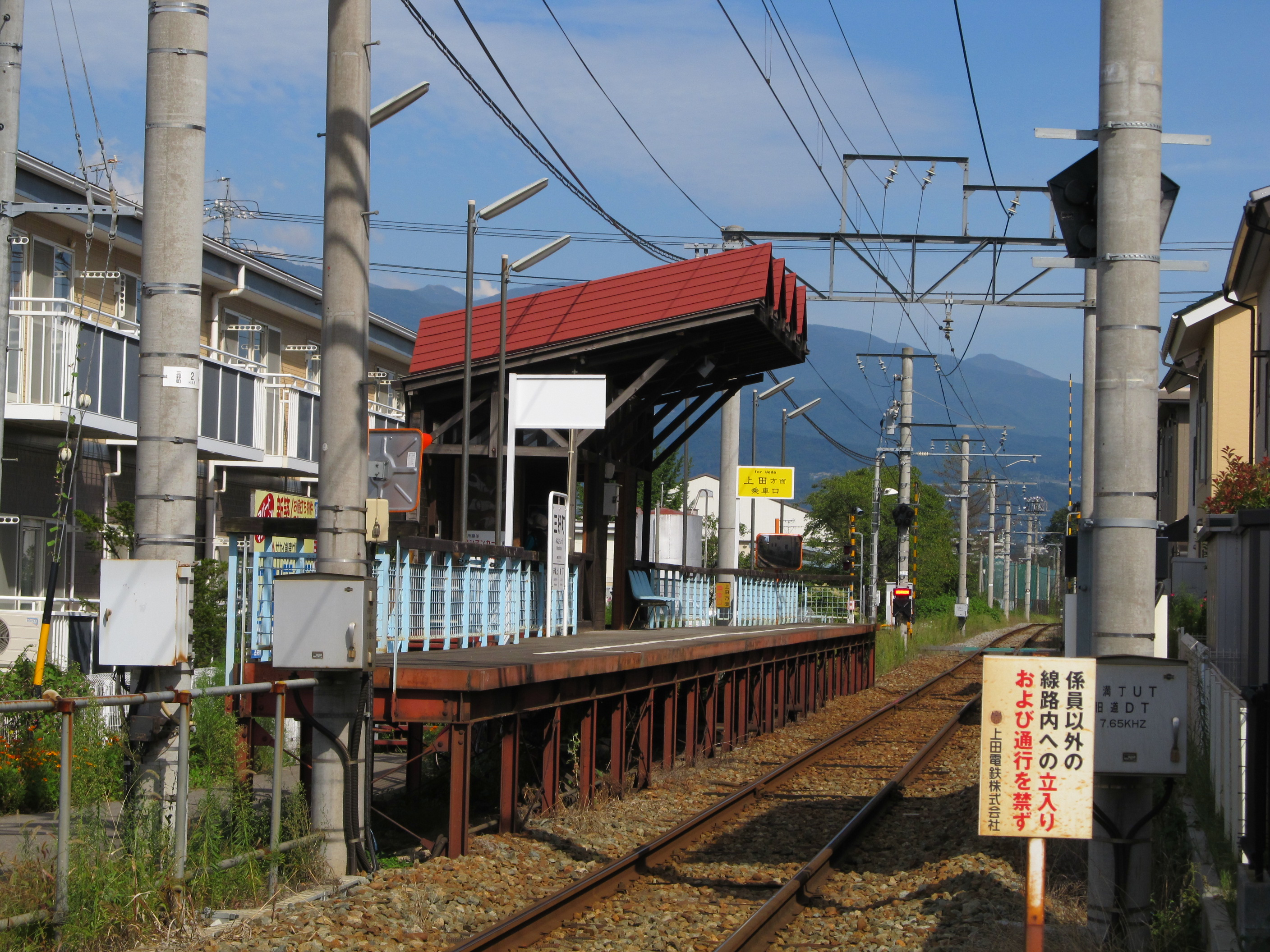
- Miyoshichō Station in September 2011

General information
- Location: Gosho, Ueda-shi, Nagano-ken 386-0033; Japan
- Coordinates: 36°23′30.29″N 138°14′7.27″E
- Operator: Ueda Electric Railway
- Line: ■ Bessho Line
- Distance: 1.5 km from Ueda
- Platforms: 1 side platform

Other information
- Status: Unstaffed
- Station code: BE03
- Website: Official website

History
- Opened: 17 June 1921

Passengers
- FY2015: 24 daily

Services
Preceding station	Ueda Electric Railway	Following station
Akasakaue BE04 towards Bessho-Onsen	Bessho Line	Shiroshita BE02 towards Ueda
Location
- Location within Nagano Prefecture Location within Japan

Miyoshichō Station (三好町駅, Miyoshichō-eki) is a railway station in the city of Ueda, Nagano, Japan, operated by the private railway operating company Ueda Electric Railway.

== Lines ==
Miyoshichō Station is served by the Bessho Line and is 1.5 kilometers from the terminus of the line at Ueda Station.

== Station layout ==
The station consists of one ground-level side platform serving a single bi-directional track. The station is unattended.

== History ==
The station opened on 17 June 1921 as Miyoshichō San-chōme Station (三好町三丁目駅). It was renamed to its present name in December 1927. However, on 1 September 1939 it was renamed Kōkūjō-guchi Station (飛行場口駅) after an Imperial Japanese Army air field established in the area. The name reverted to Miyoshichō Station in 1945 after the end of the war.

Station numbering was introduced in August 2016 with Miyoshichō being assigned station number BE03.

== Passenger statistics ==
In fiscal 2015, the station was used by an average of 24 passengers daily (boarding passengers only).

== Surrounding area ==
- Ueda Chikuma High School
- Ueda No.4 Middle School

== See also ==
- List of railway stations in Japan
