= Kabatake Station =

Railway station in Ueda, Nagano Prefecture, Japan

Kabatake Station 神畑駅
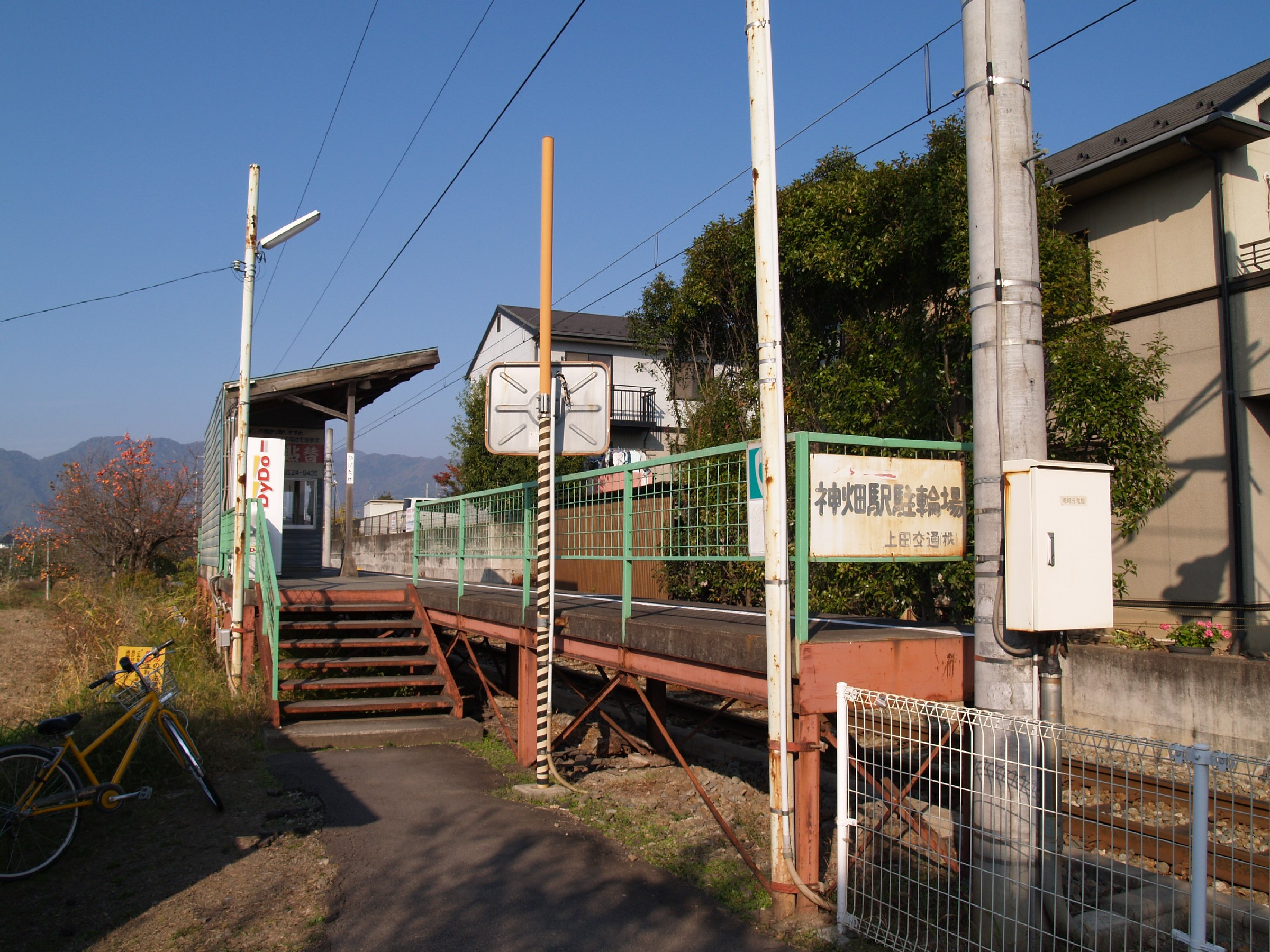
- Kabatake Station in October 2009

General information
- Location: Kabatake, Ueda-shi, Nagano-ken 386-1103; Japan
- Coordinates: 36°22′39.58″N 138°13′0.65″E
- Operator: Ueda Electric Railway
- Line: ■ Bessho Line
- Distance: 4.5 km from Ueda
- Platforms: 1 side platform
- Tracks: 1

Construction
- Structure type: Ground level

Other information
- Status: Unstaffed
- Station code: BE07
- Website: Official website

History
- Opened: 17 June 1921

Passengers
- FY2015: 46 daily

Services
Preceding station	Ueda Electric Railway	Following station
Daigakumae BE08 towards Bessho-Onsen	Bessho Line	Terashita BE06 towards Ueda
Location
- Location within Nagano Prefecture Location within Japan

Kabatake Station (神畑駅, Kabatake-eki) is a railway station in the city of Ueda, Nagano, Japan, operated by the private railway operating company Ueda Electric Railway.

== Lines ==
Kabatake Station is served by the Bessho Line and is 4.5 kilometers from the terminus of the line at Ueda Station.

== Station layout ==
The station consists of one ground-level side platform serving a single bi-directional track. The station is unattended.

== History ==
Kabatake station opened on 17 June 1921.

Station numbering was introduced in August 2016 with Kabatake being assigned station number BE07.

== Passenger statistics ==
In fiscal 2015, the station was used by an average of 46 passengers daily (boarding passengers only).

== Surrounding area ==
- Organ Needle Company factory

== See also ==
- List of railway stations in Japan
