= Yagisawa Station =

Railway station in Ueda, Nagano Prefecture, Japan

Yagisawa Station 八木沢駅
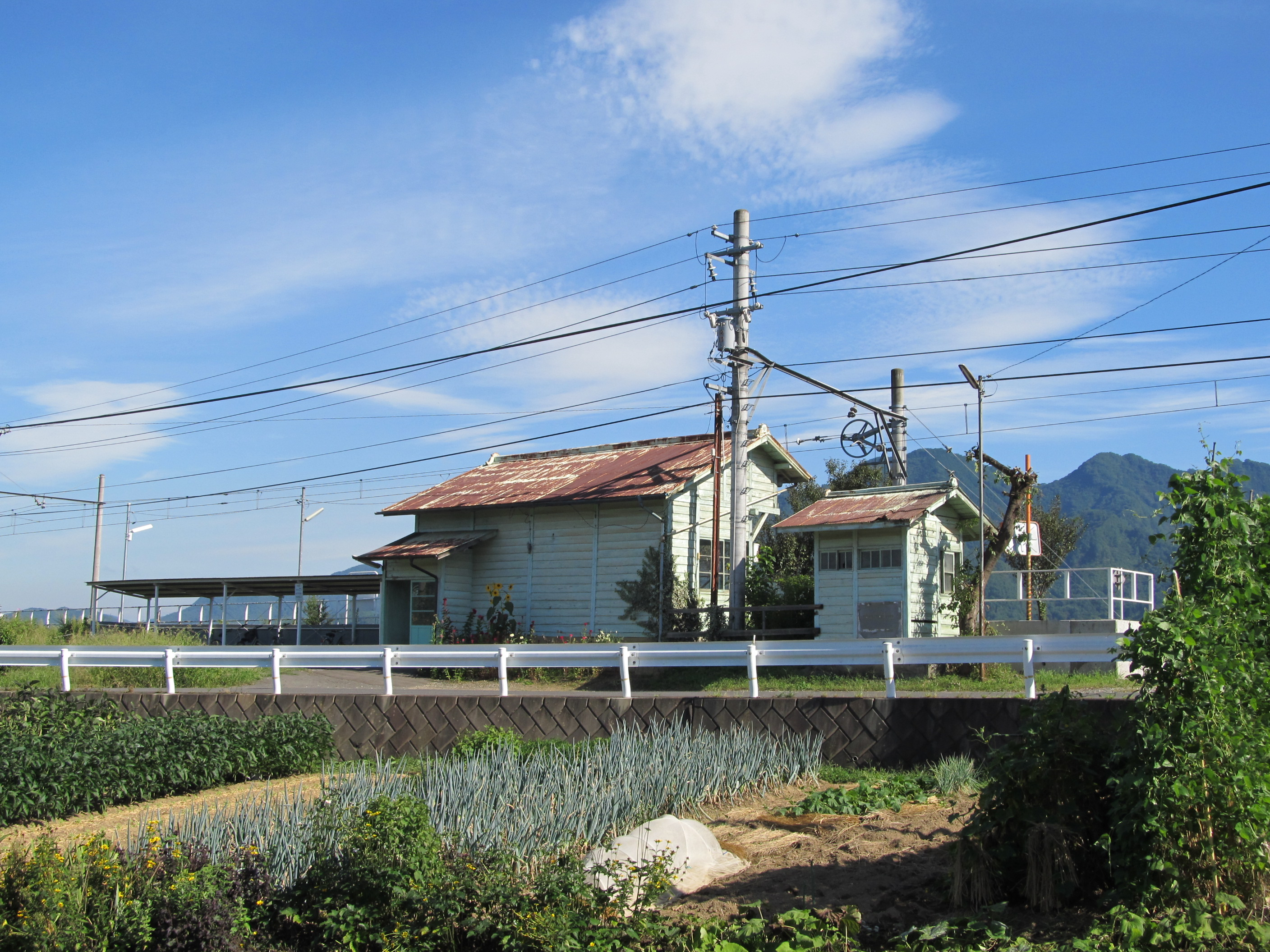
- Yagisawa Station in September 2011

General information
- Location: Yagisawa, Ueda-shi, Nagano-ken 386-1327; Japan
- Coordinates: 36°21′30.58″N 138°10′31.37″E
- Operator: Ueda Electric Railway
- Line: ■ Bessho Line
- Distance: 10.1 km from Ueda
- Platforms: 1 side platform
- Tracks: 1

Other information
- Status: Unstaffed
- Station code: BE14
- Website: Official website

History
- Opened: 17 June 1921

Passengers
- FY2015: 33 daily

Services
Preceding station	Ueda Electric Railway	Following station
Bessho-Onsen BE15 Terminus	Bessho Line	Maita BE13 towards Ueda
Location
- Location within Nagano Prefecture Location within Japan

Yagisawa Station (八木沢駅, Yagisawa-eki) is a railway station in the city of Ueda, Nagano, Japan, operated by the private railway operating company Ueda Electric Railway.

== Lines ==
Yagisawa Station is served by the Bessho Line and is 10.1 kilometers from the terminus of the line at Ueda Station.

== Station layout ==
The station consists of one ground-level side platforms serving a single bi-directional track. The station is not attended.

== History ==
The station opened on 17 June 1921.

Station numbering was introduced in August 2016 with Yagisawa being assigned station number BE14.

== Passenger statistics ==
In fiscal 2015, the station was used by an average of 33 passengers daily (boarding passengers only).

== Surrounding area ==
- Shioda Nishi Elementary School

== See also ==
- List of railway stations in Japan
