= Shimonogō Station =

Railway station in Ueda, Nagano Prefecture, Japan

Shimonogō Station 下之郷駅
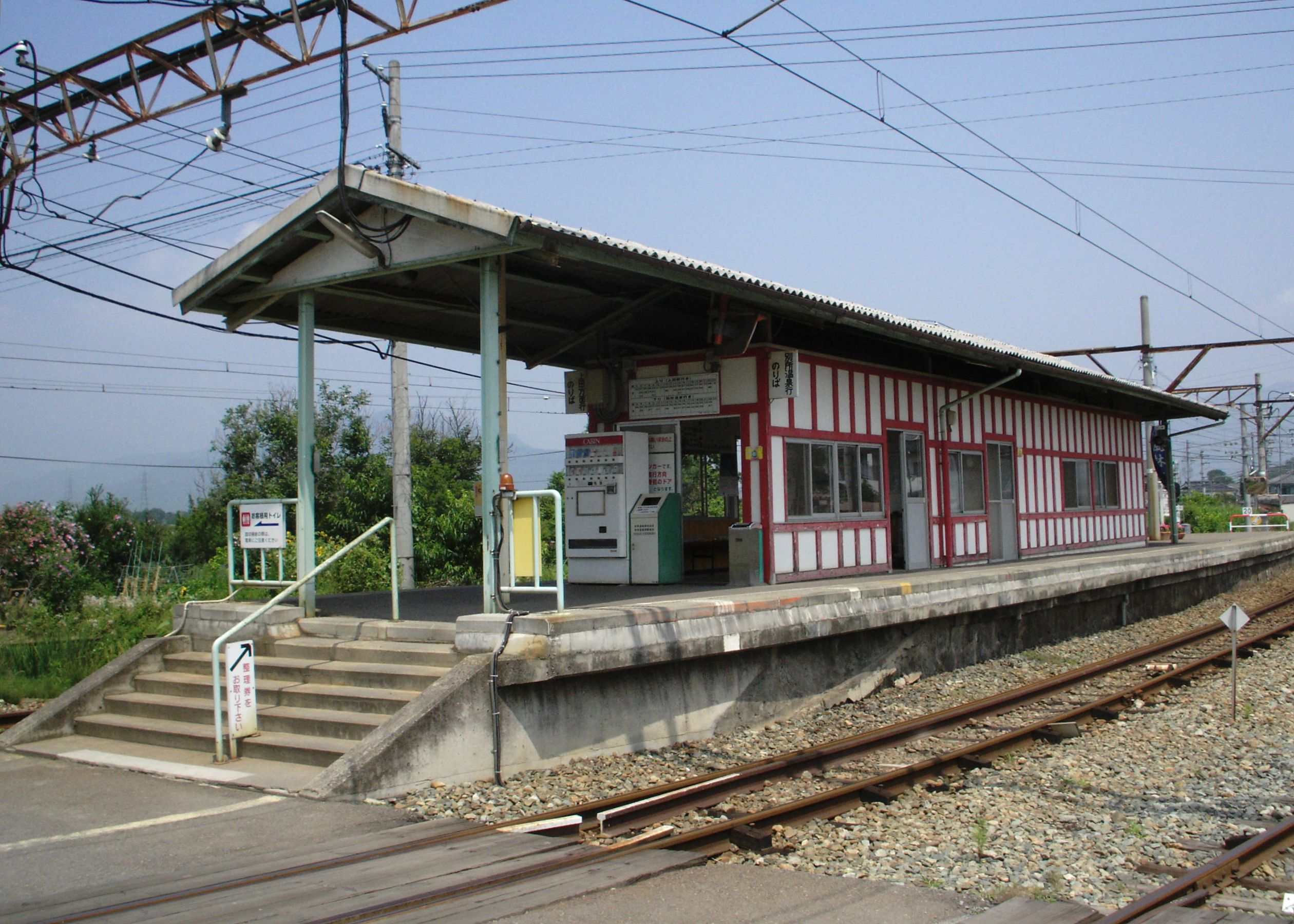
- Shimonogō Station in July 2007

General information
- Location: 517-3 Shimonogō, Ueda-shi, Nagano-ken 386-1211; Japan
- Coordinates: 36°21′47.47″N 138°13′1.88″E
- Operator: Ueda Electric Railway
- Line: ■ Bessho Line
- Distance: 6.1 km from Ueda
- Platforms: 2 side platforms
- Tracks: 2

Construction
- Structure type: Ground level
- Accessible: None

Other information
- Status: Staffed
- Station code: BE09
- Website: Official website

History
- Opened: 17 June 1921

Passengers
- FY2015: 159 daily

Services
| Preceding station | Ueda Electric Railway | Following station |
|---|---|---|
| Nakashioda BE10 towards Bessho-Onsen | Bessho Line | Daigakumae BE08 towards Ueda |
Location
- Location within Nagano Prefecture Location within Japan

Shimonogō Station (下之郷駅, Shimonogō-eki) is a railway station in the city of Ueda, Nagano, Japan, operated by the private railway operating company Ueda Electric Railway.

== Lines ==
Shimonogō Station is served by the Bessho Line and is 6.1 kilometers from the terminus of the line at Ueda Station.

== Station layout ==
The station consists of two ground-level side platforms serving two tracks connected by a level crossing. The platforms are not numbered. The station is one of the few stations on the line which is staffed.

=== Platforms ===
| “south” | ■ Ueda Electric Railway Bessho Line | for Shiodamachi and Bessho-Onsen |
| “north” | ■ Ueda Electric Railway Bessho Line | for Ueda |

== History ==
The station opened on 17 June 1921. It was also the terminus for the now-discontinued Ueda—Maruko Electric Railways’s Nishi-Maruko Line from 1926 to 1963.

Station numbering was introduced in August 2016 with Shimonogō being assigned station number BE09.

== Passenger statistics ==
In fiscal 2015, the station was used by an average of 159 passengers daily (boarding passengers only).

== Surrounding area ==
- Ueda Kotsu head office
- Higashi-Shioda Post Office
- Ikushimatarushima Jinja

== See also ==
- List of railway stations in Japan
