= Taku Inafuku =

Japanese footballer

Personal information
- Date of birth: 2 May 2002 (age 24)
- Place of birth: Ueda, Nagano, Japan
- Height: 1.67 m (5 ft 6 in)
- Position: Midfielder

Team information
- Current team: Matsumoto Yamaga
- Number: 34

Youth career
- –2018: Artista Tomi
- 2018–2021: Matsumoto Yamaga

Senior career*
Years	Team	Apps	(Gls)
2021–	Matsumoto Yamaga	19	(0)
2024	→ Veertien Mie (loan)	11	(2)
- * Club domestic league appearances and goals as of 1 January 2026

Taku Inafuku (稲福 卓, Inafuku Taku; born 2 May 2002) is a Japanese footballer currently playing as a midfielder for Matsumoto Yamaga.

== Career statistics ==
=== Club ===
As of 6 December 2021.

Club	Season	League			National Cup		League Cup		Other		Total	
Club	Season	Division	Apps	Goals	Apps	Goals	Apps	Goals	Apps	Goals	Apps	Goals
Matsumoto Yamaga	2021	J2 League	1	0	0	0	0	0	0	0	1	0
Career total			1	0	0	0	0	0	0	0	1	0
