= Maita Station (Nagano) =

Railway station in Ueda, Nagano Prefecture, Japan

Maita Station 舞田駅
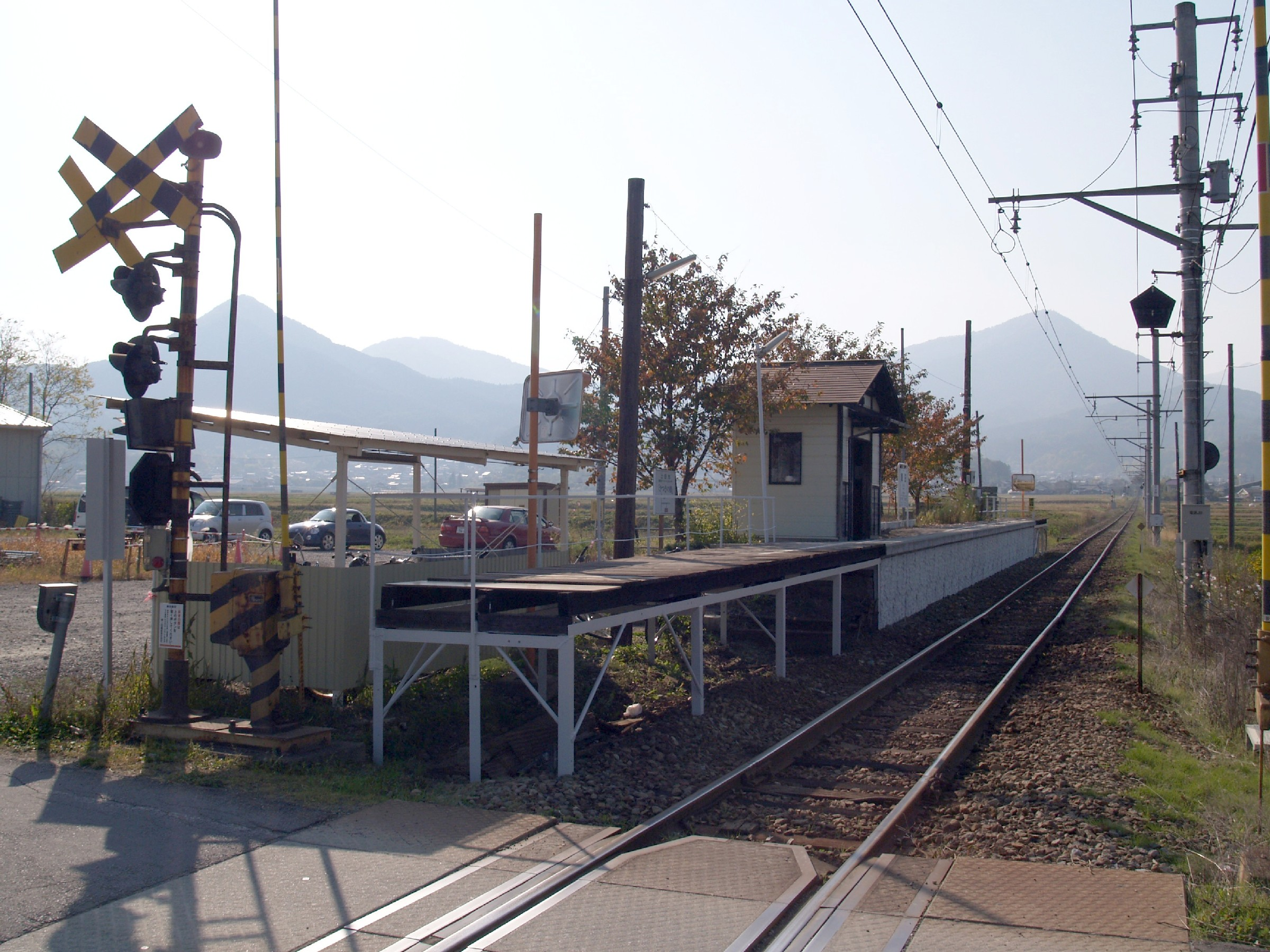
- Maita Station in October 2009

General information
- Location: Maita, Ueda-shi, Nagano-ken 386-1326; Japan
- Coordinates: 36°21′35.1″N 138°10′59.37″E
- Operator: Ueda Electric Railway
- Line: ■ Bessho Line
- Distance: 9.4 km from Ueda
- Platforms: 1 side platform
- Tracks: 1

Construction
- Structure type: Ground level

Other information
- Status: Unstaffed
- Station code: BE13
- Website: Official website

History
- Opened: 17 June 1921

Passengers
- FY2015: 33 daily

Services
Preceding station	Ueda Electric Railway	Following station
Yagisawa BE14 towards Bessho-Onsen	Bessho Line	Nakano BE12 towards Ueda
Location
- Location within Nagano Prefecture Location within Japan

Maita Station (舞田駅, Maita-eki) is a railway station in the city of Ueda, Nagano, Japan, operated by the private railway operating company Ueda Electric Railway.

== Lines ==
Maita Station is served by the Bessho Line and is 9.4 kilometers from the terminus of the line at Ueda Station.

== Station layout ==
The station consists of one ground-level side platform serving a single bi-directional track. The station is not attended.

== History ==
The station opened on 17 June 1921.

Station numbering was introduced in August 2016 with Maita being assigned station number BE13.

== Passenger statistics ==
In fiscal 2015, the station was used by an average of 33 passengers daily (boarding passengers only).

== Surrounding area ==
- Sakura International High School

== See also ==
- List of railway stations in Japan
