= Maita Station =

Maita Station may refer to:

- Maita Station (Kanagawa) in Yokohama, Japan
- Maita Station (Nagano) in Ueda, Nagano, Japan
