= Shiodamachi Station =

Railway station in Ueda, Nagano Prefecture, Japan

Shiodamachi Station 塩田町駅
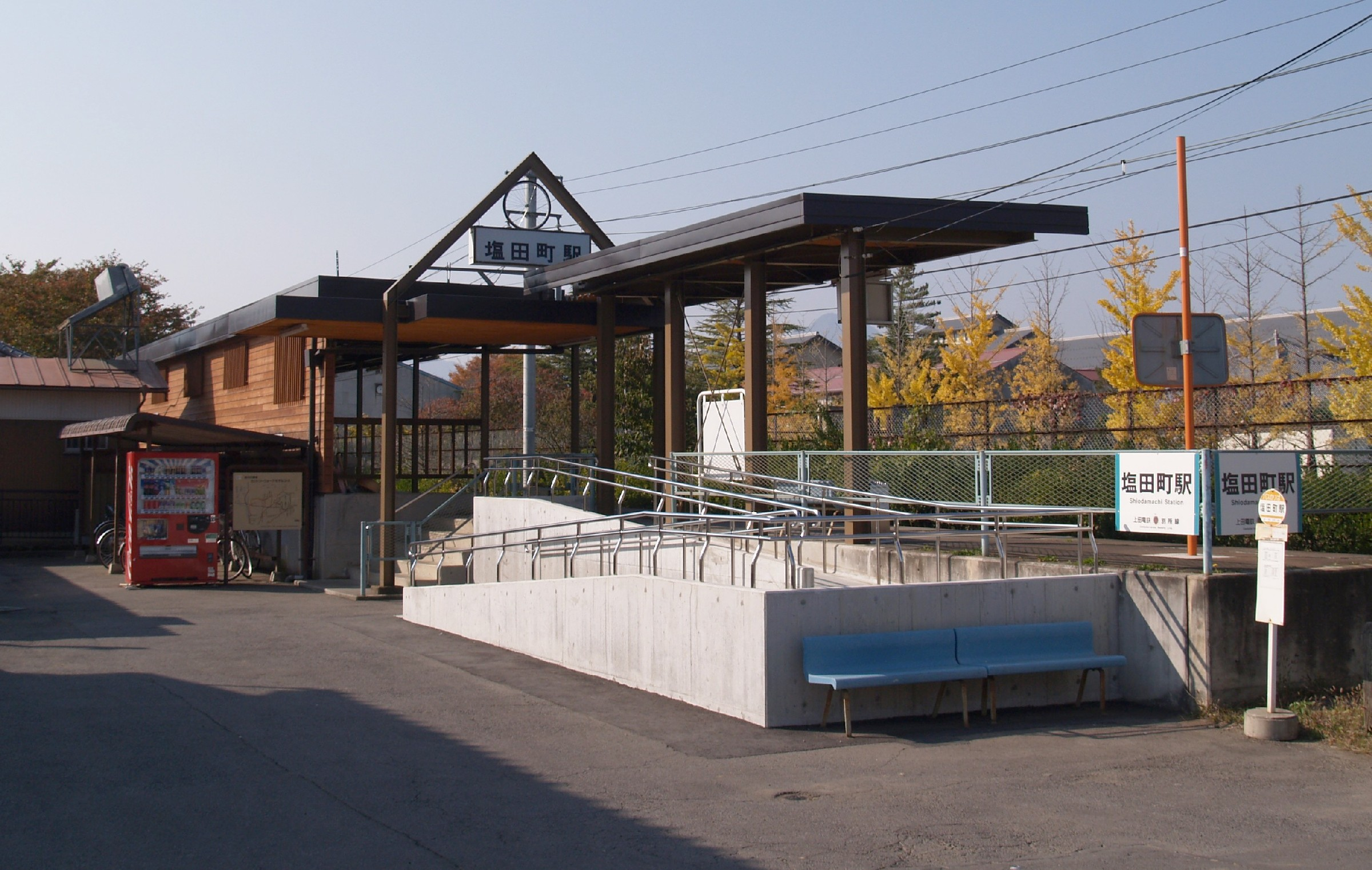
- Shiodamachi Station in October 2009

General information
- Location: 4-2 Nakano-Kamata, Ueda-shi, Nagano-ken 386-1325; Japan
- Coordinates: 36°21′39.47″N 138°11′55.31″E
- Operator: Ueda Electric Railway
- Line: ■ Bessho Line
- Distance: 8.0 km from Ueda
- Platforms: 1 side platform
- Tracks: 1

Construction
- Structure type: Ground level
- Accessible: yes

Other information
- Status: Unstaffed
- Station code: BE11
- Website: Official website

History
- Opened: 17 June 1921
- Former names: Kamihongō Station (to 1965)

Passengers
- FY2015: 157 daily

Services
Preceding station	Ueda Electric Railway	Following station
Nakano BE12 towards Bessho-Onsen	Bessho Line	Nakashioda BE10 towards Ueda
Location
- Location within Nagano Prefecture Location within Japan

Shiodamachi Station (塩田町駅, Shiodamachi-eki) is a railway station in the city of Ueda, Nagano, Japan, operated by the private railway operating company Ueda Electric Railway.

== Lines ==
Shiodamachi Station is served by the Bessho Line and is 8.0 kilometers from the terminus of the line at Ueda Station.

== Station layout ==
The station consists of one ground-level side platform serving a single bi-directional track. The station is not attended.

== History ==
The station opened on 17 June 1921 as Kamihongō Station (上本郷駅). It was renamed to its present name in 1965.

Station numbering was introduced in August 2016 with Shiodamachi being assigned station number BE11.

== Passenger statistics ==
In fiscal 2015, the station was used by an average of 157 passengers daily (boarding passengers only).

== Surrounding area ==
- Ueda Bus Shiodamachi terminal
- Kamihongō Post Office
- Shioda Elementary School
- Shioda Middle School

== See also ==
- List of railway stations in Japan
