= Ueda Electric Railway Bessho Line =

Railway line in Nagano, Japan

Uedadentetsu Bessho Line

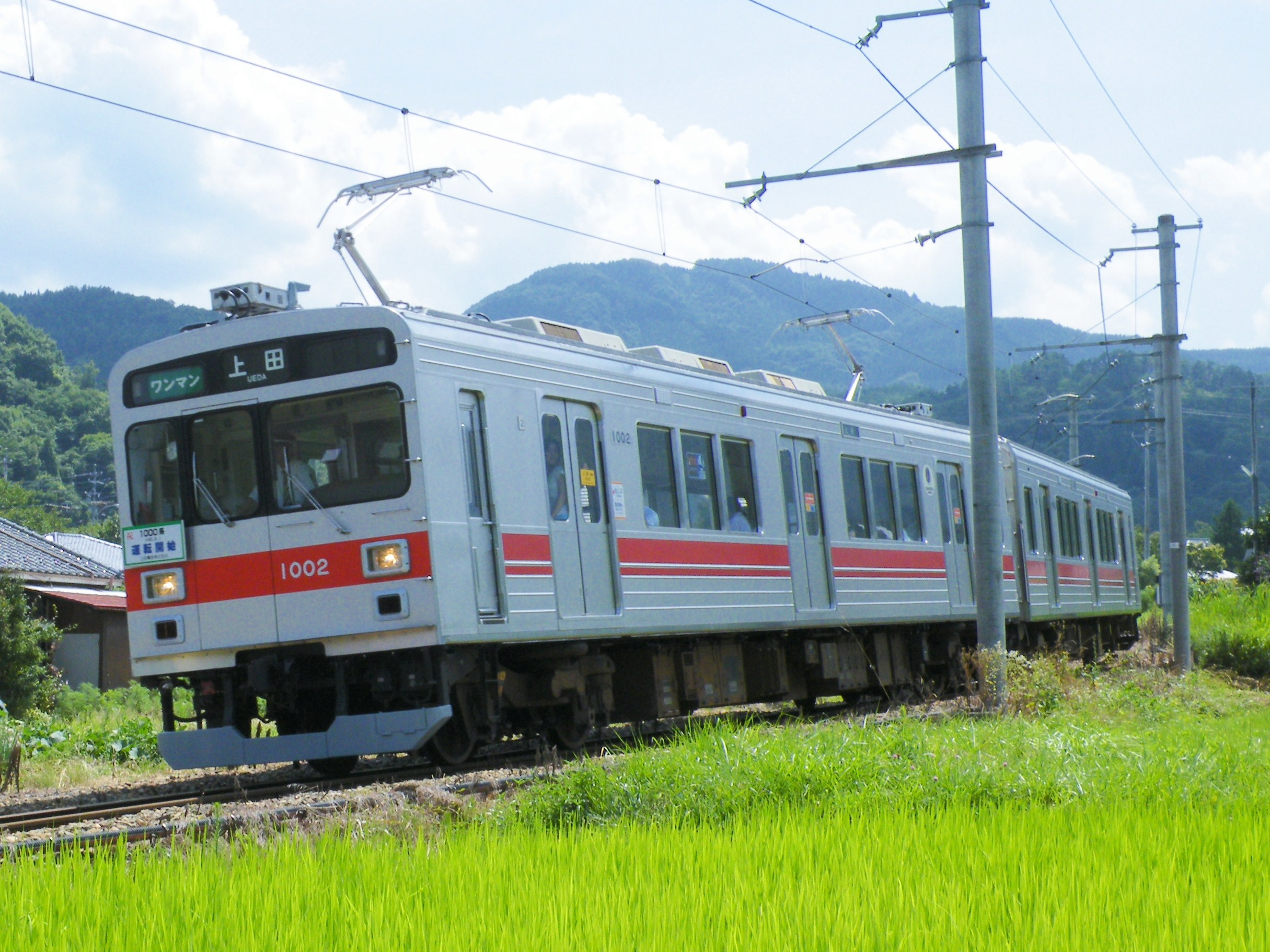
- An Uedadentetsu 1000 series train in August 2008

Overview
- Owner: Uedadentetsu
- Locale: Ueda, Nagano
- Termini: Ueda; Bessho-Onsen
- Stations: 15

History
- Opened: 1921

Technical
- Line length: 11.6 km (7.2 mi)
- Number of tracks: Single
- Track gauge: 1,067 mm (3 ft 6 in)
- Minimum radius: 120 m
- Electrification: 1,500 V DC, overhead catenary
- Operating speed: 65 km/h (40 mph)
Route map

The Bessho Line (別所線, Bessho-sen) is an 11.6 km (7.2 mi) Japanese railway line in Ueda, Nagano, Japan, operated by the private railway operator Uedadentetsu (上田電鉄; lit. 'Ueda Electric Railway'). It connects Ueda and Bessho-Onsen stations. This is currently the only railway line Ueda Dentetsu operates. Although the company is the root of its holding company, Ueda Kōtsū (上田交通; "Ueda Transport"), the group now mainly operates resort amusement facilities and bus lines. Ueda Kōtsū is owned by Tokyu Corporation. The railway line lacked funds to upgrade the infrastructure to meet the new safety standards, and separated to become the present company.

== Stations ==
No.	Name	Japanese	Distance (km)	Date opened
BE01	Ueda	上田	0.0	15 August 1923
BE02	Shiroshita	城下	0.8	17 June 1921
BE03	Miyoshichō	三好町	1.5	17 June 1921
BE04	Akasakaue	赤坂上	2.2	21 September 1932
BE05	Uedahara	上田原	2.9	17 June 1921
BE06	Terashita	寺下	3.8	17 June 1921
BE07	Kabatake	神畑	4.5	17 June 1921
BE08	Daigakumae	大学前	5.2	17 June 1921
BE09	Shimonogō	下之郷	6.1	17 June 1921
BE10	Nakashioda	中塩田	7.4	17 June 1921
BE11	Shiodamachi	塩田町	8.0	14 July 1934
BE12	Nakano	中野	8.5	17 June 1921
BE13	Maita	舞田	9.4	17 June 1921
BE14	Yagisawa	八木沢	10.1	17 June 1921
BE15	Bessho-Onsen	別所温泉	11.6	17 June 1921

== Rolling stock ==
As of 1 April 2015, the fleet of trains operated on the line is as follows.

- 1000 series 2-car EMUs x4 (former Tokyu 1000 series, since 2008)
- 6000 series 2-car EMU x1 (former Tokyu 1000 series, since 28 March 2015)
- 7200 series 2-car EMU x1 (former Tokyu 7200 series, since 29 March 1998)
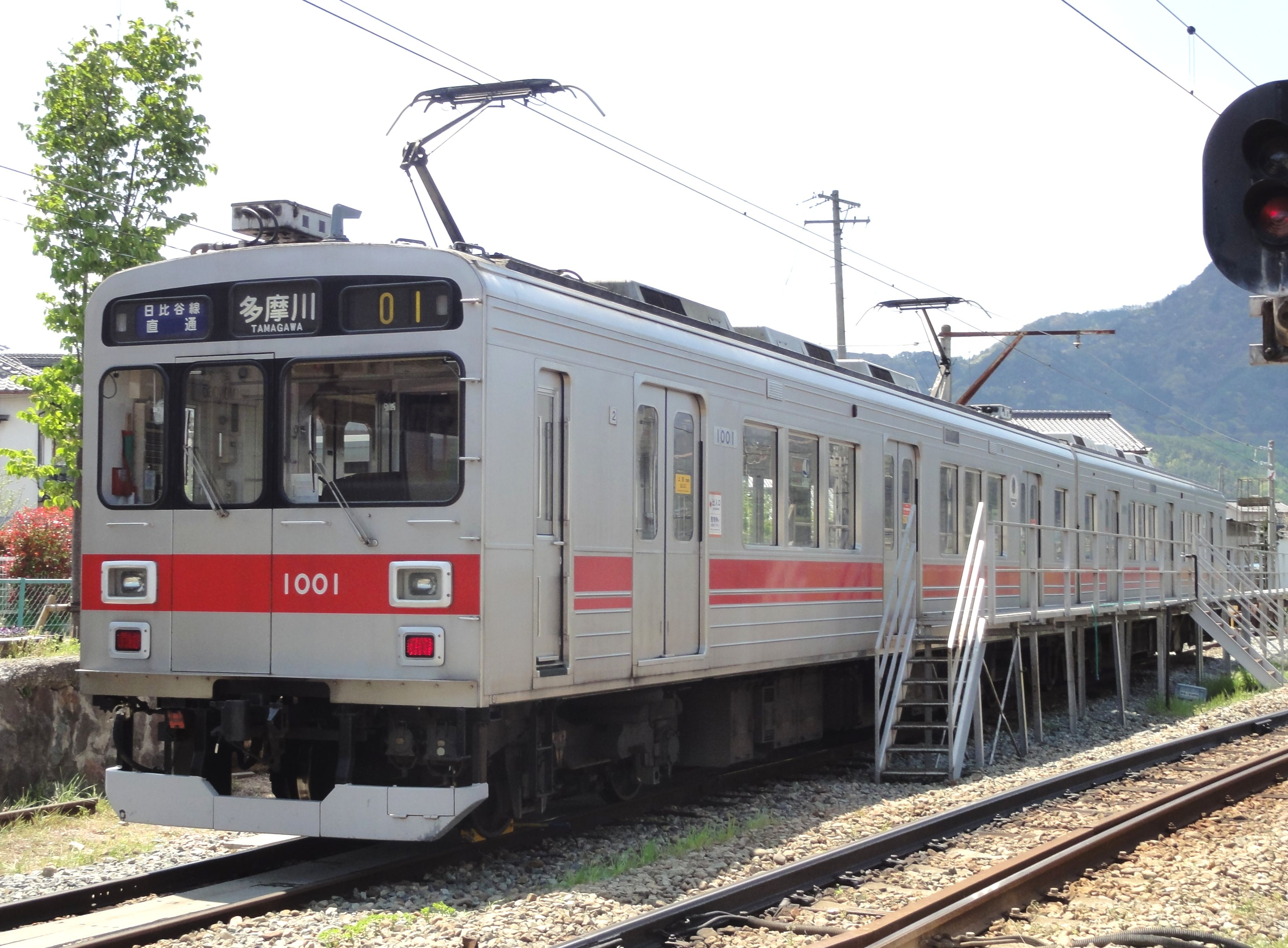
1000 series set 1001 in May 2012. Front designation/service signs shown are from former Tokyu Toyoko line service with through-running to the Tokyo Metro Hibiya Line.

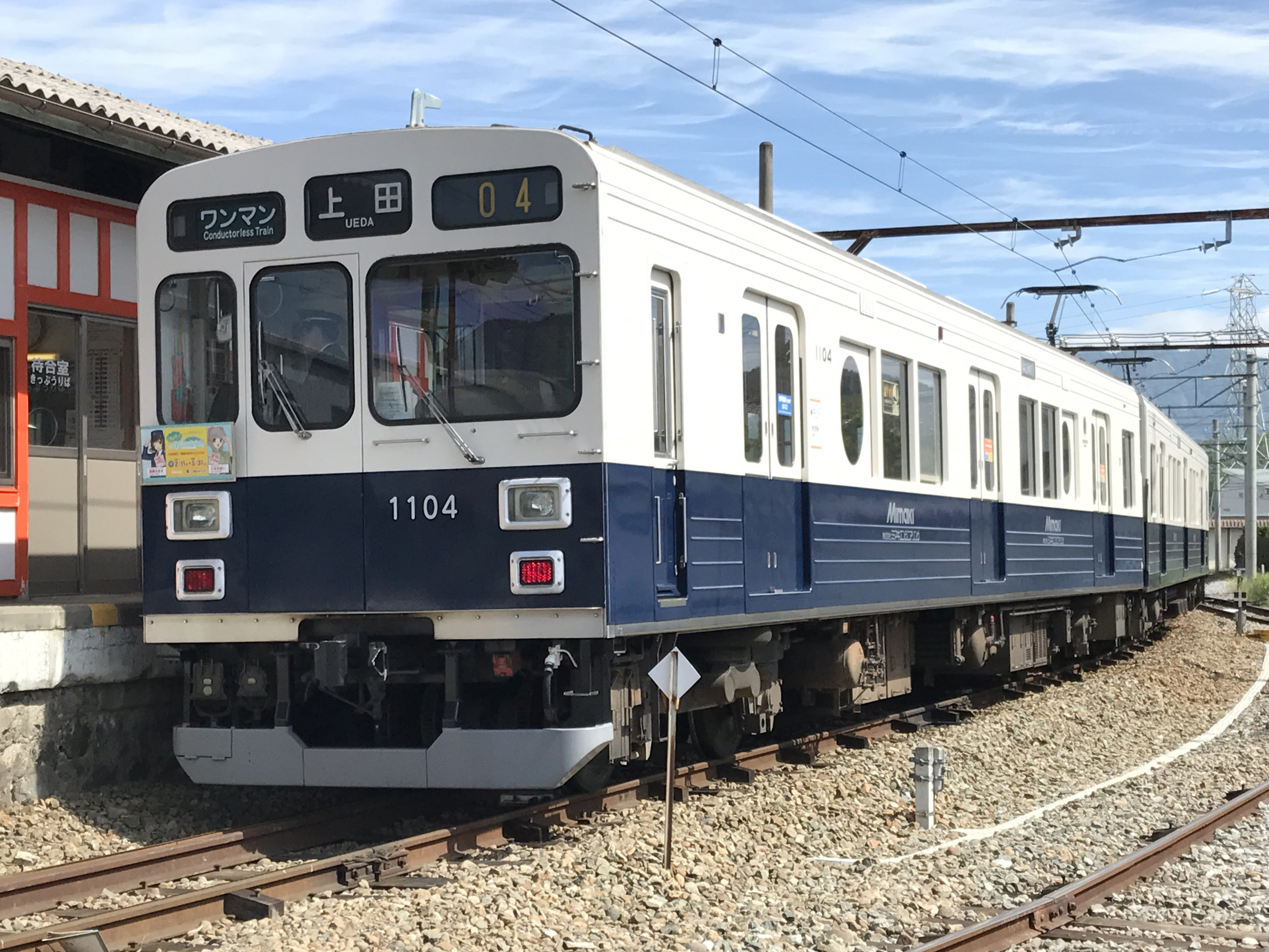
1000 series set 1004 in retro-style blue and cream livery in June 2017

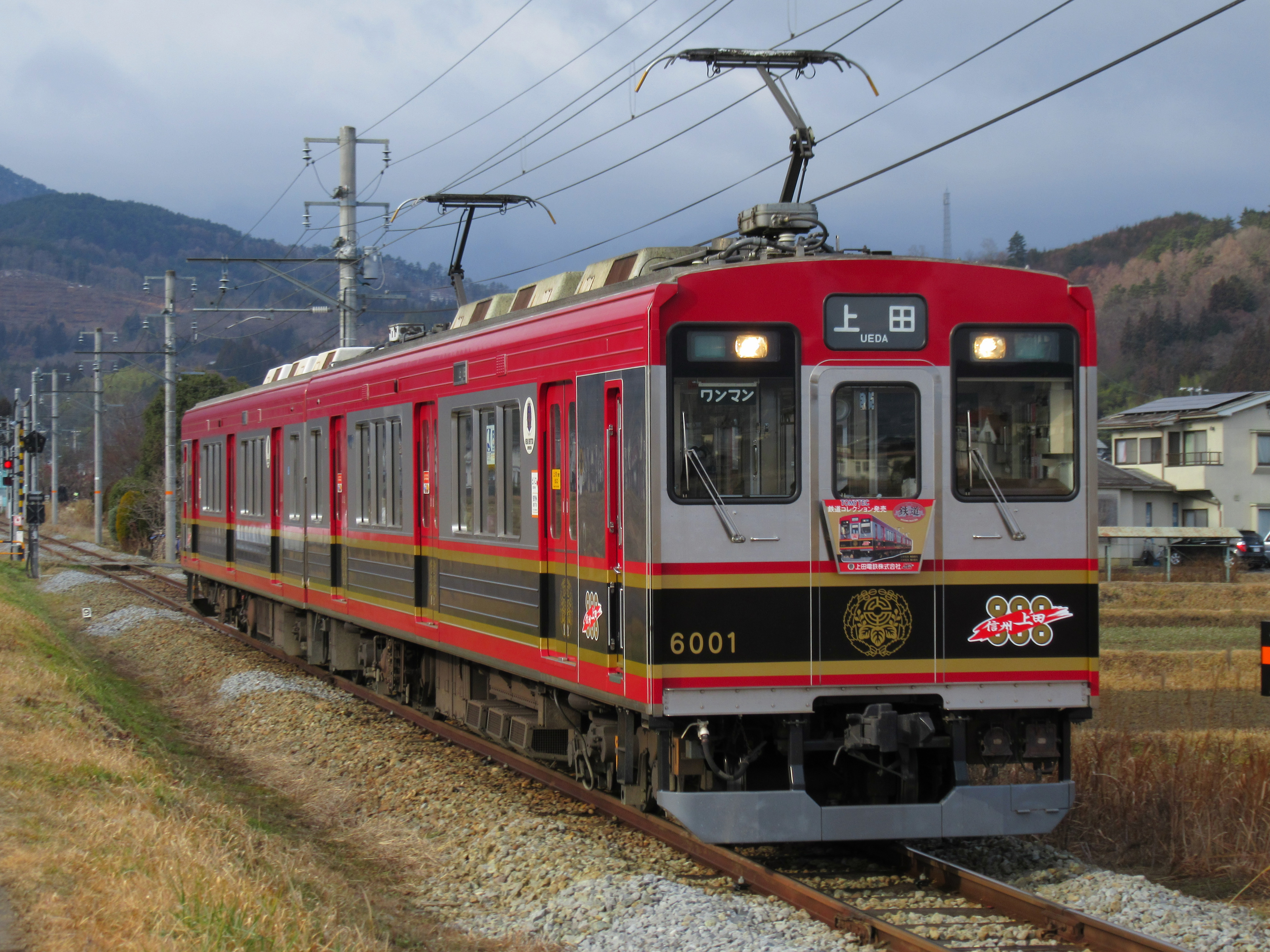
6000 series set 6001 in January 2017

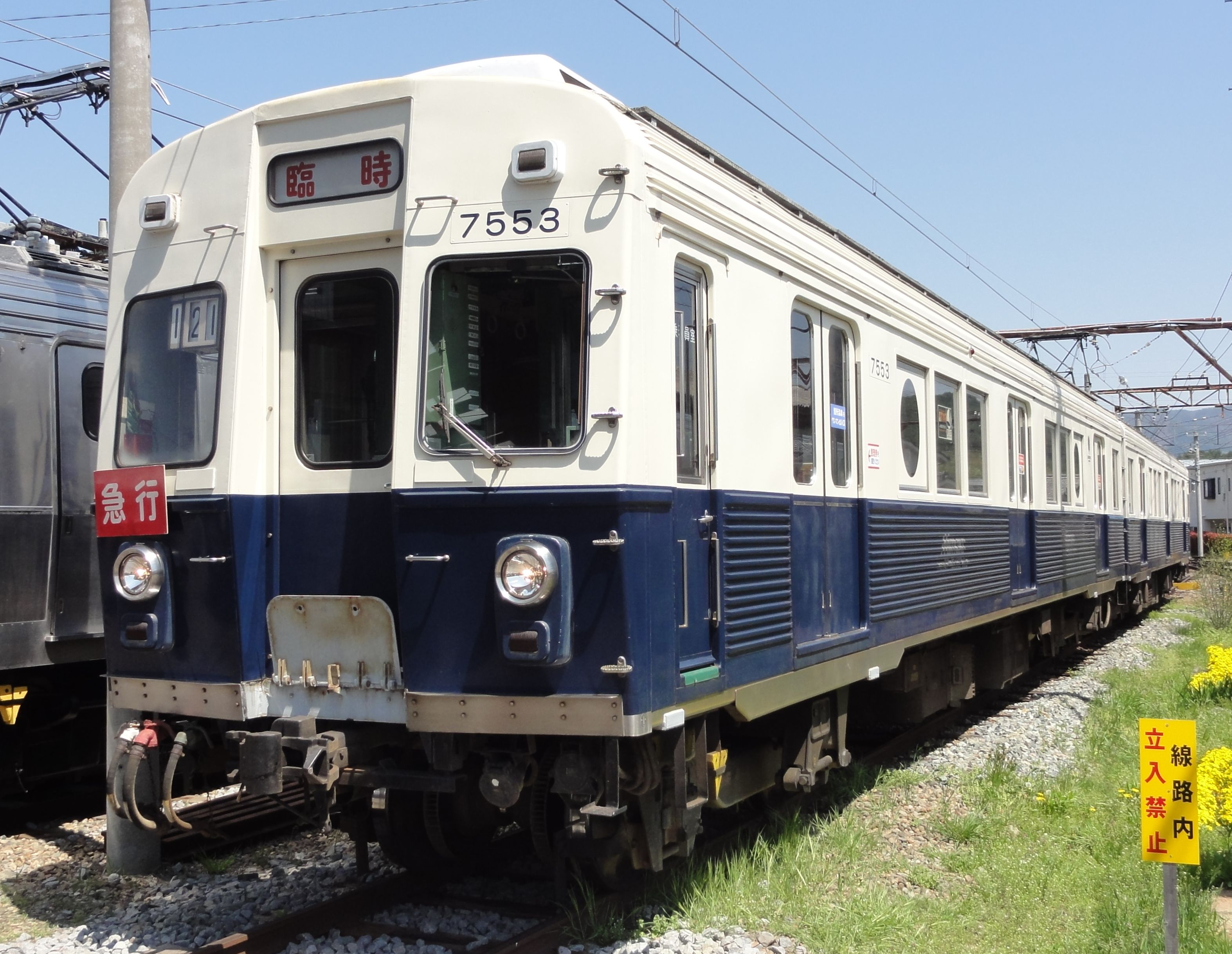
7200 series in May 2012

=== 1000 series ===
Eight former Tokyu 1000 series EMU end cars were resold to Uedadentetsu, and reformed as four two-car 1000 series sets.

==== Formations ====
Designation	Mc	Tc
Numbering	DeHa 100x	KuHa 110x

=== 6000 series ===
In 2015, two former Tokyu Toyoko Line 1000 series intermediate cars (DeHa 1255 and DeHa 1305) were resold to Uedadentetsu, which were reformed as a two-car 6000 series set with the addition of new cab ends.

==== Formation ====
Designation	Mc	Tc
Numbering	DeHa 6001x	KuHa 6101x

==== Car identities ====
The former identities of the fleet are as shown below.

Set No.	Car No.	Tokyu numbering
1001	DeHa 1001	DeHa 1315
1001	KuHa 1101	KuHa 1015
1002	DeHa 1002	DeHa 1318
1002	KuHa 1102	KuHa 1018
1003	DeHa 1003	DeHa 1314
1003	KuHa 1103	KuHa 1014
1004	DeHa 1004	DeHa 1316
1004	KuHa 1104	KuHa 1016
6001	DeHa 6001	DeHa 1305
6001	KuHa 6101	DeHa 1255

== History ==
The first section of the line opened on 17 June 1921, using a 600 V DC overhead power supply. The line voltage was raised to 1,500 V DC from 1 October 1986. Wanman driver-only operation commenced on the line from 3 October 2005.

In 2009, the company sold out affiliated companies that Joden Bus and Joden Taxi to Jay Will Partners.

From 1 April 2016, station numbering was introduced on the line, with stations numbered from "BE01" (Ueda) to "BE15" (Bessho-Onsen).

== See also ==
- List of railway companies in Japan
- List of railway lines in Japan
- Ueda Bus (This company had been a subsidiary until 2009)
