= Ueda, Nagano =

Ueda 上田市
- City
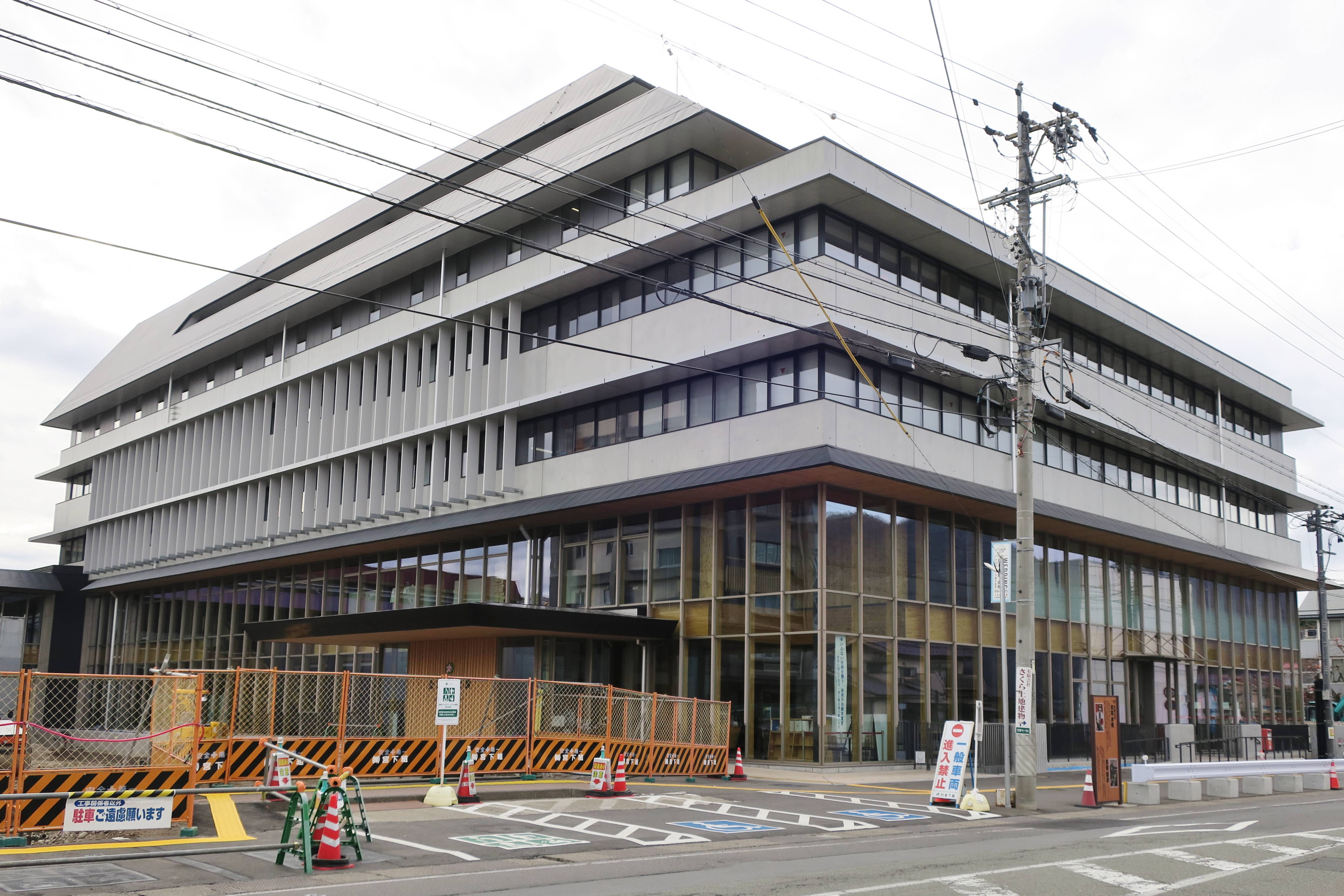
- Ueda City Hall

- Flag Emblem

- Location of Ueda in Nagano Prefecture

- Coordinates: 36°24′6.8″N 138°14′56.7″E
- Country: Japan
- Region: Chūbu (Kōshin'etsu)
- Prefecture: Nagano

Government
  - Mayor: Tatsuya Saitō (ja:斎藤達也) - from April 2026

Area
  - Total: 552.04 km^{2} (213.14 sq mi)

Population (April 2019)
  - Total: 157,480
  - Density: 285.27/km^{2} (738.84/sq mi)
- Time zone: UTC+9 (Japan Standard Time)
- Phone number: 0268-22-4100
- Address: 1-11-16 Ote, Ueda-shi, Nagano-ken 386-8601
- Climate: Cfa/Dfa
- Website: Official website
- Symbols
- Flower: Azalea
- Tree: Taxus cuspidata

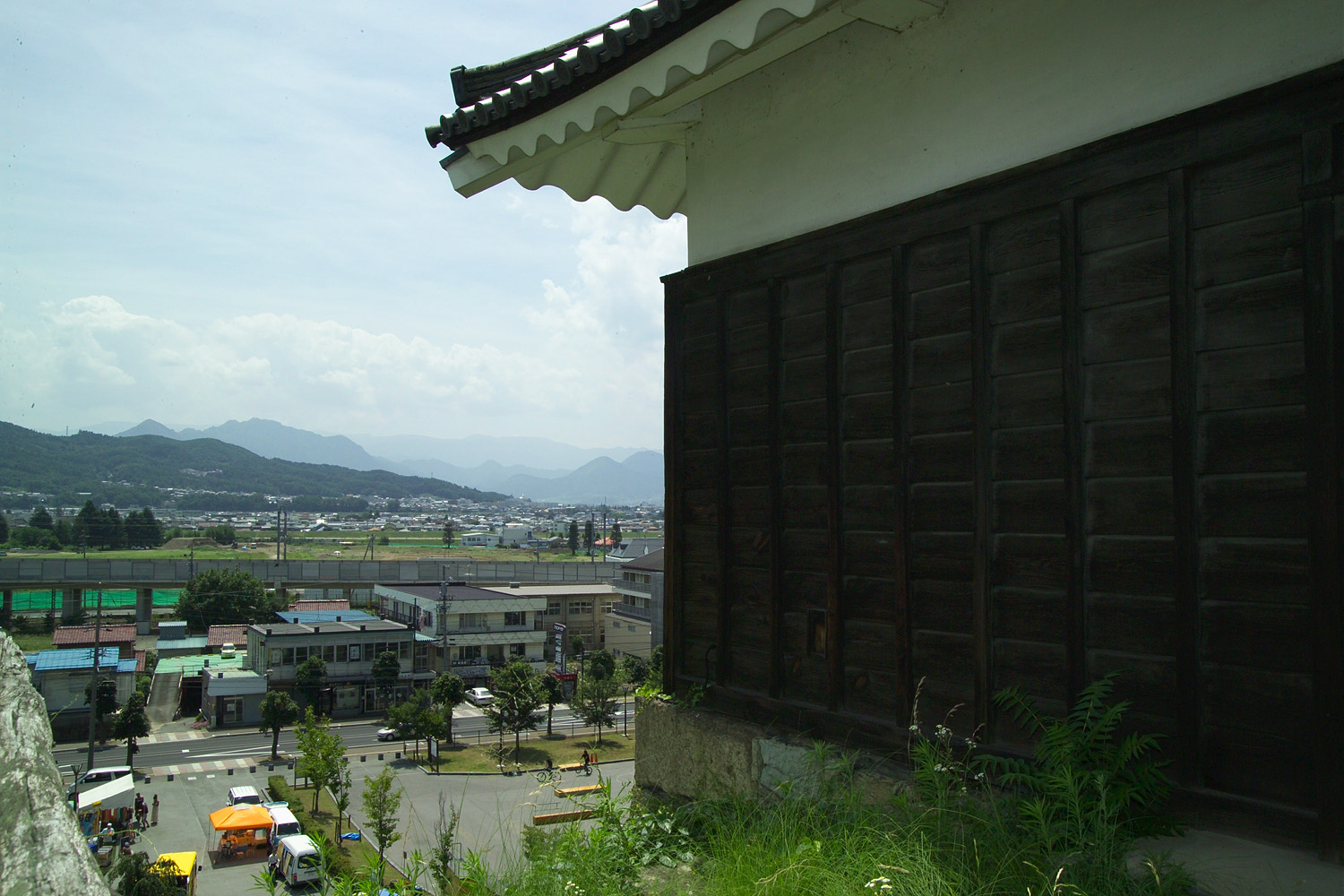
The city as viewed from the West Turret of Ueda Castle (foreground)

Ueda (上田市, Ueda-shi; Japanese pronunciation: [ɯ̈̀.é̞.dä́(.ɕì)]) is a city located in Nagano Prefecture, Japan. As of 1 April 2019, the city had an estimated population of 157,480 in 67,783 households, and a population density of 290 persons per km^{2}. The total area of the city is 552.04 square kilometres (213.14 sq mi), which makes it the fifth largest city in Nagano Prefecture in terms of area.

== Geography ==
Ueda is located in central Nagano Prefecture, some 40 kilometers from the prefectural capital of Nagano City and 190 kilometers from Tokyo. The Chikuma River divides the city into two parts.

=== Surrounding municipalities ===
- Gunma Prefecture
  - Tsumagoi
- Nagano Prefecture
  - Aoki
  - Chikuhoku
  - Chikuma
  - Matsumoto
  - Nagano
  - Nagawa
  - Suzaka
  - Tōmi

== Climate ==
The city has a climate characterized by hot and humid summers, and relatively mild winters (Köppen climate classification Cwa). The average annual temperature in Ueda is 12.0 °C (53.6 °F). The average annual rainfall is 906.2 mm (35.68 in) with September as the wettest month. The temperatures are highest on average in August, at around 24.9 °C (76.8 °F), and lowest in January, at around −0.5 °C (31.1 °F).

Climate data for Ueda (1991–2020 normals, extremes 1976–present)
Month	Jan	Feb	Mar	Apr	May	Jun	Jul	Aug	Sep	Oct	Nov	Dec	Year
Record high °C (°F)	15.2 (59.4)	22.1 (71.8)	29.6 (85.3)	32.0 (89.6)	34.0 (93.2)	37.2 (99.0)	38.8 (101.8)	39.0 (102.2)	37.4 (99.3)	31.3 (88.3)	26.4 (79.5)	24.0 (75.2)	39.0 (102.2)
Mean daily maximum °C (°F)	5.2 (41.4)	6.9 (44.4)	11.5 (52.7)	18.2 (64.8)	23.5 (74.3)	26.3 (79.3)	30.0 (86.0)	31.3 (88.3)	26.2 (79.2)	20.0 (68.0)	14.2 (57.6)	8.2 (46.8)	18.5 (65.3)
Daily mean °C (°F)	−0.5 (31.1)	0.5 (32.9)	4.4 (39.9)	10.6 (51.1)	16.2 (61.2)	20.1 (68.2)	23.9 (75.0)	24.9 (76.8)	20.5 (68.9)	13.9 (57.0)	7.6 (45.7)	2.1 (35.8)	12.0 (53.6)
Mean daily minimum °C (°F)	−5.0 (23.0)	−4.4 (24.1)	−1.1 (30.0)	4.3 (39.7)	10.1 (50.2)	15.4 (59.7)	19.7 (67.5)	20.5 (68.9)	16.3 (61.3)	9.5 (49.1)	2.5 (36.5)	−2.4 (27.7)	7.1 (44.8)
Record low °C (°F)	−14.4 (6.1)	−13.4 (7.9)	−10.7 (12.7)	−6.0 (21.2)	0.3 (32.5)	5.2 (41.4)	11.3 (52.3)	11.6 (52.9)	5.3 (41.5)	−1.4 (29.5)	−5.5 (22.1)	−12.0 (10.4)	−14.4 (6.1)
Average precipitation mm (inches)	29.3 (1.15)	28.7 (1.13)	54.0 (2.13)	58.6 (2.31)	77.0 (3.03)	102.2 (4.02)	135.6 (5.34)	103.5 (4.07)	134.1 (5.28)	110.8 (4.36)	44.0 (1.73)	23.9 (0.94)	906.2 (35.68)
Average precipitation days (≥ 1.0 mm)	4.7	5.3	7.7	7.7	8.5	10.5	13.0	9.7	9.6	8.0	5.5	5.0	95.0
Mean monthly sunshine hours	184.3	186.7	203.7	211.3	218.8	165.4	174.2	204.3	156.6	164.2	172.4	180.0	2,221.9
Source: Japan Meteorological Agency (1991–2020 normals, extremes 1976–present)

Climate data for Sugadaira, Ueda (1991–2020 normals, extremes 1978–present)
Month	Jan	Feb	Mar	Apr	May	Jun	Jul	Aug	Sep	Oct	Nov	Dec	Year
Record high °C (°F)	10.7 (51.3)	13.9 (57.0)	19.1 (66.4)	23.8 (74.8)	27.9 (82.2)	28.9 (84.0)	30.3 (86.5)	30.4 (86.7)	29.4 (84.9)	24.2 (75.6)	21.2 (70.2)	15.7 (60.3)	30.4 (86.7)
Mean daily maximum °C (°F)	−1.5 (29.3)	−0.5 (31.1)	3.5 (38.3)	10.7 (51.3)	16.8 (62.2)	19.9 (67.8)	23.7 (74.7)	24.7 (76.5)	20.0 (68.0)	14.0 (57.2)	8.3 (46.9)	1.8 (35.2)	11.8 (53.2)
Daily mean °C (°F)	−6.2 (20.8)	−5.6 (21.9)	−1.8 (28.8)	4.8 (40.6)	10.7 (51.3)	14.7 (58.5)	18.8 (65.8)	19.5 (67.1)	15.3 (59.5)	8.9 (48.0)	3.0 (37.4)	−3.0 (26.6)	6.6 (43.9)
Mean daily minimum °C (°F)	−13.0 (8.6)	−12.6 (9.3)	−7.9 (17.8)	−1.3 (29.7)	4.4 (39.9)	9.8 (49.6)	14.8 (58.6)	15.3 (59.5)	11.2 (52.2)	4.1 (39.4)	−2.4 (27.7)	−8.7 (16.3)	1.1 (34.0)
Record low °C (°F)	−29.0 (−20.2)	−29.2 (−20.6)	−22.8 (−9.0)	−17.8 (0.0)	−5.3 (22.5)	−1.9 (28.6)	6.1 (43.0)	5.8 (42.4)	−1.0 (30.2)	−8.6 (16.5)	−18.3 (−0.9)	−26.4 (−15.5)	−29.2 (−20.6)
Average precipitation mm (inches)	78.0 (3.07)	68.7 (2.70)	80.8 (3.18)	79.7 (3.14)	93.9 (3.70)	117.7 (4.63)	161.9 (6.37)	119.4 (4.70)	151.6 (5.97)	129.8 (5.11)	64.9 (2.56)	72.0 (2.83)	1,220.5 (48.05)
Average snowfall cm (inches)	192 (76)	153 (60)	136 (54)	35 (14)	0 (0)	0 (0)	0 (0)	0 (0)	0 (0)	0 (0)	12 (4.7)	121 (48)	648 (255)
Average precipitation days (≥ 1.0 mm)	14.5	12.1	12.7	10.7	10.3	12.1	14.0	10.8	11.1	10.5	9.6	12.9	141.1
Mean monthly sunshine hours	135.5	135.9	161.1	189.8	214.5	165.4	166.6	189.4	143.4	156.4	155.6	139.1	1,955.2
Source: Japan Meteorological Agency (1991–2020 normals, extremes 1978–present)

== History ==
Ueda is located in former Shinano Province and during the Nara period was the provincial capital. The ruins of the Shinano Kokubunji (provincial temple) are also located within Ueda. However, the provincial capital was shifted to Matsumoto during the early Heian period. During the Sengoku period, the area was the centre of the powerful Sanada clan. During the Edo period, Ueda was a castle town and headquarters of Ueda Domain under the Tokugawa shogunate. During the post-Meiji restoration cadastral reform of April 1, 1889, the modern town of Ueda was established. Ueda was elevated to city status on May 1, 1919. On March 6, 2006, Ueda absorbed the neighbouring towns of Maruko and Sanada, and the village of Takeshi (all from Chiisagata District).

== Demographics ==
Per Japanese census data, the population of Ueda peaked around the year 2000 and has declined since.

Historical population
Year	Pop.	±%
1960	138,170	—
1970	139,770	+1.2%
1980	151,804	+8.6%
1990	160,259	+5.6%
2000	166,568	+3.9%
2010	159,597	−4.2%
2020	154,055	−3.5%

== Government ==
Ueda has a mayor-council form of government with a directly elected mayor and a unicameral city legislature of 30 members. The city contributes four members to the Nagano Prefectural Assembly. In terms of national politics, Ueda is grouped with Komoro, Chikuma, Saku, Tōmi, Minamisaku District, Nagano, Kitasaku District, Nagano, Chiisagata District, Nagano and Hanishina District, Nagano to form Nagano 3rd District in the lower house of the National Diet.

== Economy ==
Ueda is a regional commercial centre with a mixed agricultural and light industrial economy. The main crops include rice, apples, grapes, cabbage and walnuts. The traditional industry of Ueda was sericulture and cotton-weaving. The city now hosts automobile components and electronics manufacturing.

== Education ==
=== University and colleges ===
- Nagano University
- Shinshu University
- Ueda Women's Junior College

=== Primary and secondary education ===
Ueda has 25 public elementary schools and 12 public middle schools operated by the city government and one public middle school shared with the town of Nagawa. The city has five public high schools operated by the Nagano prefectural Board of Education, and four private high schools.

- KLARK Memorial International High School (private)
- Maruko Syugakkan High School
- Sakura International High School (private)
- Tsukuba Kaisei High School (private)
- Ueda Chikuma High School
- Ueda Higashi High School
- Ueda High School
- Ueda Nishi High school (private)
- Ueda Someyaoka High School

== Transportation ==
=== Railway ===
- East Japan Railway Company - Hokuriku Shinkansen
  - Ueda
- Shinano Railway - Shinano Railway Line
  - Ōya – Shinano-Kokubunji – Ueda – Nishi-Ueda
- Ueda Electric Railway Bessho Line
  - Ueda – Shiroshita – Miyoshichō – Akasakaue – Uedahara – Terashita – Kabatake – Daigakumae – Shimonogō – Nakashioda – Shiodamachi – Nakano – Maita – Yagisawa – Bessho-Onsen

=== Highway ===
- Jōshin-etsu Expressway
- National Route 18
- National Route 141
- National Route 143
- National Route 144
- National Route 152
- National Route 254
- National Route 406

== External relations ==
Ueda maintains friendship and sister cities relationships with the following cities.

=== Friendship cities ===
- Broomfield, Colorado, United States (from 2001 with former Maruko)
- (Japan) Nerima, Tokyo (from 1994 with former Takeshi)
- Ningbo, China (from 1995 with Ueda)

=== Sister cities ===
- Davos, Graubünden, Switzerland (from 1976 with former Sanada)
- (Japan) Jōetsu, Niigata (from 1979 with Ueda)
- (Japan) Kamakura, Kanagawa (from 1979 with Ueda)
- (Japan) Kudoyama, Wakayama (from 1977 with former Sanada)
- (Japan) Toyooka, Hyōgo (from 1979 between Ueda and former town of Izushi)

=== Cities with emergency collaboration pacts ===
Ueda has entered into pacts with all the Japanese cities listed above and two more cities listed below for mutual collaboration in case of emergency.

- (Japan) Ageo, Saitama
- (Japan) Numazu, Shizuoka

== Local attractions ==
Anraku-ji

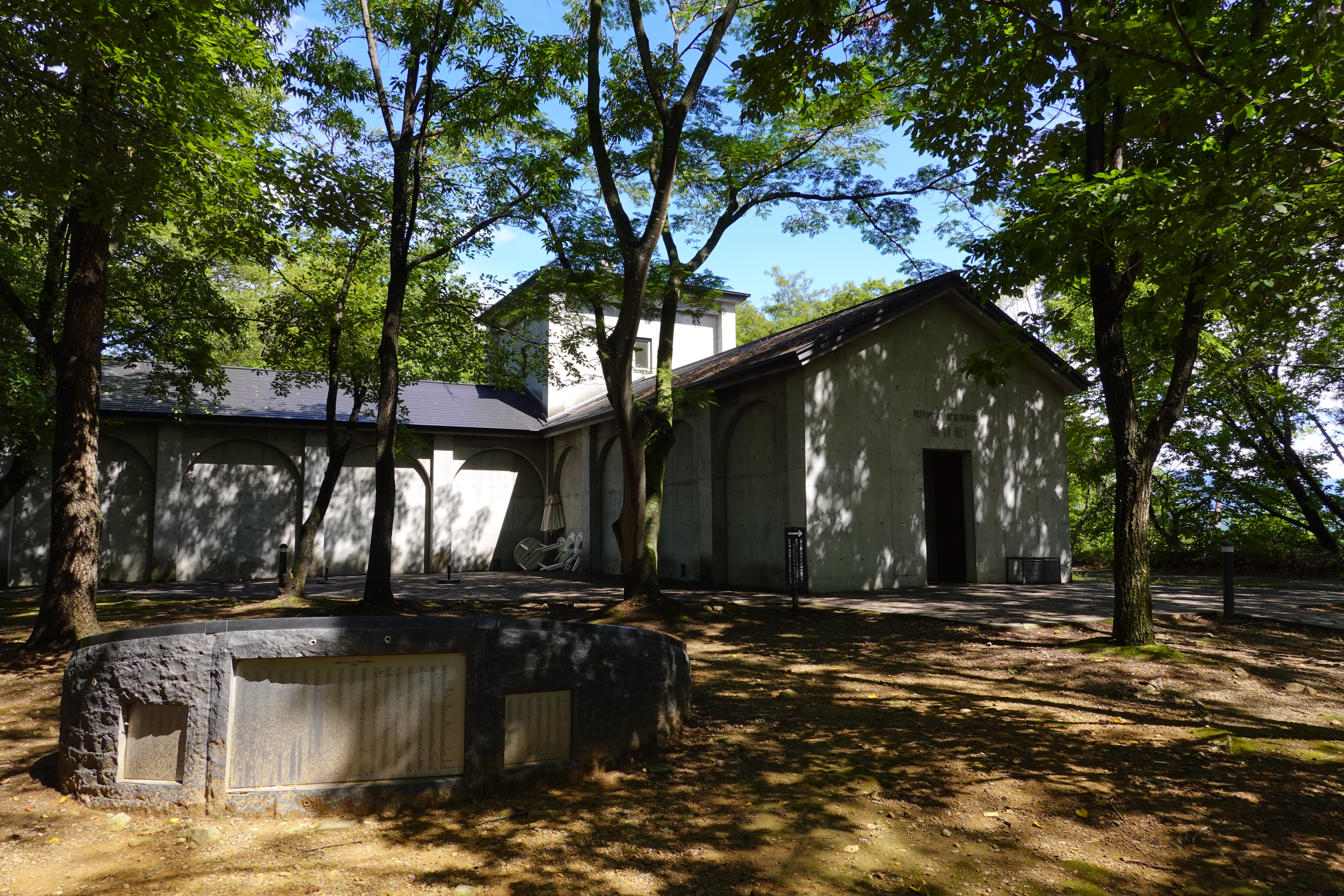
Mugonkan

- Anraku-ji in Bessho Onsen, Ueda has the only extant octagonal pagoda in Japan. The pagoda has been designated as National Treasure.
- Bessho Onsen
- Sanada-shi Yakata - A fortified residence of the Sanada clan, main bastion of the Sanada clan until Sanada Masayuki moved their base to Ueda Castle in 1585.
- Ueda Castle
- Utsukushigahara Open-Air Museum – An open-air museum with sculptures on the Utsukushigahara plateau, which opened in June 1981
- Mugonkan

== Notable residents ==
- Juri Miyazawa, actress
- Goichi Suda, video game designer, also known as Suda51
- Katsusaburō Yamagiwa (1863–1930), pathologist

== In popular culture ==
- Ueda is the primary setting for the 2009 anime film Summer Wars, directed by Mamoru Hosoda.
