= Anraku-ji (Ueda) =

Buddhist temple in Ueda, Nagano, Japan

Anraku-ji 安楽寺
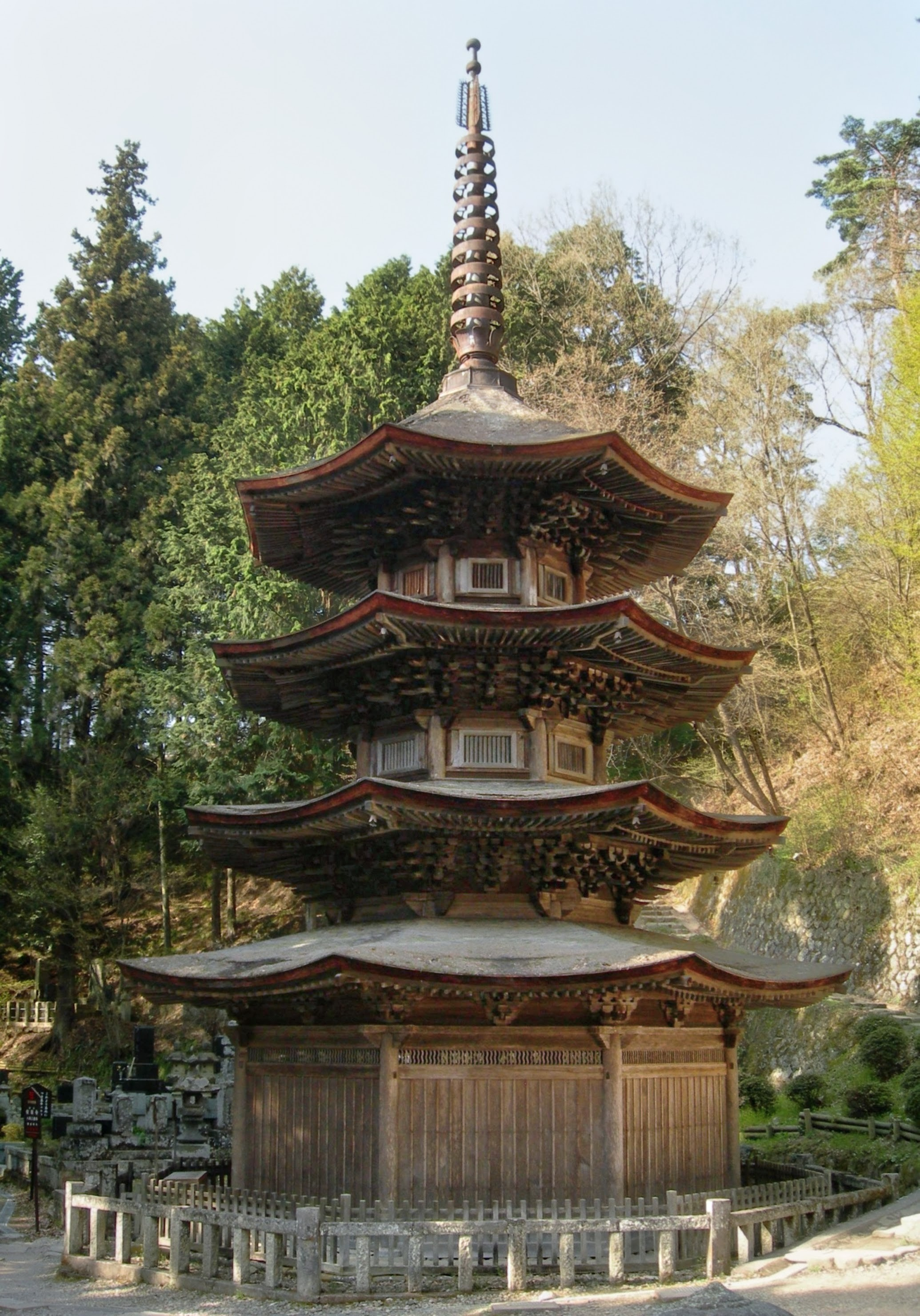
- Octagonal Three-storied Pagoda (National Treasure)

- Location within Nagano Prefecture Location within Japan

Religion
- Affiliation: Buddhist
- Deity: Sakyamuni
- Rite: Sōtō Zen
- Status: functional

Location
- Location: Bessho Onsen, Ueda, Nagano Prefecture
- Country: Japan
- Coordinates: 36°21′08″N 138°09′12″E

Architecture
- Completed: unknown (Tenpyō period?)

Website
- http://www.anrakuji.com

Anraku-ji (安楽寺) is a Buddhist temple of the Sōtō school in Bessho Onsen, Ueda, Nagano Prefecture, Japan. It is the oldest Zen temple in Nagano Prefecture. The main hall (hon-dō) has a thatched roof and enshrines an image of Sakyamuni flanked by Manjusri and Samantabhadra as principal object of worship. Anraku-ji is best known for having the only extant octagonal pagoda in Japan.

== History ==
The origin of the temple is uncertain. The temple claims variously to have been established in the Tenpyō era (729 - 749 AD) by Gyōki, or during the Tenchō era (824-834 AD) during the Heian period. During its early period, it belonged to the Ritsu sect. The temple is first mentioned in historical records during the Kamakura period, when it was converted to the Zen sect by a monk from Song China who came to Japan on the same ship as the famous Lanxi Daolong of Kencho-ji in Kamakura. By the mid-13th century, Anraku-ji was the center of learning in Shinano Province, educating many priests with the support of the Hōjō clan until that clan was overthrown in 1333.

== Buildings and cultural assets ==
=== Pagoda ===
The temple's three storied pagoda is the only extant octagonal pagoda in Japan. Built at the end of the Kamakura period in Zen style, its lowest roof is a mokoshi pent roof enclosure. Its roofs are covered with hinoki cypress shingles. The inside contains an octagonal Buddhist altar which together with the pagoda and a munafuda ridge tag with information on the building's construction has been designated as National Treasure in 1952.

=== Statues of Enin and Isen ===
Two wooden seated statues of priests made in 1329 by a carpenter named Hyobu have been designated as Important Cultural Properties: One depicts Enin, a Chinese priest who came to Japan with Shōkoku Isen to become the second abbot of Anraku-ji; the other is of the Zen priest Isen, who went to study in China in the mid-Kamakura period and returned in 1246 together with Rankei Doryū, founder of Kenchō-ji. Unlike later sculptures, both show a high degree of realism. They are enshrined in the Denpō-dō (伝芳堂) hall.

=== Kyōzō ===
The temple includes a Buddhist library after 1784. Built to store sutras copied by the priest Tetsugen purchased from Mampuku-ji, the building is 5.4 m (18 ft) square, plastered and has a copper roof. Inside, it contains an octagonal revolving sutra shelf (rinzō) said to have been designed by the Great Teacher Fu (傅大師, Fu Daishi). The building and rinzō have been designated as Cultural Assets of Ueda City.

=== Bell tower ===
Built in 1769 in a mix of Zen and Japanese style, the two-storey bell tower (shōrō) with a skirt like lower storey (hakamagoshi type) is one of the largest in the area. The original Edo period bell was used as scrap metal in World War II. The present bell was cast by Katori Masahiko in 1957.

=== Other ===
In 1693 important men of Shioda district decided to have Buddhas similar to those on the Shikoku 88-temple pilgrimage, so that they could acquire the same merit without going on a pilgrimage to Shikoku. They had statues made in Kyoto and distributed to various temples in Shioda. Out of 88 images, 7 are found at Anraku-ji. In addition, the temple owns a set of sixteen rakan (i.e. arhat) also from the Edo period.

A letter from Rankei Doryū to Shōkoku Isen written in classical Chinese showing the close relationship between the two is held by the temple:

Dear Brother Isen. I hear there has been trouble among priests during the summer training here in Kenchō-ji. I ask you to please come back as soon as possible for things are getting worse because of your absence. Let us discuss the problems face to face.

— Sincerely, Rankei

San-mon

Hondō

Zazendō

Main garden

== See also ==
- List of National Treasures of Japan (temples)
