= Ueda Women's Junior College =

Coordinates: 36°22′10.5″N 138°13′14.7″E

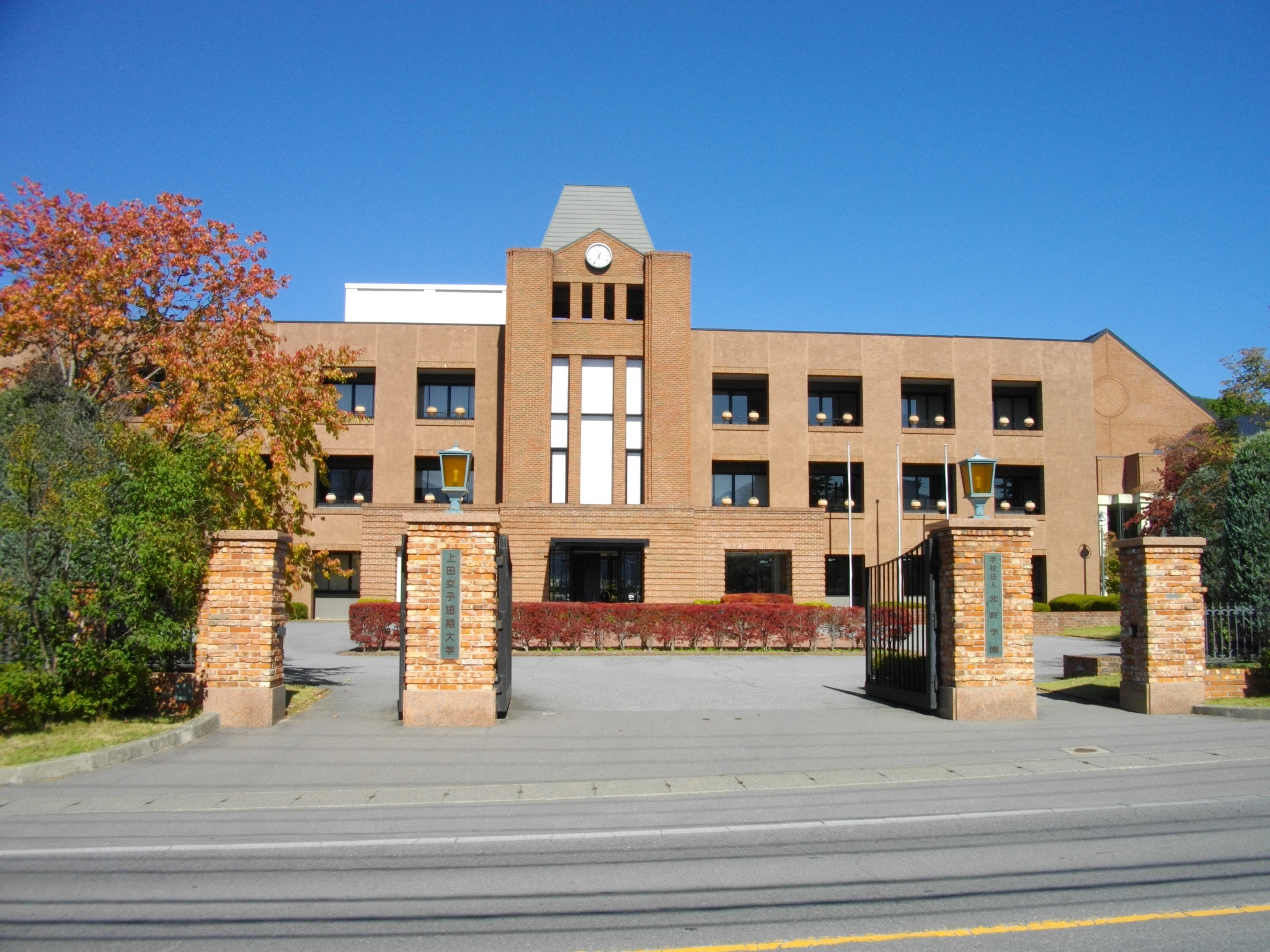
Ueda Women's Junior College

Ueda Women's Junior College (上田女子短期大学, Ueda joshi tanki daigaku) is a private women's junior college in Ueda, Nagano, Japan, established in 1967.
