= Japan National Route 143 =

Road in Nagano prefecture, Japan

National Route 143
- 国道143号
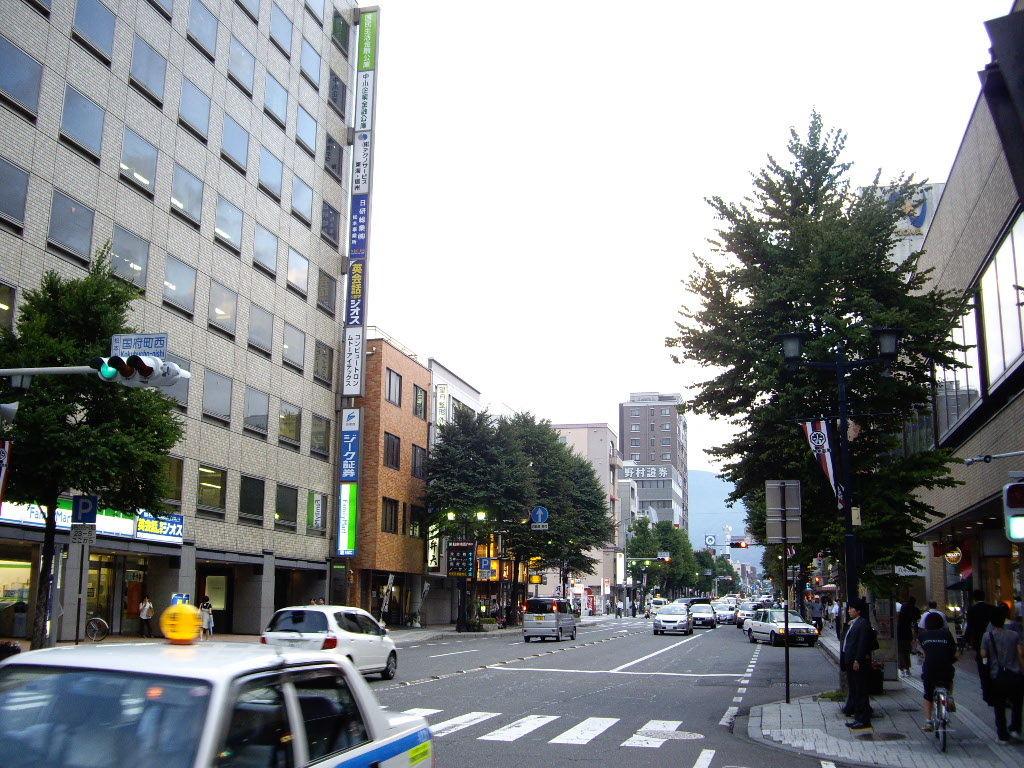

Route information
- Length: 51 km (32 mi)
- Existed: 1953–present

Major junctions
- West end: National Route 19 / National Route 158 in Matsumoto, Nagano
- East end: National Route 18 in Ueda, Nagano

Location
- Country: Japan

Highway system
- National highways of Japan; Expressways of Japan
← National Route 142	→ National Route 144

National Route 143 is a national highway of Japan connecting Matsumoto, Nagano and Ueda, Nagano in Japan, with a total length of 51 km (32 mi).
