= Bessho-Onsen Station =

Railway station in Ueda, Nagano Prefecture, Japan

Bessho-Onsen Station 別所温泉駅
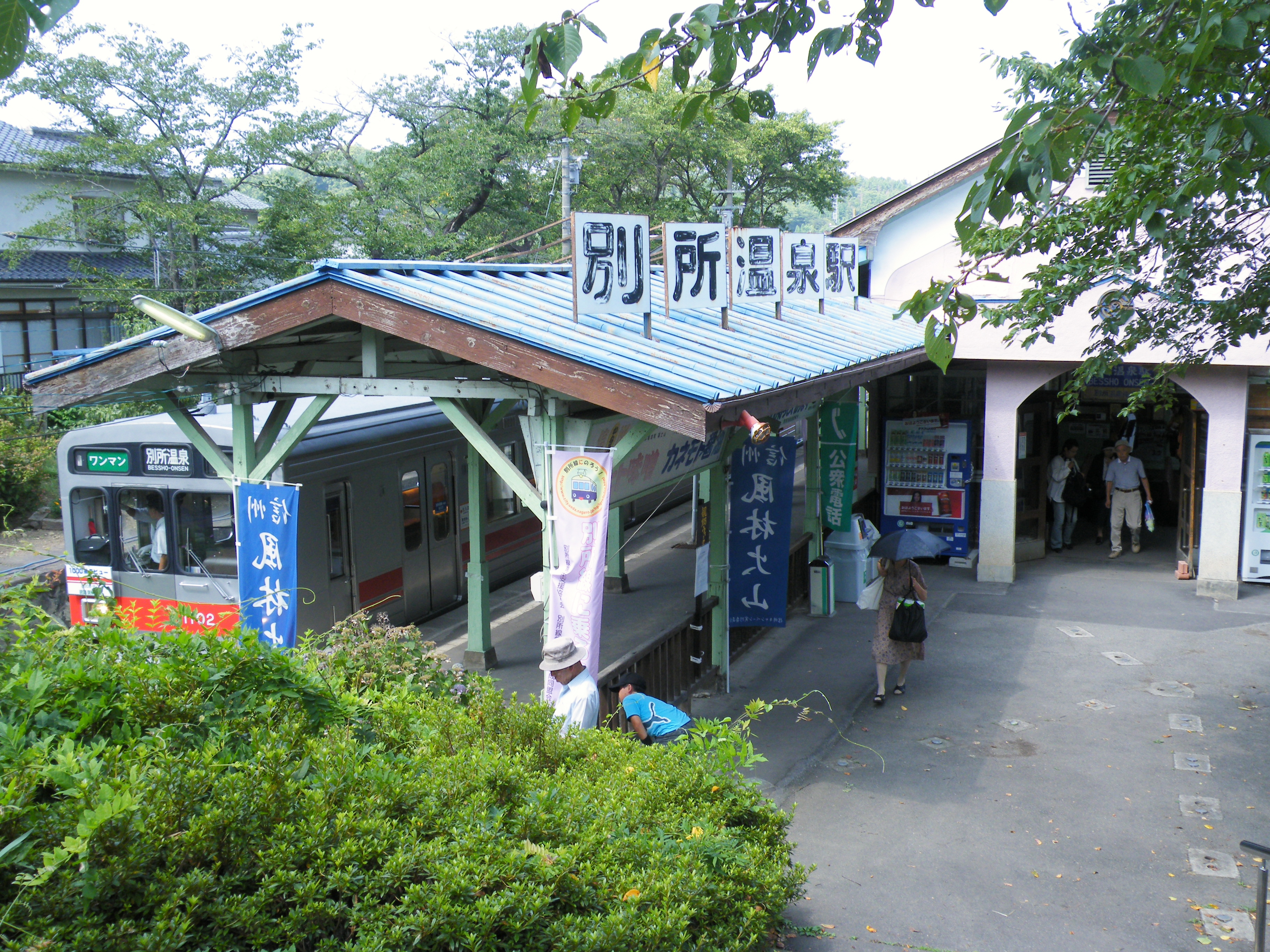
- Bessho-Onsen Station in August 2008

General information
- Location: 1853-3 Bessho-Onsen, Ueda-shi, Nagano-ken 386-1431; Japan
- Coordinates: 36°21′10.56″N 138°9′42.44″E
- Operator: Ueda Electric Railway
- Line: ■ Bessho Line
- Distance: 11.6 km from Ueda
- Platforms: 1 side platform
- Tracks: 1

Other information
- Status: Staffed
- Station code: BE15
- Website: Official website

History
- Opened: 17 June 1921

Passengers
- FY2015: 609 daily

Services
Preceding station	Ueda Electric Railway	Following station
Terminus	Bessho Line	Yagisawa BE14 towards Ueda
Location
- Location within Nagano Prefecture Location within Japan

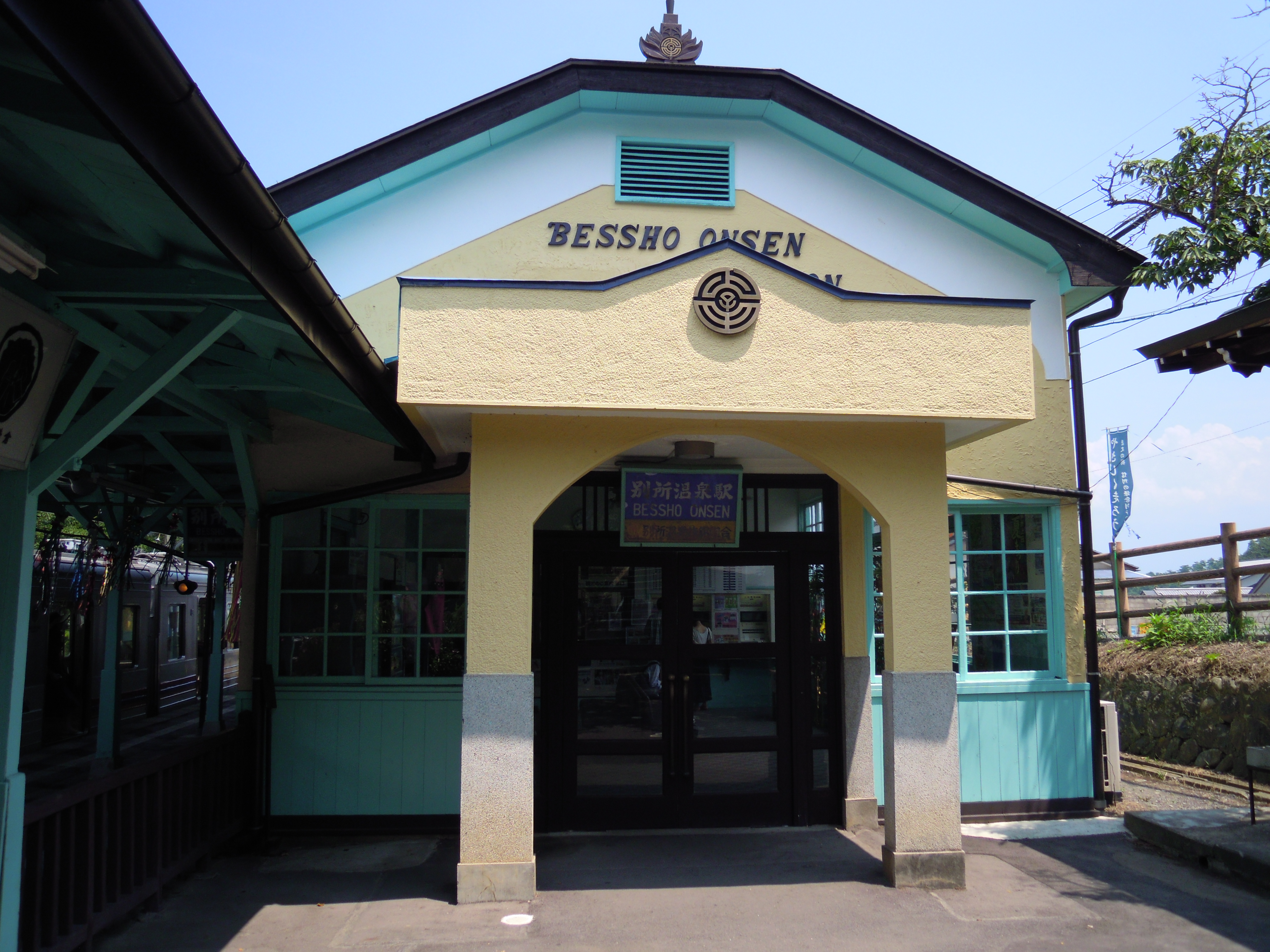
Entry to Bessho-Onsen Station

Bessho-Onsen Station (別所温泉駅, Bessho-Onsen-eki) is a railway station in the city of Ueda, Nagano, Japan, operated by the private railway operating company Ueda Electric Railway.

== Lines ==
Bessho-Onsen Station is the terminus of the Bessho Line and is 11.6 kilometers from the opposing terminus of the line at Ueda Station.

== Station layout ==
The station consists of one ground-level side platform serving a single dead headed track. The station formerly had a bay platform, but one side of the platform is no longer in use. The station is one of the few stations on the line which is staffed.

== History ==
The station opened on 17 June 1921. The current station building was remodeled in 1950.

Station numbering was introduced in August 2016 with Bessho-Onsen being assigned station number BE15.

== Passenger statistics ==
In fiscal 2015, the station was used by an average of 609 passengers daily (boarding passengers only).

== Surrounding area ==
- Bessho-Onsen
- Kitamuki Kannon
- Anraku-ji (Ueda)

== See also ==
- List of railway stations in Japan
