= Ueda Station (Nagano) =

Railway station in Ueda, Nagano Prefecture, Japan

BE01 Ueda Station 上田駅
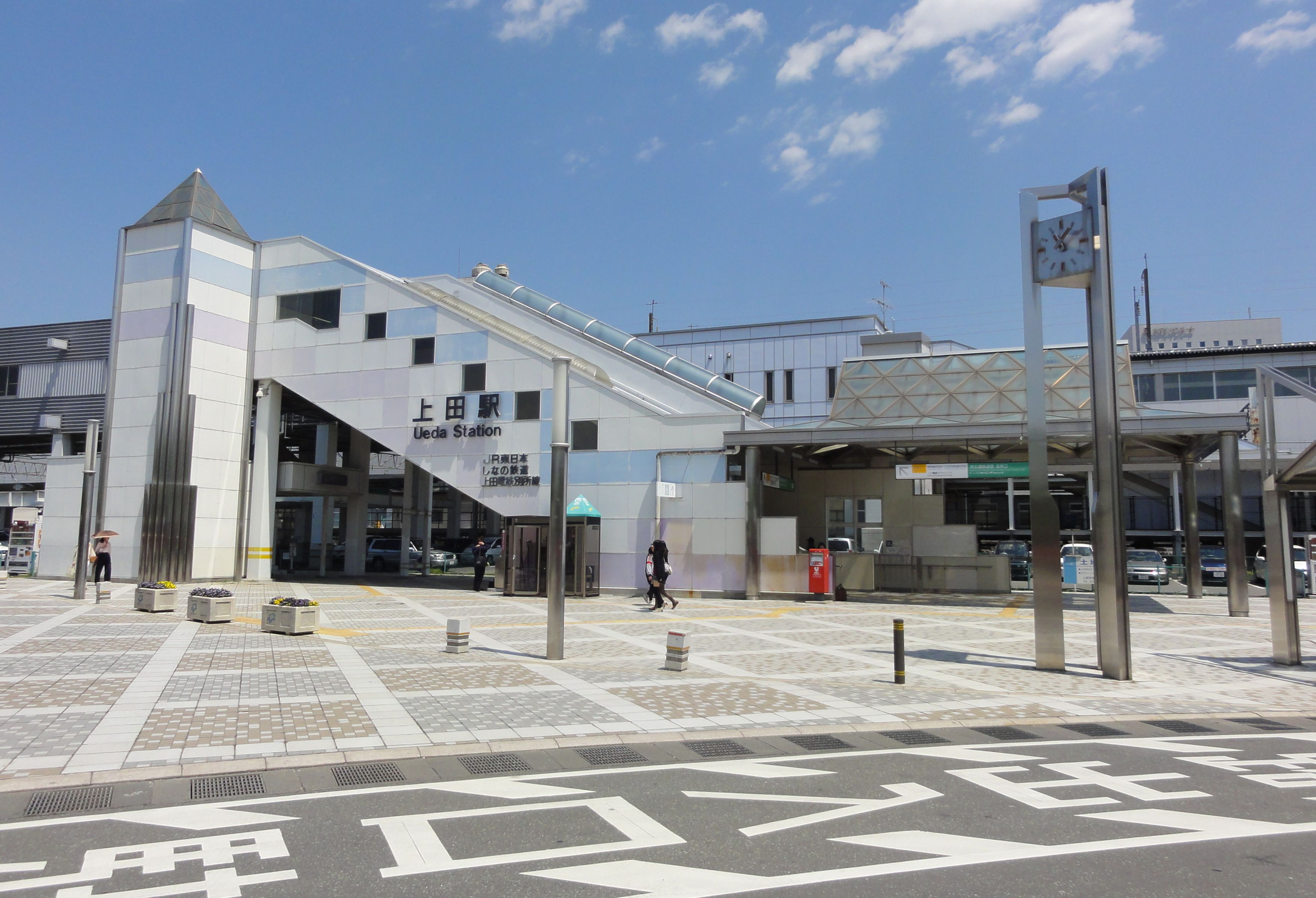
- Ueda Station Onsen entrance in 2012

General information
- Location: 1-1887 Tenjin, Ueda-shi, Nagano-ken 386–0025; Japan
- Coordinates: 36.396501°N 138.249764°E
- Elevation: 446 m (1,463 ft)
- Operator: JR East; Shinano Railway; Ueda Electric Railway
- Lines: Hokuriku Shinkansen; ■ Shinano Railway Line; ■ Ueda Electric Railway Bessho Line
- Platforms: 4 side + 1 island platforms
- Connections: Bus stop

Other information
- Status: Staffed (Midori no Madoguchi )
- Station code: BE01

History
- Opened: 15 August 1888; 138 years ago

Passengers
- FY2015: 2,860 daily (JR East)

Services
| Preceding station | JR East | Following station |
|---|---|---|
| Nagano towards Jōetsumyōkō | Hokuriku Shinkansen Hakutaka | Sakudaira towards Tokyo |
| Nagano Terminus | Hokuriku Shinkansen Asama | Sakudaira towards Tokyo |
| Preceding station | Shinano Railway | Following station |
| Nishi-Ueda towards Nagano | Shinano Railway Line | Shinano-Kokubunji towards Karuizawa |
| Preceding station | Ueda Electric Railway | Following station |
| Shiroshita BE02 towards Bessho-Onsen | Bessho Line | Terminus |
Location
- Location within Nagano Prefecture Location within Japan

Ueda Station (上田駅, Ueda-eki) is a railway station in the city of Ueda, Nagano, Japan, jointly operated by the East Japan Railway Company (JR East), the third-sector operator Shinano Railway, and the private railway operator Ueda Electric Railway.

== Lines ==
Ueda Station is served by the following lines.

- Hokuriku Shinkansen (formerly named the Nagano Shinkansen), of which it is 189.2 kilometers from Tokyo Station.
- Shinano Railway Line, on which it is 40.6 kilometers from Karuizawa Station
- Ueda Electric Railway Bessho Line, of which it is the terminus

== Station layout ==
=== JR East platforms ===
The JR East station has two elevated opposed side platforms serving two tracks with the station building located underneath. The station has a Midori no Madoguchi staffed ticket office.

| 1 | ■ Hokuriku Shinkansen | for Takasaki, Ōmiya, and Tokyo |
| 2 | ■ Hokuriku Shinkansen | for Nagano |

=== Shinano Railway platforms ===
The Shinano Railway station has one ground-level side platform and one ground-level island platform serving a total of three tracks.

| 1 | ■ Shinano Railway Line | for Komoro and Karuizawa |
| 2 | ■ Shinano Railway Line | for Togura, Shinonoi, and Nagano |
| 3 | ■ Shinano Railway Line | for Togura, Shinonoi, and Nagano |

=== Ueda Electric Railway platform ===
The Ueda Electric Railway station has one ground-level dead-headed side platform serving a single bi-directional track.

== History ==
The station first opened on 15 August 1888. Local JR East trains services were transferred to the control of the Shinano Railway from 1 October 1997 with the opening of the Nagano Shinkansen. The Ueda Electric Railway station opened on 15 August 1924.

Station numbering was introduced to the Ueda Electric Railway platforms in August 2016 with Ueda being assigned station number BE01.

== Passenger statistics ==
In fiscal 2015, the JR East portion of the station was used by an average of 2,860 passengers daily (boarding passengers only).

== Bus routes ==
=== Oshiro guchi (お城口) ===
Track 1

- Chikuma Bus
  - Kakeyu Line
  - Aoki Line
  - Muroga Line
  - Nezu Line
  - Kendo Kawanishi Line
  - Takeshi Line
  - Utsukuhsigahara Yamamotokoya Line
  - Expressway Bus Ikebukuro・Shijuku Line for Shinjuku Highway Bus Terminal
  - Exprssway Bus Tachikawa Line for Tachikawa Station
  - Expressway Bus Kyoto・Osaka Line for Osaka Station via Kyoto Station
  - Limited express Bus Ueda・Matsumoto Line for Matsumoto Bus Terminal ※Runs on holidays and all days of August.

Track 2

- Ueda Bus
  - Sanada Line
  - Shibusawa Line
  - Soehi Line
  - Hoden Line
  - Shinshu Ueda Iryo Center Line
  - Shioda Line
  - Ario Ueda Line
  - Kubobayashi Line

Track 3

- Ueda Bus
  - Sugadaira Kogen Line
  - "Shinshu no Kamakura Koto meguri Line" (Sightseeing Bus)
  - "Sanada Ichizoku no Sato meguri Line" (Sightseeing Bus)
  - "Furinkazan to Kawanakajimakassen Line" (Sightseeing Bus)
  - Limited express Bus Yubatake Ueda・Kusatsu Onsen Line for Kusatsu Onsen Bus Terminal ※Runs on partly days.
- JR Bus
  - Wadatoge Kita Line
  - Expressway Bus Dream Shinshu for Kyoto Station・Osaka Station

Track 4 ＊Circular-route Bus in Ueda

- "Aka Bus"
- "Ao Bus"
- Ueda Machinaka Junkai Bus

=== Onsen guchi ===
- Azumino Taxi – for Hotaka Station

== Surrounding area ==
- Ueda Castle

== See also ==
- List of railway stations in Japan
