= Chūetsu region =

Chūetsu region (中越地方, Chūetsu-chihō) is the area in central Niigata Prefecture. The word chūetsu is an abbreviation for the historic Echigo Province.

It is an important rice-growing region. Koshihikari which had been grown in this region is highly prized in Japan.

In common with much of Hokuriku region, the region experiences heavy snowfall during winter, and many ski resorts dot the mountainous areas.

The main cities in the region include Nagaoka and Uonuma

The October 23 2004 Chūetsu earthquake, centred on Ojiya, killed 67 people in the region. The magnitude 6.8 quake caused the first ever derailment of a shinkansen.

== Geography ==
=== Terrain ===
- Mountains: Mount Naeba, Mount Hakkaisan, Mount Echigo-Komagatake, Mount Makihatayama, Mount Yoneyama, Mount Sumondake, Mount Yahiko
- Rivers: Shinano River, Uono River, Shibukai River
- Mountain Range: Echigo Mountains
- Hills: Uonuma Hills, Tokubiki Hills
- Hot springs: Yudami hot spring, Hodaira hot spring, Muikamachi hot spring, Echigo Yuzawa hot spring, Matsunoyama hot spring
