= Araya Site =

Japanese Paleolithic settlement

- 荒屋遺跡 (Japanese)
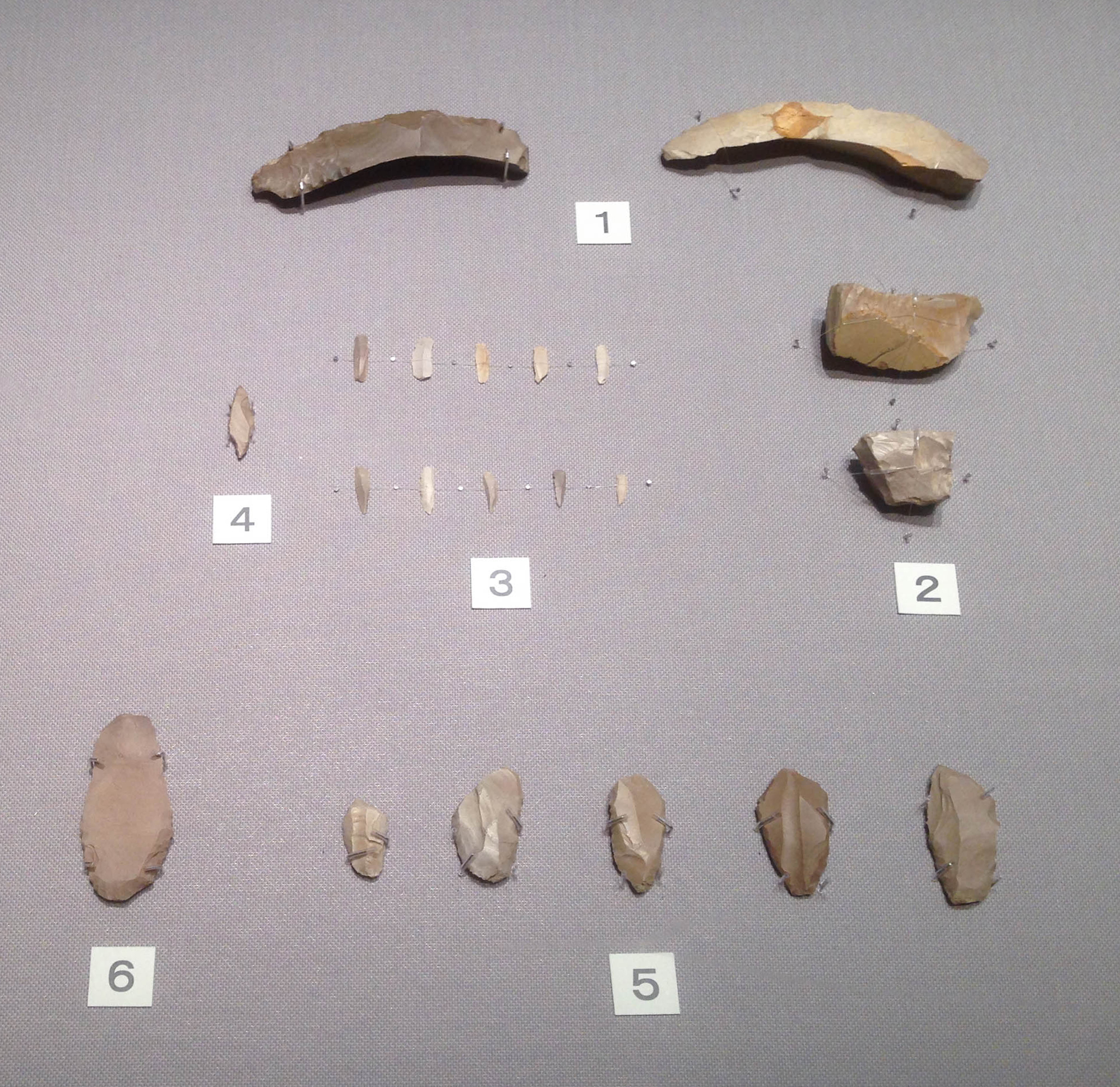
- Stone tools from Araya Site at the Tokyo National Museum

- Araya Site Araya Site (Japan)
- 37°15′51″N 138°51′31″E
- Type: Settlement
- Periods: Japanese Paleolithic
- Location: Nagaoka, Niigata, Japan
- Region: Hokuriku region

History
- Built: 15,000 BC

Site notes
- Excavation dates: 1957
- Public access: Yes (no public facilities)

The Araya Site (荒屋遺跡, Araya Iseki) is an archaeological site containing traces of a late Japanese Paleolithic settlement located in the former town of Kawaguchi in what is now part of the city of Nagaoka, Niigata in the Hokuriku region of Japan. It was found to contain one of the largest number of stone tools of any site thus far discovered in Japan. It was designated a National Historic Site of Japan in 2004.

== Location ==
The Araya site is located on a river terrace near the confluence of the Shinano River and the Uono River, approximately one kilometre (0.62 mi) south of Echigo-Kawaguchi Station. Four excavations have been conducted thus far, beginning in 1957. Excavated materials are stored in Meiji University (1st survey), Tōhoku University (2nd and 3rd surveys), the Nagaoka City Board of Education (4th survey), and at Tokyo National Museum.

== Description ==
The site extends over an area measuring 100 metres (330 ft) from east-to-west by 50 metres (160 ft) north-to south, and contains the ruins of several villages from approximately 17,000 years ago. The ruins overlap, indicating that a semi-nomadic population repeatedly returned to this site over many centuries. The foundations of pit dwellings and storage pits have been found.

== Artifacts ==
Excavated artifacts included 6,000 microlith blades, 9,000 microlith cores made using the Yubetsu technique, 1,000 lithic cores using the Horoka technique. In addition, chisel-shaped stone tools, a large number of scrapers, and over 100,000 arrow and spear points were found. The base materials for the stone tools and cores were mostly hard shale, which is common in coastal areas near the Sea of Japan.

The microlith blades represent a technological evolution that occurred during the Upper Paleolithic period, roughly until 13,000 years ago. The shapes and types of stone tools, such as stone axes, spears, and blades evolved in response to changes in the fauna available for hunting as the result of rapid changes in the environment. Microliths, thin and razor-shape blades of stone which were used by embedding into shafts of wood or bone, appear toward the end of the Upper Paleolithic.

It is likely that bone, horn and leather products were also actively produced at the site. They would have been needed to make completed projectile weapons, and also as part of the secondary processing of the stone to produce the very thin sharpened blades.

== Significance ==
The combination of a chisel-shaped stone tools designated the "Araya-type" and wedge-shaped microlithic blade cores has become an important index in the study of Paleolithic culture in Northeast Asia, and the style of tools found display both Mesolithic and Neolithic traits, similar to what has been found widely distributed across Siberia from Lake Baikal and into Alaska.

== See also ==
- List of Historic Sites of Japan (Niigata)
