= Chikuma =

Chikuma may refer to:

== Places ==
- Chikuma, Angola, a commune
- Chikuma District, a former district located in the vicinity of the current city of Matsumoto
- Chikuma mountains, mountains in Nagano Prefecture of Japan
- Chikuma, Nagano, a city located in Nagano Prefecture of Japan
  - Chikuma Station
- Chikuma Shobō, a Japanese publisher
- Chikuma River, the name of the Shinano River as it flows through Nagano Prefecture

== People ==
- Fumiko Chikuma (知久馬 二三子; born 1937), Japanese Social Democratic Party politician
- Jun Chikuma (竹間 淳), Japanese music composer and musician

== Characters ==
- Chikuma Koshirou, a character in the novel The Kouga Ninja Scrolls

== Others ==
- Chikuma-class cruiser, a class of protected cruisers of the Imperial Japanese Navy
- Japanese ship Chikuma, several warships
