= Mono (manga) =

Japanese manga series

- First tankōbon volume cover
- Genre: Comedy
- Manga
- Written by: Afro
- Published by: Houbunsha
- English publisher: NA: Yen Press
- Imprint: Manga Time KR Comics
- Magazine: Manga Time Kirara Miracle! (May 16 – October 16, 2017); Manga Time Kirara Carat (December 28, 2017 – present)
- Original run: May 16, 2017 – present
- Volumes: 5
- Anime television series
- Directed by: Ryota Aikei
- Written by: Yoko Yonaiyama
- Music by: Hajime Hyakkoku
- Studio: Soigne
- Licensed by: NA: Aniplex of America; SEA: Plus Media Networks Asia
- Original network: Tokyo MX, GYT, GTV, BS11, MBS, YBS, AT-X
- Original run: April 13, 2025 – June 29, 2025
- Episodes: 12
- icon

Mono (stylized in all lowercase) is a Japanese four-panel manga series written and illustrated by Afro. It began serialization in Houbunsha's Manga Time Kirara Miracle! magazine in May 2017, and was later transferred to the Manga Time Kirara Carat magazine in December 2017. An anime television series adaptation produced by Soigne aired from April to June 2025.

== Premise ==
Set in and around Yamanashi Prefecture, Satsuki Amamiya joins her school's Photography Club after being inspired by Club President and senior student Makinohara, who she adored. However, when Makinohara graduates and hands the role of Club President over to her, Satsuki is left aimless, along with her best friend, An Kiriyama, as the club is now at the risk of being disbanded with only two members to its name. As Satsuki and An buy new cameras to help their photography endeavours, Satsuki's 360 camera never arrives, leading to an encounter with its seller, Haruno Akiyama — a slice-of-life manga artist — who decides to use the girls as models for her manga.

In a turn of events, the Photography Club's fate changes when Sakurako Shikishima, a member of the Cinema Club, agrees to merge her club with Satsuki's, forming the Cinephoto Club together. To fulfill their club activities, the club and Haruno explore new places, capture a variety of photos with different kinds of cameras, experience the local cuisine and embark on other endeavours, not strictly related to photography.

== Characters ==
Satsuki Amamiya (雨宮 さつき, Amamiya Satsuki)
Voiced by: Haruna Mikawa (Japanese); Abby Trott (English)
The president of the Cinephoto Club, who uses a 360 camera. Initially having no interest with photography, she was inspired to take it up after joining the Photography Club and following its former club president Makinohara, whom she highly regarded.
An Kiriyama (霧山 アン, Kiriyama An)
Voiced by: Aoi Koga (Japanese); Michaela Jill Murphy (English)
The overzealous best friend of Satsuki and another member of the Cinephoto Club, who uses an action camera. She joined the club to support Satsuki, despite also initially having no interest in photography.
Sakurako Shikishima (敷島 桜子, Shikishima Sakurako)
Voiced by: Hikaru Tono (Japanese); Yolis Arroyo (English)
The lackadaisical member of the Cinephoto Club. She was formerly the president of the Cinema Club, who eagerly joined Satsuki's Photography Club and led the effort to merge their clubs to avoid their dissolution.
Haruno Akiyama (秋山 春乃, Akiyama Haruno)
Voiced by: Reina Ueda (Japanese); Kana Shimanuki (English)
A manga artist who becomes acquainted with the Cinephoto Club as its sponsor and uses their experiences as inspiration for her manga. She lives with her grandmother and owns a cat named Taishou, who often roams around various places in Yamanashi.
Kako Komada (駒田 華子, Komada Kako)
Voiced by: Maki Kawase (Japanese); Hayden Bishop (English)
Haruno's friend from high school who has been working as a motovlogger, often visiting her former classmates to shoot videos with them.
Torayo Kurokuma (玄熊虎代, Kurokuma Torayo) / Kurokuma-sensei (クロクマ先生)
Voiced by: Hina Yōmiya (Japanese); Shannon Purser (English)
A friend of Haruno who works as a horror manga artist. She also specializes in communicating with the supernatural.

== Media ==
=== Manga ===
Written and illustrated by Afro, Mono began serialization in Houbunsha's Manga Time Kirara Miracle! magazine on May 16, 2017. After the final issue of Manga Time Kirara Miracle! was published on October 16, 2017, the series was transferred to the Manga Time Kirara Carat magazine on December 28 that same year. The series' chapters have been collected into five tankōbon volumes as of June 2025.

In June 2024, Yen Press announced that they licensed the series for English publication beginning in November 2024.

Afro mentioned that this work is related to their other series Laid-Back Camp, and its characters and scenes occasionally appear in this work. A collaboration chapter with Laid-Back Camp was published in the March 2021 issue of Manga Time Kirara Carat on January 28, 2021.

No.	Original release date	Original ISBN	English release date	English ISBN
1	October 25, 2018	978-4-8322-4989-9	November 19, 2024	979-8-8554-0942-0
2	February 25, 2021	978-4-8322-7256-9	April 29, 2025	979-8-8554-0944-4
3	October 27, 2022	978-4-8322-7411-2	September 2, 2025	979-8-8554-0946-8
4	April 25, 2024	978-4-8322-9543-8	March 24, 2026	979-8-8554-1088-4
5	June 26, 2025	978-4-8322-9643-5	October 27, 2026	979-8-8554-3571-9

=== Anime ===
An anime television series adaptation was announced on March 22, 2024. It is produced by Aniplex, animated by Soigne and directed by Ryota Aikei, with Yoko Yonaiyama writing series scripts, Takuya Miyahara designing the characters, and Hajime Hyakkoku composing the music. The series aired from April 13 to June 29, 2025, on Tokyo MX and other networks. (Note: Tokyo MX lists the series premiere on April 12, 2025, at 24:00, which is effectively April 13 at midnight JST.) The opening theme song is "Many Merry Memories!" (メニメリ・メモリーズ！), performed by Cinephoto-bu (a group consisting of Haruna Mikawa, Aoi Koga, and Hikaru Tono as their respective characters), while the ending theme song is "Weekend Roll" (ウィークエンドロール), performed by Halca. Aniplex of America licensed the series and streams it on Crunchyroll. Plus Media Networks Asia licensed the series in Southeast Asia and broadcasts it on Aniplus Asia.

==== Episodes ====
No.	Title	Directed by	Written by	Storyboarded by	Original release date
1	"mono Trip"; Transliteration: "mono no Tabi" (Japanese: monoの旅)	Ryota Aikei, Naoya Morotomi & Tomoki Nakagami	Yoko Yonaiyama	Ryota Aikei & Naoya Morotomi	April 13, 2025
Satsuki Amamiya gains ownership of her school's Photography Club following the graduation of club president Makinohara, but is left aimless on its direction. Wanting to cheer Satsuki up, fellow club member and best friend An Kiriyama suggests they purchase new equipment. An purchases an action camera but Satsuki's 360 camera does not arrive, leading the two to meet its seller, manga artist Haruno Akiyama, who they learn also lives in Kōfu. Satsuki and An test out their cameras, as Haruno, observing the two students, decides to use their experiences for her new manga. Haruno later approaches them for further assistance in creating material, and they agree to help. The trio travels to Yamanashi Science Museum and record a time-lapse of the city. They are left impressed with the developed time-lapse, motivating Satsuki to take more photos with her new camera.
2	"Making of Some Aerial Photography!"; Transliteration: "Meikingu Obu Kūsatsu!!" (Japanese: メイキング・オブ・空撮!!)	Akari Ranzaki	Yoko Yonaiyama	Akari Ranzaki	April 20, 2025
2	"Visiting A Classmate, 3000 Leagues – Motovlog Part 12"; Transliteration: "Kurasumeito Tazunete Sanzenri ~Motoburogu Pāto 12~" (Japanese: クラスメイト訪ねて三千里～モトブログパート12～)	Akari Ranzaki	Yoko Yonaiyama	Akari Ranzaki	April 20, 2025
Satsuki and An learn to their shock that the Photography Club is being dissolved. After hearing that the Cinema Club is also being dissolved, An suggests they invite its members to avoid the club's dissolution. Cinema Club member Sakurako Shikishima agrees to join and assists them in taking kite aerial photography. Upon experiencing the joy she felt from her time in the active Cinema Club with Satsuki and An, Sakurako finalizes the merge between the Photography and Cinema Clubs, saving the clubs from dissolution and forming the Cinephoto Club as a result. While thinking of new material for her manga, Haruno is surprised by the visit of her high school friend Kako Komada. They travel around Yamanashi and catch up on their careers, where Kako explains she has been motovlogging after being inspired by the freedom motorcycling offers and the opportunity of seeing new places. After enjoying her time with Kako, Haruno uses their sightseeing as inspiration for her manga.
3	"Right Before It Becomes an Anime!! The Manga Pilgrimage Stamp Rally with a Schedule from Hell!"; Transliteration: "Anime-ka Chokuzen!! Jigoku no Dangan Seichi Junrei Sutanpurarī!!" (Japanese: アニメ化直前!!地獄の弾丸聖地巡礼スタンプラリー!!)	Fumiyuki Uehara, Kohei Kuratomi & Naoya Murakawa	Natsu Yoshioka	Fumiyuki Uehara	April 27, 2025
The Cinephoto Club decides their next course of action on what to shoot, as Haruno invites them to visit locations featured in a manga that is to be adapted into an anime. The club agrees to her offer, though they are surprised to learn they will be visiting numerous locations for two days without rest. During the trip around Lake Motosu where the Cinephoto Club takes photos of notable landmarks, they are unnerved with the atmosphere of Minami Alps and flee in terror. After taking a break, Haruno and the Cinephoto Club resume their trip and visit locations around Nagano. The group reaches the summit of Mount Hachibuse in the Chikuma mountains and are stunned with its view, prompting Satsuki to ask Haruno if they can stay longer. The group later heads home after a stopover at Mount Kirigamine, satisfied with the trip.
4	"A Comfy Manga Artist Goes on a Winery Tour – Motovlog Part 13"; Transliteration: "Iyashikei Mangaka Wainarī Meguri ~Motoburogu Pāto 13~" (Japanese: 癒し系マンガ家ワイナリー巡り～モトブログパート13～)	Hokuto Sadamoto	Yamashiro DL Yukitaka	Hokuto Sadamoto	May 4, 2025
4	"Taking Pictures of Food and Getting Full Until We Explode"; Transliteration: "Manpuku Fotorarī: Manpuku Chuusuu Shinkei Kanzen Hakai" (Japanese: まんぷくフォトラリー～満腹中枢神経完全破壊～)	Hokuto Sadamoto	Yamashiro DL Yukitaka	Hokuto Sadamoto	May 4, 2025
Kako invites Haruno to Kōshū to find a wine of her preference, with the Cinephoto Club tagging along. The group visits a winery, where Haruno volunteers to taste the wine on Kako's behalf, much to Kako's skepticism. Despite promising to drink in moderation, Haruno subsequently becomes drunk as the Cinephoto Club grows dizzy after visiting the hot springs. Kako takes the group home, and she learns to her dismay that the wine she was recommended can be easily bought in a supermarket. As summer break begins, Haruno requests the Cinephoto Club to participate in a stamp rally around Kōfu focusing on food and photography. The club agrees to join, but they learn during the rally that they must also eat large servings of food. Satsuki and An reluctantly take up the challenge in order to win the rally, and they learn Sakurako can eat the large servings. When Sakurako is unable to continue, Satsuki also begins eating large servings on her behalf. Despite their efforts, they lose, prompting the club to turn down another stamp rally offered by Haruno.
5	"The Story of Dry-Cured Ham in Yamanashi"; Transliteration: "~Hahamu Yamanashi Monogatari~" (Japanese: ～生ハム山梨物語～)	Naoya Morotomi	Natsu Yoshioka	Naoya Morotomi	May 11, 2025
5	"A Haunted Spot and Incident of Possession"; Transliteration: "Shinrei Supotto Hyōi Jiken" (Japanese: 心霊スポット憑依事件)	Naoya Morotomi	Natsu Yoshioka	Naoya Morotomi	May 11, 2025
Haruno, Kako, and the Cinephoto Club travel to Yatsugatake and Kiyosato to buy dry-cured ham as they also take the opportunity to visit and photograph local attractions. Haruno's constant purchases of ham cause her to be teased by Kako and An, much to her annoyance. They later compute the total amount of ham purchased and Haruno is left shocked at its exorbitant price. Satsuki and An check the footage of Haruno's work that were recorded by An's camera. They are, however, frightened when they spot a ghost in the recording. Haruno contacts her friend Torayo Kurokuma to investigate the paranormal sighting. Kurokuma reveals the ghost came from the group's visit in Minami Alps, and she requests Haruno to return the ghost to its original location. Haruno complies, and she prays for the ghost's safety and wishes to see them again. Despite accomplishing the request, Kurokuma shares to Haruno the ghost came back to her, much to her dismay.
6	"Taking the Perfect Picture of a Maruishi Dosojin in Yamanashi!"; Transliteration: "Yamanashi de Kanpeki na Maruishi Dōsoshin o Gekisha suru!" (Japanese: 山梨で完璧な丸石道祖神を激写する！)	Ryō Takei	Yoko Yonaiyama	Ryō Takei	May 18, 2025
6	"We'll Enjoy Some Curry in Yamanashi"; Transliteration: "Yamanashi de Karē, Tabemasu" (Japanese: 山梨でカレー、食べます)	Ryō Takei	Yoko Yonaiyama	Ryō Takei	May 18, 2025
Haruno and the Cinephoto Club join a contest to find the roundest Maruishi Dōsojin around Yamanashi to win a holiday trip to Costa Rica, but they struggle finding sculptures that fit the description. They travel around town to take pictures of notable Dōsojin, and they get close to finding the roundest sculpture. Haruno later learns from her grandmother a Dōsojin is found at the back of her house, and she takes a picture of it. She wins second place and calls the club to check her prize, only for them to find out to their disappointment that it is a replica Dōsojin. Haruno begins to have a craving for curry and brings Kako and An to her favorite curry restaurant. However, she finds the establishment to be closed. She frantically begins finding for alternatives, dragging a terrified Kako and An along as they find each restaurant to be unavailable. They eventually settle for convenience store curry, satisfying Haruno.
7	"First Time for an Anime Adaptation"; Transliteration: "Hajimete no Anime-ka" (Japanese: 初めてのアニメ化)	Tomoki Nakagami	Yoko Yonaiyama	Tomoki Nakagami	May 25, 2025
7	"Calling All Manga Artists! Minobu Walker"; Transliteration: "Mangakka Shūketsu! Minobu Uōkā" (Japanese: 漫画家集結！身延ウォーカー)	Tomoki Nakagami	Yoko Yonaiyama	Tomoki Nakagami	May 25, 2025
Haruno and Kurokuma congratulate fellow manga artist Suzuko Isuzu on her manga getting an anime adaptation, though Suzuko states she is unable to think on her next action due to her writer's block. The artists discuss the production behind an adaptation, where Kurokuma shares anecdotes of her manga's anime adaptation being riddled with misfortune and curses, unnerving Haruno and Suzuko. They also decide to participate in a donburi stamp rally in Minobu with their editor Koharu Shimada for Suzuko to use as motivation. The group enjoys their time eating various mini rice-bowls around town while discussing their work and how to ward off misfortune. After accomplishing the stamp rally, the group begins their ascent to Mount Minobu and receive their prizes. Koharu then suffers from back pain, forcing her to be escorted by Kurokuma to a hospital as Haruno and Suzuko look on.
8	"Nagano/Toyama Trip That's on the Test (The First Night)"; Transliteration: "Shiken ni Deru Nagano・Toyama Tabi Dai Ichi Yoru" (Japanese: 試験に出る長野・富山の旅 第1夜)	Hidenori Makino	Natsu Yoshioka	Hidenori Makino	June 1, 2025
Haruno and the Cinephoto Club plan a three-day trip around Nagano and Toyama before summer break ends, where An uses it as an opportunity to go longboarding in Mount Norikura with Sakurako using her action camera. The group decides to travel first to Mount Amariyama near Nirasaki to practice longboarding and take pictures, during which they encounter Kurokuma researching for her horror manga. They join her to Sarawa Pond and become frightened by their assumptions of the location. Sometime later, the group travels to Mount Norikura and they visit its attractions. An and Sakurako split off from Satsuki and Haruno, and they begin recording their longboarding down the mountain. However, An and Sakurako realize to their embarrassment they took a different route from their initial uphill journey, causing them to be separated from Satsuki and Haruno.
9	"Nagano/Toyama Trip That's on the Test (The Second Night)"; Transliteration: "Shiken ni Deru Nagano・Toyama Tabi Dai Ni Yoru" (Japanese: 試験に出る長野・富山の旅 第2夜)	Sho Kitamura	Natsu Yoshioka	Sho Kitamura	June 8, 2025
Kako catches up to the group at Kamikōchi after oversleeping and contends with the summer heat and mechanical problems of her bike during the journey. Upon arriving, she finds Haruno and the Cinephoto Club having failed to explore much of the place, so they camp for the night. They later head to Kurobe Dam and the group is driven to tears after watching a documentary of the dam's construction, baffling Satsuki. The group travels next to Hakuba Ski Jumping Stadium and become overwhelmed with its heights.
10	"Nagano/Toyama Trip That's on the Test (The Third Night)"; Transliteration: "Shiken ni Deru Nagano・Toyama Tabi Dai San Yoru" (Japanese: 試験に出る長野・富山の旅 第3夜)	Aose Sakaguchi, Soba Imaoka & Nokoi Machikado	Yamashiro DL Yukitaka	Yūki Gotō & Akari Ranzaki	June 15, 2025
En route to Togakushi, the group stops by a haunted tree stump. Kurokuma meets with the group as she explains the tree stump's origins and warns them of strange phenomena, before the group learns to their horror Kurokuma was not with them. They travel to Togakushi Shrine and later visit a restaurant to cook the region's renowned soba noodles. The group wraps up their three-day trip by visiting a ninja museum, and Haruno and the Cinephoto Club part ways from Kako. The group spends time on their own activities, with the Cinephoto Club accomplishing their schoolwork, Haruno working on her manga, and Kako traveling to Hokkaido.
11	"Enjoying All the Spots on the Yamanashi Shaved Ice Map"; Transliteration: "Yamanashi Kakigōri Mappu Kanzen Seiha" (Japanese: 山梨かき氷マップ完全制覇)	Kiikun	Yoko Yonaiyama	Kiikun	June 22, 2025
While thinking of how to spend their remaining summer break, An suggests to the Cinephoto Club they go on a two-day trip around Yamanashi to eat at stores serving kakigōri. Satsuki and Sakurako agree, and they begin traveling to the stores while braving the sweltering heat. The Cinephoto Club try out different types of kakigōri, as they look back on their summer break. They complete the food trip, and Satsuki invites An and Sakurako to a viewpoint overlooking Nirasaki and record a time-lapse. Satsuki then suggests they make a film, to which An and Sakurako eagerly agree as summer break draws to a close.
12	"POV Horror – What ever shall we do?" Transliteration: "POV Horā dō Deshou" (Japanese: POVホラーどうでしょう)	Ryota Aikei, Kohei Kuratomi, Ryō Takei & Naoya Murakawa	Yoko Yonaiyama	Yūsuke Yamamoto	June 29, 2025
The Cinephoto Club decides to shoot a found footage horror film at Fukashiro Dam, and they enlist the assistance of Haruno and Sakurako's fellow Cinema Club member Tajima. During filming, Tajima goes off-script and runs away, though she reassures the group that she is safe. Satsuki and An, however, begin to worry by the following week when Tajima seemingly disappears from school and leaves no record of her existence behind. Sakurako and Haruno later reveal that they worked with Tajima, whose real name is Inomata, to prank Satsuki and An. Inomata also reintroduces them to Makinohara, and they catch up on the club's activities, with Satsuki sharing she has been enjoying her time in the club and hoping to continue her work in photography.
