= Chikuma Mountains =

Mountainous region in Nagano Prefecture, Japan

- 筑摩山地 (Japanese)
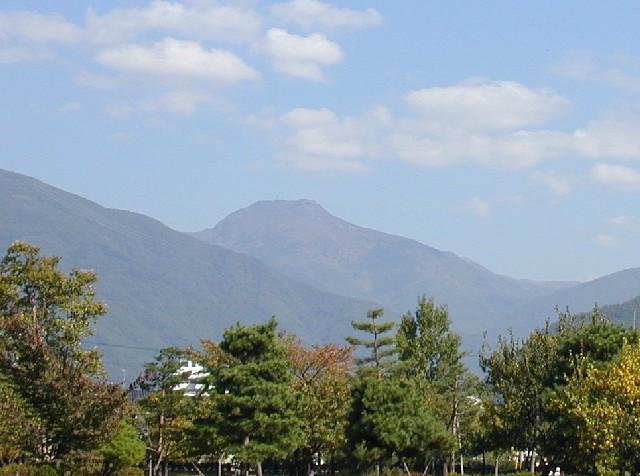
- Utsukushigahara seen from Matsumoto, Nagano.

Highest point
- Peak: Utsukushigahara
- Elevation: 2,034 m (6,673 ft)
- Coordinates: 36°10′N 138°05′E

Geography
- Location within Nagano Prefecture Location within Japan
- Location: Nishikubiki District, Niigata
- Country: Japan
- Prefectures: Nagano
- Parent range: Japanese Alps

The Chikuma Mountains (筑摩山地, Chikuma Sanchi) is a mountainous region in Japan that runs north-south through the central part of Nagano Prefecture. It is part of the Yatsugatake-Chūshin Kōgen Quasi-National Park.

The mountains Utsukushigahara, 2,034 m (6,673 ft), Kirigamine, and Kamuriki are within Chikuma range. It is a popular tourist's destination.

== Name ==
The range is named after the Chikuma River, Japan’s longest river at 367 kilometers. Its name comes from its twisted, meandering course: “Chi” meaning one thousand and “kuma” is a Chinese character meaning turns. In the Niigata Prefecture, the river's name changes to the Shinano River.

Geofeatures map of Chūbu region, Japan. Location of Chikuma mountains marked with up-down string 筑 摩 山 地 .

== Geography ==
The Chikuma Mountains separate the Chikuma River basin from the Azusa and Takase River basins. The northern part is bounded by the Susobana River with the Togakushi volcanic group, and the southern part is demarcated by the Wada Pass as the Tateshina and Yatsugatake volcanic mountain ranges. Most of the terrain is hilly terrain of 1,200 to 1,500 meters, and the elevation is higher in the south, with mountains such as Mt. Hachibuse (1,929 meters), Utsukushigahara (2,034 meters), and Takeshimine (1,973 meters), and its altitude decreases as it goes northward. The Sai River crosses the northern part as an antecedent river, forming a deep erosion valley.

== Transport infrastructure ==
The Chikuma mountain range has long been a major barrier to transportation, and has been used to connect the Ueda/Nagano Basin with the Matsumoto/Suwa Basin. Dowada Pass is known as a difficult place, and Misayama, the Shinwada road tunnel, and the JR Shinonoi Line Kamuriki Tunnel were also difficult construction projects. It straddles the Chushin region and the Toshin region, and has become a barrier to traffic between the two regions. In 1976, Sansaiyama tunnel was opened and transportation was drastically improved. There is also Wada Pass (Nagano) tunnel.

== See also ==
- Mount Myōkō
- Wada Pass (Nagano)
- Chikuma River
- Chikuma, Nagano
