= Japanese ship Chikuma =

At least three warships of Japan have borne the name Chikuma after the Chikuma River in Nagano Prefecture:

- Japanese cruiser Chikuma (1911), a Chikuma-class protected cruiser that was commissioned in 1912 and sunk as a target in 1935.
- Japanese cruiser Chikuma (1938), a Tone-class heavy cruiser that was commissioned in 1939 and scuttled in 1944 after the Battle off Samar.
- JS Chikuma, an Abukuma-class destroyer escort launched in 1992

== See also ==
- Chikuma
