= Nagawado Dam =

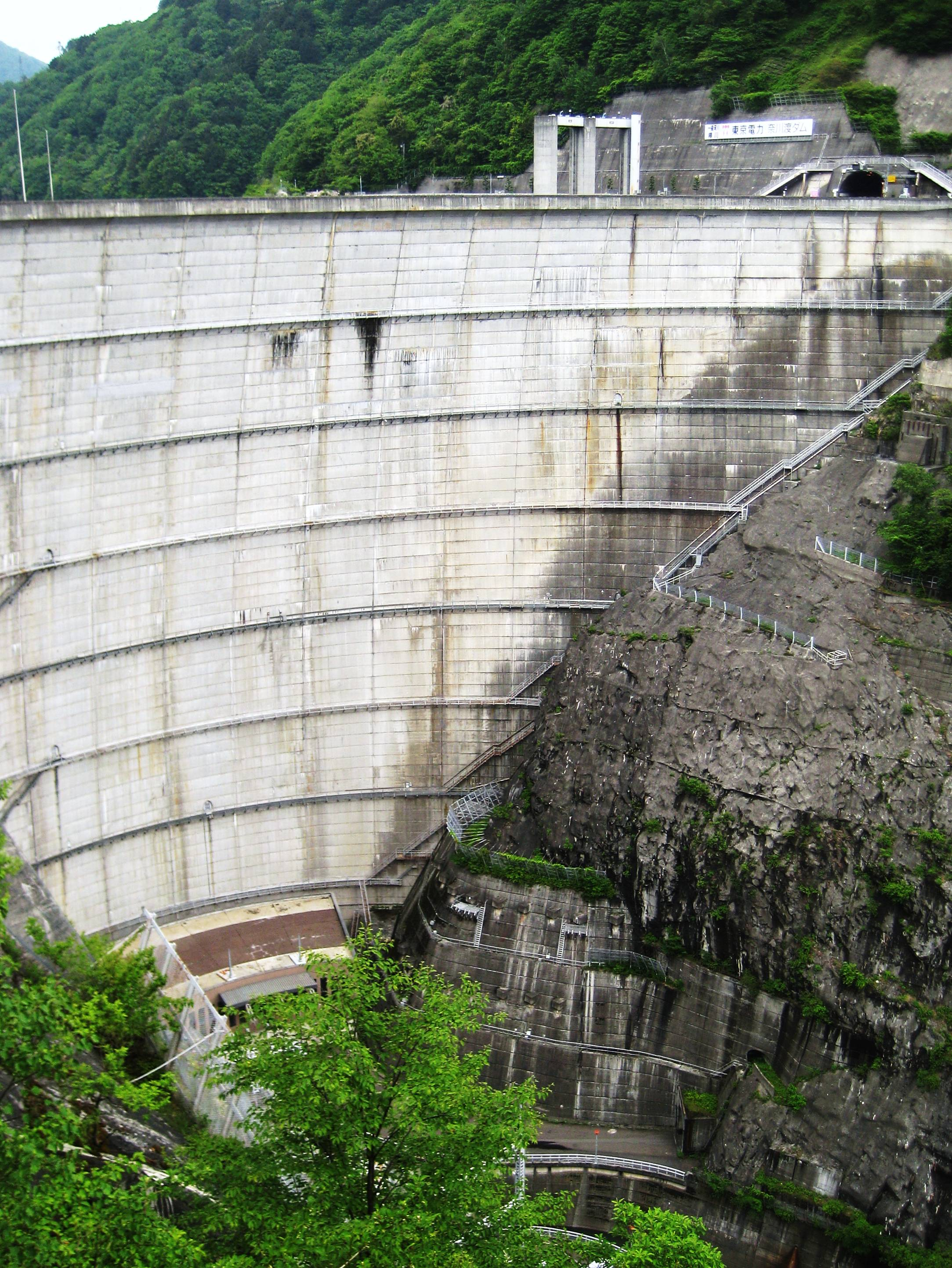
- Nagawado Dam

- Location within Japan
- Location: Nagano Prefecture, Japan
- Coordinates: 36°07′57″N 137°43′05″E
- Construction began: 1961
- Opening date: 1969

Dam and spillways
- Height: 155 m (509 ft)
- Length: 355.5 m (1,166 ft)

Reservoir
- Creates: Azusa Lake
- Total capacity: 123,000,000 m^{3}
- Catchment area: 380.5 km^{2}
- Surface area: 274.0 ha

Power Station
- Operator: Tokyo Electric Power Company (TEPCO)
- Installed capacity: 623 MW

Nagawado Dam (Japanese: 奈川渡ダム) is a dam in Nagano Prefecture, Japan, on the Azusa River completed in 1969. The dam is located in Azumi, Matsumoto City.

Construction began in 1961. The construction of the dam created Lake Azusa.

The Azumi Power Station is operated by Tokyo Electric Power Company (TEPCO). The dam is part of the Azusa 3 Dams, along with Midono Dam; and the Inekoki Dam. The dams use pumped-storage hydroelectricity.

== See also ==
- List of dams and reservoirs in Japan
