= Wada Pass (Nagano) =

Mountain Pass in Japan

和田峠
- English: Wada Pass
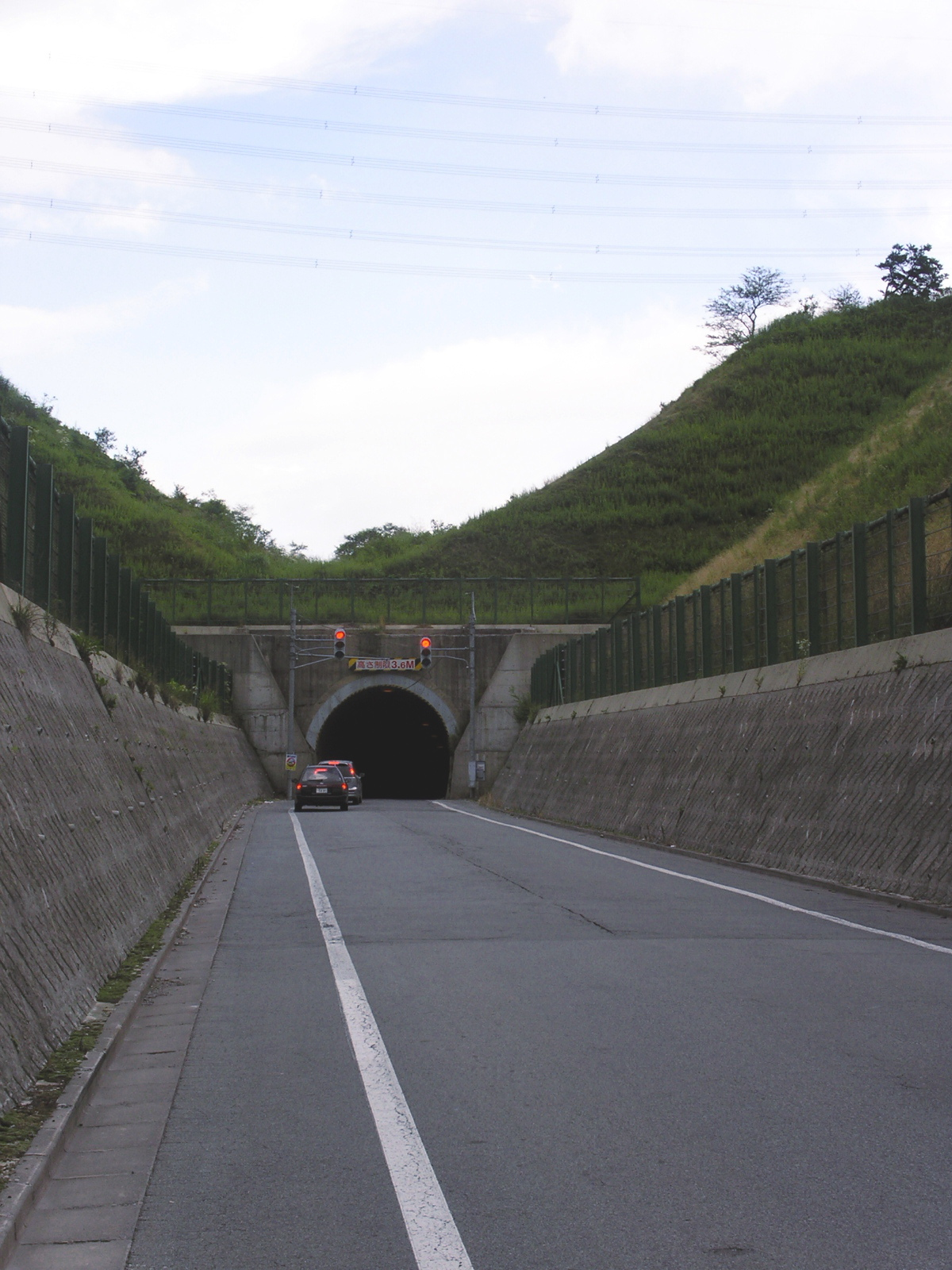
- Wada Pass Tunnel (contraflow of either direction once due to a lot narrower)

- Location within Nagano Prefecture Location within Japan
- Interactive map of 和田峠
- Elevation: 1,531 metres (5,023 ft)Japan; Nagawa, Nagano, Chiisagata District, Nagano Prefecture

Third Approach
- Range: Chikuma mountains
- Coordinates: 36°08′42″N 138°08′38″E

Wada Pass (和田峠, Wada-tōge) is a mountain pass in between Nagawa, Nagano, Chiisagata District and Shimosuwa, Nagano, at an altitude of 1,531m. Nakasendo passed through this mountain pass. Japan National Route 142 runs through the mountain pass by Wada Pass Tunnel and Shin-Wada Tunnel.

== Geo ==
One of the pass over the Chikuma mountains. Shinano River runs on the northern of the pass to Nihonkai, Tenryu River runs on the southern of pass via Lake Suwa to Pacific Ocean.

=== Outline ===
There was the place obsidian was produced in Jōmon period around this pass. The broad arrows made of obsidian produced from this pass were found in Kikonai, Hokkaido which is 650 km away from this pass. Wada Pass is still famous for output of obsidian. But, now, forbids collecting obsidian from the mount pass.

== History ==
=== Edo period ===
Nakasendo was constructed by Tokugawa shogunate, the mount pass belonged to the road. It is one of the most defensible chokepoints of the road because of heavy snow and precipitous topography. So, the government developed Nishi Mochiya quarter which located Shimosuwa and Higashi Mochiya quarter and Settai quarter that located Wada-shuku as asylum cover and rest house.

On 18 December 1864, "Tengu-to" which was organized by retainers of the Mito Domain combatted against allied forces which were organized by Suwa Domain and Matsumoto Domain. Eventually Tengu-to rode to victory.

=== From Meiji period to before the World War II ===
In 1876, Koyobashi Shido was open to traffic as motoring road. In 1925, 和田嶺自動車 (Wada Peak Automobile Road) was established and ran through this mount pass. But, this road was closed during winter due to heavy snow, so in 1933, Wada Pass Tunnel was constructed.

=== After World War II ===
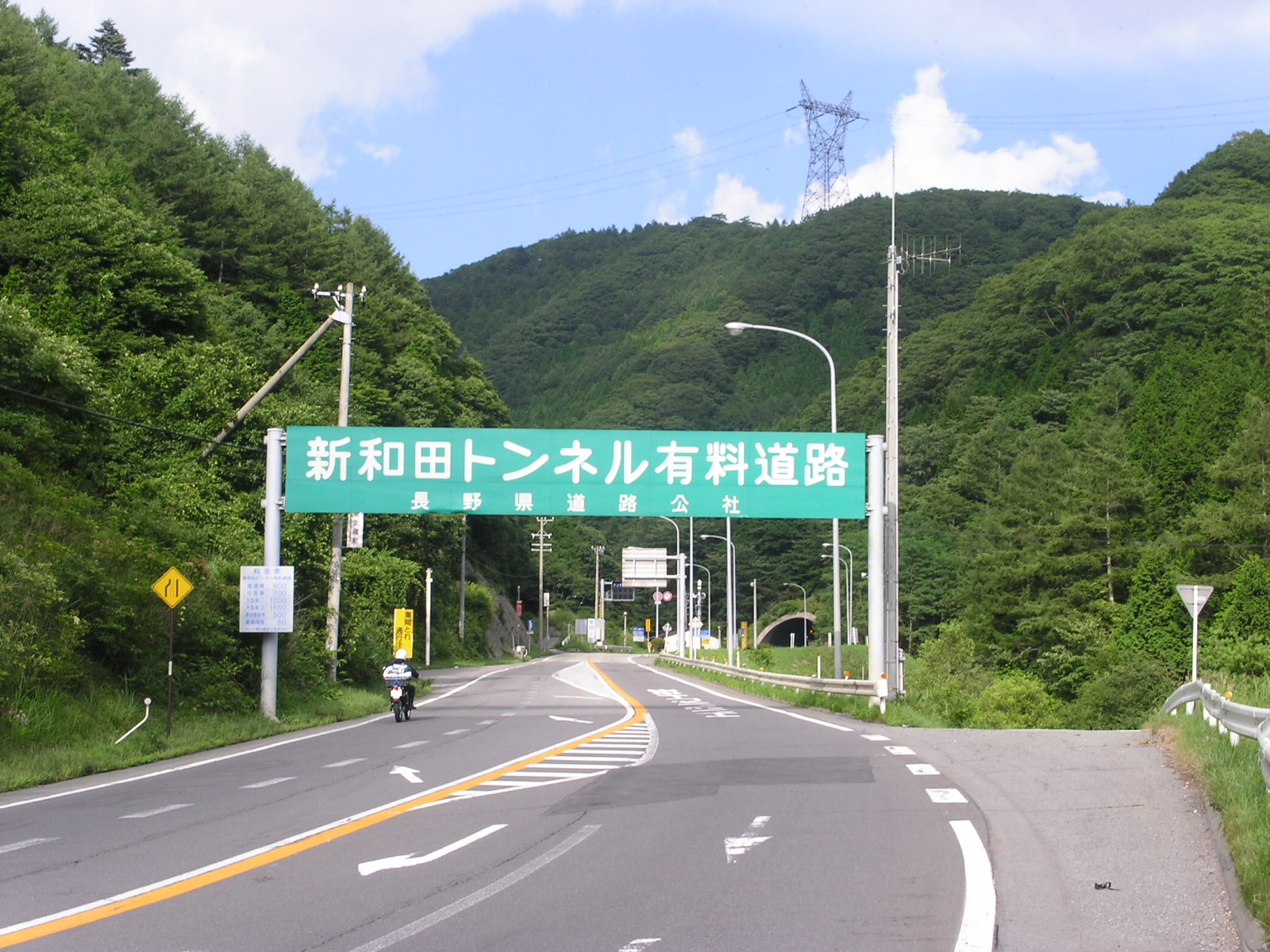
Shin Wada Tunnel

In 1953, the road was registered as Japan National Route 142. Wada Pass Tunnel is narrow, so vehicles are not able to run as two lanes. Eventually, now, the tunnel is mutual contraflow. In 1978, Shin Wada Tunnel was open to traffic.

== Japan National Route 142 ==
Shin Wada Tunnel the distant of which is 14,777 m that has belonged to the Shin-Wada Tunnel Toll Road since 1978. Since 1 April 2022, a driver is able to pass through the former toll road without toll tickets, so the road which runs over this tunnel has been gone free to pass through since 1 April 2022.

== Historic site ==
- Higashi Mochiya (There were hotels which were opened around Edo era)
- Roninzuka（The retainers of the Mito Domain who took part in the Tengutō Rebellion are buried）
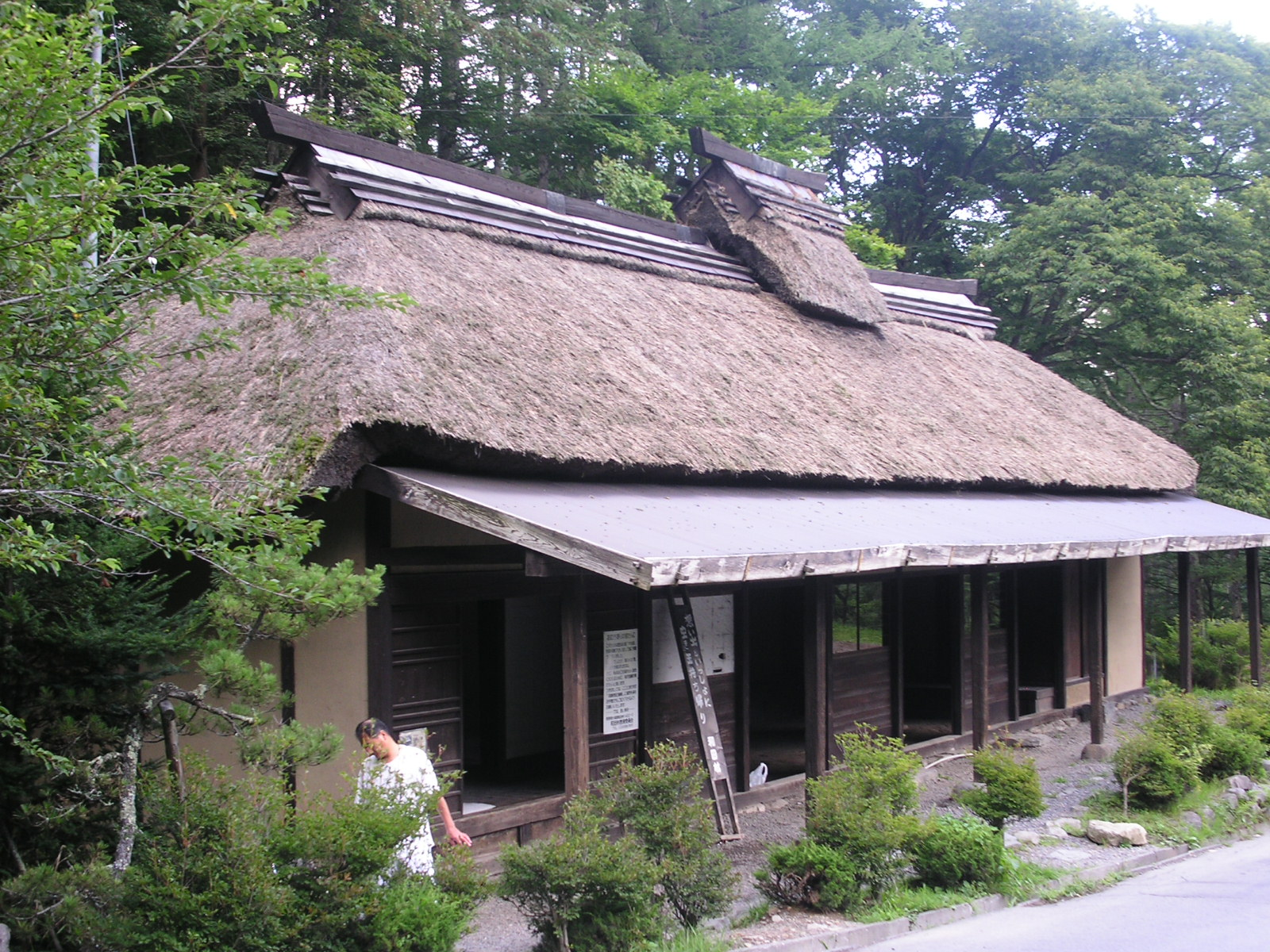
Wada-shuku

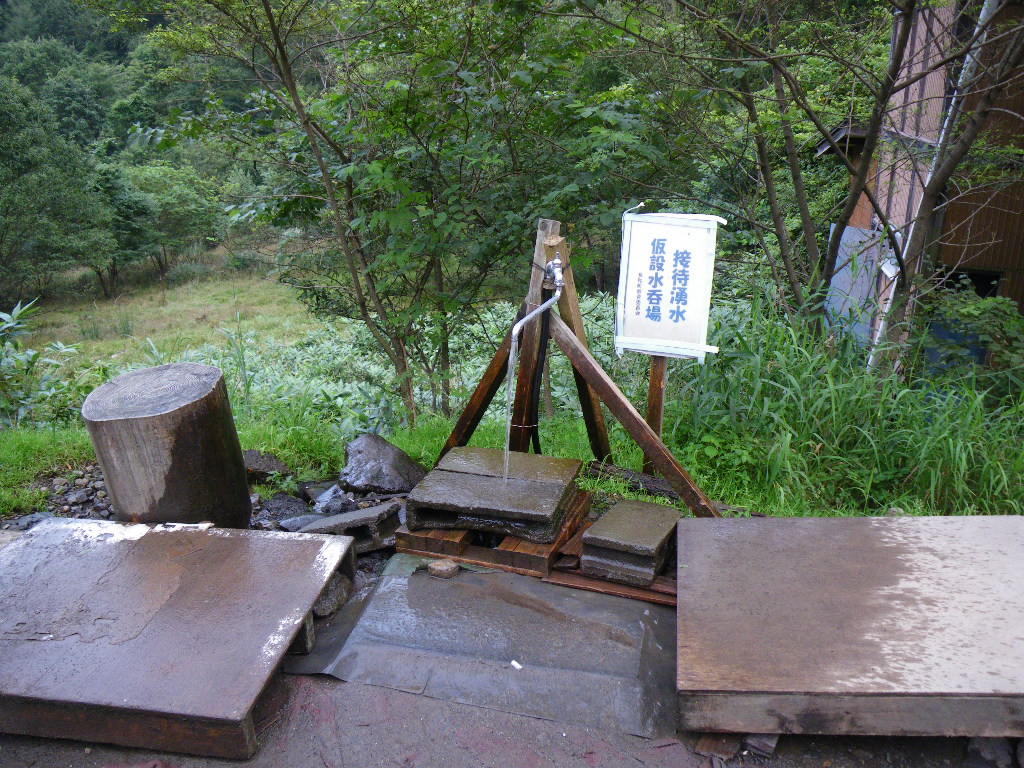
Settai (A well which had been used until recently)

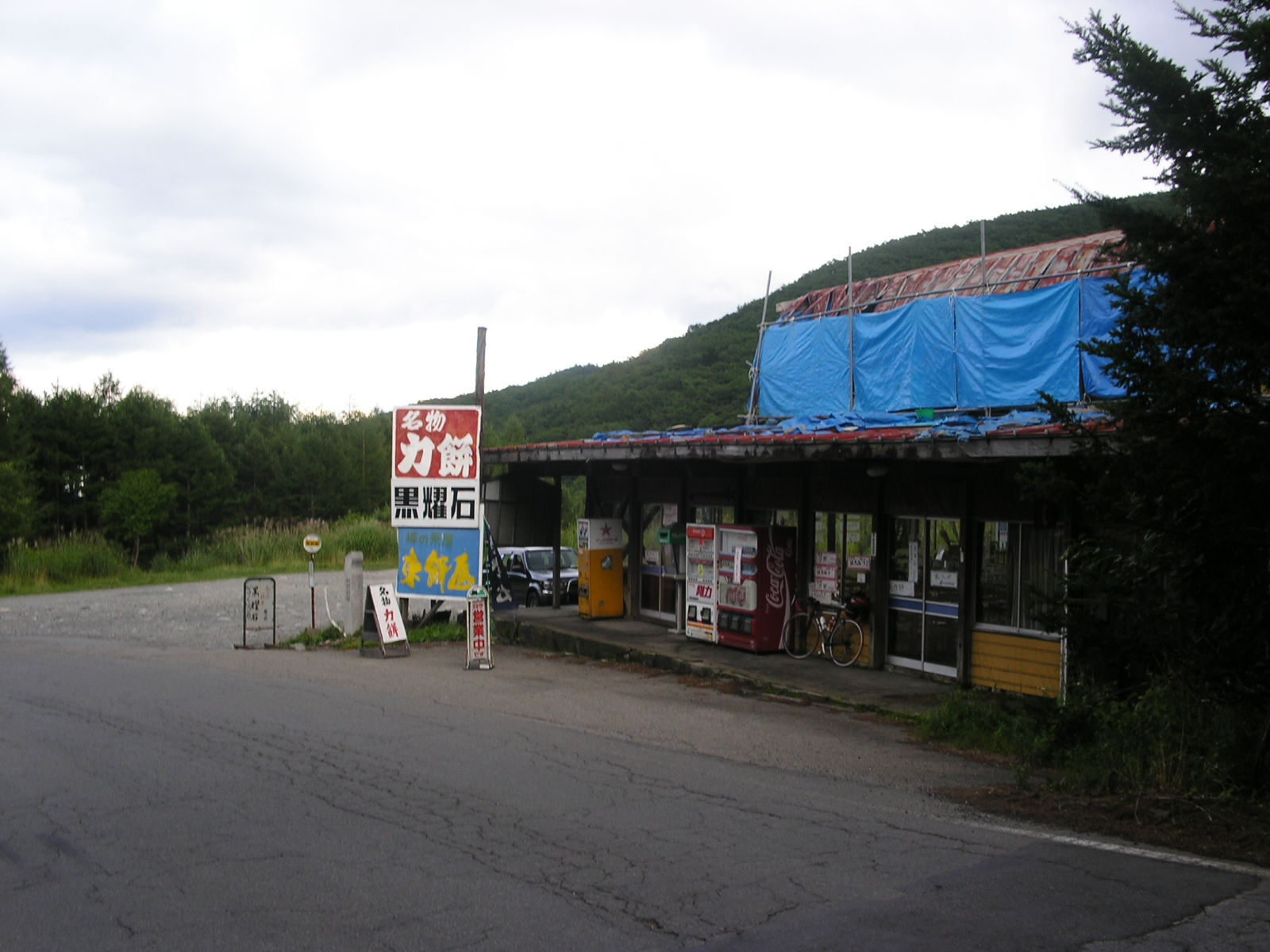
Higashi Mochiya (Now, there is not any hotel and rest house)

== Others ==
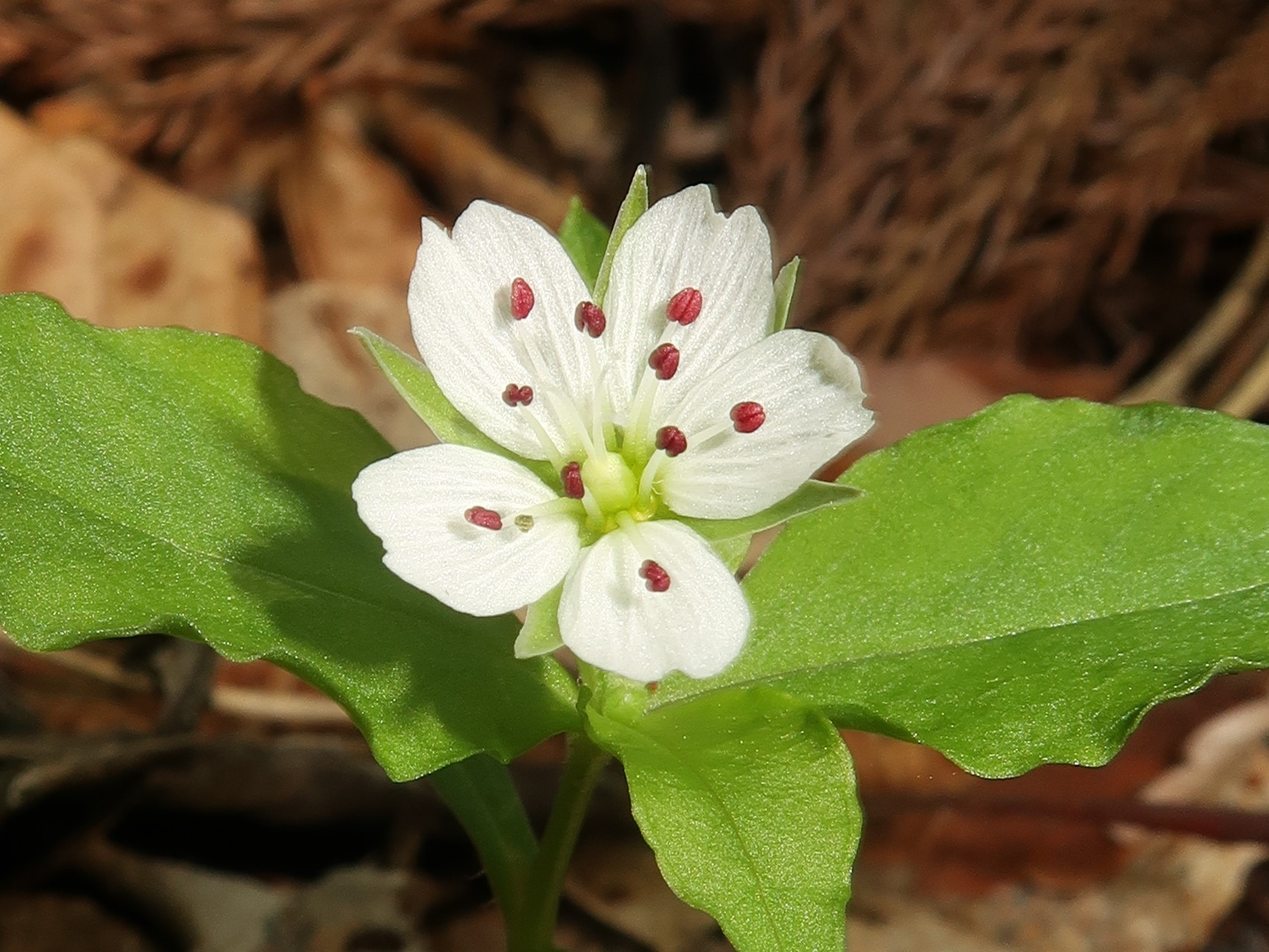
Wadaso

"Wadaso" which belongs to Dianthus is named because it was found around Wada Pass。

== Adjacent post stations ==
Nakasendō

Nihombashi Direction ← Wada-shuku - （Wada Pass） - Shimosuwa-shuku → Sanjō Ōhashi Direction

== Access ==
Toyohashi bus stop

Forty five minutes' walk will bring you to the bus stop, it is located near "Roninzuka"

- Shimosuwa Community Bus
  - For Shimo-Suwa Station

Tobira Sanso mae bus stop

Two hours' walk will bring you to the bus stop

- Alpico Kotsu
  - For Matsumoto Bus Terminal

Kannonzawa bus stop

Fifty five minutes' walk will bring to the bus stop

- Nagawa Community Bus
  - For Ueda Station (Nagano) via Tateshina Highschool and Oya Station (Nagano)

== See also ==
- Tengutō Rebellion
- Tsutomu Hata (His grandfather is "Sadayoshi Hata" who managed 和田嶺自動車 that was operated around Wada Pass)
