= Echigo Plain =

Plain in Niigata Prefecture, Japan

Location of Echigo Plain

Echigo Plain (Japanese: 越後平野) or Niigata Plain (Japanese: 新潟平野) is an alluvial plain that extends from central to northern Niigata Prefecture in Japan. The area of the plain is approximately 2000km^{2}. It is the largest rice-growing area in Japan. The plain was formed by the Agano and Shinano rivers.
