= Sai River (Nagano) =

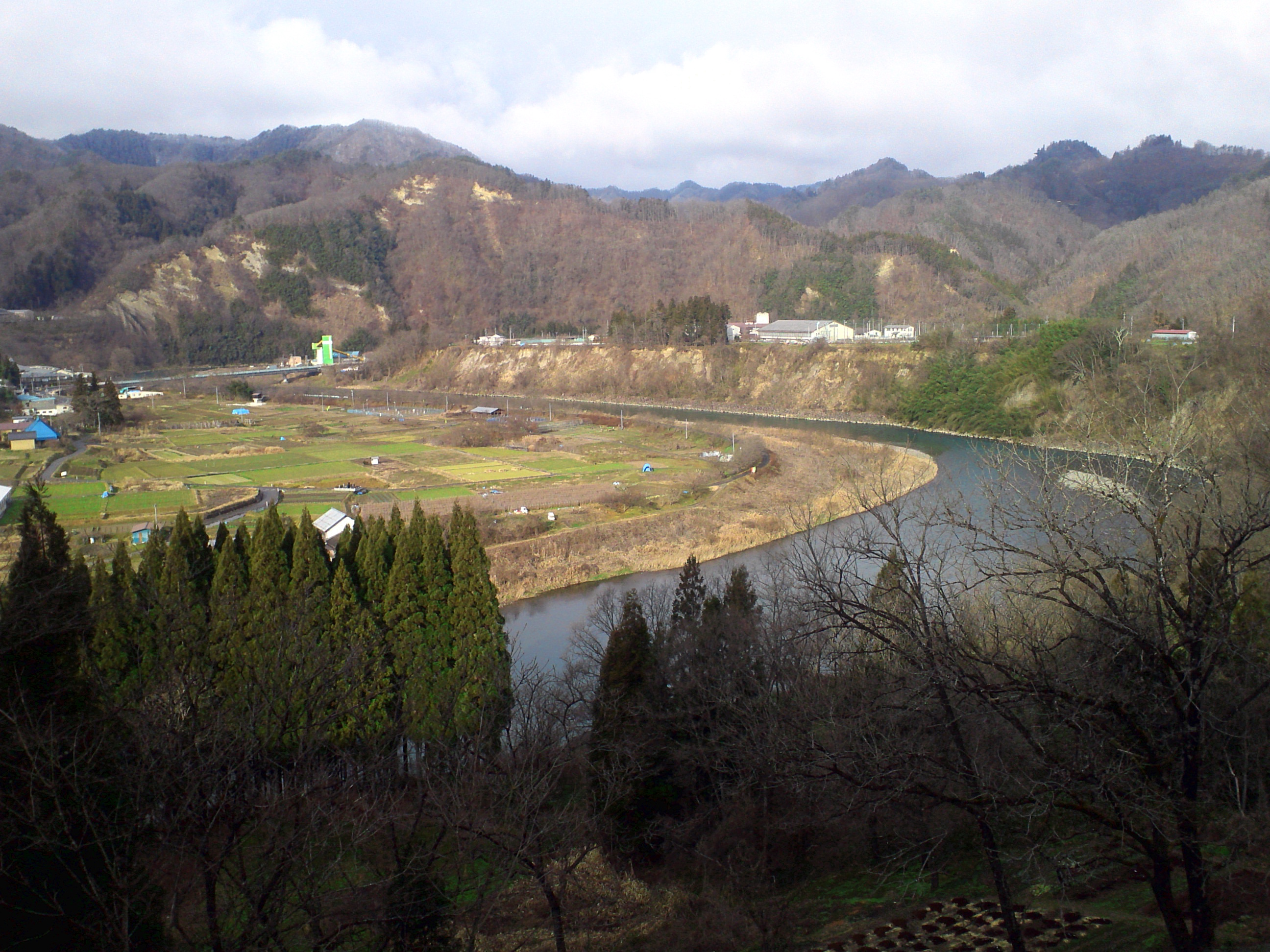

- Location within Japan
- Native name: 犀川 (Japanese)

Location
- Country: Japan
- Prefectures: Nagano
- Cities: Nagano, Azumino, Matsumoto

Physical characteristics
- Source
  - coordinates: 36.2812°N 137.9464°E
- Mouth: Shinano River
  - location: Nagano
  - coordinates: 36.6253°N 138.2483°E
- Length: 153 km (95 mi)
- Basin size: 2,773 km^{2} (1,071 sq mi)

The Sai River (犀川, Sai-gawa), is a river in Japan, located in northeastern Honshu and flowing generally northeast through Nagano Prefecture. It is a tributary of Shinano River, the longest river in Japan.

The Sai River is 153 km long with a watershed of 2773 sq km, and has its source at the confluence of rivers Azusa and Narai in Matsumoto city.
