= Japan National Route 142 =

Road in Japan

National Route 142
- 国道142号
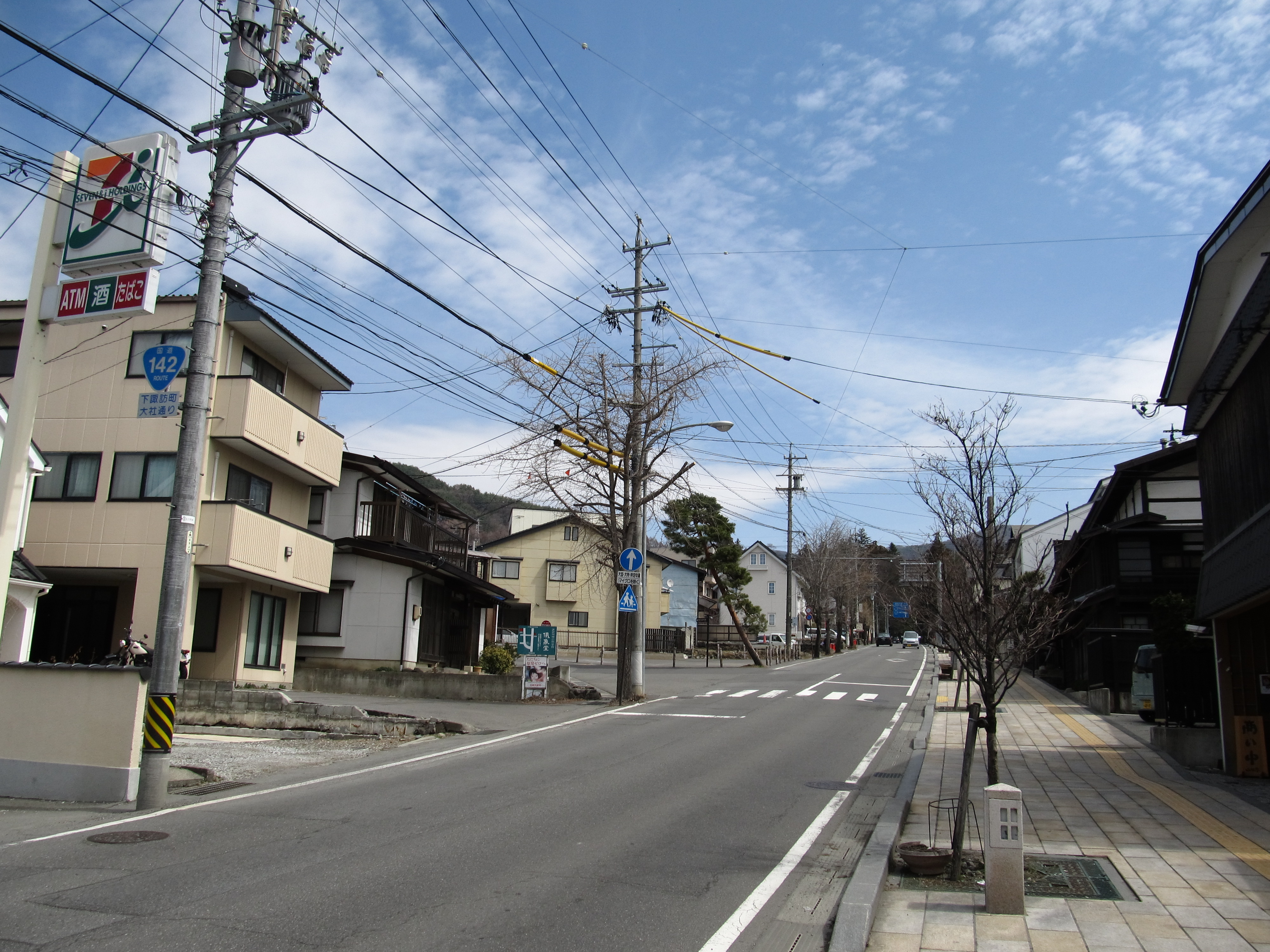
- Route 142 in Shimosuwa

Route information
- Length: 77.3 km (48.0 mi)
- Existed: 1953–present

Major junctions
- West end: National Route 20 in Shimosuwa, Nagano
- East end: National Route 18 / National Route 146 in Karuizawa, Nagano

Location
- Country: Japan

Highway system
- National highways of Japan; Expressways of Japan
← National Route 141	→ National Route 143

National Route 142 is a national highway of Japan connecting Karuizawa, Nagano and Shimosuwa, Nagano in Japan, with a total length of 77.3 km (48.03 mi).

== Route ==
Wada Pass (Nagano)
