= Azusa River =

River in Chūbu, Japan

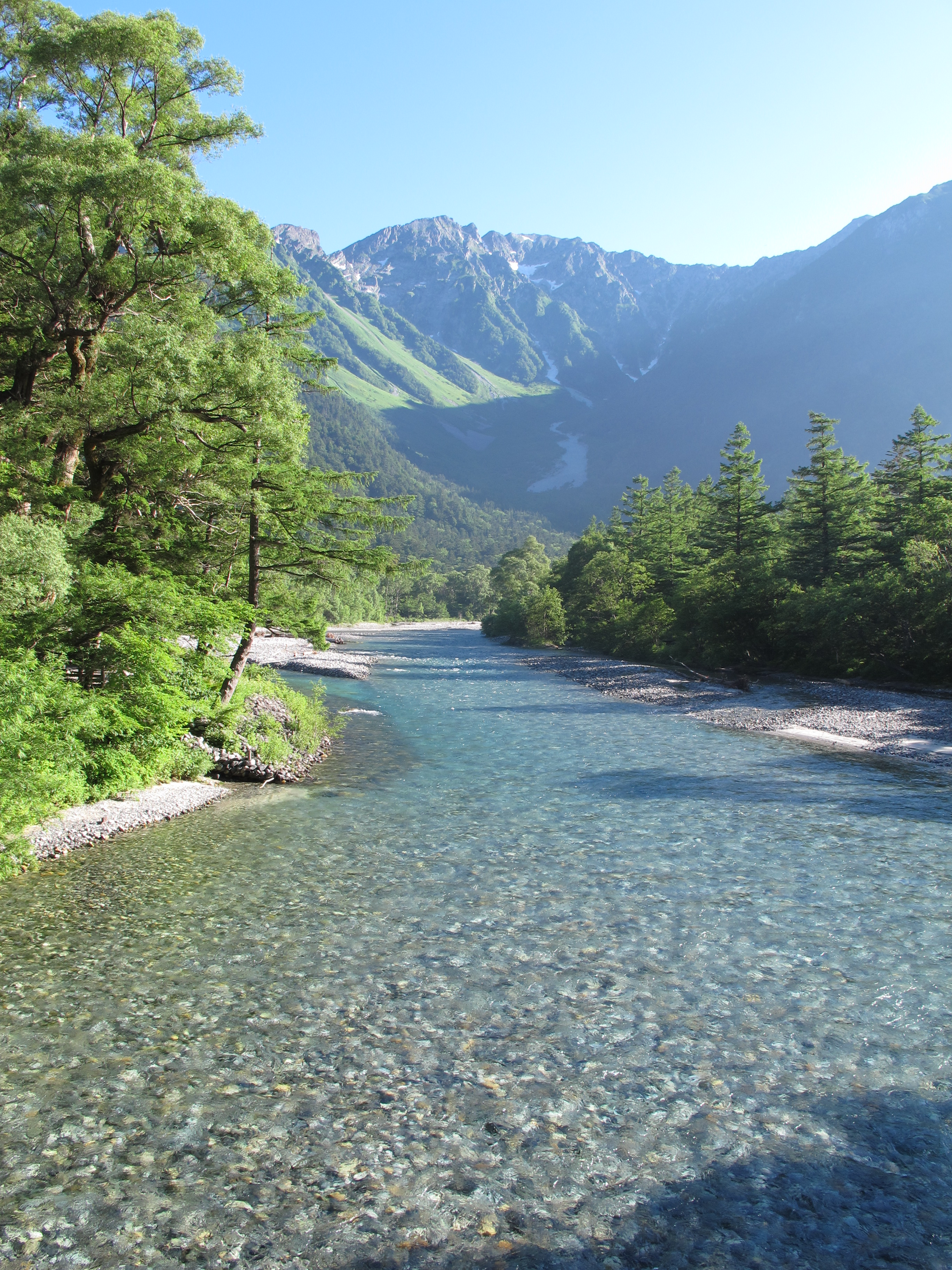
- Azusa river and Mount Hotakadake as seen from Kamikōchi
- Native name: 梓川 (Japanese)

Location
- Country: Japan
- Prefectures: Nagano
- Cities: Matsumoto, Azumino

Physical characteristics
- Source: Mount Yari
  - location: Japanese Alps, Nagano Prefecture
  - coordinates: 36.341944°N 137.6475°E
  - elevation: 3,180 m (10,430 ft)
- Mouth: Narai River
  - location: Matsumoto
  - coordinates: 36.280226°N 137.946439°E
  - elevation: 559 m (1,834 ft)
- Length: 65 km (40 mi)
- Basin size: 559 km^{2} (216 sq mi)

The Azusa River (梓川, Azusa-gawa) is a river within the Hida Mountains or Northern Japanese Alps, in the western region of Nagano Prefecture, Japan. The river belongs to the Shinano River watershed, and forms the upper section of the Sai River. The name of the river comes from the catalpa (梓, azusa, shi) tree found in the river basin, which are used for Azusa Yumi, a sacred bow in Shinto rituals. The river gives its name to the Azusa limited express train, which is operated by the East Japan Railway Company (JR East), and which runs mainly between Shinjuku Station in Tokyo and Matsumoto Station in Nagano.

== Geography ==
The Azusa River is 65 km long with a watershed of 559 sq km, and has its source on the southeastern slope of Mount Yari in the Chūbu-Sangaku National Park. The river flows through the Kamikōchi (上高地, Upper Highlands) valley - designated as one of Japan's National Cultural Assets, on the list of Special Natural Monuments and Special Places of Scenic Beauty. Water from the upper reaches of Karasawa Cirque flows through Hontani and joins the Azusa River near Yokō. From here the river continues through Kamikōchi, under Kappa Bridge (河童橋, Kappa bashi), and then flows through Taisho Pond (大正池, Taishō ike), formed in 1915 following the eruption of Mount Yake, an active volcano in the Hida Mountains. The river then flows northeast through the cities of Azumino and Matsumoto, where it joins the Narai River near Azumino, Nagano, from where it becomes the Sai River, the most important tributary of the Shinano River, Japan's longest river.

The river and its tributaries flow from or past several of the 100 Famous Japanese Mountains including Mount Yari, Mount Hotakadake, and Mount Yake.

The Kamikōchi Line, a private railway in Matsumoto, follows the general course of the Azusa River between Shimonii Station and Shinshimashima Station.

== Water Usage ==
=== Sericulture ===
In his 1896 book, Mountaineering and Exploration in the Japanese Alps, the English missionary and mountaineer Walter Weston wrote that the Azusa River was used to power machinery used in sericulture, "The simple machinery for winding off the silk from the cocoons is water powered and gives employment to a score of bright-faced girls, varying from twelve to twenty years of age."

=== Hydroelectricity ===
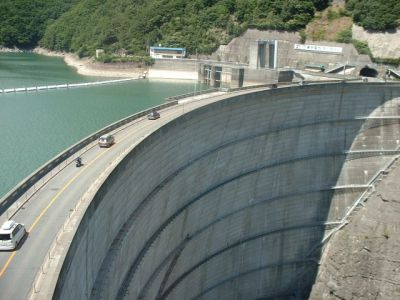
Rte 158 runs across Nagawado Dam, with manmade Azusa Lake on the left

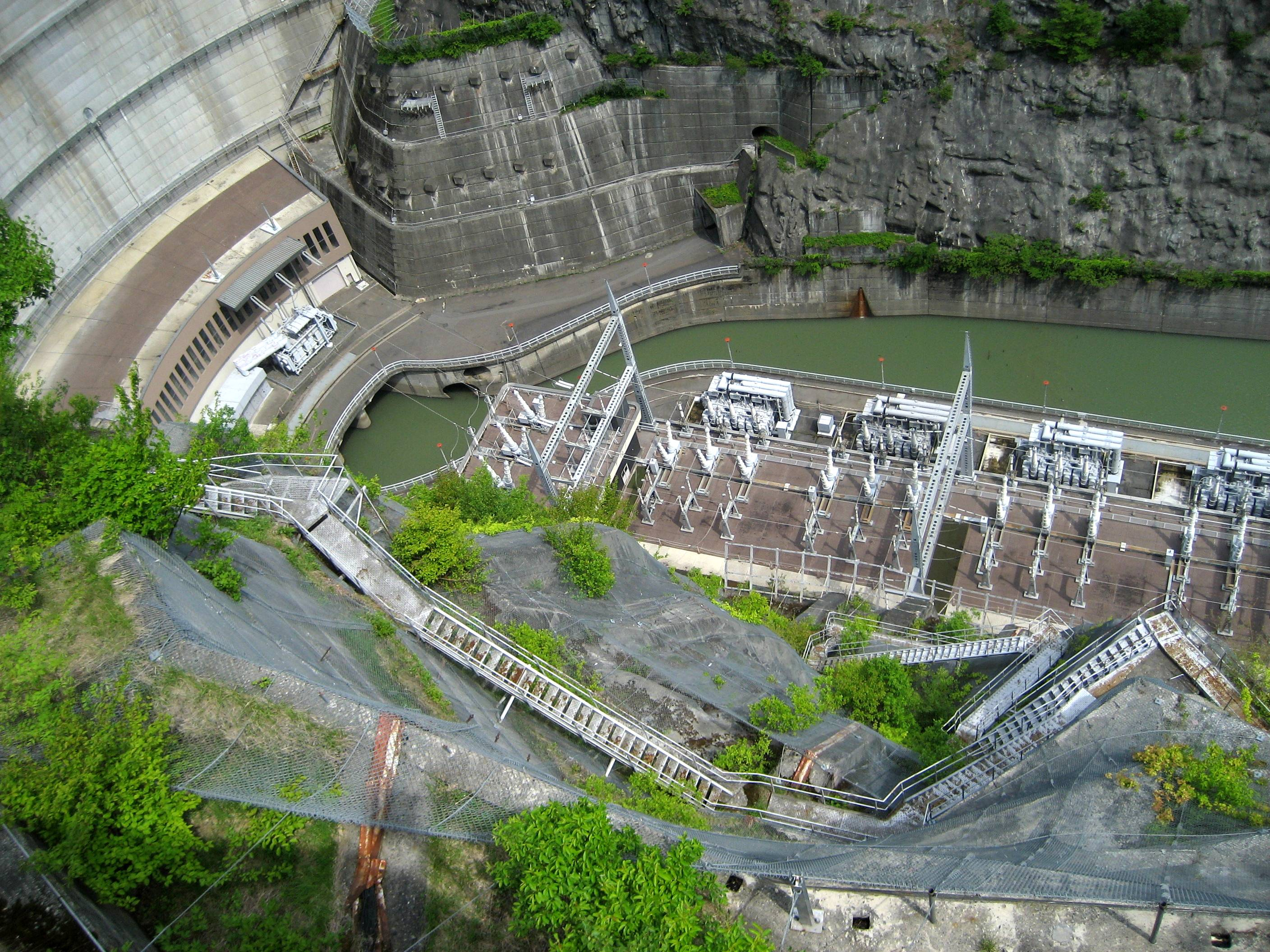
Azumi Power Station at the Nagawado Dam

Several dams are operated by Tokyo Electric Power Company, or TEPCO, along the river, including: the Nagawado Dam, the largest, which holds 123×10^{6} cubic metres (4.3×10^{9} cu ft); Midono Dam; and the Inekoki Dam. The dams use pumped-storage hydroelectricity, and are collectively referred to as the Azusagawa 3 dams.

=== Irrigation ===
Several weirs, canals, and underground channels draw water from the Azusa River that are used for irrigation, including for wasabi farming in Azumino. The Wada Weir is thought to have been completed in 973.

== See also ==
- Chūbu-Sangaku National Park
- Kamikochi
- List of rivers of Japan
- Nagano Prefecture
