= Susobana Dam =

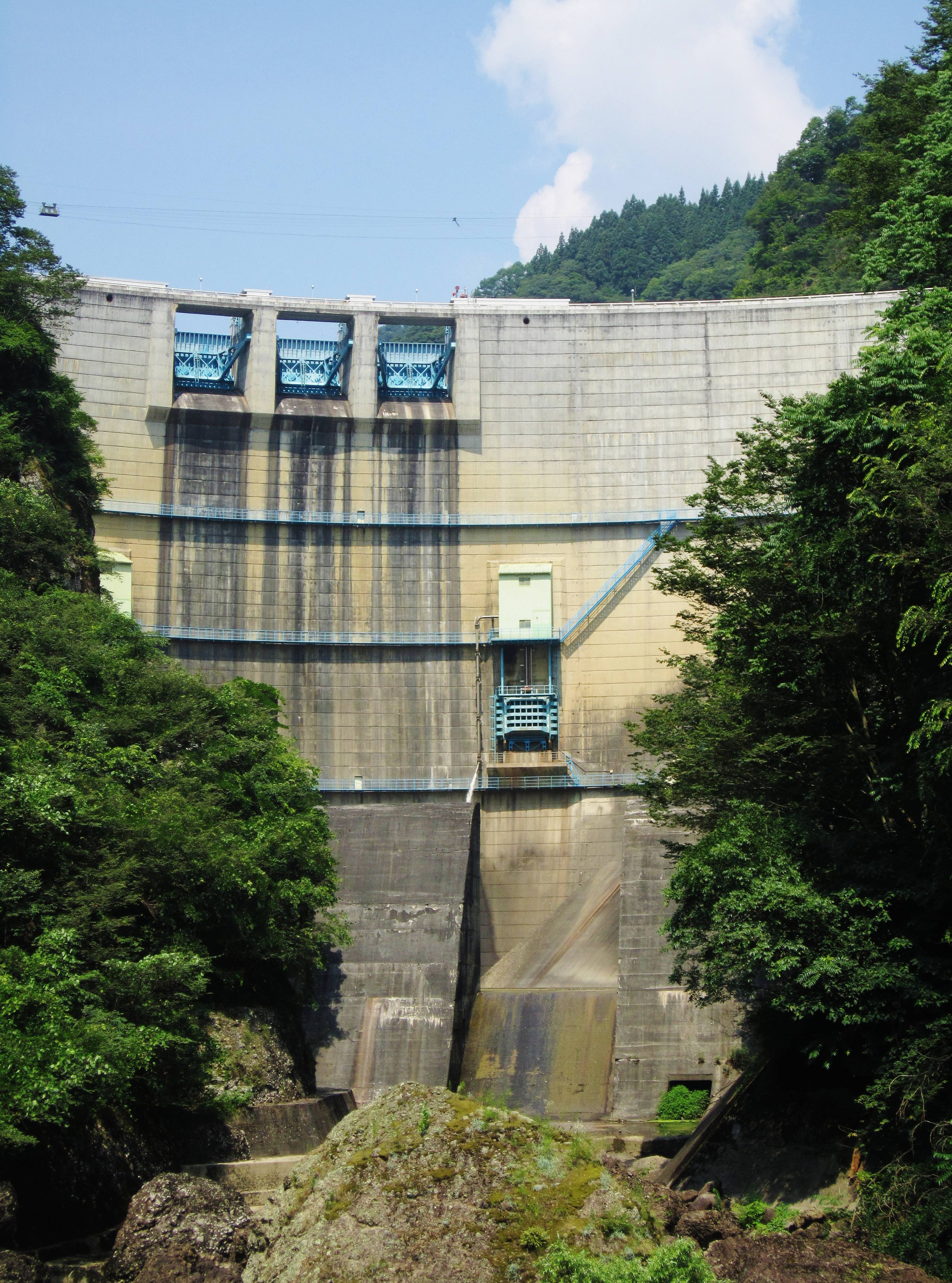
- Interactive map of Susobana Dam
- Location: Nagano Prefecture, Japan
- Coordinates: 36°40′06″N 138°07′12″E
- Construction began: 1962
- Opening date: 1969

Susobana Dam (Japanese: 裾花ダム) is a dam in the Nagano Prefecture, Japan, completed in 1969.
