= Motovlog =

Video blog filmed on a motor vehicle

A motovlog is a type of video log recorded by a person while riding a motorcycle or any motorized vehicle. The word is a neologism and portmanteau derived from "motorcycle", "video" and "log".

A rider who creates video blogs known as a motorcycle blogger, and the action of making motovlogs is called motovlogging. Most motovloggers upload their videos on YouTube, and the network of motovloggers here is known as the motovloggers community.

== YouTube ==
There are many channels on YouTube dedicated to motovlogging. Many motovloggers do not show their face or the license plate of their motorcycle in videos. The British motovlogger, BaronVonGrumble, stated in an interview that anonymity exists to make the videos more mysterious and exciting to watch.

Motovloggers have occasionally captured traffic accidents while riding with the camera running. There are also videos of motovloggers helping out randomly encountered people.

Sometimes, motovloggers encounter road rage and the vlog becomes digital proof which could be used as evidence.
