= Midono Dam =

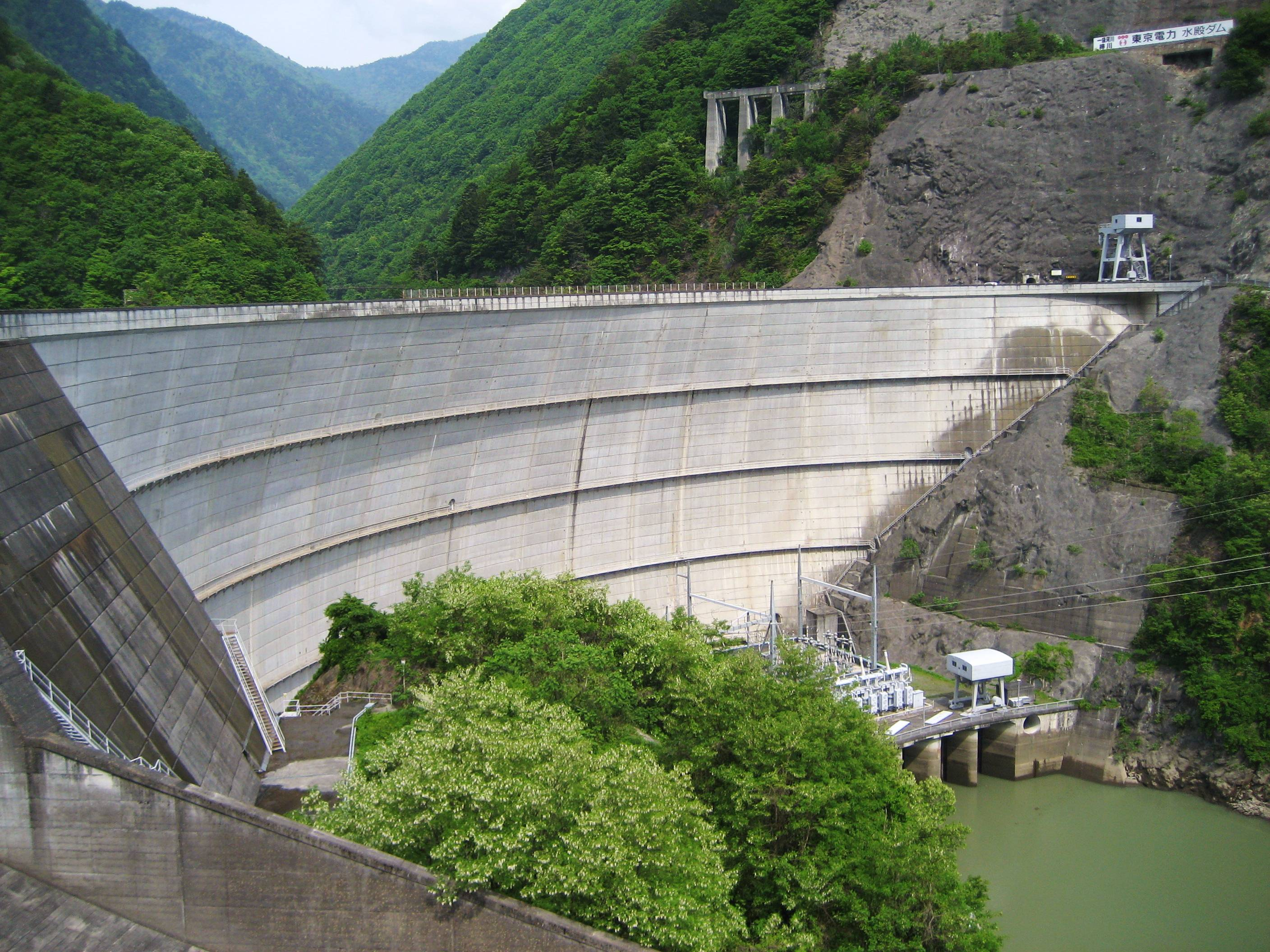
- Interactive map of Midono Dam
- Location: Nagano Prefecture, Japan
- Coordinates: 36°09′14″N 137°44′53″E

Midono Dam (Japanese: 水殿ダム) is a dam on the Azusa River in the Nagano Prefecture, Japan, completed in 1969.
