= Inekoki Dam =

Coordinates: 36°10′06″N 137°46′16″E

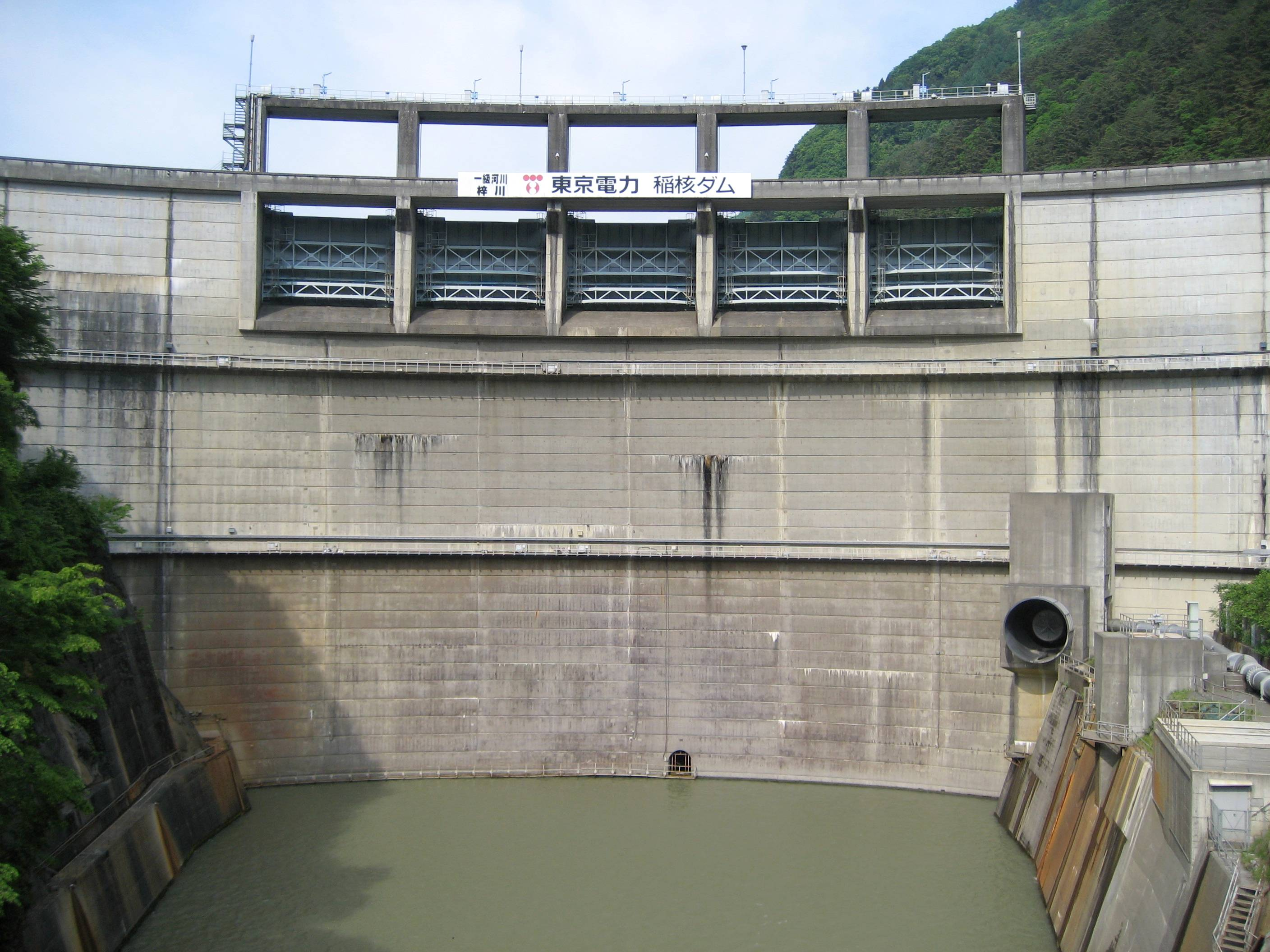
- Interactive map of Inekoki Dam
- Location: Matsumoto, Nagano, Japan
- Construction began: 1965
- Opening date: 1968

Dam and spillways
- Height: 60 m (200 ft)
- Length: 192.8 m (633 ft)
- Dam volume: 65,000 m^{3}

Reservoir
- Total capacity: 10,700,000 m^{3}
- Catchment area: 444.9 km^{2}
- Surface area: 51 ha

Inekoki Dam (稲核ダム, Inekoki damu) is a dam along the Azusa River in Matsumoto, Nagano Prefecture, Japan, completed in 1968.
