= Uono River =

River in Niigata Prefecture, Japan

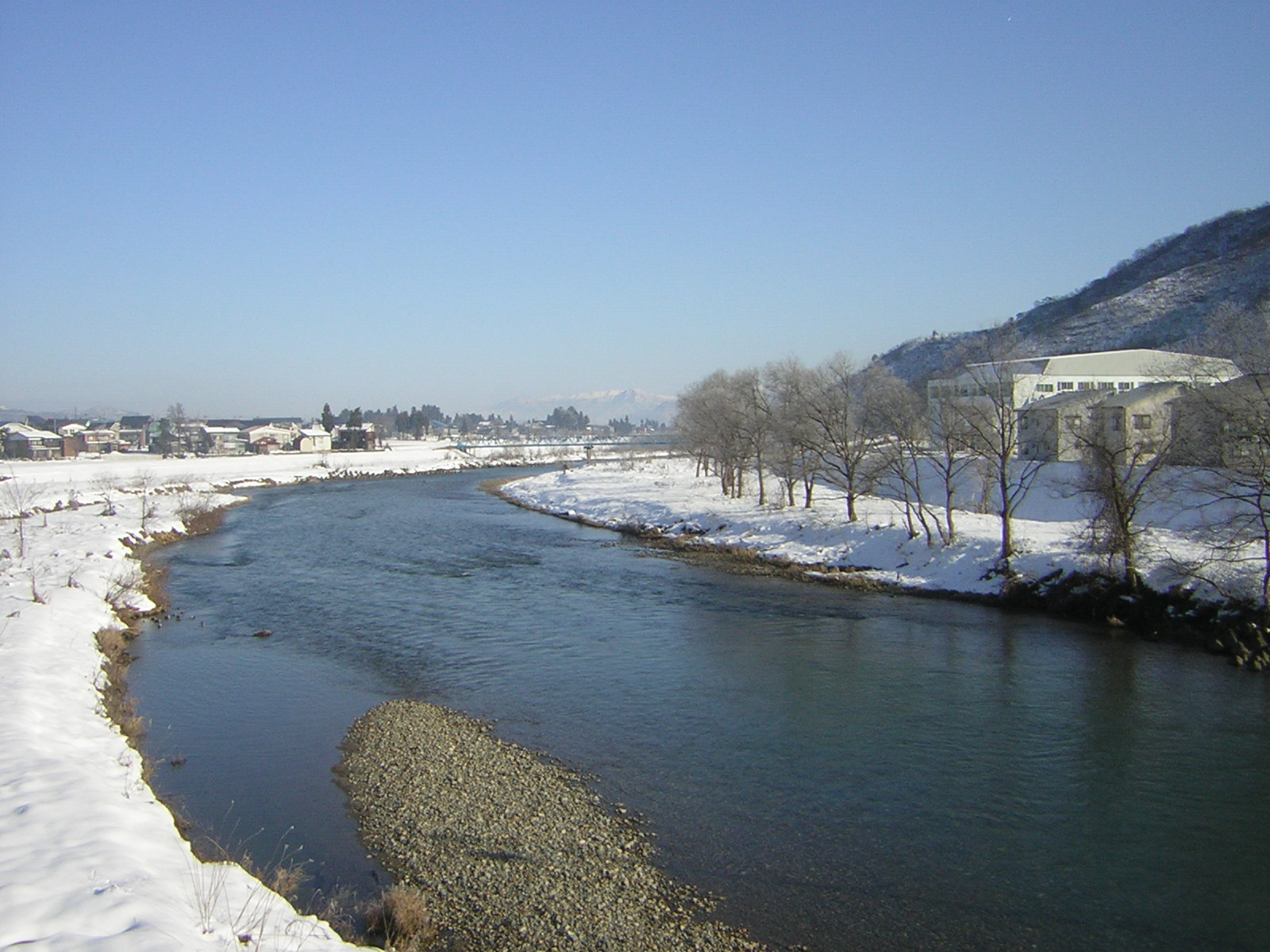

- Location within Japan
- Native name: 魚野川 (Japanese)

Location
- Country: Japan
- Prefectures: Niigata

Physical characteristics
- Source
  - coordinates: 36.8372°N 138.9138°E
- Mouth: Shinano River
  - location: Nagaoka
  - coordinates: 37.2715°N 138.8552°E
- Length: 66.7 km (41.4 mi)
- Basin size: 1,519 km^{2} (586 sq mi)
- Discharge
  - location: Horinouchi
  - average: 157 m3/s

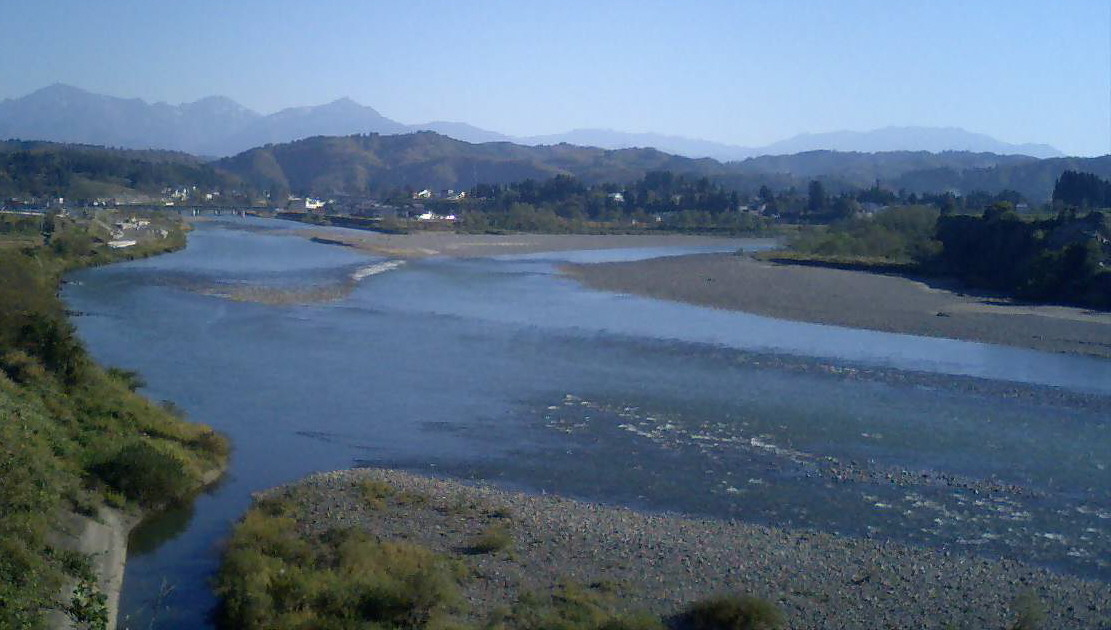
The confluence of the Uono and Shinano Rivers

The Uono River (魚野川, Uono-gawa) is a river in Niigata Prefecture in Japan. It flows into the Shinano River, which is the longest in Japan.

The river is 66.7 km long, its basin size is 1519 km². The average stream slope is 1/49. The average discharge at Horinouchi is 157 m^{3}/s.
