= Shinano River =

River in Chūbu, Japan

Shinano River Chikuma River (千曲川)
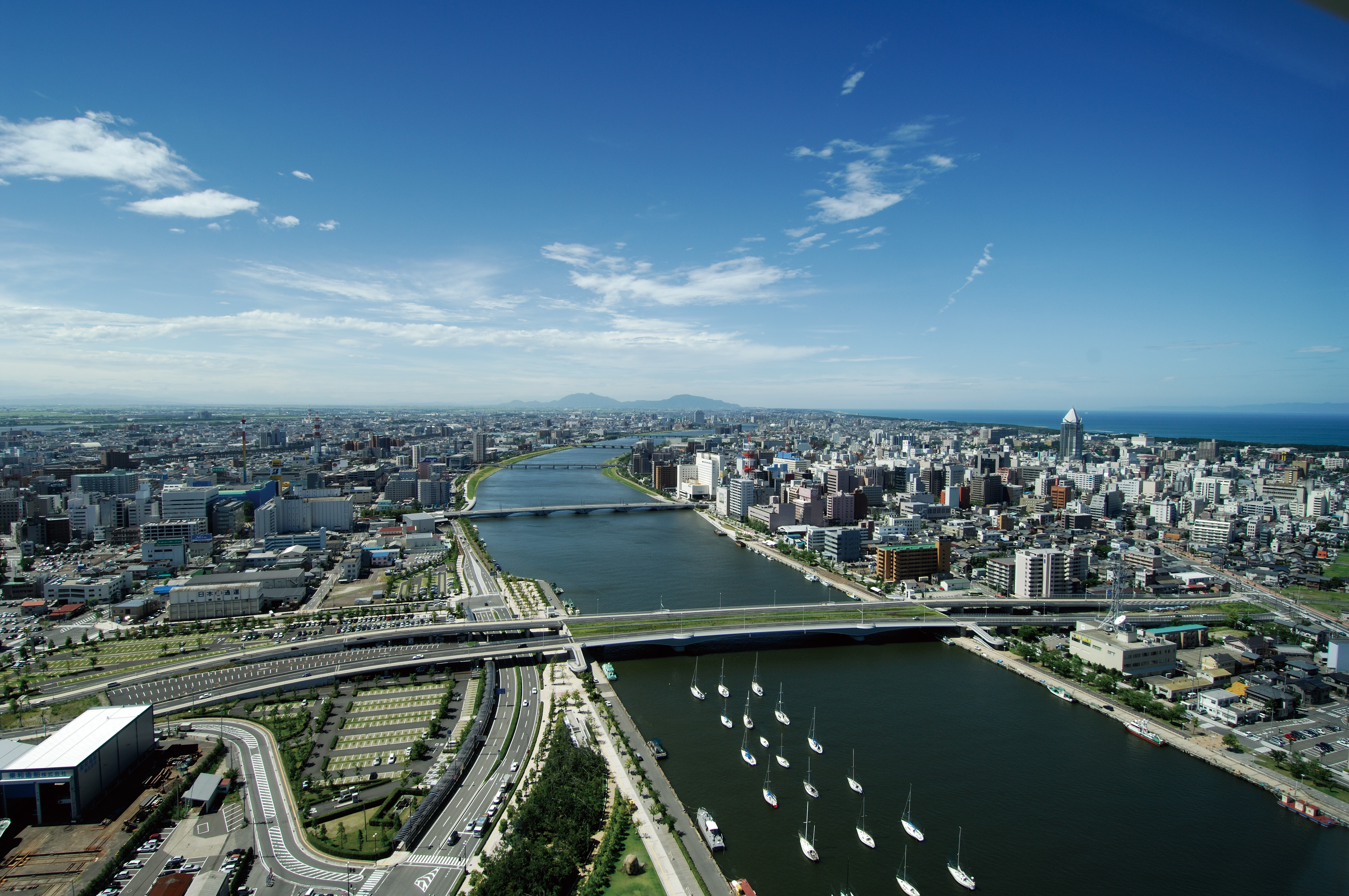
- The Shinano River in Niigata just before it flows into the Sea of Japan
- Native name: 信濃川 (Japanese)

Location
- Country: Japan
- Prefectures: Nagano, Niigata
- Cities: Niigata, Nagaoka, Nagano, Matsumoto

Physical characteristics
- Source: Mount Kobushi
  - location: Japanese Alps, Nagano Prefecture
  - coordinates: 35.913°N 138.7194°E
  - elevation: 2,475 m (8,120 ft)
- Mouth: Sea of Japan
  - location: Niigata Prefecture
  - elevation: 0 m (0 ft)
- Length: 367 km (228 mi)
- Basin size: 11,900 km^{2} (4,600 sq mi)
- Discharge
  - location: Ojiya
  - average: 503 m^{3}/s (17,800 cu ft/s)
  - minimum: 91 m^{3}/s (3,200 cu ft/s)
  - maximum: 3,776 m^{3}/s (133,300 cu ft/s)

Basin features
- Tributaries
  - left: Urano River, Sai River (Nagano)
  - right: Yu River (Nagano), Hoshina River, Ayu River, Yagisawa River, Matsu River, Uono River

The Shinano River (信濃川, Shinano-gawa), known as the Chikuma River (千曲川, Chikuma-gawa) in its upper reaches, is the longest and widest river in Japan and the third largest by basin area (behind the Tone River and Ishikari River). It is located in northeastern Honshu, rising in the Japanese Alps and flowing generally northeast through Nagano and Niigata Prefectures before emptying into the Sea of Japan. It is designated as a Class A river.

== History ==
The Shinano River has a long history in Honshu, and along with other rivers in the region, has a significant effect on the geography and ecology of the area. Originally, the Shinano River would have drained straight into an estuary-like Fukushima lagoon before making its way into the Sea of Japan after flowing down from the Japanese Alps. Over centuries of sediments being brought downstream, a marshy plain formed in the lagoon into what is currently the Echigo Plain. Estimates presented in 1993 place the amount of loose sediment in the river system at 400–500 cubic metres per kilometre (840–1,050 cu yd/mi). The construction of diversion channels have limited the upkeep required to keep a navigable passage between the Niigata port and the open ocean; however, a consequence of diverting sediment has been that the northern coast of Niigata Prefecture (which includes Niigata and its port) is receding by an average 9 cubic metres per metre (97 cu ft/ft) per year (measured from 1947 to 1975) due to sediment being released well-south of the river's original mouth in Niigata.

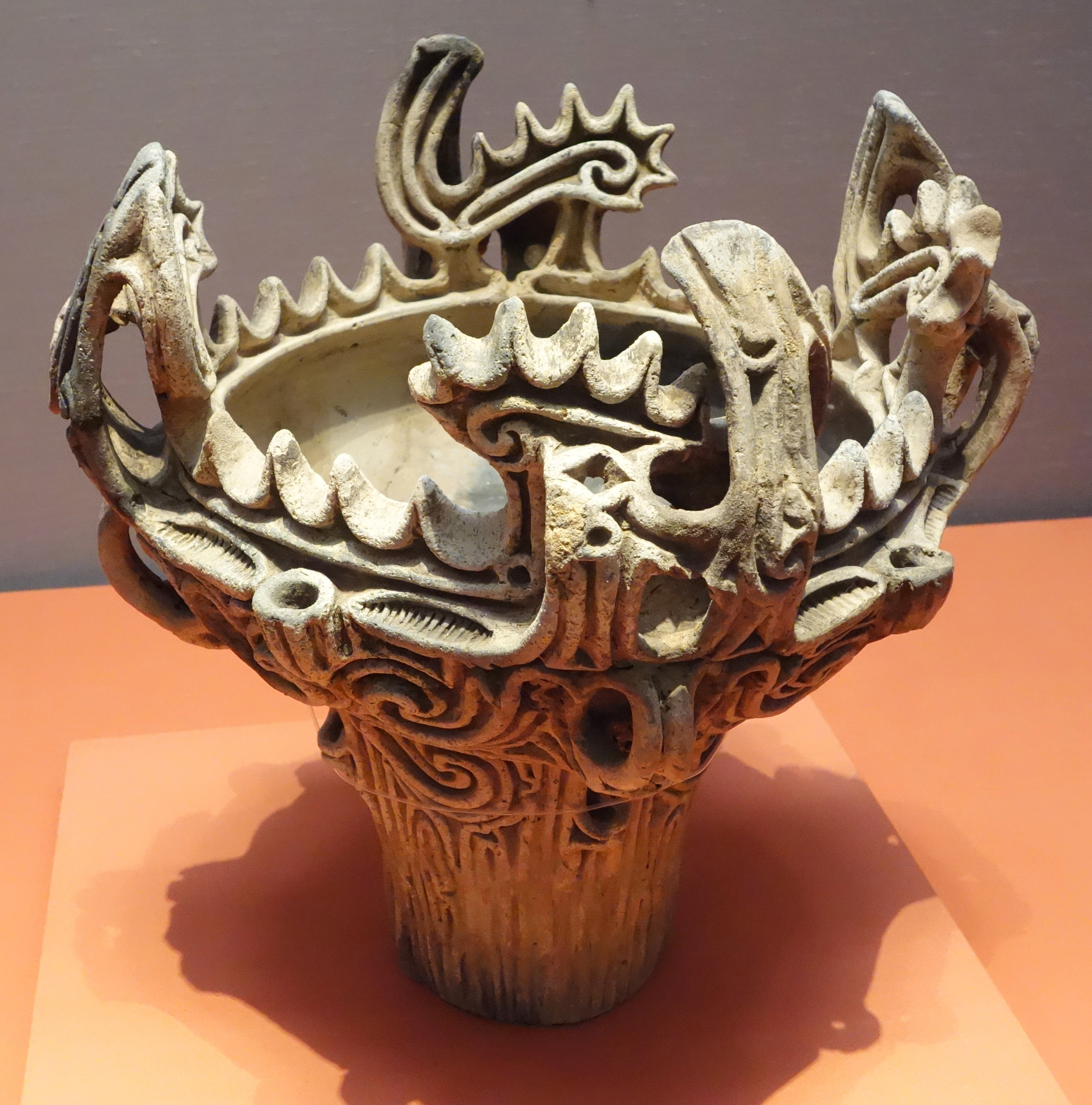
Flame-style pottery from the Nagaoka site

The Shinano River Project, funded by the British Academy, investigates the development of the Shinano—Chikuma River system. It has uncovered some of the earliest examples of Flame-style pottery (kaen doki), dating from the Middle Jōmon period (3500–2500 BCE), found at Sanka excavation site in Nagaoka, Niigata, near the confluence of the Sai and Shinano Rivers.

As with rivers across the world, the Shinano provided a valuable means of transport. The system also provided a method of transport for goods to be moved downstream to one of three ports, Nutaru, Niigata and the provincial port of Kambara. Little evidence remains which details the importance or role of these ports; however, large amounts of Medieval Chinese artefacts have been found in the region, and the Muromachi period play, Miuri, was set in Kambara, indicating its regional significance. There is limited evidence which has caused some historians (such as Shishi Tokamachi) to suggest that the Shinano system was not widely used for boat travel until the eighteenth century. Brian Goldsmith, however, contends that the Shinano was, in fact, used for waterborne trade based on archaeological finds, including coin hoards and imported pottery, found in the headwaters of the Shinano. One of the main inland roads in Honshu followed the Shinano valley inland to the Japanese Alps. The location of the road indicates that the river played a vital role in local trade. The Chikuma valley also provided a link across the island of Honshu.

The confluence of the Chikuma and Sai rivers, called the Kawanakajima Plain, was the location a series of battles in the sixteenth century as part of the Sengoku period. The most significant of the battles was fought on 18 October 1561 between the Takeda clan and Uesugi clan, and resulted in severe casualties to both sides. The battles have become well known in Japanese military history, mentioned in literature, woodblock printing and movies.

The Shinano River system has a long history of hydroelectric power generation, with the first hydroelectric power plant in Japan being located in the system. During the construction of a plant on the Shinano River in the Niigata Prefecture in July 1922, it was reported by Tokyo's Yomiuri Shimbun on 29 July that Korean workers were being mistreated and murdered. The Shinano River incident involved 1,200 workers, approximately 600 of whom were Korean, who were subjected to regular mistreatment by their Japanese foremen. The mistreatment included malnutrition, forced labour up to sixteen hours a day and severe beatings for those who tried to escape. News articles at the time alleged that up to 100 Koreans were killed during construction and that local farmers had reported seeing bodies floating down river. This incident occurred following the annexation of Korea by Japan and was partially responsible for the development of trade unions for Korean workers in Japan.

Two Japanese naval cruisers, one launched in 1911 and the second in 1938, were named after the Chikuma River. A 1940s aircraft carrier was named after the old Shinano Province.

== Course ==
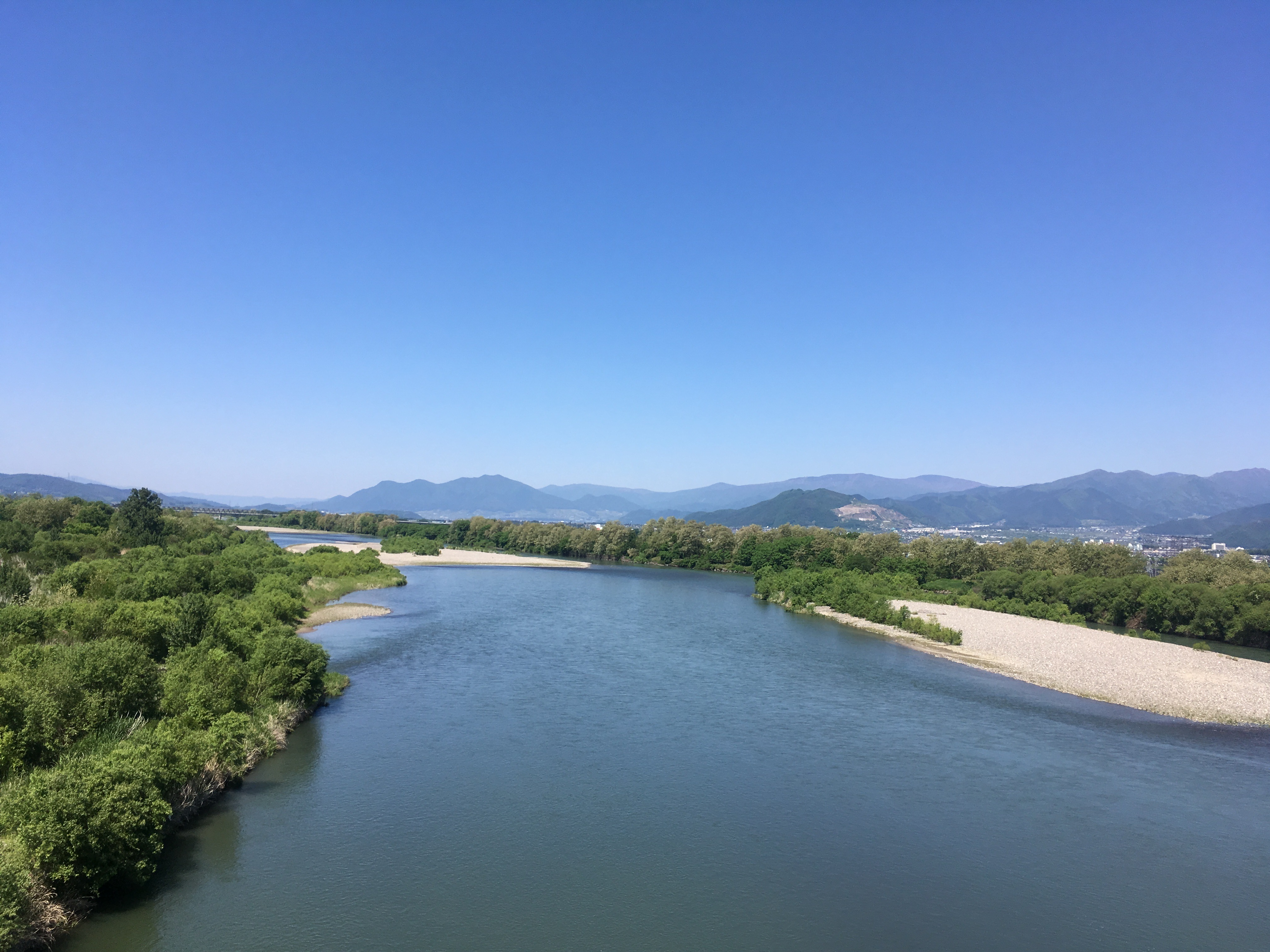
Chikuma River, from Yashima Bridge, looking downstream toward Murayama Bridge, Nagano (city)

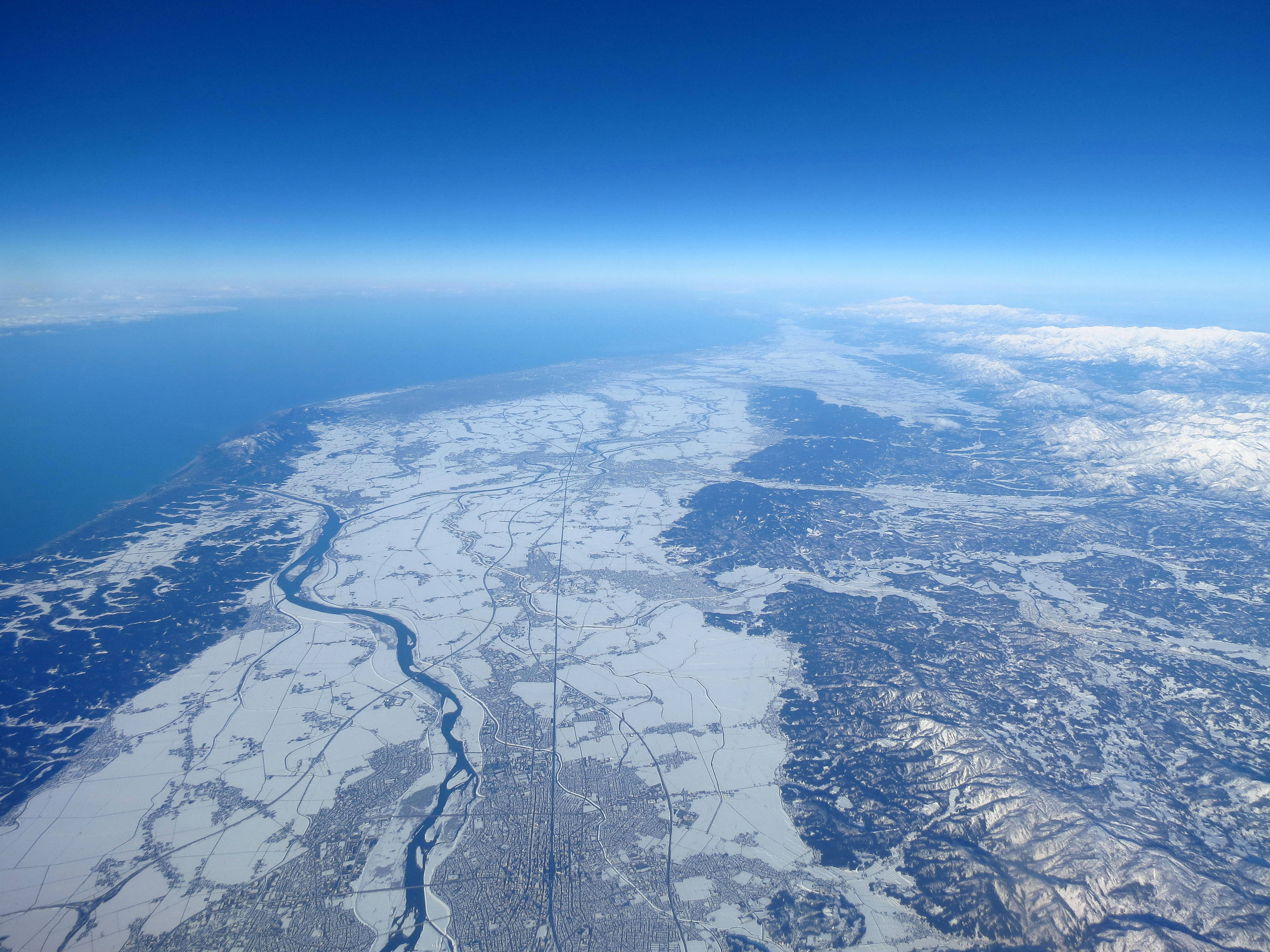
Shinano River and Ōkōzu Channel in Echigo Plain in winter

The Chikuma River rises in the northeastern foothills of Mount Kobushi in the Japanese Alps on the border of Saitama, Yamanashi and Nagano Prefectures, partially in the Chichibu Tama Kai National Park

It joins with the Yochi River and flows roughly north to join the Yu River (36.26°N 138.42°E) then turns northwest into an intermontane basin at Nagano City where it is joined by the Sai River from Matsumoto and the Hoshina River (36.625°N 138.25°E). The Chikuma then changes direction and flows northeast from Nagano into Niigata Prefecture where it changes its name to the Shinano River. The Shinano continues northeast to a confluence with Uono River between Ojiya and Uonuma (37.275°N 138.85°E).

After its confluence with Uono River, the Shinano is crossed by Koshiji Bridge and the Shinetsu train line before emerging onto Echigo Plains of the Niigata Prefecture at Sanjō. After entering the Echigo Plains the river becomes deltaic and swampy due to its very small gradient (an average of 1 in 4000).

The Ōkōzu Channel (大河津分水路, Ōkōzu Bunsuiro), completed in the 1920s, diverts flood water northwest into the Sea of Japan while the river splits into a number of branches and continuing northeast. Approximately 25 kilometres (16 mi) south of its mouth, the river turns north and flows towards Niigata.

The Sekiya Diversion Channel was completed in the 1960s in response to flooding in Niigata continuing after construction of the Ōkōzu Channel. It is designed to mitigate flooding by diverting flood waters away from the city and straight into the Sea of Japan. The river turns northeast and flows through Niigata City for approximately 6 kilometres (3.7 mi) before finally emptying into the Sea of Japan.

The river is crossed multiple times as it meanders its way through Niigata, including by the Bandai Bridge which was, when it was originally built in 1886, the longest bridge in Japan at 782 metres (2,566 ft). The current Bandai Bridge, built in 1929 and designated as a nationally important cultural property, is only 306.9 metres (1,007 ft) long. This is also in stark contrast with the river's 720-metre (2,360 ft) width at the Ohkouzu Diversion Channel.

=== Ōkōzu Diversion Channel ===
Due to seasonal high rainfall in the Shinano's watershed the fertile farmlands on the Niigata plain were subjected to flooding every three to four years which destroyed crops, particularly rice, and villages. Attempts from local residents to secure funding to build a diversion channel began in the mid-early eighteenth century, during the Kyōhō era. Government support was not secured until the early twentieth century following severe flooding and inundation in 1896.

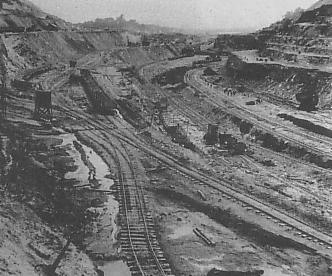
Construction of the Ōkōzu Channel

Construction work on the 10-kilometre-long (6.2 mi) Ōkōzu Channel (大河津分水路, Ōkōzu Bunsuiro) began in 1909 and concluded in 1922. The success of the channel was short-lived, however, as the floodgate collapsed in 1927 due to erosion of the channel bed and was not fully repaired until 1931.

The construction of the diversion channel has resulted in marsh fields drying on the Niigata plain which allows for greater production. Likewise, drier land has also allowed for the construction of infrastructure such as expressways and the Shinkansen express-train network, to support a greater population in the area.

A new weir wall was constructed between 1992 and 2000 due to safety concerns with the original wall. Construction was planned to limit negative affects on scenery and wildlife. To this end, natural stones were used for the exterior and fishways were included in the design.

=== Sekiya Diversion Channel ===
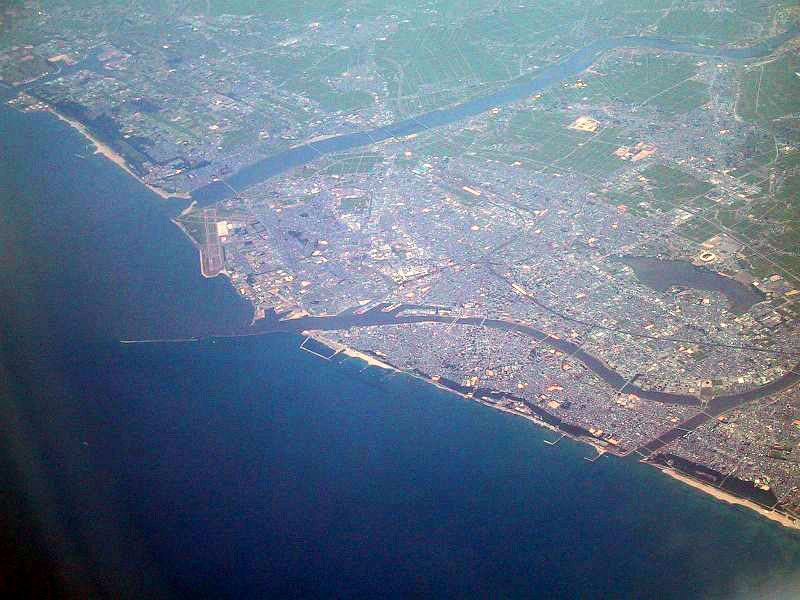
River mouths in Niigata City – from the top: Agano River; Shinano River; Sekiya diversion channel

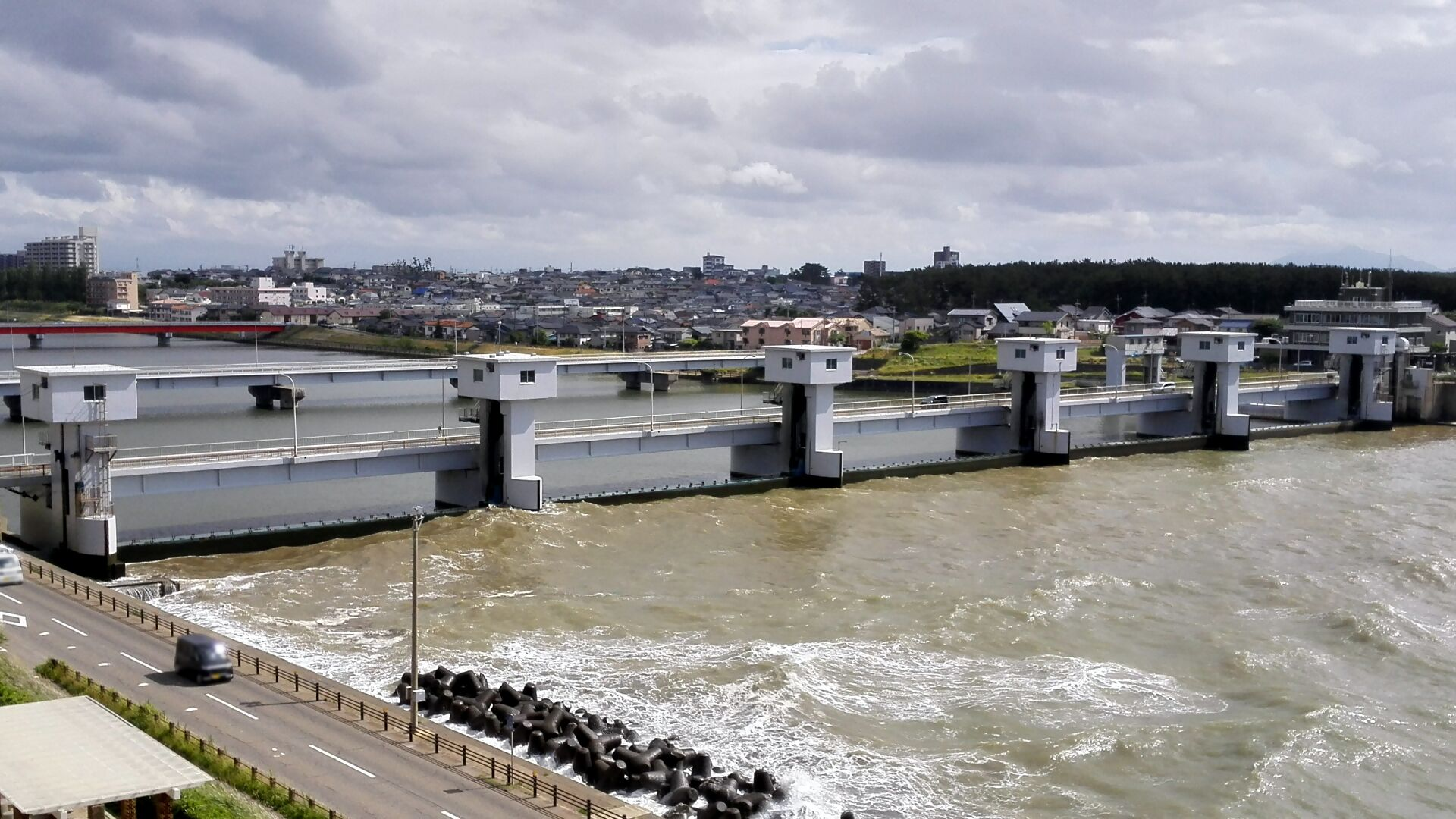
Sekiya ocean gate

Flooding in the Niigata area continued following the construction of the Ōkōzu Channel. As a result, another channel, which was originally planned in the Edo period (1700s–1800s), was built on the western outskirts of Niigata City to further mitigate the risk of flooding and to help prevent saltwater intrusion into the Shinano estuary. The Sekiya Diversion Channel was originally to be funded by the Niigata Prefecture; however the 1964 Niigata earthquake resulted in the funds no longer being available so it was adopted as a national project.

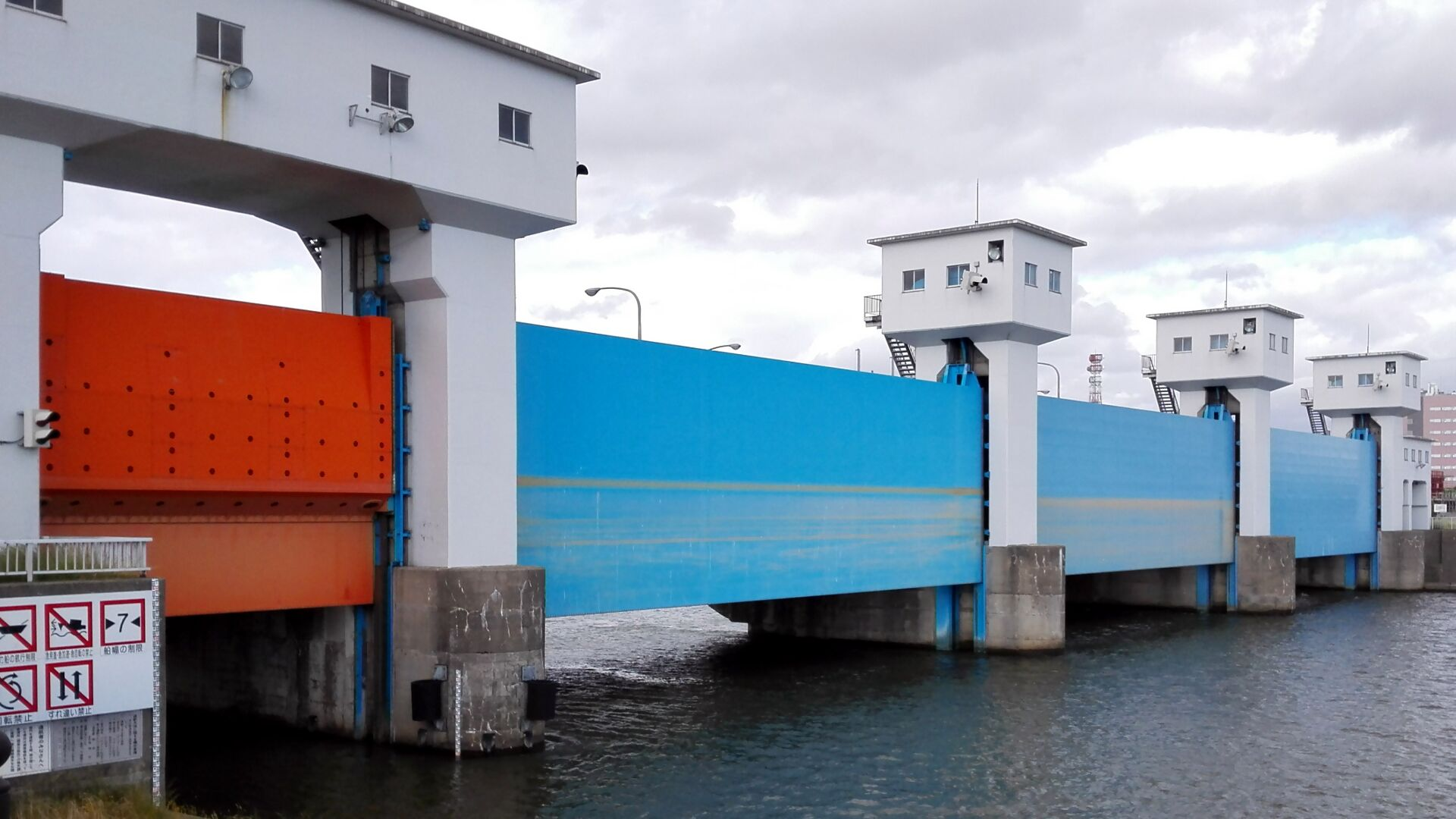
Shinano River gate

Construction of the Sekiya Diversion Channel commenced in 1968 and concluded in 1973 with a channel 1.8 kilometres (1.1 mi) long and 240–280 metres (790–920 ft) wide. The channel provides another alternate path for sediment to be directed straight out to sea and away from the Niigata port. The channel is crossed by the Echigo Line and the National Route 402 (excavated materials from the channel were used in the construction of Route 402).

=== Major dams ===
There are a number of major dams in the Shinano River system, but not on the main river itself, rather its tributaries are extensively dammed and used for electricity generation as well as water for irrigation. The major dams in the system are listed below:

- The Takase Dam, on the Takase River, a tributary of the Sai River, holds 76.2×10^{6} cubic metres (2.69×10^{9} cu ft) and is the tallest of its size in Japan. It is also the second tallest dam in Japan, after the Kurobe Dam.
- The Nanakura Dam, which is part of the Takase Dam system, holds 32.5×10^{6} cubic metres (1.15×10^{9} cu ft).
- The Ōmachi Dam is further downstream from the Nanakura Dam and holds 33.9×10^{6} cubic metres (1.20×10^{9} cu ft).
- The Nagawado Dam is on the Azusa River, another tributary of the Sai, holds 123×10^{6} cubic metres (4.3×10^{9} cu ft) and is followed downstream by a number of smaller dams including the Midono Dam and Inekoki Dam.
- The Sagurigawa Dam sits on the Sankuni River which is a tributary of the Uono River. It holds 27.5×10^{6} cubic metres (9.7×10^{8} cu ft) and is used for a range of purposes including storage for power generation, flood control and water for irrigation.

== Watershed ==
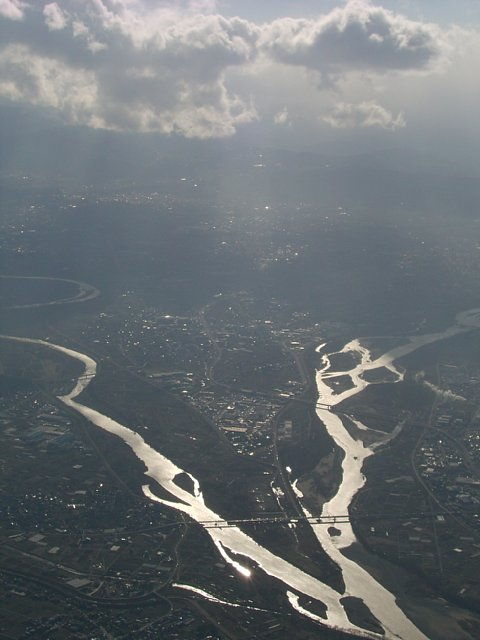
Looking southwest, with the Sai River on the right and the Chikuma on the left (36.625°N 138.25°E)

The 11,900 square kilometres (4,600 sq mi) basin of the Shinano-Chikuma River system is the third largest in Japan and at 367 kilometres (228 mi), is the longest river in the country. The river system supports a population of around 3 million (as of 2009) and supports significant agriculture and electricity generation. The river has 880 branches which is the second highest in Japan after the Yodo River. The Ministry of Land, Infrastructure, Transport and Tourism has designated the Shinano River system as Class A.

The discharge of the river averages 503 cubic metres (17,800 cu ft), with a mean maximum of 3,776 cubic metres (133,300 cu ft) to mean minimum of 91 cubic metres (3,200 cu ft). In addition to this discharge, 30.4 cubic metres (1,070 cu ft) of water is used for municipal and industrial supply across the basin.

The Chikuma River originates in the Japanese Alps at altitudes of above 2,000 metres (6,600 ft) and has a basin in its own right of 7,163 square kilometres (2,766 sq mi). The Chikuma continues generally north-northeast joining with the Sai and changing name to the Shinano, after 214 kilometres (133 mi). The Chikuma, therefore, includes around sixty percent of the whole river system's basin and around 58 percent of the river's length.

In the upper reaches of the river, where it is known as the Chikuma, only around ten percent of the land is flat, agricultural land and around 49,600 hectares (123,000 acres) of it is irrigated. By the time the river flows onto the Echigo Plain, however, much more land is devoted to agriculture and there is huge potential for irrigation, especially due to influence of the Ohkouz Channel and weir. The abundance of water and fertile soils has led to this area being one of the best rice producing areas in Japan.

Rainfall varies considerably in the Shinano basin. In the middle part of the Chikuma River, near its confluence with the Sai River, rainfall is some of the lowest in Japan, generally staying below 1,000 millimetres (39 in). The low precipitation is primarily due to its encirclement by the three ranges which make up the Japanese Alps and by the Jōshin'etsu-kōgen National Park. However, the upper reaches of the Chikuma and Sai Rivers and the lower part of the Chikuma River (where it changes name to the Shinano River) receive 1,200–2,300 millimetres (47–91 in) annually. In the central areas of the Shinano River, especially in the Uono Basin, precipitation increases to around 2,200–3,000 millimetres (87–118 in); this area receives some of the highest winter snow falls in Japan with 40–50% of this precipitation falling as snow. The heavy snow melt is responsible for much of flooding to affect the Echigo, but also allows for the hydroelectricity generation and regular irrigation.

== Ecology ==
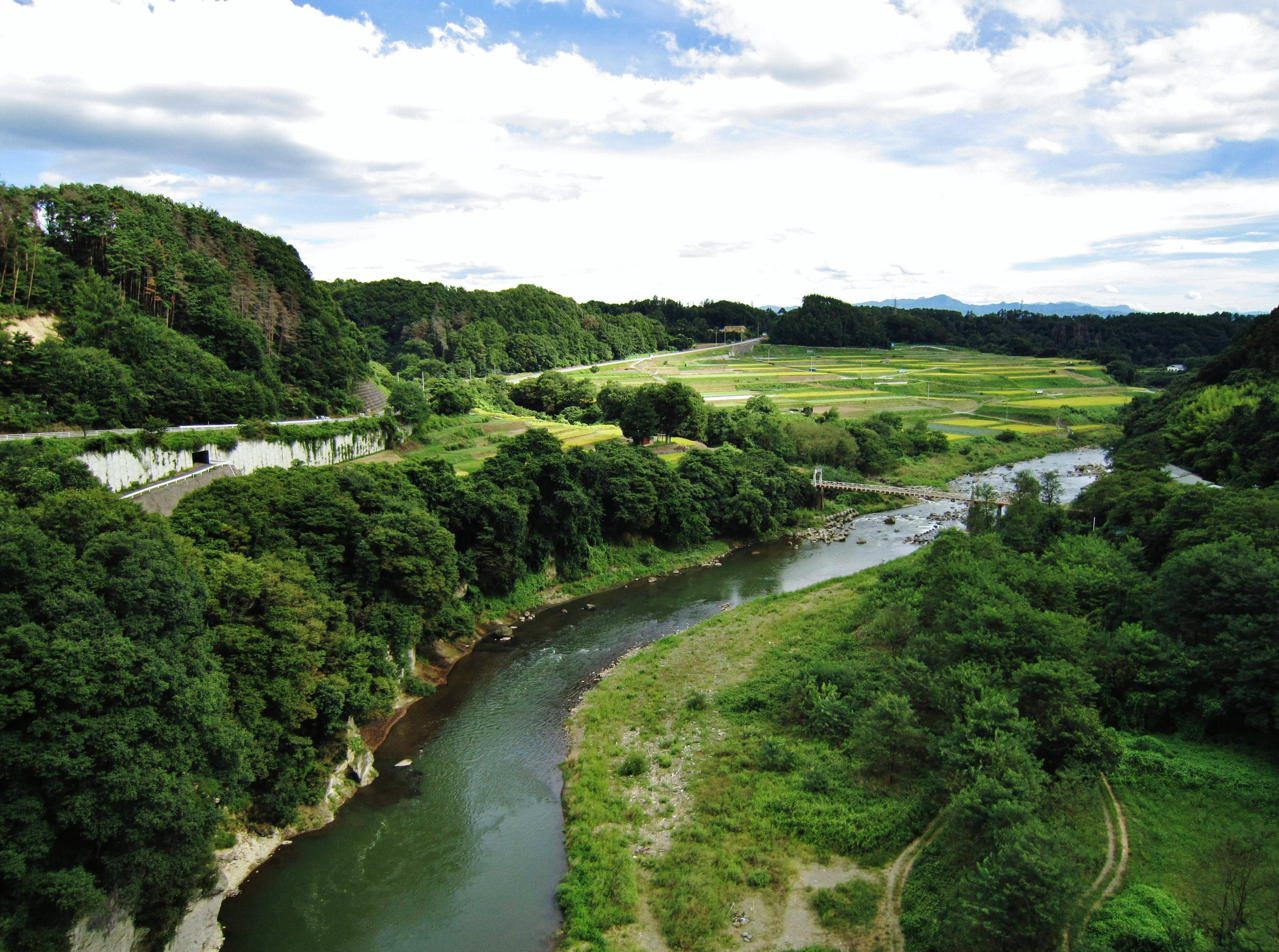
Chikuma River near Komoro

The Shinano basin supports a large range of plant life, including over 1,100 species of plant which grow on the river bank, in the river bed or more broadly. The basin also supports a large range of animal life both in and around the river. However, the development of the river has threatened the continuing existence of a number of different species. Across the country, thirty to fifty (or higher) percent of endangered species are from freshwater river systems and the impact on the Shinano river system is also clear. Primarily this affects fish and amphibians due to their reliance on the river. The construction of weirs and dams to support agriculture and industry as well as the introduction of invasive species and pollution have been the main causes of ecosystem degradation. The Shinano basin provides a habitat for around twenty-five percent of Japan's fish species (around fifty-five of the 200 fish species living in Japan) including both endemic freshwater fish as well as diadromous fish.

The construction of large dams, especially in the mid and upper reaches of the system have significantly affected the ability of fish to migrate up and down the river, and into the Sea of Japan. There has also been a significant increase in the amount of fishing which takes place in the system which is associated with the introduction of invasive fish species and waterbirds into the system. The development of the river, and human settlement, has also resulted in the environmental degradation of key fish habitat. Changes in the system have affected its ability to support and maintain fish species which are endemic to the river. Some actions have been taken to overcome these issues, including prohibitions on fishing salmon during breeding and stocking certain areas for fishing, especially in areas where Tsukeba fish shacks (popup stores along the riverbank) are regularly set up.

The river system has also long been home to bird life. The negative effects of human development have not as significantly affected birds as fish due to the more limited changes to bird habitat (which includes the forests which still remain on surrounding mountains). There are more than 130 species of birds which frequent the river system, these include starlings and ducks as well as migratory birds such as cranes and ibis.

== Economy ==
=== Electricity production ===
The Shinano River system, particularly in its upper reaches (Chikuma River) and in the Sai basin, is used for hydroelectric power generation due to the steep gradient in its upper reaches and its high discharge producing, as a whole, 2,618 megawatts. While the construction of hydroelectric power stations began before World War II, it significantly increased following the war. These power plants, such as the Shimofanato Power Station and the 450,000 kilowatt JR East Shinano River Hydropower Station near Ojiya, supply Tokyo.

There are several hydroelectric power plants operated by Tokyo Electric Power Company in the river system. The Shin-Takasegawa Pumped Storage Station is a significant power plant located on the Takase River near Ōmachi, it boasts the second tallest dam (and the tallest rock-filled embankment) in Japan, and an output of 1280 megawatts.

Additionally, Japan's oldest hydroelectric power plant is located in the Shinano River system. The Miyashiro Power Plant No. 1 was opened by the Azumi Electric Power Company in 1904 and has, since then, been in continual operation, currently operated by Chubu Electric Power Company.

=== Tourism ===
Tourism is a major industry in the Shinano River basin as there are a number of attractions in the area. The Shinano River system attracts a number of tourists from across the country for angling and to experience Tsukeba fish shacks which are set up along the river bank and bed to cook fish as they are caught.

The hot springs along the Chikuma River for example from tourists into the upper reaches of the river. The high rate of snow in the mountains surrounding both the Chikuma and Shinano Rivers make them attractive places for snow sports with a number of ski resorts scattered throughout the mountains. The 1998 Winter Olympics, which were held in Nagano, indicate the large number of locations for snow sports in the area.

In addition to these natural attractions, human involvement in the area is also responsible for making tourism a large part of the regional economy. Every year, around 6.5–7 million people visit the Zenkō-ji Buddhist template in Nagano. It is believed that visiting the template will grant salvation. This has resulted in the head temple of the Tendai sect being a significant attraction for tourists throughout its 1,400-year history.

== See also ==
- Shinano Province
- Shinano, Nagano
- List of rivers of Japan
