= 桜沢駅 =

桜沢駅 is the name of multiple train stations in Japan:

- Sakurasawa Station
- Sakurazawa Station
