= Nagano Expressway =

Expressway in Japan

Nagano Expressway
- 長野自動車道

Route information
- Maintained by East Nippon Expressway Company and Central Nippon Expressway Company
- Length: 75.8 km (47.1 mi)
- Existed: 1986–present

Major junctions
- From: Okaya Junction in Okaya, Nagano; Chūō Expressway
- To: Kōshoku Junction in Chikuma, Nagano; Jōshin-etsu Expressway

Location
- Country: Japan
- Major cities: Shiojiri, Matsumoto, Azumino

Highway system
- National highways of Japan; Expressways of Japan

The Nagano Expressway (長野自動車道, Nagano Jidōsha-dō) is a 4-laned national expressway in Nagano Prefecture, Japan. It is owned and operated by East Nippon Expressway Company and Central Nippon Expressway Company.

== Naming ==
The expressway is officially referred to as the Chūō Expressway Nagano Route. The Chūō Expressway Nagano Route is the official designation for the Chūō Expressway between Takaido Interchange and Okaya Junction (concurrent with the Chūō Expressway Nishinomiya Route), the Nagano Expressway between Okaya Junction and Kōshoku Junction, and the Jōshin-etsu Expressway between Kōshoku Junction and Suzaka-Naganohigashi Interchange (concurrent with the Kan-Etsu Expressway Jōetsu Route).

== Overview ==
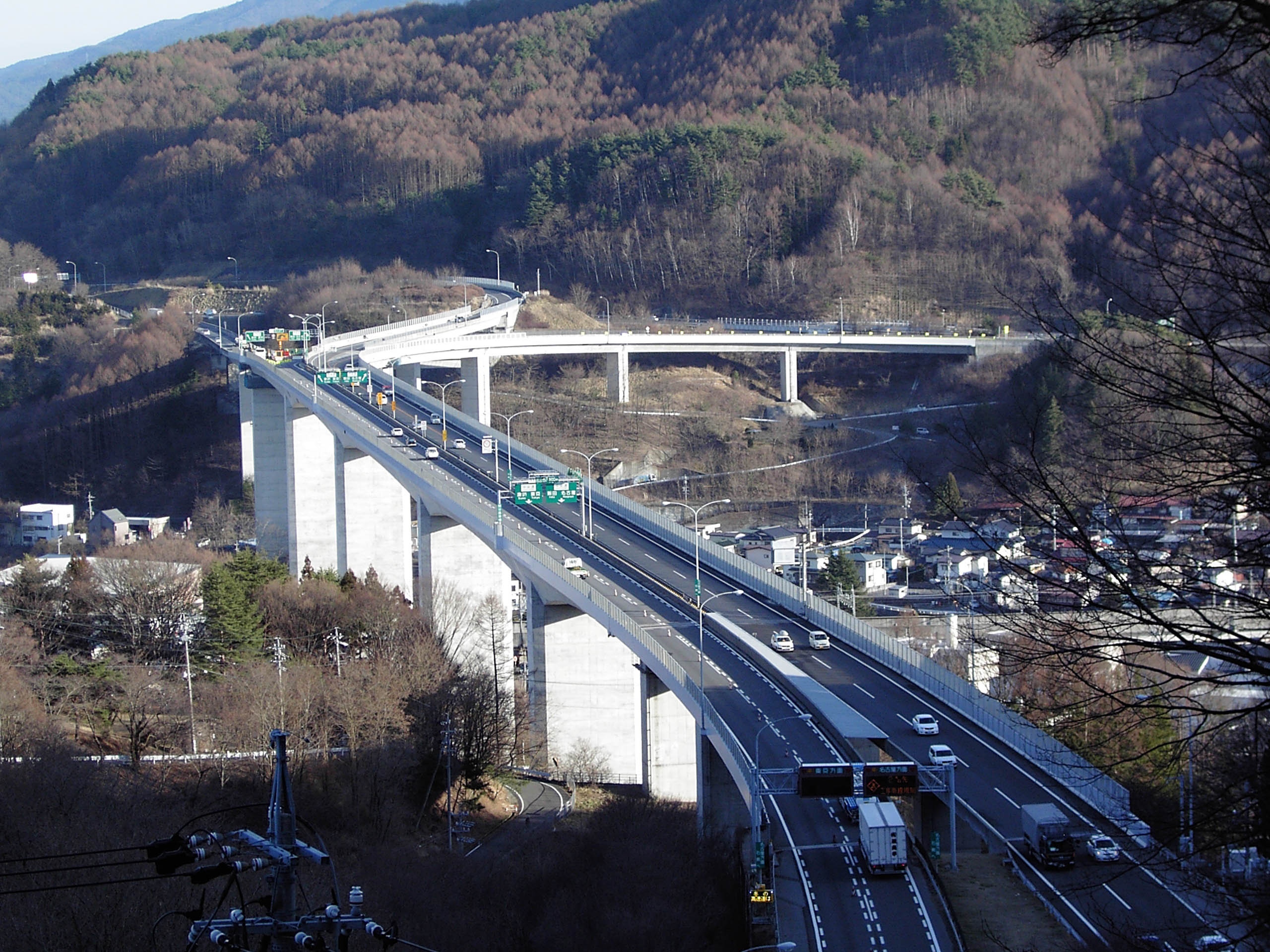
Nagano Expressway

The expressway was originally built and managed by Japan Highway Public Corporation. On October 1, 2005, the management of the route was assigned to East Nippon Expressway Company (Kōshoku Junction to Azumino Interchange, excluding the interchange) and Central Nippon Expressway Company (Okaya Junction to Azumino Interchange, including the interchange).

The route of the expressway runs through the central part of Nagano Prefecture. From the origin at a junction with the Chūō Expressway in the city of Okaya near Lake Suwa, the expressway follows a northerly course to Matsumoto, the major city in the central Nagano area. From here the expressway follows a winding northeasterly course through mountainous areas before reaching the terminus in the city of Chikuma. Beyond the terminus, the roadway continues as the Jōshin-etsu Expressway towards the city of Nagano, the prefectural capital.

== History ==
- March 25, 1986 - Okaya Junction - Okaya Interchange section is opened as part of the Chūō Expressway.
- March 5, 1988 - Okaya Interchange - Matsumoto Interchange section is opened, Okaya Junction - Okaya Interchange section is incorporated as part of the Nagano Expressway.
- August 3, 1988 - Matsumoto Interchange - Toyoshina Interchange section is opened.
- March 25, 1993 - Toyoshina Interchange - Kōshoku Junction section is opened, connects with Jōshin-etsu Expressway.
- October 1, 2006 - Obasute Smart Interchange is opened at Obasute Service Area.

== List of interchanges and features ==
- IC - interchange, SIC - smart interchange, JCT - junction, SA - service area, PA - parking area, BS - bus stop, CB - snow chains, TN - tunnel, BR - bridge

| No. | Name | Connections | Dist. from Origin | Dist. from Terminus | Bus Stop | Notes | Speed Limit | Location (all in Nagano) |
|---|---|---|---|---|---|---|---|---|
| (21) | Okaya JCT | Chūō Expressway | 0.0 | 75.8 | | | 70 km/h | Okaya |
| BR | Okaya Overpass | | ↓ | ↑ | | Length - 1,488m | 70 km/h | Okaya |
| TN | Okaya Tunnel | | ↓ | ↑ | | North-bound 1,450 m South-bound 1,386 m | 70 km/h | Okaya |
| 1 | Okaya IC/ Okaya (Imai) BS | National Route 20 (Shimosuwa Okaya Bypass) | 3.7 | 72.1 | ○ | | 70 km/h | Okaya |
| TN | Enrei Tunnel | | ↓ | ↑ | | North-bound 1,800 m South-bound 1,707 m | 70 km/h | Okaya |
| TN | Enrei Tunnel | | ↓ | ↑ | | North-bound 1,800 m South-bound 1,707 m | 70 km/h | Shiojiri |
| PA | Midoriko PA | | 8.4 | 67.4 | ○ | | 70 km/h | Shiojiri |
| 2 | Shiojiri IC | National Route 20 (Shiojiri Bypass) | 10.9 | 64.9 | | | 70 km/h | Shiojiri |
| 2 | Shiojiri IC | National Route 20 (Shiojiri Bypass) | 10.9 | 64.9 | | | 100 km/h | Shiojiri |
| BS | Hirooka-Nomura BS | | 14.1 | 61.7 | ○ | | 100 km/h | Shiojiri |
| 3 | Shiojiri-kita IC | Pref. Route 27 (Matsumoto Airport Shiojiri-kita Inter Route) | 17.6 | 58.2 | | | 100 km/h | Shiojiri |
| BR | Naraigawa Bridge | | ↓ | ↑ | | | 100 km/h | Matsumoto |
| BS | Kanbayashi BS | | 21.0 | 54.8 | ○ | | 100 km/h | Matsumoto |
| <3-1> | Matsumoto JCT | Chūbu-Jūkan Expressway | ↓ | ↑ | | Planned | 100 km/h | Matsumoto |
| 4 | Matsumoto IC | National Route 158 | 25.8 | 50.0 | ○ | | 100 km/h | Matsumoto |
| SA | Azusagawa SA/SIC | Pref. Route 48 (Matsumoto Kanjō Takaya Route) | 29.1 | (46.7) | | Kōshoku-bound only | 100 km/h | Matsumoto |
| BR | Azusagawa Bridge | | ↓ | ↑ | | Length - 390m | 100 km/h | Matsumoto |
| BR | Azusagawa Bridge | | ↓ | ↑ | | Length - 390m | 100 km/h | Azumino |
| SA | Azusagawa SA/SIC | | (29.9) | 45.9 | | Okaya-bound only | 100 km/h | Azumino |
| 5 | Azumino IC | Pref. Route 57 (Azumino Inter Horigane Route); Pref. Route 310 (Hakuyachō Tazawa Teishajō Route) | 33.1 | 42.7 | ○ | | 100 km/h | Azumino |
| 5 | Azumino IC | Pref. Route 57 (Azumino Inter Horigane Route); Pref. Route 310 (Hakuyachō Tazawa Teishajō Route) | 33.1 | 42.7 | ○ | | 80 km/h | Azumino |
| BR | Saigawa Bridge | | ↓ | ↑ | | Length - 650m | 80 km/h | Azumino |
| BS | Akashina BS | | 36.5 | 39.3 | ○ | | 80 km/h | Azumino |
| TN | Akashina Tunnel | | ↓ | ↑ | | North-bound 2,512 m South-bound 2,536 m | 80 km/h | Azumino |
| BS | Shiga BS | | 40.5 | 35.3 | ○ | Emergency vehicle entrance/exit | 80 km/h | Matsumoto |
| TN | Tachitoge Tunnel | | ↓ | ↑ | | North-bound 3,629 m South-bound 3,598 m | 80 km/h | Matsumoto |
| TN | Tachitoge Tunnel | | ↓ | ↑ | | North-bound 3,629 m South-bound 3,598 m | 80 km/h | Chikuhoku |
| BS | Honjō BS | | 47.3 | 28.5 | ○ | Emergency vehicle entrance/exit | 80 km/h | Chikuhoku |
| BS | Sakakita BS | | 51.5 | 24.3 | ○ | | 80 km/h | Chikuhoku |
| PA | Chikuhoku PA/SIC | | 52.8 | 23.0 | | SIC planned | 80 km/h | Chikuhoku |
| PA | Chikuhoku PA/SIC | | 52.8 | 23.0 | | SIC planned | 80 km/h | Omi |
| 6 | Omi IC | National Route 403 | 56.3 | 19.5 | ○ | | 80 km/h | Omi |
| TN | Ipponmatsu Tunnel | | ↓ | ↑ | | North-bound 3,191 m South-bound 3,203 m | 80 km/h | Omi |
| TN | Ipponmatsu Tunnel | | ↓ | ↑ | | North-bound 3,191 m South-bound 3,203 m | 80 km/h | Chikuma |
| SA | Obasute SA/ SIC | | 63.6 | 12.2 | ○ | | 80 km/h | Chikuma |
| BR | Chikumagawa Bridge | | ↓ | ↑ | | Length - 530m | 80 km/h | Nagano |
| BR | Chikumagawa Bridge | | ↓ | ↑ | | Length - 530m | 80 km/h | Chikuma |
| 7 | Kōshoku IC | National Route 18 (Ueda Shinonoi Bypass) | 74.9 | 0.9 | ○ | | 80 km/h | Chikuma |
| (12) | Kōshoku JCT | Jōshin-etsu Expressway (To Fujioka and Tōkyō) | 75.8 | 0.0 | | | 80 km/h | Chikuma |
Through to Jōshin-etsu Expressway (To Nagano and Jōetsu)

There is one snow chain changing area between Obasute Service Area and Kōshoku Interchange.
