= Jōshin-etsu Expressway =

National expressway in Japan

Jōshin-etsu Expressway
- 上信越自動車道

Route information
- Length: 204.9 km (127.3 mi)
- Existed: 1980–present

Major junctions
- From: Kan-etsu Expressway Fujioka Junction in Fujioka, Gunma (36.2732°N 139.0902°E)
- To: Hokuriku Expressway Jōetsu Junction in Jōetsu, Niigata (37.1371°N 138.2139°E)

Location
- Country: Japan
- Major cities: Tomioka, Annaka, Saku, Komoro, Ueda, Chikuma, Nagano, Nakano, Myōkō

Highway system
- National highways of Japan; Expressways of Japan

The Jōshin-etsu Expressway (上信越自動車道, Jōshin'etsu Jidōshadō) is a national expressway in Japan. It is owned and operated by East Nippon Expressway Company.

== Naming ==
Jōshin-etsu (上信越; Japanese pronunciation: [dʑoː.ɕiꜜɰ̃.e.tsɯ]) is a kanji acronym consisting of 3 characters, each representing the former names of the prefectures that the route traverses. Kōzuke Province (上野国) consists of present-day Gunma Prefecture, Shinano Province (信濃国) consists of present-day Nagano Prefecture, and Echigo Province (越後国) consists of present-day Niigata Prefecture.

Officially, the expressway is referred to as the Kan-Etsu Expressway Jōetsu Route. This designation consists of the entire Jōshin-etsu Expressway as well as the Kan-Etsu Expressway beyond Fujioka Junction to Nerima Interchange (concurrent with the Kan-Etsu Expressway Niigata Route).

== Route description ==
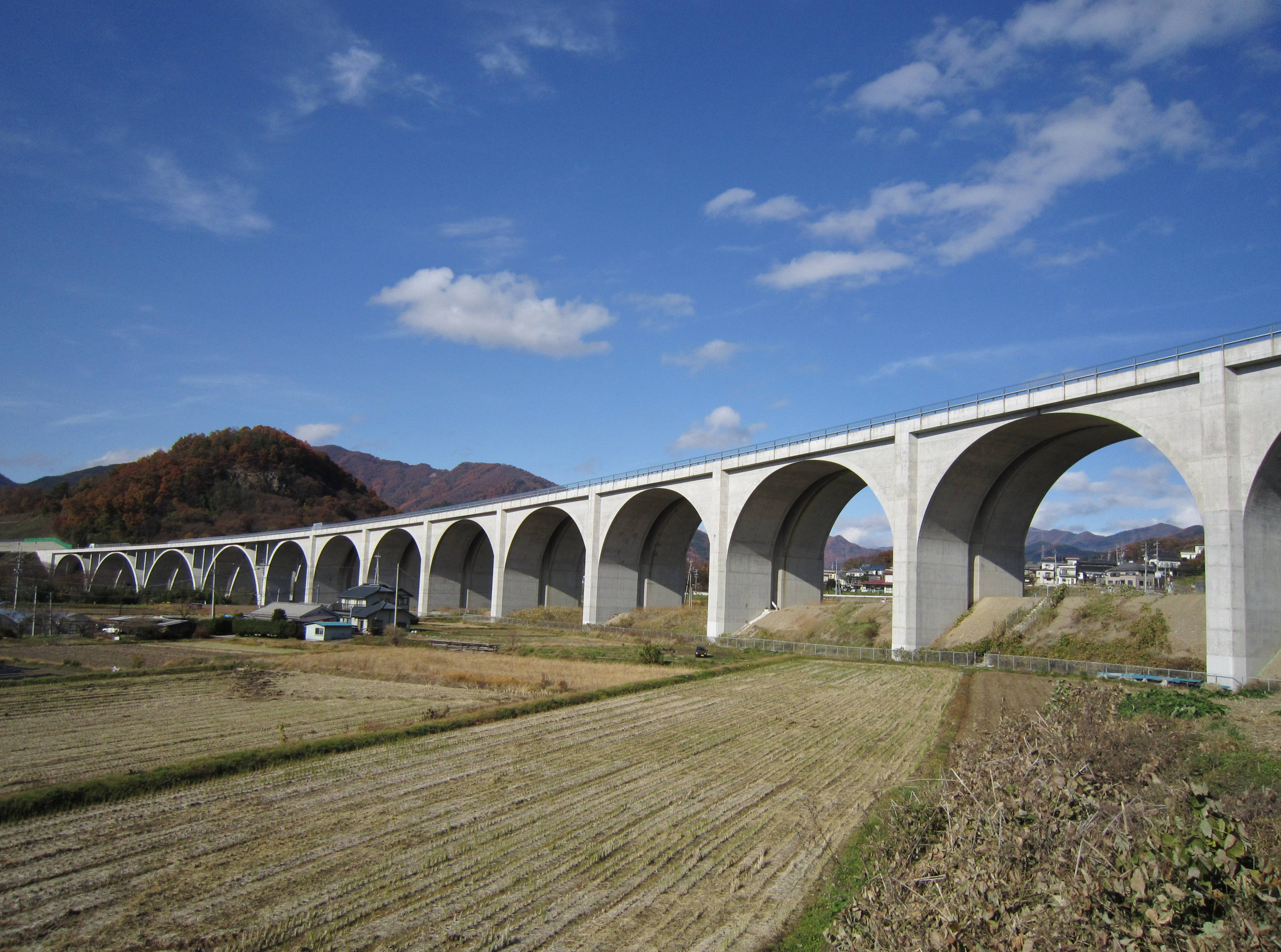
Expressway in Ueda, Nagano

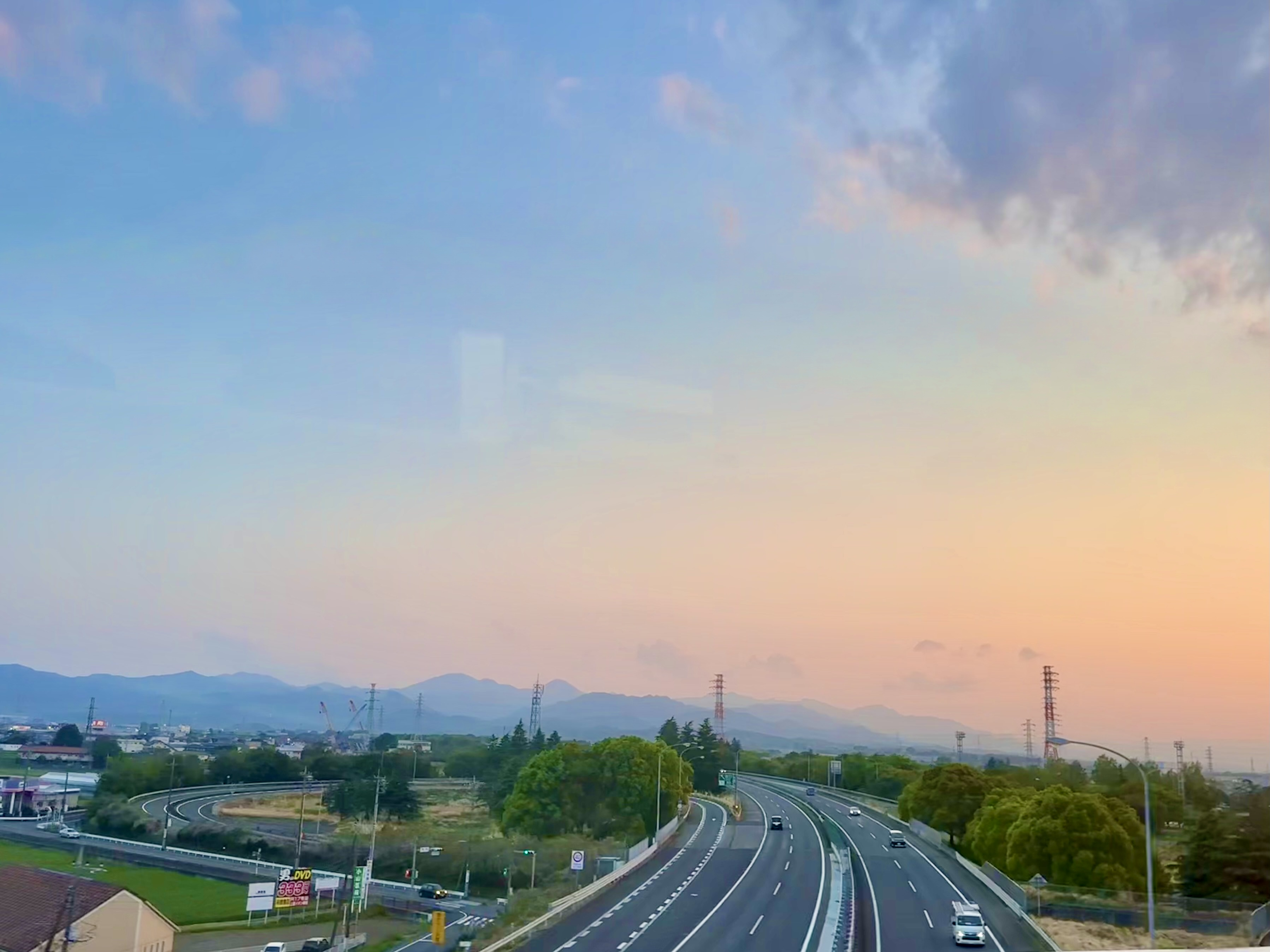
Jōshin-etsu Expressway Fujioka interchange at sunset

The expressway begins at a junction with the Kan-Etsu Expressway in southern Gunma Prefecture and heads west, paralleling National Route 254 until Shimonita. From here the route branches north, passing Mount Myōgi, then heads west once more from Annaka. The route parallels National Route 18 from this point until the terminus. The expressway then follows a winding route through the mountainous area separating Gunma and Nagano Prefectures. From Saku, Nagano the route follows a northwesterly course, passing Mount Asama, until it reaches a junction with the Nagano Expressway near the city of Nagano. The route then heads north, following the east bank of the Chikuma River, before heading into the mountainous region separating Nagano and Niigata Prefectures. The expressway continues north through Niigata Prefecture, passing Mount Myōkō, and eventually terminating at a junction with the Hokuriku Expressway in Jōetsu near the Japan Sea coastline.

The expressway is 6 lanes from Fujioka Junction to Fujioka Interchange. The remaining section from Fujioka Interchange to Jōetsu Junction is 4 lanes, from 5 December 2019 according to E-NEXCO.

== History ==
The first section was completed in 1980 and the entire route was completed in 1999. On the night of 16 December 2020, about 300 vehicles were trapped on the expressway after a truck blocked it off due to it becoming stuck in the snow. In response, the company that manages the route supplied drivers who were stuck on the road until the next morning.

== List of interchanges and features ==
- IC - interchange, SIC - smart interchange, JCT - junction, SA - service area, PA - parking area, BS - bus stop, CB - snow chains, TN - tunnel, BR - bridge

No.	Name	Connections	Dist. from Origin	Dist. from Terminus	Bus Stop	Notes	Speed Limit	Location	
(9)	Fujioka JCT	Kan-etsu Expressway	0.0	204.9			80 km/h	Fujioka	Gunma
1/PA	Fujioka IC/PA	Pref. Route 13 (Maebashi Nagatoro Route)	1.8	203.1		Parking Area/Highway Oasis only accessible to Fujioka JCT-bound traffic	80 km/h	Fujioka	Gunma
1/PA	Fujioka IC/PA	Pref. Route 13 (Maebashi Nagatoro Route)	1.8	203.1		Parking Area/Highway Oasis only accessible to Fujioka JCT-bound traffic	100 km/h	Fujioka	Gunma
2	Yoshii IC	Pref. Route 41 (Kanda Yoshii Teishajō Route)	11.2	193.7			100 km/h	Takasaki	Gunma
PA	Kanra PA		15.4	189.5			100 km/h	Kanra	Gunma
3	Tomioka IC		20.1	184.8	○		100 km/h	Tomioka	Gunma
4	Shimonita IC	National Route 254	26.8	178.1	○		100 km/h	Shimonita	Gunma
5	Matsuida-Myōgi IC; Matsuida BS	Pref. Route 51 (Matsuida Shimonita Route)	37.5	167.4	○		100 km/h	Annaka	Gunma
5	Matsuida-Myōgi IC; Matsuida BS	Pref. Route 51 (Matsuida Shimonita Route)	37.5	167.4	○		80 km/h	Annaka	Gunma
SA	Yokokawa SA		42.1	162.8			80 km/h	Annaka	Gunma
BR	Usui Bridge		↓	↑			80 km/h	Annaka	Gunma
TN	Takaiwayama Tunnel		↓	↑		Fujioka-bound 1,019m Jōetsu-bound 1,070m	80 km/h	Annaka	Gunma
6	Usui-Karuizawa IC	Pref. Route 92 (Matsuida Karuizawa Route)	52.5	152.4	○		80 km/h	Annaka	Gunma
CB	Usui Chain Base		↓	↑			80 km/h	Annaka	Gunma
TN	Ōyama Tunnel		↓	↑		Fujioka-bound 1,722m Jōetsu-bound 1,625m	80 km/h	Annaka	Gunma
TN	Ōyama Tunnel		↓	↑		Fujioka-bound 1,722m Jōetsu-bound 1,625m	80 km/h	Shimonita	Gunma
TN	Nikkureyama Tunnel		↓	↑		Fujioka-bound 2,314m Jōetsu-bound 2,051m	80 km/h	Shimonita	Gunma
TN	Takatachi Tunnel		↓	↑		Fujioka-bound 373m	80 km/h	Shimonita	Gunma
TN	Happūzan Tunnel		↓	↑		Fujioka-bound 3,998m Jōetsu-bound 4,471m	80 km/h	Shimonita	Gunma
TN	Happūzan Tunnel		↓	↑		Fujioka-bound 3,998m Jōetsu-bound 4,471m	80 km/h	Saku	Nagano
CB	Kōsaka Chain Base		↓	↑			80 km/h	Saku	Nagano
TN	Akarusan Tunnel		↓	↑		Fujioka-bound 1,703m Jōetsu-bound 1,960m	80 km/h	Saku	Nagano
6-1/PA	Sakudaira PA/ SIC		68.4	136.5		Highway Oasis	80 km/h	Saku	Nagano
7	Saku IC	Pref. Route 9 (Saku Karuizawa Route)	71.3	133.6	○		80 km/h	Saku	Nagano
7-1	Saku-Komoro JCT	Chūbu-Ōdan Expressway	72.8	132.1			80 km/h	Komoro	Nagano
BS	Komoro-Kōgen BS		78.0	126.9	○		80 km/h	Komoro	Nagano
8	Komoro IC	Pref. Route 79 (Komoro Ueda Route)	82.1	122.8			80 km/h	Komoro	Nagano
9/SA	Tōbu-Yunomaru IC/SA	Pref. Route 81 (Maruko Tōbu Inter Route)	88.6	116.3	○		80 km/h	Tōmi	Nagano
10	Ueda-Sugadaira IC	National Route 144	96.9	108.0	○		80 km/h	Ueda	Nagano
TN	Tarōyama Tunnel		↓	↑		Fujioka-bound 4,264m Jōetsu-bound 4,303m	80 km/h	Ueda	Nagano
TN	Tarōyama Tunnel		↓	↑		Fujioka-bound 4,264m Jōetsu-bound 4,303m	80 km/h	Sakaki	Nagano
11	Sakaki IC	Pref. Route 91 (Sakaki Inter Route)	104.8	100.1			80 km/h	Sakaki	Nagano
PA	Chikumagawa-Sakaki PA		106.2	98.7	○		80 km/h	Sakaki	Nagano
TN	Gorigamine Tunnel		↓	↑		Fujioka-bound 4,518m Jōetsu-bound 4,474m	80 km/h	Sakaki	Nagano
TN	Gorigamine Tunnel		↓	↑		Fujioka-bound 4,518m Jōetsu-bound 4,474m	80 km/h	Chikuma	Nagano
TN	Mori Tunnel		↓	↑		Fujioka-bound 1,421m Jōetsu-bound 1,450m	80 km/h	Chikuma	Nagano
BS	Yashiro BS		117.1	87.8	○		80 km/h	Chikuma	Nagano
12	Kōshoku JCT	Nagano Expressway	119.1	85.8			80 km/h	Chikuma	Nagano
12	Kōshoku JCT	Nagano Expressway	119.1	85.8			100 km/h	Chikuma	Nagano
TN	Yakushiyama Tunnel		↓	↑		Fujioka-bound 1,212m Jōetsu-bound 1,181m	100 km/h	Chikuma	Nagano
TN	Yakushiyama Tunnel		↓	↑		Fujioka-bound 1,212m Jōetsu-bound 1,181m	100 km/h	Nagano	Nagano
PA	Matsushiro PA		123.2	81.7			100 km/h	Nagano	Nagano
13	Nagano IC	Pref. Route 35 (Nagano Sanada Route)	125.1	79.8	○		100 km/h	Nagano	Nagano
BS	Wakaho BS		130.2	74.7	○		100 km/h	Nagano	Nagano
14	Suzaka-Naganohigashi IC	National Route 403	135.0	69.9			100 km/h	Nagano	Nagano
14	Suzaka-Naganohigashi IC	National Route 403	135.0	69.9			100 km/h	Suzaka	Nagano
BS	Suzaka BS		137.5	67.4	○		100 km/h	Suzaka	Nagano
14-1/PA	Obuse PA/ SIC	Pref. Route 343 (Murayama Obuse Teishajō Route)	141.6	63.3		Highway Oasis	100 km/h	Obuse	Nagano
BS	Obuse BS		143.2	61.7	○		100 km/h	Obuse	Nagano
15	Shinshū-Nakano IC	Pref. Route 29 (Nakano Toyono Route)	146.5	58.4			100 km/h	Nakano	Nagano
15	Shinshū-Nakano IC	Pref. Route 29 (Nakano Toyono Route)	146.5	58.4			80 km/h	Nakano	Nagano
BS	Nakano BS		147.2	57.7	○		80 km/h	Nakano	Nagano
BR	Kita-Chikumagawa Bridge		↓	↑		Length - 370m Chikuma River crossing	80 km/h	Nakano	Nagano
CB	Kaesa Chain Base		↓	↑			80 km/h	Nakano	Nagano
16	Toyota-Iiyama IC	National Route 117	154.2	50.7			80 km/h	Nakano	Nagano
16	Toyota-Iiyama IC	National Route 117	154.2	50.7			70 km/h	Nakano	Nagano
BS	Toyota BS		155.0	49.9	○		70 km/h	Nakano	Nagano
TN	Nagae Tunnel		↓	↑			70 km/h	Nakano	Nagano
TN	Samizu Tunnel		↓	↑		Fujioka-bound 1,415m Jōetsu-bound 1,441m	70 km/h	Iizuna	Nagano
TN	Yakushidake Tunnel		↓	↑		Fujioka-bound 2,320m Jōetsu-bound 2,362m	70 km/h	Iizuna	Nagano
TN	Yakushidake Tunnel		↓	↑		Fujioka-bound 2,320m Jōetsu-bound 2,362m	70 km/h	Shinano	Nagano
PA	Kurohime-Nojiriko PA		164.3	40.6			70 km/h	Shinano	Nagano
BS	Kashiwabara BS		166.2	38.7	○		70 km/h	Shinano	Nagano
17	Shinanomachi IC	National Route 18 (Nojiri Bypass)	167.4	37.5			70 km/h	Shinano	Nagano
BR	Reimei Bridge		↓	↑		Length - 370m Seki River crossing	70 km/h	Shinano	Nagano
BR	Reimei Bridge		↓	↑		Length - 370m Seki River crossing	70 km/h	Myōkō	Niigata
18	Myōkōkōgen IC	National Route 18 (Myōkō Nojiri Bypass); Pref. Route 187 (Ikenotaira Myōkōkōgen Route)	172.5	32.4			70 km/h	Myōkō	Niigata
BS	Myōkōkōgen BS		↓	↑	X	Bus Stop closed	70 km/h	Myōkō	Niigata
SA	Myōkō SA		179.9	25.0	X	Bus Stop closed	70 km/h	Myōkō	Niigata
19	Nakagō IC	National Route 18 (Jōshin Bypass)	184.5	20.4			70 km/h	Jōetsu	Niigata
BS	Nakagō-kita BS		↓	↑	X	Bus Stop closed	70 km/h	Jōetsu	Niigata
19-1/PA	Arai PA/ SIC	Pref. Route 428 (Nishinoyashinden Arai Route)	191.9	13.0	X	Highway Oasis; Bus Stop closed	70 km/h	Myōkō	Niigata
TN	Kannondaira Tunnel		↓	↑		Length - 1,502m	70 km/h	Myōkō	Niigata
20	Jōetsu-Takada IC	Pref. Route 85 (Jōetsu-Takada Inter Route)	199.0	5.9			70 km/h	Jōetsu	Niigata
(31-1)	Jōetsu JCT	Hokuriku Expressway	204.9	0.0			70 km/h	Jōetsu	Niigata

There are also 2 snow chain changing areas between Toyota-Iiyama Interchange and Kurohime-Nojiriko Parking Area, and 1 area between Sakaki Interchange and Ueda-Sugadaira Interchange (Fujioka-bound only).
