= Nakano, Nagano =

Nakano 中野市
- City
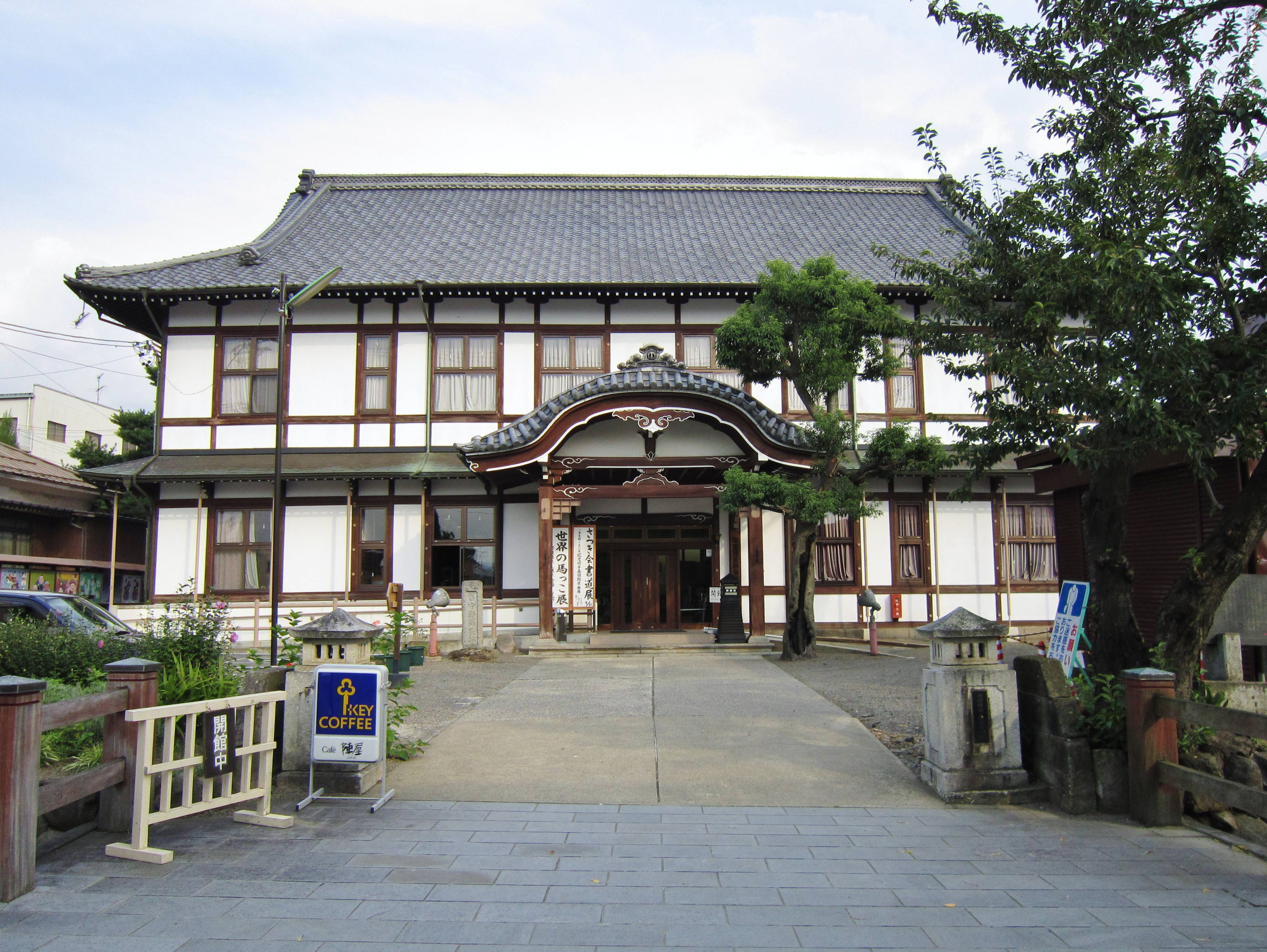
- former Nakano Jin'ya

- Flag Seal

- Location of Nakano in Nagano Prefecture

- Coordinates: 36°44′31.2″N 138°22′9.9″E
- Country: Japan
- Region: Chūbu (Kōshin'etsu)
- Prefecture: Nagano

Area
  - Total: 112.18 km^{2} (43.31 sq mi)

Population (March 2019)
  - Total: 42,664
  - Density: 380.32/km^{2} (985.02/sq mi)
- Time zone: UTC+9 (Japan Standard Time)
- Symbols
  - Tree: Apple
  - Flower: Paeonia lactiflora
- Phone number: 0269-22-2111
- Address: 1-3-19 Miyoshi-cho, Nakano-shi, Nagano-ken 383-8614
- Website: Official website

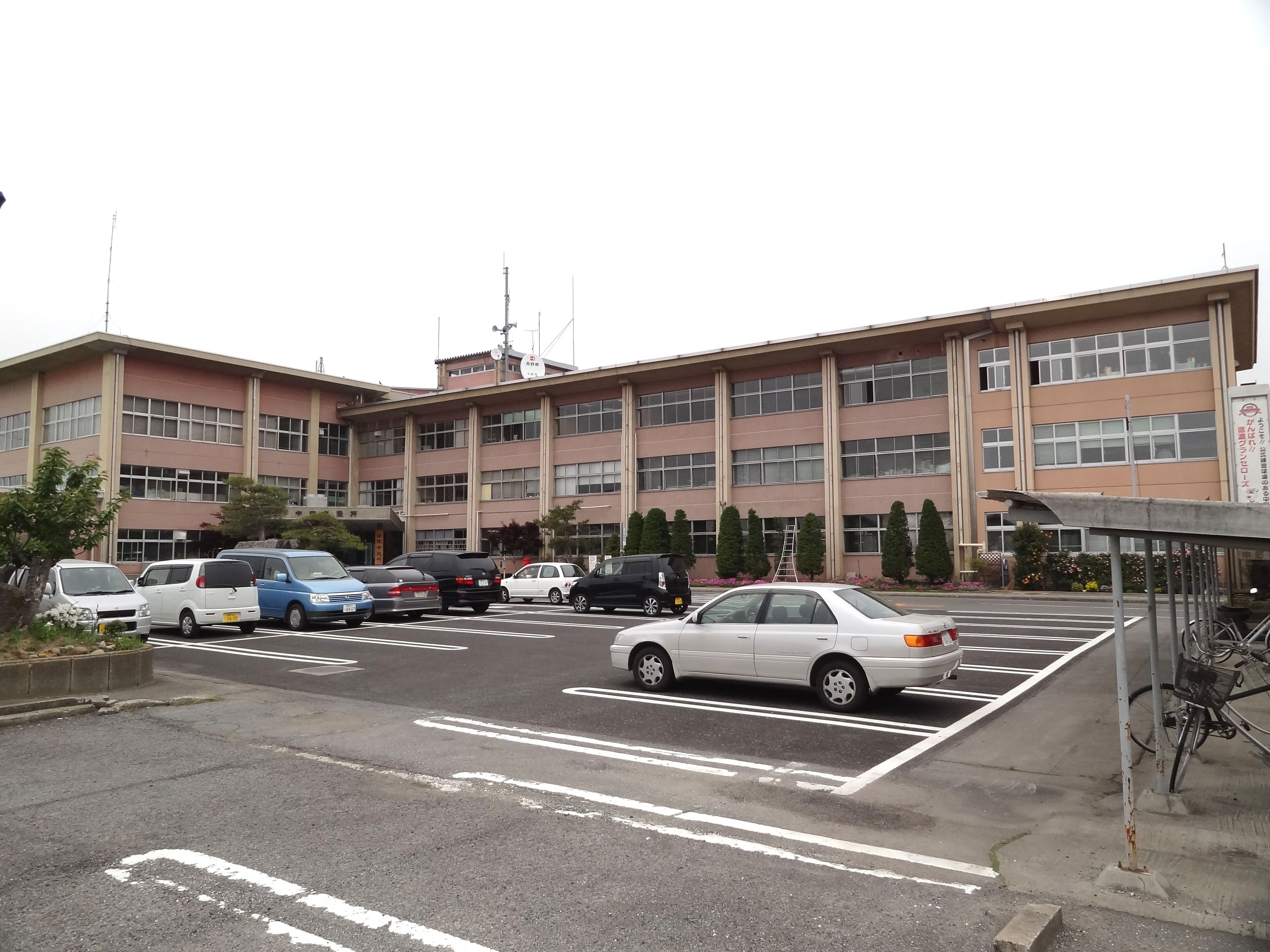
Nakano city hall

Nakano (中野市, Nakano-shi; Japanese pronunciation: [nä̀.kä́.nó̞(.ɕì)]) is a city located in Nagano Prefecture, Japan. As of 1 March 2019, the city had an estimated population of 42,664 in 15649 households, and a population density of 380 persons per km^{2}. The total area of the city is 112.18 square kilometres (43.31 sq mi).

== Geography ==
Located in the northern end of the Zennoji Plain of northern Nagano prefecture, Nakano is located on the Chikuma River and is surrounded by mountains. The weather in Nakano varies greatly over the seasons.

=== Surrounding municipalities ===
- Nagano Prefecture
  - Iiyama
  - Iizuna
  - Kijimadaira
  - Nagano
  - Obuse
  - Takayama
  - Yamanouchi

=== Climate ===
Nakano has a climate characterized by characterized by hot and humid summers, and relatively mild winters (Köppen climate classification Cfa). The average annual temperature in Nakano is 12.2 °C. The average annual rainfall is 1406 mm with September as the wettest month. The temperatures are highest on average in August, at around 25.6 °C, and lowest in January, at around -0.4 °C.

== Demographics ==
Per Japanese census data, the population of Nakano has remained relatively constant over the past 70 years.

Historical population
Year	Pop.	±%
1940	36,123	—
1950	46,821	+29.6%
1960	44,036	−5.9%
1970	43,111	−2.1%
1980	44,895	+4.1%
1990	46,468	+3.5%
2000	47,845	+3.0%
2010	45,643	−4.6%
2020	42,338	−7.2%

== History ==
The area of present-day Nakano was part of ancient Shinano Province. The area was part of the tenryō (direct holdings) of the Tokugawa shogunate during the Edo period and was administered from Nakano jin'ya. Nakano was the capital of "Nakano Prefecture" from 1870 to 1871, when it was merged with Nagano Prefecture. The modern town of Nakano was established on April 1, 1889 with the establishment of the municipalities system. It was elevated to city status on July 1, 1955 by the merger of the town with neighboring villages of Hino, Entoku, Nagaoka, Hiraoka, Takaoka, Shinano, and Yamato.

On April 1, 2005, the village of Toyota (from Shimominochi District) was merged into Nakano.

== Government ==
Nakano has a mayor-council form of government with a directly elected mayor and a unicameral city legislature of 20 members.

== Economy ==
The city of Nakano is supported largely by its agricultural industry. Nakano boasts high quality fruits and vegetables, including Fuji apples, Kyohō grapes, peaches, pears, rice, asparagus, and mushrooms. It is Japan's leading producer of Enokitake mushrooms. The city is also well known for its roses. The biannual rose festival in Ippongi Park displays thousands of rose plants, and attracts tourists from all over Japan. Nakano City has experienced significant growth since the Nagano 1998 Winter Olympics. Located near many popular ski areas, Nakano's economy is augmented by the ski-tourism industry.

Nakano is home to Cosina Co., Ltd, a designer and manufacturer of camera and lenses.

== Education ==
Nakano has 11 public elementary schools and four public middle schools run by the city. There are two public high schools under the Nagano Prefectural Board of Education.

== Transportation ==
=== Railway ===
- East Japan Railway Company - Iiyama Line
  - Kami-Imai - Kaesa
- Nagano Electric Railway – Nagano Line
  - Sakurasawa - Entoku - Shinshū-Nakano - Nakano-Matsukawa - Shinano-Takehara

=== Highway ===
- Jōshin-etsu Expressway
- National Route 117
- National Route 292
- National Route 403

== Local attractions ==
- Takanashi clan fortified residence, a Sengoku-period National Historic Site

=== Sports teams ===
In 2007, Nakano became home to the Shinano Grand Serows, a baseball team in the Japanese BC League (Baseball Challenge League).

== Notable people from Nakano ==
- Joe Hisaishi, composer and musical director
- Reiji Miyajima, manga artist
- Tetsuo Nagata, cinematographer
