= Obuse =

Obuse 小布施町
- Town
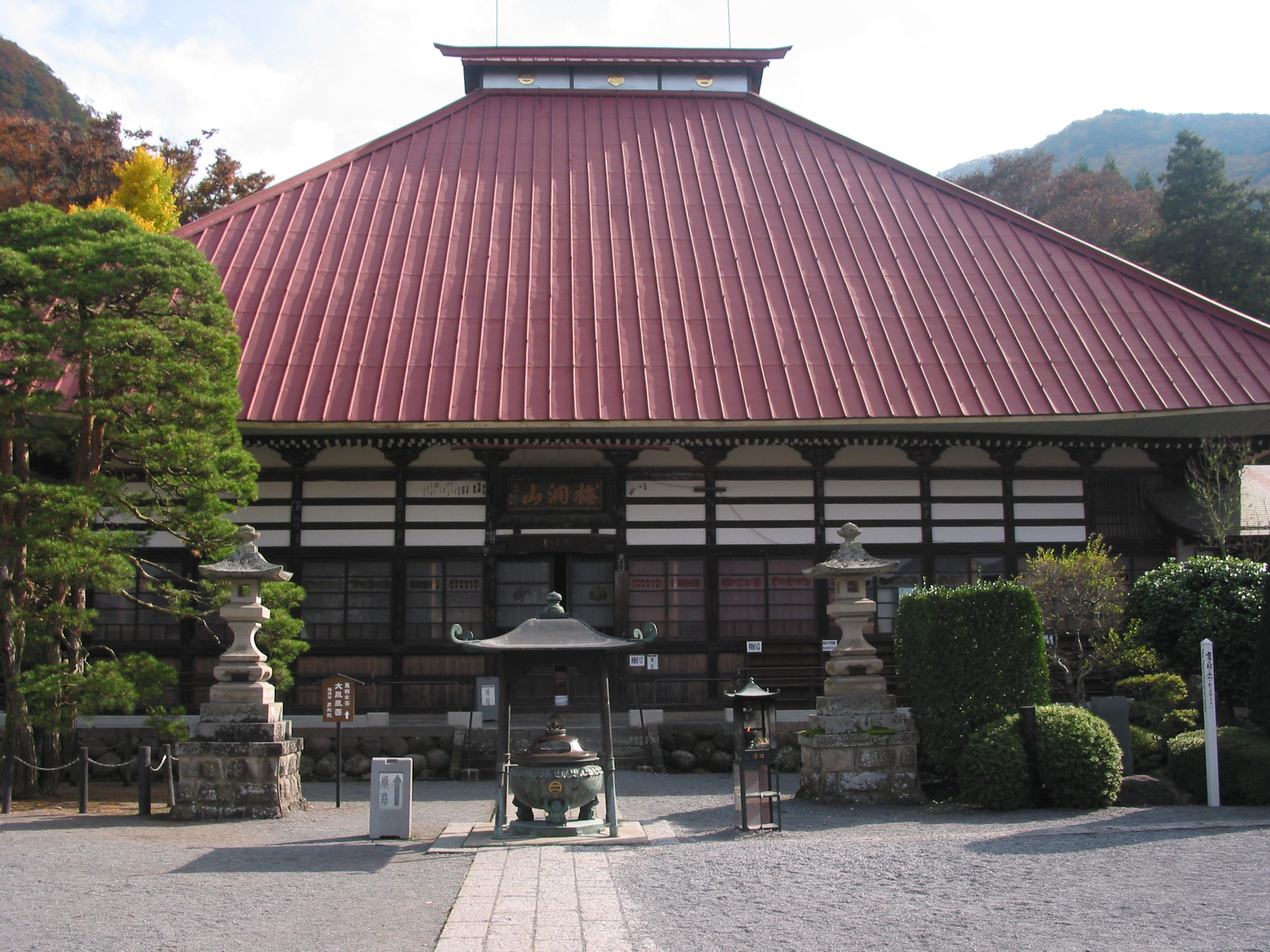
- Gansho-in Buddhist Temple

- Flag Seal

- Location of Obuse in Nagano Prefecture

- Coordinates: 36°41′51″N 138°18′43.6″E
- Country: Japan
- Region: Chūbu (Kōshin'etsu)
- Prefecture: Nagano
- District: Kamitakai

Area
  - Total: 19.12 km^{2} (7.38 sq mi)

Population (April 2019)
  - Total: 10,999
  - Density: 575.3/km^{2} (1,490/sq mi)
- Time zone: UTC+9 (Japan Standard Time)
- Symbols
  - Tree: Castanea crenata
  - Flower: Apple
- Phone number: 026-247-3111
- Address: 1491-2 Obuse, Obuse-machi, Kamitakai-gun, Nagano-ken 381-0297
- Website: Official website

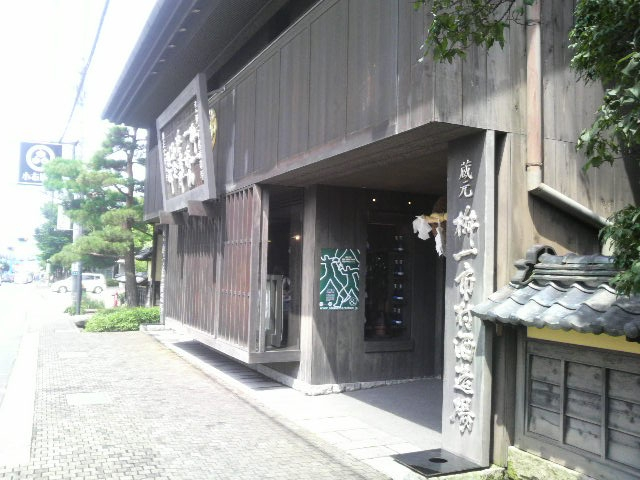
Masuichi Ichimura Sake brewer in Obuse

Obuse (小布施町, Obuse-machi) is a town located in Nagano Prefecture, Japan. As of 1 April 2019, the town had an estimated population of 10,999 in 3832 households, and a population density of 580 persons per km^{2}. The total area of the town is 19.12 square kilometres (7.38 sq mi).

== Geography ==
Obuse is located in northern Nagano Prefecture to the east of Nagano city.

=== Surrounding municipalities ===
- Nagano Prefecture
  - Nagano
  - Nakano
  - Suzaka
  - Takayama

=== Climate ===
The town has a climate characterized by characterized by hot and humid summers, and cold winters (Köppen climate classification Cfa). The average annual temperature in Obuse is 12.4 °C. The average annual rainfall is 1229 mm with September as the wettest month. The temperatures are highest on average in August, at around 25.9 °C, and lowest in January, at around -0.3 °C.

== Demographics ==
Per Japanese census data, the population of Obuse has remained fairly stable over the past 40 years.

Historical population
Year	Pop.	±%
1940	8,301	—
1950	10,817	+30.3%
1960	10,098	−6.6%
1970	9,625	−4.7%
1980	11,205	+16.4%
1990	11,568	+3.2%
2000	11,460	−0.9%
2010	11,074	−3.4%
2020	10,660	−3.7%

== History ==
The area of present-day Obuse was part of ancient Shinano Province, and can be found as a place name in late Heian period records associated with a shōen associated with Emperor Go-Shirakawa. In 1843, at the age of 83, the Japanese painter Hokusai traveled to Obuse at the invitation of a wealthy farmer, Takai Kozan where he stayed for several years. During his time in Obuse, Hokusai created several masterpieces, included the Masculine Wave and the Feminine Wave.

The modern village of Obuse was created with the establishment of the municipalities system on April 1, 1889. It was elevated to town status on February 1, 1954. Obuse annexed the neighboring village of Tsusumi on November 1, 1954.

The largest hospital in Obuse, Shinsei Hospital, (New Life Hospital) was established by J. G. Waller, an Anglican Church of Canada missionary, in 1932 as a tuberculosis sanatorium with funds raised in Canada.

== Education ==
Obuse has one public elementary school and one public middle school. The town does not have a high school.

== Transportation ==
=== Railway ===
- Nagano Electric Railway - Nagano Line
  - Obuse - Tsusumi

=== Highway ===
- Jōshin-etsu Expressway
- National Route 18
- National Route 403

== Local attractions ==
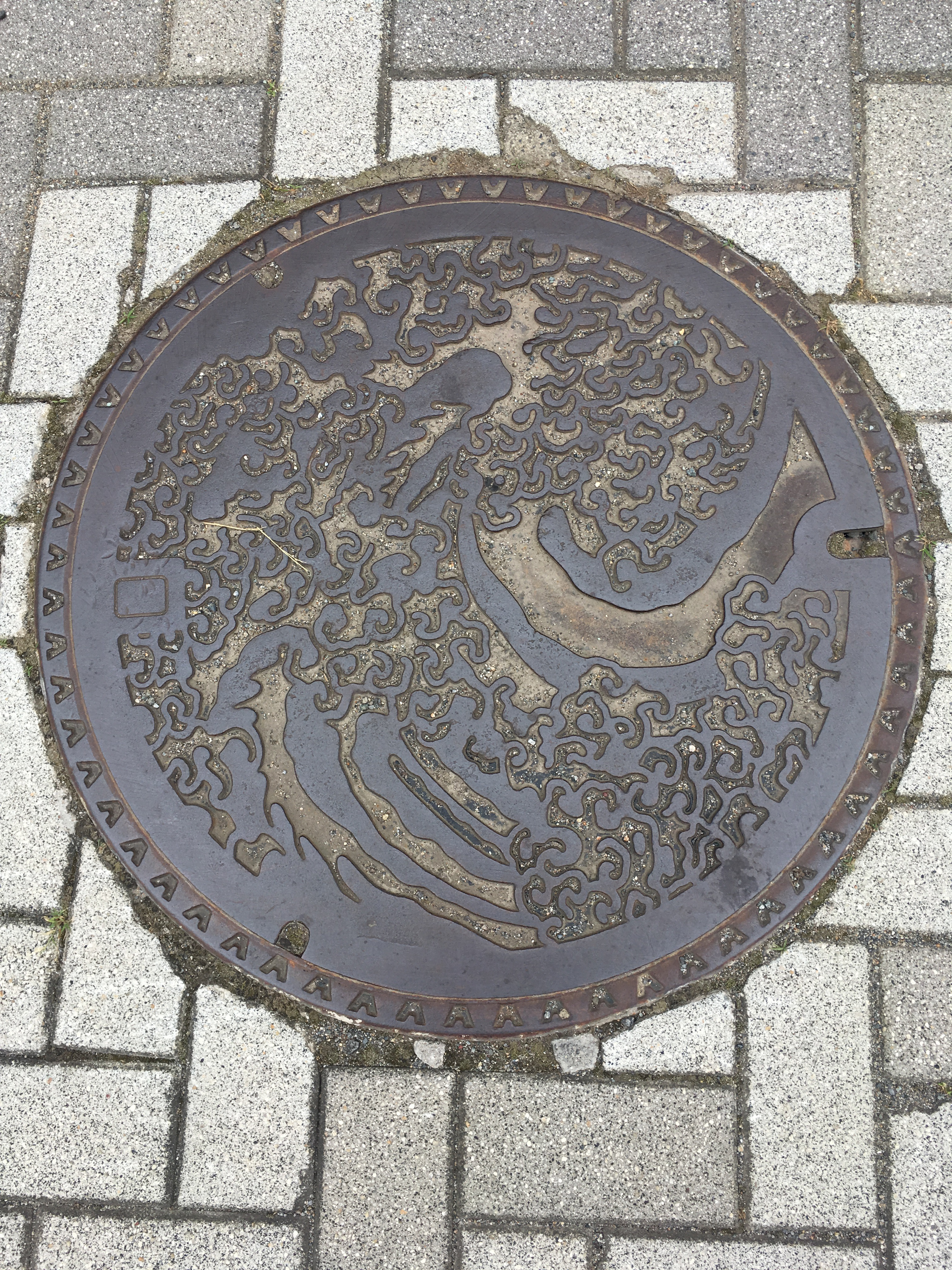
Manhole cover in Obuse with Hokusai's Masculine Wave

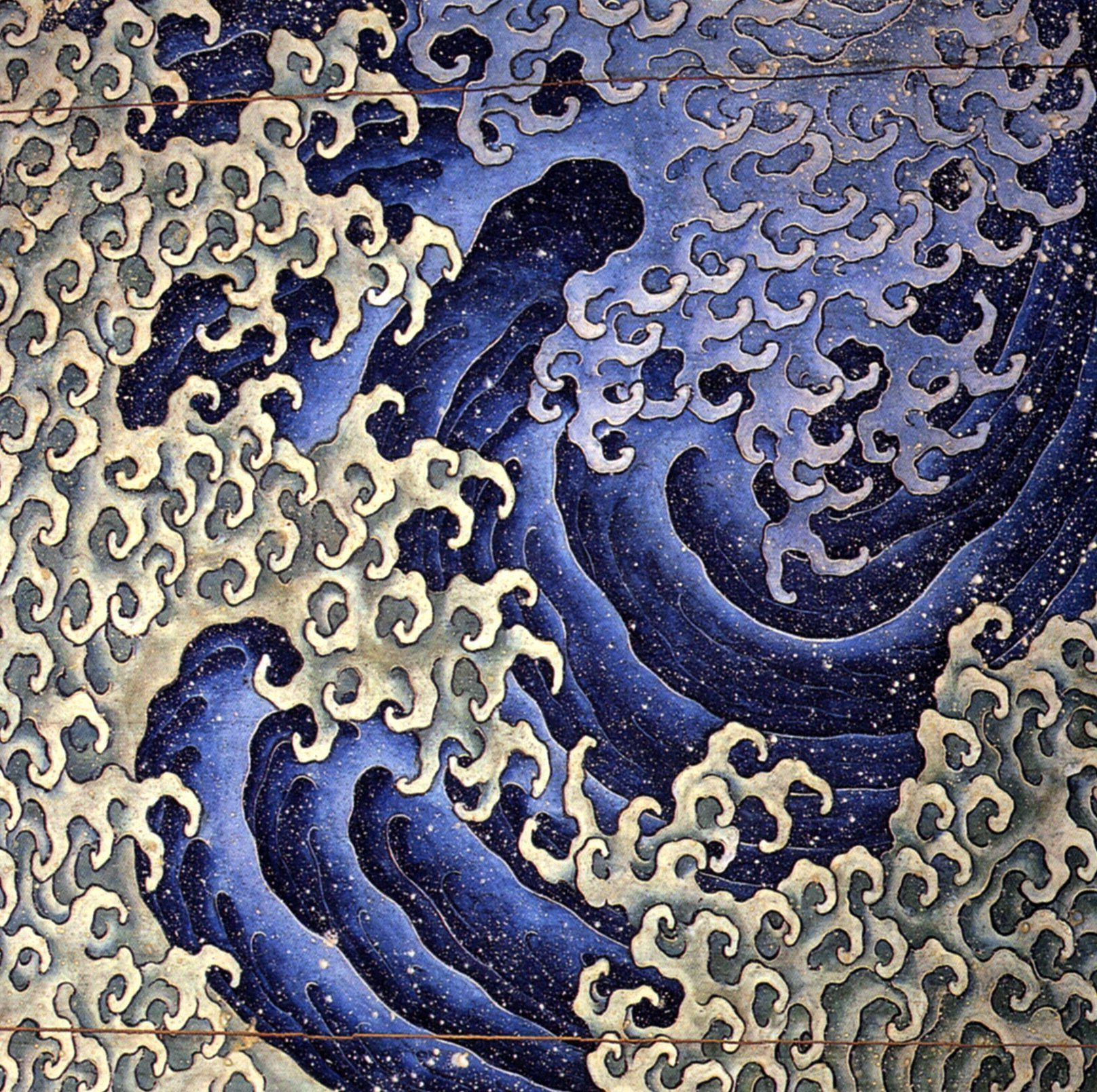
Masculine Wave

Although small, the quaint town of Obuse is known for its chestnut industry, which brings a unique flair to the work of local artisans, inspiring different dishes such as the chestnut ice cream and other desserts. The abundance of chestnuts in the area have made Obuse an attractive stop for tourists and art collectors in the heart of Nagano, creating a market for local woodworkers and artists.

- Gansho-in, Buddhist temple with ceiling painted by Katsushika Hokusai
- Hokusai Museum This museum is a national treasure, exhibiting the works and history of the great Japanese artist Hokusai who created several of his renowned masterpieces in Obuse.
