= Kami-Imai Station =

Railway station in Nakano, Nagano Prefecture, Japan

Kami-Imai Station 上今井駅
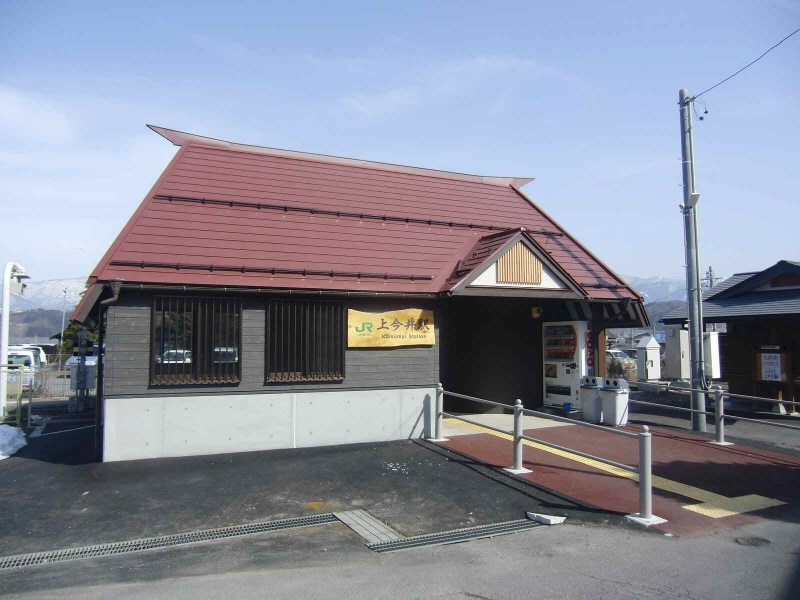
- Kami-Imai Station in March 2015

General information
- Location: Kamiimai, Nakano-shi, Nagano-ken 389-2102; Japan
- Coordinates: 36.7538°N 138.3194°E
- Elevation: 338.9 metres (1,112 ft)
- Operator: JR East
- Line: ■ Iiyama Line
- Distance: 6.9 kilometres (4.3 mi) from Toyono
- Platforms: 1 side platform
- Tracks: 1

Other information
- Status: Unstaffed
- Website: Official website

History
- Opened: 20 October 1921

Services
Preceding station	JR East	Following station
Tategahana towards Nagano	Iiyama Line	Kaesa towards Echigo-Kawaguchi
Location
- Location within Nagano Prefecture Location within Japan

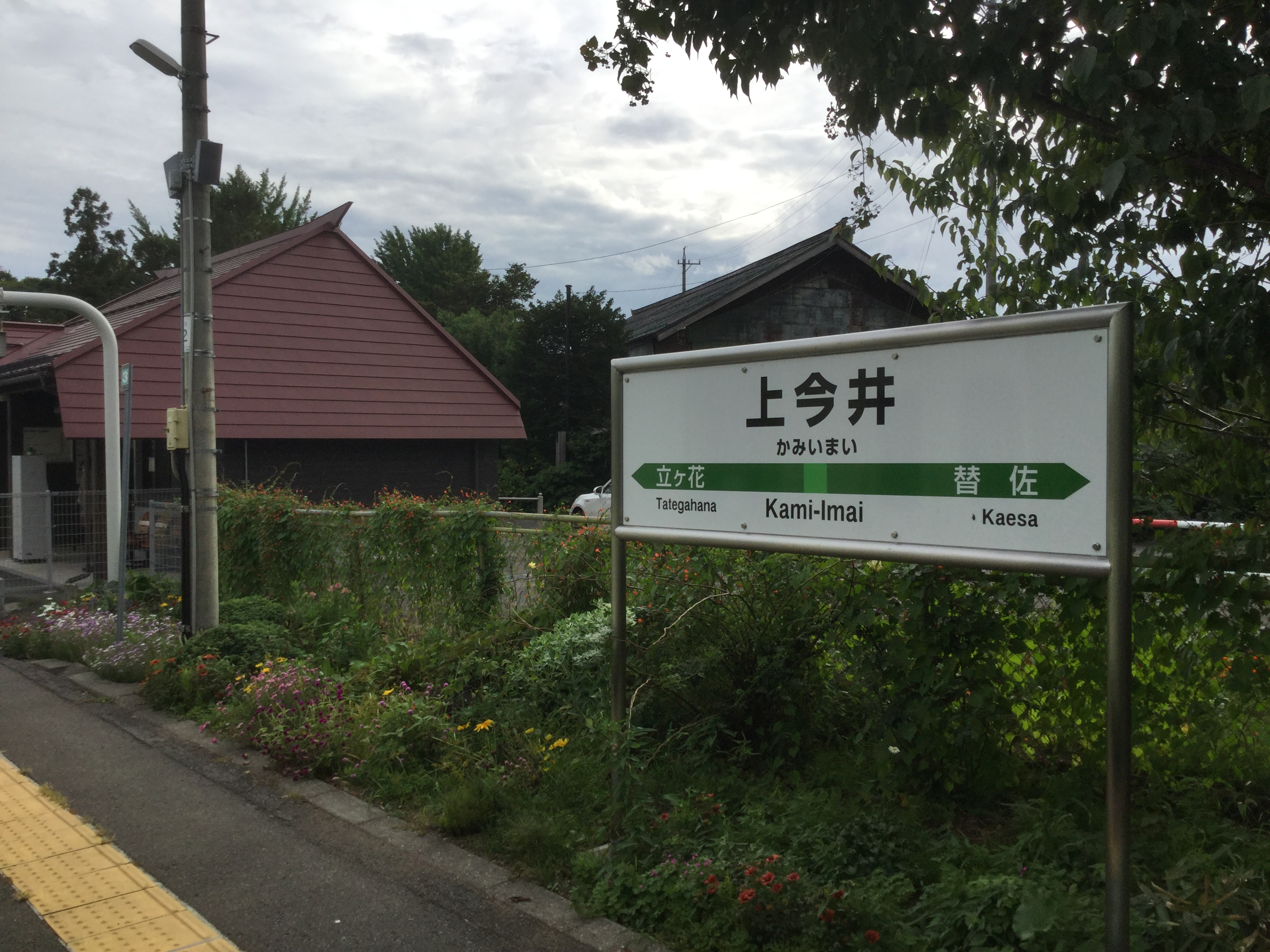
Station platform and sign, 2019

Kami-Imai Station (上今井駅, Kami-Imai-eki) is a railway station in the city of Nakano, Nagano Prefecture, Japan operated by the East Japan Railway Company (JR East).

== Lines ==
Kita-Imai Station is served by the Iiyama Line, and is 6.9 kilometers from the starting point of the line at Toyono Station.

== Station layout ==
The station consists of one side platform serving one bi-directional track. The station is unattended.

== History ==
Kami-Imai Station opened on 20 October 1921. With the privatization of Japanese National Railways (JNR) on 1 April 1987, the station came under the control of JR East.

== Surrounding area ==
- Chikuma River
- National Route 117

== See also ==
- List of railway stations in Japan
