= Gorigamine Tunnel =

Railway tunnel in Nagano Prefecture, Japan

Gorigamine Railway Tunnel
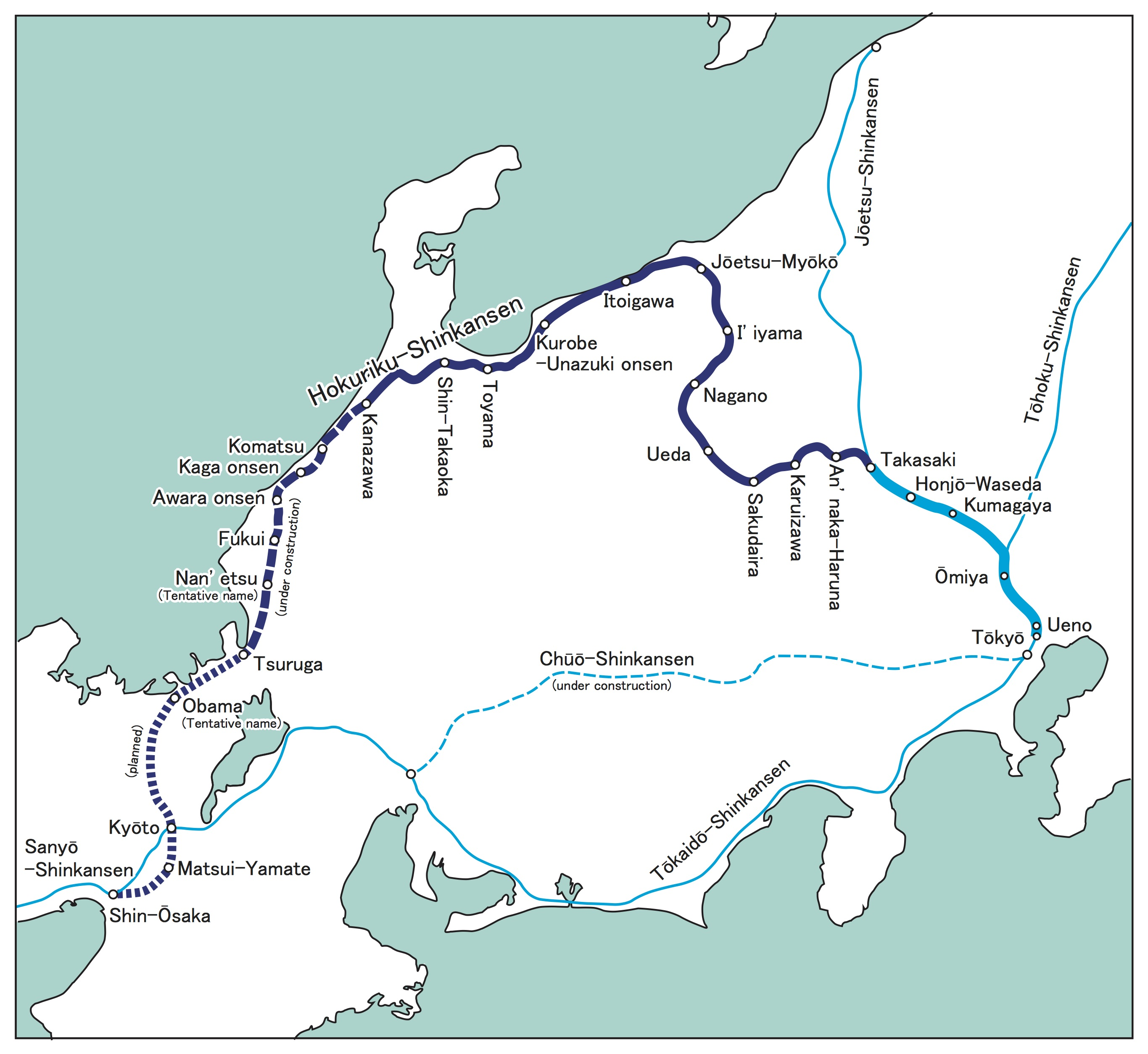
- Hokuriku Shinkansen line
- Interactive map of Gorigamine Railway Tunnel

Overview
- Line: Hokuriku Shinkansen
- Location: between Ueda, Nagano and Shinonoi Station
- Coordinates: 36°30′41.8932″N 138°9′5.7528″E
- Status: active

Operation
- Opened: 1997
- Operator: East Japan Railway Company
- Traffic: Railway
- Character: Passenger and Freight

Technical
- Line length: 15,175 m (49,787 ft)
- No. of tracks: 2

Gorigamine Tunnel (五里ヶ峯トンネル, Gorigamine tonneru) is a tunnel on JR's Hokuriku Shinkansen that runs between Ueda city and Chikuma city in Nagano Prefecture with total length of 15.175 km. It was built and completed in 1997.

== See also ==
- List of tunnels in Japan
- Seikan Tunnel undersea tunnel between Honshu-Hokkaido islands
- Kanmon Railway Tunnel undersea tunnel between Honshu-Kyushu islands
- Sakhalin–Hokkaido Tunnel
- Bohai Strait tunnel
