= Takanashi clan fortified residence =

Takanashi clan residence ruins
- 高梨氏館跡 (Japanese)
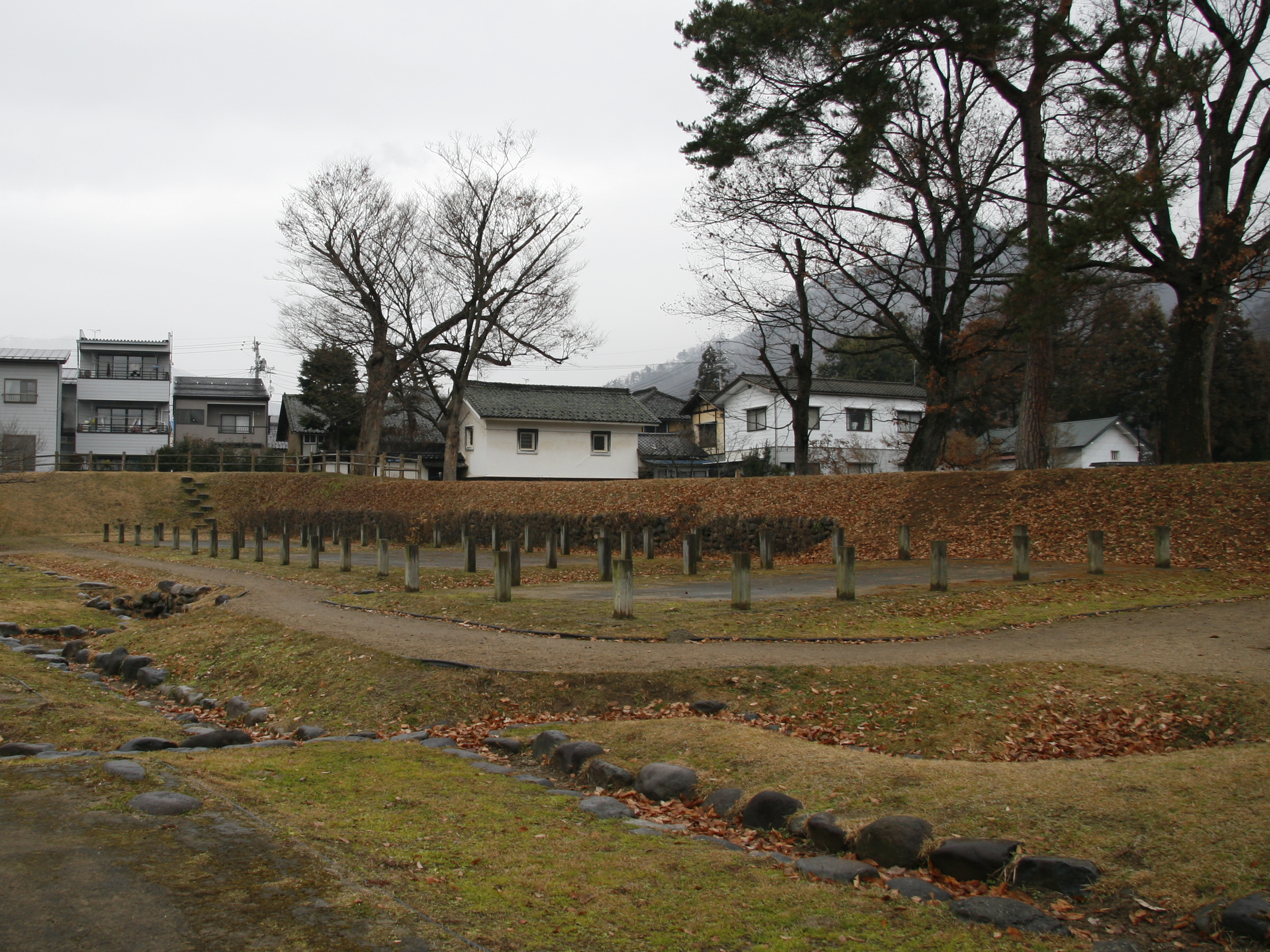
- Takanashi clan residence ruins

- Takanashi clan residence ruins Takanashi clan fortified residence (Japan)
- 36°44′41″N 138°22′36″E
- Type: settlement
- Periods: Kamakura - Sengoku period
- Location: Nakano, Nagano, Japan
- Region: Chūbu region

Site notes
- Public access: Yes

Takanashi clan residence ruins (高梨氏館跡, Takanashi-shi yakata ato) is an archaeological site containing the ruins of the Kamakura to early Sengoku period fortified residence of the Takanashi clan, local warlords in northern Shinano Province during that period. The site is located in the Otate neighborhood of the city of Nakano, Nagano in the Chūbu region of Japan. The ruins were designated a National Historic Site of Japan in 2007.

== Overview ==
The Takanashi clan was a cadet branch of the Minamoto clan which gradually came to dominate northern Shinano Province during the Muromachi period. They were attacked by the Takeda clan from Kai Province and turned to the powerful Uesugi clan of Echigo Province for assistance. The Takanashi were allies of Uesugi Kenshin against Takeda Shingen at the Battle of Kawanakajima. However, with the rise of Oda Nobunaga the Takanashi gradually lost their territory and became vassals of the Uesugi. When Uesugi Kagekatsu was relocated from Echigo Province by Toyotomi Hideyoshi, the Takanashi clan followed him to Aizu and eventually to Yonezawa.

The ruins of their former clan residence in Shinano is located in the northern end of the Nagano basin in the northeastern part of the prefecture, on flat land at an elevation 380 meters. In the mountains about one kilometer east are the ruins of Kamogamine Castle and Kamagamine Castle. The residence ruins occupy a rectangular site measuring roughly 130 meters east-to-west by 100 meters north-to-south, surrounded by a moat and a palisade on all sides. The moat had a width of ten meters and depth of three meters with a V-shaped cross-section and the ramparts were ten meters wide and from one to three meters in height. Within this enclosed area, an archaeological excavation conducted from 1986 to 1994 discovered the foundation pillars for twelve buildings, a well, and Shinto shrine. The remains of a Japanese garden was also discovered, including a pond that was eight meters by six meters with three arrangements of rocks and river stones. It appears to have been changed at some point from a pond to a dry landscape garden. It is the only Sengoku-period garden to have been discovered in Nagano Prefecture.

The site is now a public park and is located approximately ten minutes on foot from Shinshū-Nakano Station on the Nagano Electric Railway.

== See also ==
- List of Historic Sites of Japan (Nagano)
