= Tsusumi Station =

Railway station in Obuse, Nagano Prefecture, Japan

Tsusumi Station 都住駅
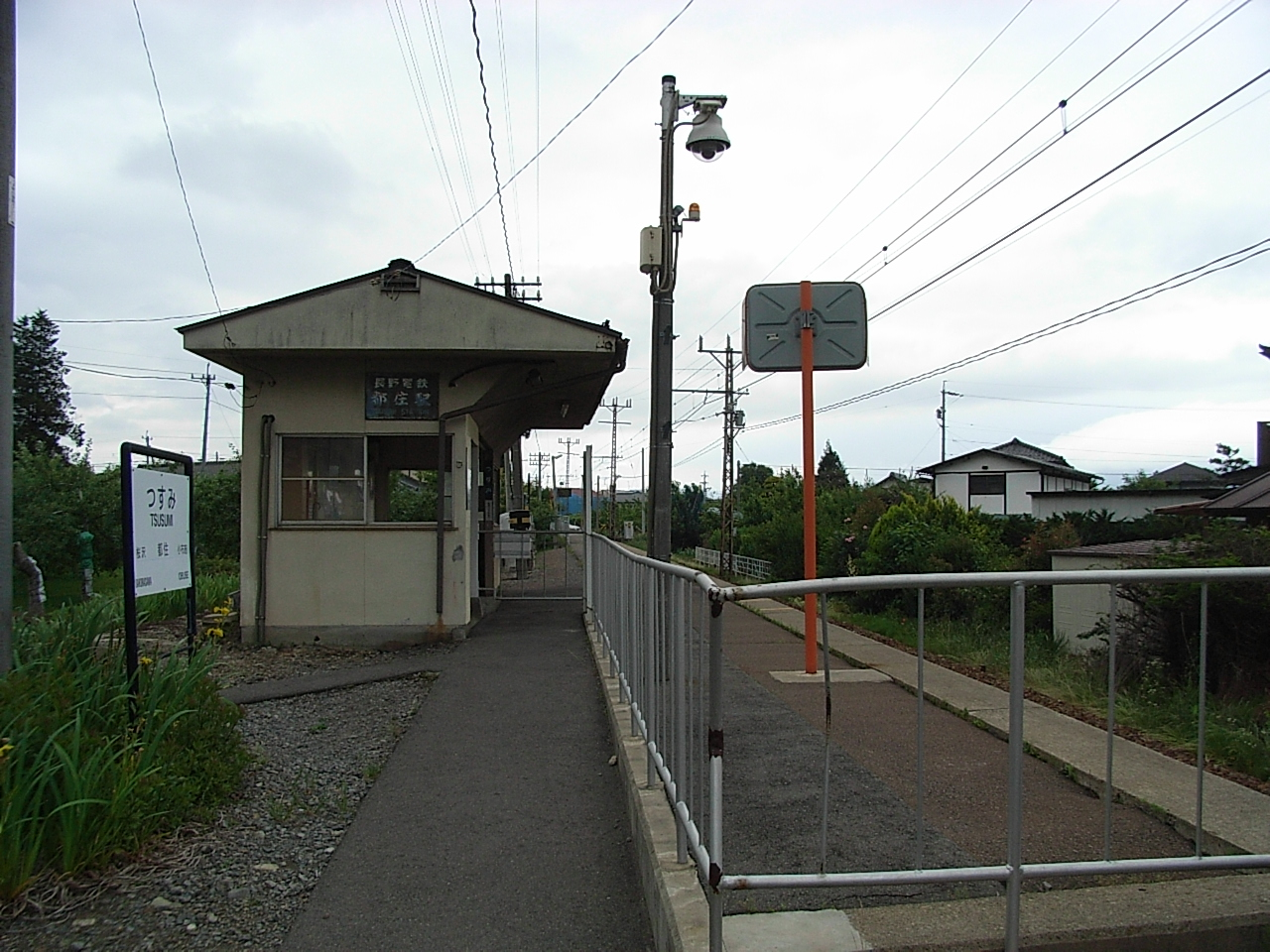
- Tsusumi Station in June 2009

General information
- Location: 472-4 Tsusumi, Obuse-cho, Kamitakai-gun, Nagano-ken 381-0208; Japan
- Coordinates: 36°42′14.5″N 138°19′19.7″E
- Operator: Nagano Electric Railway
- Line: ■ Nagano Electric Railway Nagano Line
- Distance: 18.6 km from Nagano
- Platforms: 1 side platform
- Tracks: 1

Other information
- Status: Unstaffed
- Station code: N16
- Website: Official website

History
- Opened: 11 October 1928

Passengers
- FY2015: 109 daily
Location
- Location within Nagano Prefecture Location within Japan

Tsusumi Station (都住駅, Tsusumi-eki) is a railway station in the town of Obuse, Nagano, Japan, operated by the private railway operating company Nagano Electric Railway.

== Lines ==
Tsusumi Station is a station on the Nagano Electric Railway Nagano Line and is 18.6 kilometers from the terminus of the line at Nagano Station.

== Station layout ==
The station consists of one ground-level side platform serving a single bi-directional track. The station is unattended.

== Adjacent stations ==
«	Service	»
Nagano Electric Railway
Express-A: Does not stop at this station
Express-B: Does not stop at this station
Obuse	Local	Sakurasawa

== History ==
The station opened on 11 October 1928.

== Passenger statistics ==
In fiscal 2015, the station was used by an average of 109 passengers daily (boarding passengers only).

== Surrounding area ==
- National Route 403

== See also ==
- List of railway stations in Japan
