= Sakurasawa Station =

Railway station in Nakano, Nagano Prefecture, Japan

Sakurasawa Station 桜沢駅
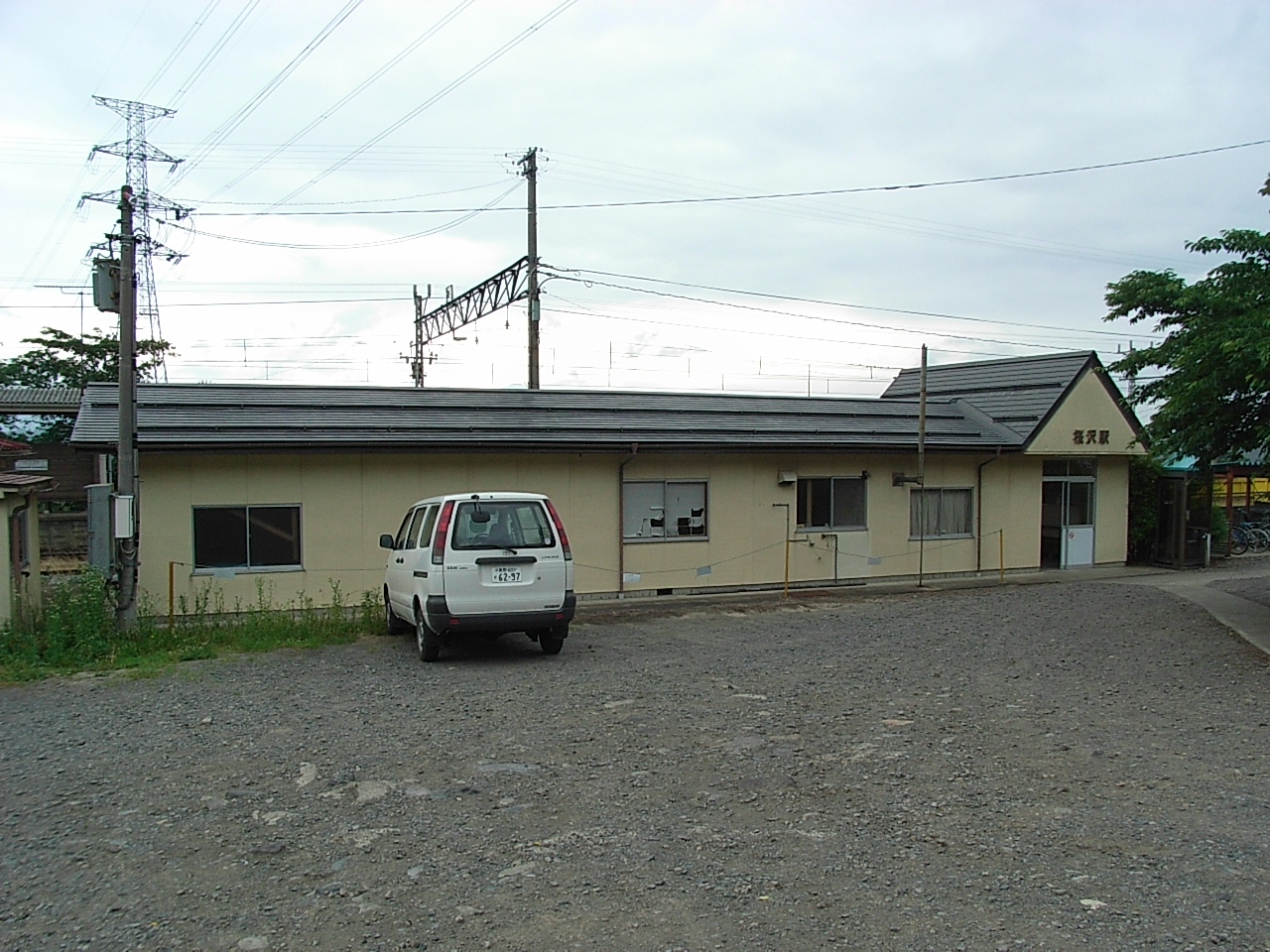
- Sakurasawa Station in June 2009

General information
- Location: 1497-2 Mitsuwa, Nakano-shi, Nagano-ken 383-0043; Japan
- Coordinates: 36°42′45.2″N 138°20′59.3″E
- Operator: Nagano Electric Railway
- Line: ■ Nagano Electric Railway Nagano Line
- Distance: 21.3 km from Nagano
- Platforms: 1 island platform
- Tracks: 2

Other information
- Status: Unstaffed
- Station code: N17
- Website: Official website

History
- Opened: 28 March 1949

Passengers
- FY2016: 55 daily
Location
- Location within Nagano Prefecture Location within Japan

Sakurasawa Station (桜沢駅, Sakurasawa-eki) is a railway station in the city of Nakano, Nagano, Japan, operated by the private railway operating company Nagano Electric Railway.

== Lines ==
Sakurasawa Station is a station on the Nagano Electric Railway Nagano Line and is 21.3 kilometers from the terminus of the line at Nagano Station.

== Station layout ==
The station consists of one ground-level island platform connected to the station building by a level crossing. The station is unattended.

=== Platforms ===
“station side"	■ Nagano Electric Railway Nagano Line	for Nagano
“opposite side"	■ Nagano Electric Railway Nagano Line	for Yudanaka

== Adjacent stations ==
«	Service	»
Nagano Electric Railway
Express-A: Does not stop at this station
Express-B: Does not stop at this station
Tsusumi	Local	Entoku

== History ==
The station opened on 28 March 1949.

== Passenger statistics ==
In fiscal 2015, the station was used by an average of 55 passengers daily (boarding passengers only).

== Surrounding area ==
- Entoku Elementary School

== See also ==
- List of railway stations in Japan
