= Enrei Tunnel =

Railway tunnel in Honshu, Japan

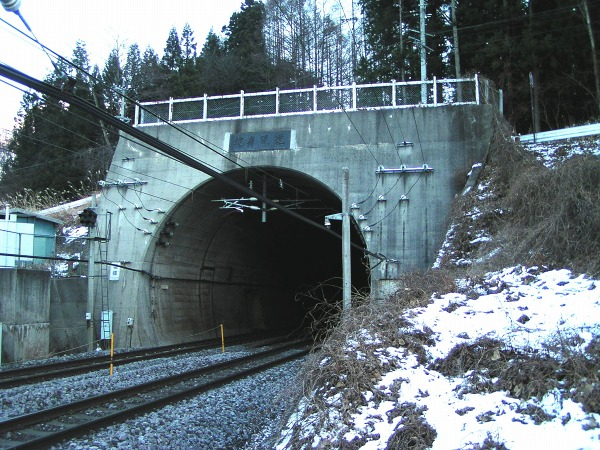
- Enrei Tunnel, Nagano
- Interactive map of Enrei Tunnel

Overview
- Line: Chūō Main Line
- Location: between Okaya Station, Okaya, Nagano and Midoriko Station, Shiojiri, Nagano
- Coordinates: 36°5′20.5038″N 137°59′19.5108″E
- Status: active

Operation
- Opened: 1983
- Operator: East Japan Railway Company
- Traffic: Railway
- Character: Passenger and Freight

Technical
- Line length: 5.994 km (3.724 mi)
- No. of tracks: 2

Enrei Tunnel on Chuo Main Line

Enrei Tunnel (塩嶺トンネル; えんれいトンネル) is a tunnel on the JR's Chuo Main Line in Japan that runs from Okaya, Nagano to Shiojiri, Nagano in Nagano prefecture with approximate length of 5.994 km.

It was completed and opened in 1983. Its construction took 14 years, and reduced the travel distance between Okaya and Shiojiri by about 16 km.

== See also ==
- List of tunnels in Japan
- Seikan Tunnel Tappi Shakō Line
- Sakhalin–Hokkaido Tunnel
- Bohai Strait tunnel
