= Chikuma, Nagano =

Chikuma 千曲市
- City
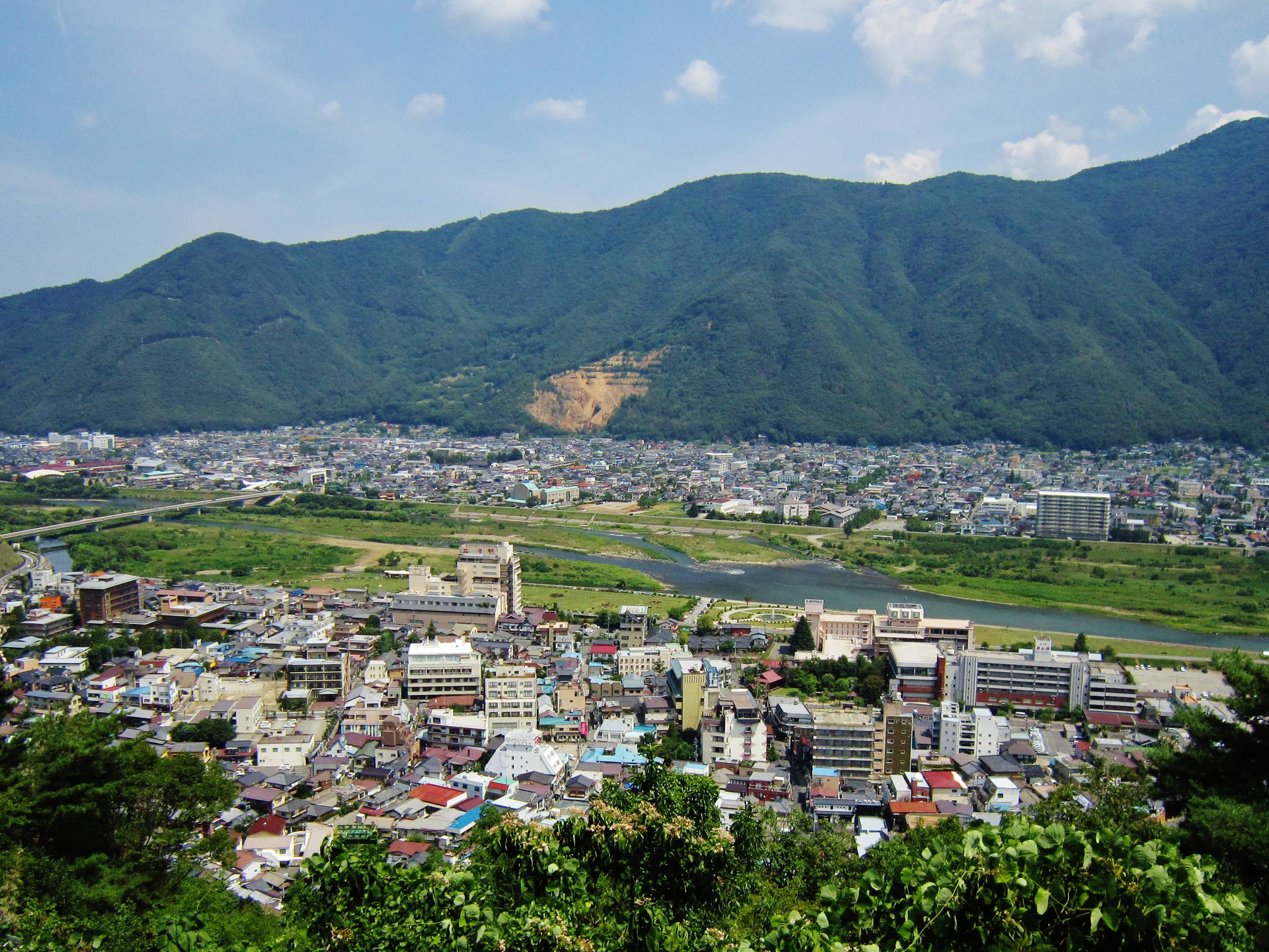
- View of downtown Chikuma and Togura-Kamiyamada Spa

- Flag Seal

- Location of Chikuma in Nagano Prefecture

- Coordinates: 36°32′2″N 138°7′11.9″E
- Country: Japan
- Region: Chūbu (Kōshin'etsu)
- Prefecture: Nagano

Government
  - Mayor: Shuichi Ogawa (since November 2020)
  - Vice-Mayor: Yasuhiko Ouchi (since July 2011)

Area
  - Total: 119.79 km^{2} (46.25 sq mi)

Population (March 2023)
  - Total: 58,124
  - Density: 485.22/km^{2} (1,256.7/sq mi)
- Time zone: UTC+9 (Japan Standard Time)
- Symbols
  - Tree: Siberian apricot
  - Flower: Shibateranthis pinnatifida
- Phone number: 026-273-1111
- Address: 84 Kuiseke, Chikuma-shi, Nagano-ken 387-8511
- Website: Official website

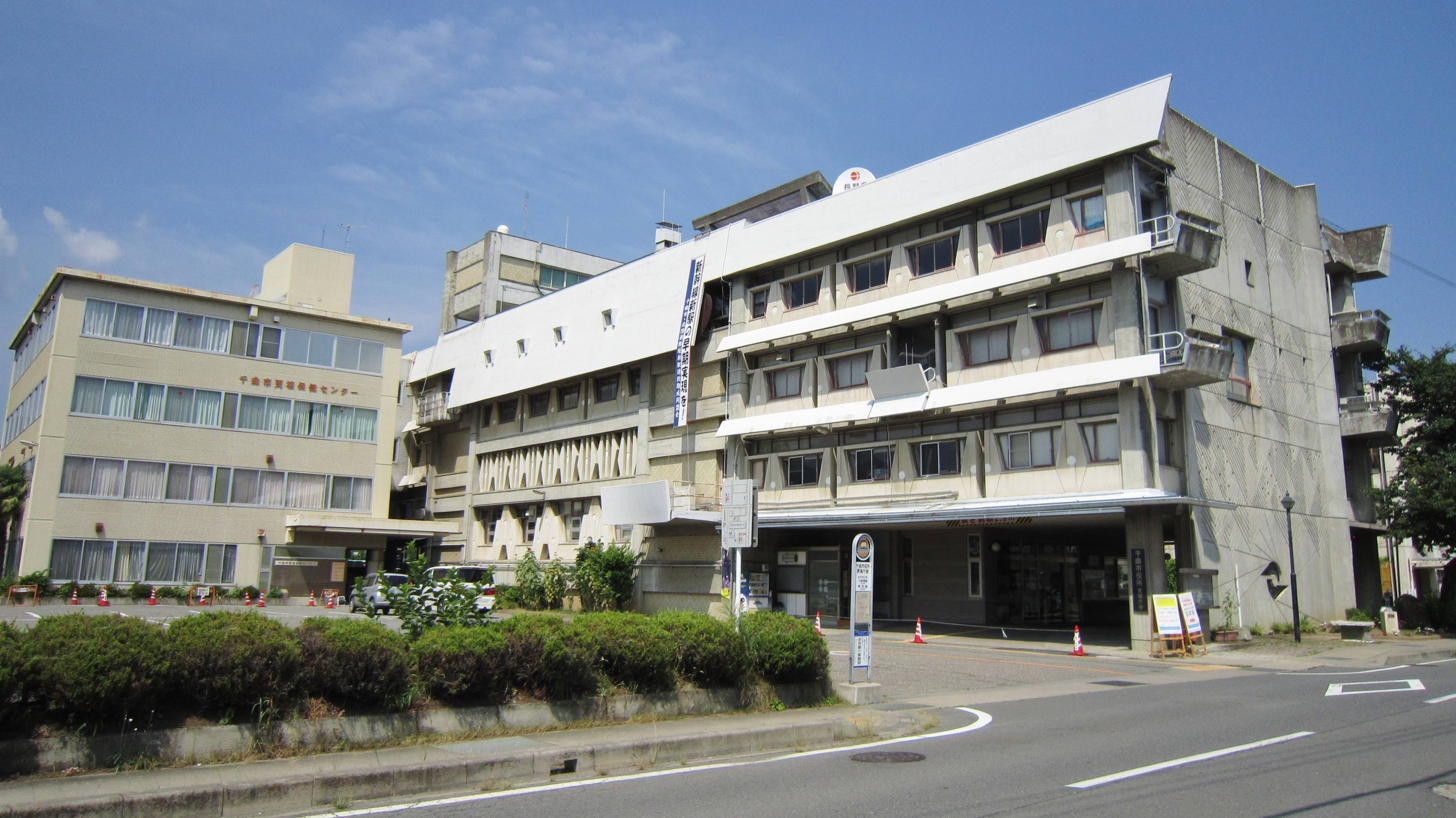
Chikuma city hall

Chikuma (千曲市, Chikuma-shi) is a city located in Nagano Prefecture, Japan. As of 1 March 2023, the city had an estimated population of 58,124 in 22,407 households, and a population density of 490 inhabitants per square kilometer (1,300/sq mi). The total area of the city was 119.79 square kilometers (46.25 sq mi).

== Geography ==
Chikuma is located in the Chikuma River valley, south of Nagano city, at the junction of the Joshin-etsu Expressway and the Nagano Expressway.

=== Climate ===
The city has a climate characterized by hot and humid summers, and relatively mild winters (Köppen climate classification Dfb). The average annual temperature in Chikuma is 9.2 °C (48.6 °F). The average annual rainfall is 1,605 mm (63.2 in) with July as the wettest month. The temperatures are highest on average in August, at around 22 °C (72 °F), and lowest in January, at around −4 °C (25 °F).

=== Surrounding municipalities ===
- Nagano Prefecture
  - Chikuhoku
  - Nagano
  - Omi
  - Sakaki
  - Ueda

== Demographics ==
Per Japanese census data, the population of Chikuma peaked around the year 2000 and has declined slightly since.

Historical population
Year	Pop.	±%
1940	44,066	—
1950	57,213	+29.8%
1960	53,972	−5.7%
1970	54,870	+1.7%
1980	60,106	+9.5%
1990	61,954	+3.1%
2000	64,549	+4.2%
2010	62,082	−3.8%
2020	58,852	−5.2%

== History ==
The area of present-day Chikuma was part of ancient Shinano Province and has been settled since prehistoric times. There are numerous burial tumuli in the city, including the Mori Shogunzukakofun, a mountaintop keyhole-shaped tomb dating from near the end of the Kofun period, which is one of the latest of its type in eastern Japan. During the Nara period, the area around the Shinano River was the settling for numerous poems in the Man'yōshū. The area was part of the holdings of Matsushiro Domain during the Edo period, and also prospered from a series of post stations on the pilgrimage route to the famed Zenkō-ji temple. The modern city of Chikuma was founded on September 1, 2003 by the merger of the former city of Koshoku, the town of Kamiyamada (from Sarashina District), and the town of Togura (from Hanishina District).

== Government ==
Chikuma has a mayor-council form of government with a directly elected mayor and a unicameral city legislature of 24 members.

== Economy ==
Chikuma is known for its production of knitted goods, food processing and light machinery manufacturing. Horticulture, especially that of apricots forms an important sector of the local economy.

== Education ==
Chikuma has nine public elementary schools and four public middle schools. The city has one public high school operated by the Nagano Prefectural Board of Education, and one combined public middle/high school. The prefecture also operates one special education school.

== Transportation ==
=== Railway ===
- East Japan Railway Company - Shinonoi Line
  - Obasute
- Shinano Railway - Shinano Railway Line
  - Togura - Chikuma - Yashiro - Yashiro-kōkō-mae

=== Highway ===
- Nagano Expressway
- Jōshin-etsu Expressway
- National Route 18
- National Route 403

== Local attractions ==
- Anzu no Sato (あんずの里), or "Apricot Village", a collection of adjacent valleys containing numerous groves of apricot trees.
- Togura Kamiyamada Onsen (戸倉上山田温泉), a popular hot spring area.
- The Obasute rice terraces (姨捨の棚田, Obasute no tanada) are a Designated Cultural Landscape of Japan.
- A recreated Jōmon village in the form of an experience park (Sarashina no Sato), which offers different activities, can be visited in Chikuma.

=== Former city of Koshoku ===
Koshoku (更埴) is the largest of the three municipalities that were joined to form the current Chikuma city. Spanning the Chikuma River and bordering Nagano city to the south, it entends from the apricot fields of Anzu no Sato in the east to the highland area Hijiri Kogen in the west. Koshoku's history dates back to the Kofun Period, and several major archaeological sites remain. Later, in the Meiji Period, the inns located in Inariyama became a popular stopover for pilgrims en route to Zenkō-ji.

=== Former town of Kamiyamada ===
Kamiyamada (上山田) lies on the western bank of the Chikuma River, just north of the town of Sakaki. A popular hot spring village dating back to the 19th century, the town was one of many places of lodging on the pilgrimage route to Zenkō-ji.

=== Former town of Togura ===
Togura (戸倉) lies on the east bank of the Chikuma River, across from Kamiyamada Onsen. With a history similar to that of Kamiyamada, it contains some hot spring bath facilities as well as the area's only railway station.

== Notable people from Chikuma ==
- Junichi Kakizaki, floral artist
- Atsushi Kitagawara, architect
- Abdullah Kobayashi, professional wrestler
- Anri Kumaki, pop singer-songwriter
- Tatsumi Yoda, entertainment businessman
