= Onbashira =

Japanese festival

Onbashira Festival Shikinen Zōei Mihashira Taisai (式年造営御柱大祭)
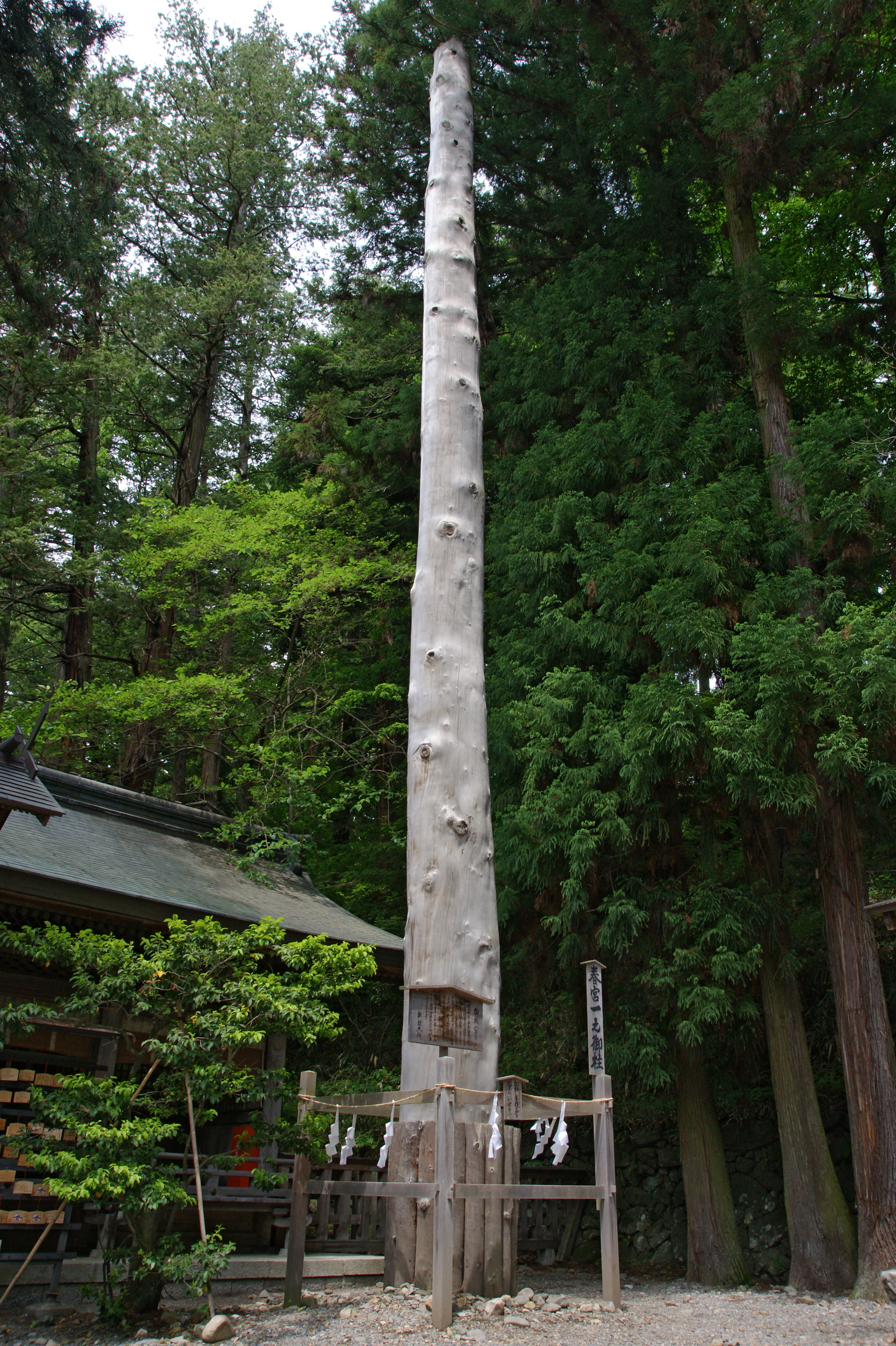
- A raised onbashira in the Shimosha Harumiya, one of the four main shrines of the Suwa Grand Shrine complex
- Frequency: Every 6 years
- Locations: Lake Suwa area (Hara, Fujimi, Chino, Suwa, Shimosuwa, Okaya), Nagano Prefecture
- Coordinates: 36°04′31″N 138°05′29″E
- Country: Japan
- Years active: circa 1,200
- Inaugurated: circa late 8th century?
- Most recent: 2022
- Next event: 2028
- Website: www.onbashirafestival.com

The Mihashira or Onbashira (Japanese: 御柱; honorific prefix 御 on-/mi- + 柱 hashira 'pillar') are four wooden posts or pillars that stand on the four corners of local shrines in the Lake Suwa area of Nagano Prefecture (historical Shinano Province), Japan. The largest and most famous set of onbashira are those that stand on the four shrines that make up the Suwa Grand Shrine complex.

By custom, the onbashira are replaced every six (traditionally reckoned as seven) years, in the years of the Monkey and the Tiger in the Chinese zodiac. In Suwa Shrine, this occurs during the Onbashira Festival (御柱祭, Onbashira-sai), which also functions as a symbolic renewal of the shrine's buildings. During the festival, sixteen specially chosen fir trees are felled and then transported down a mountain, where they are then erected at the four corners of each shrine. Festival participants ride the onbashira as they are slid down the mountain, dragged to the shrine, and raised. The festival has the reputation of being the most dangerous in Japan due to the number of people regularly injured or killed while riding the logs. This festival, which lasts several months, consists of two main segments, Yamadashi and Satobiki. Yamadashi traditionally takes place in April, and Satobiki takes place in May. For 2022, the Yamadashi portion has been cancelled due to the ongoing COVID-19 pandemic, but the Satobiki is still scheduled to begin on 3 May.

== Background ==
=== Suwa Shrine ===
What is known today as 'Suwa (Grand) Shrine', Suwa Taisha (諏訪大社), was originally two distinct sites made up of four individual shrines: the Honmiya (本宮) and the Maemiya (前宮) comprise the Upper Shrine Kamisha (上社) located in the modern-day cities of Suwa and Chino on the southeastern side of Lake Suwa, respectively, while the spring shrine (春宮, Harumiya) and autumn shrine (秋宮, Akimiya) in the town of Shimosuwa on the opposite (northern) side of the lake make up the Lower Shrine (下社, Shimosha).

The Kamisha Honmiya's hall of worship or haiden

The shrine's deity, known either as Suwa Daimyōjin or Takeminakata, was worshipped since antiquity as a god of wind and water, as well as a patron of hunting and warfare. In this latter capacity, he enjoyed a particularly fervent cult from various samurai clans during the Middle Ages. The Upper Shrine is dedicated to Suwa Daimyōjin himself, while his consort, the goddess Yasakatome, is worshipped in the Lower Shrine.

Like others among Japan's oldest shrines, the Kamisha Honmiya and the two shrines of the Shimosha do not have a honden, the building that normally enshrines the shrine deity. Instead, the Upper Shrine's objects of worship were the sacred mountain behind the Honmiya, a sacred rock (磐座, iwakura) upon which Suwa Daimyōjin was thought to descend, and the shrine's former high priest or Ōhōri 大祝 who was considered to be the physical incarnation of the god himself. This was later joined by two Buddhist structures (no longer extant since the Meiji period): a stone pagoda in the shrine's inner sanctum known as the Tettō (鉄塔), 'iron tower', and a sanctuary to the bodhisattva Samantabhadra (Fugen)—Suwa Daimyōjin being considered to be a manifestation of this bodhisattva—on the sacred mountain. Meanwhile, the Lower Shrine's objects of worship are sacred trees: a sugi tree in the Harumiya, and a yew tree in the Akimiya.

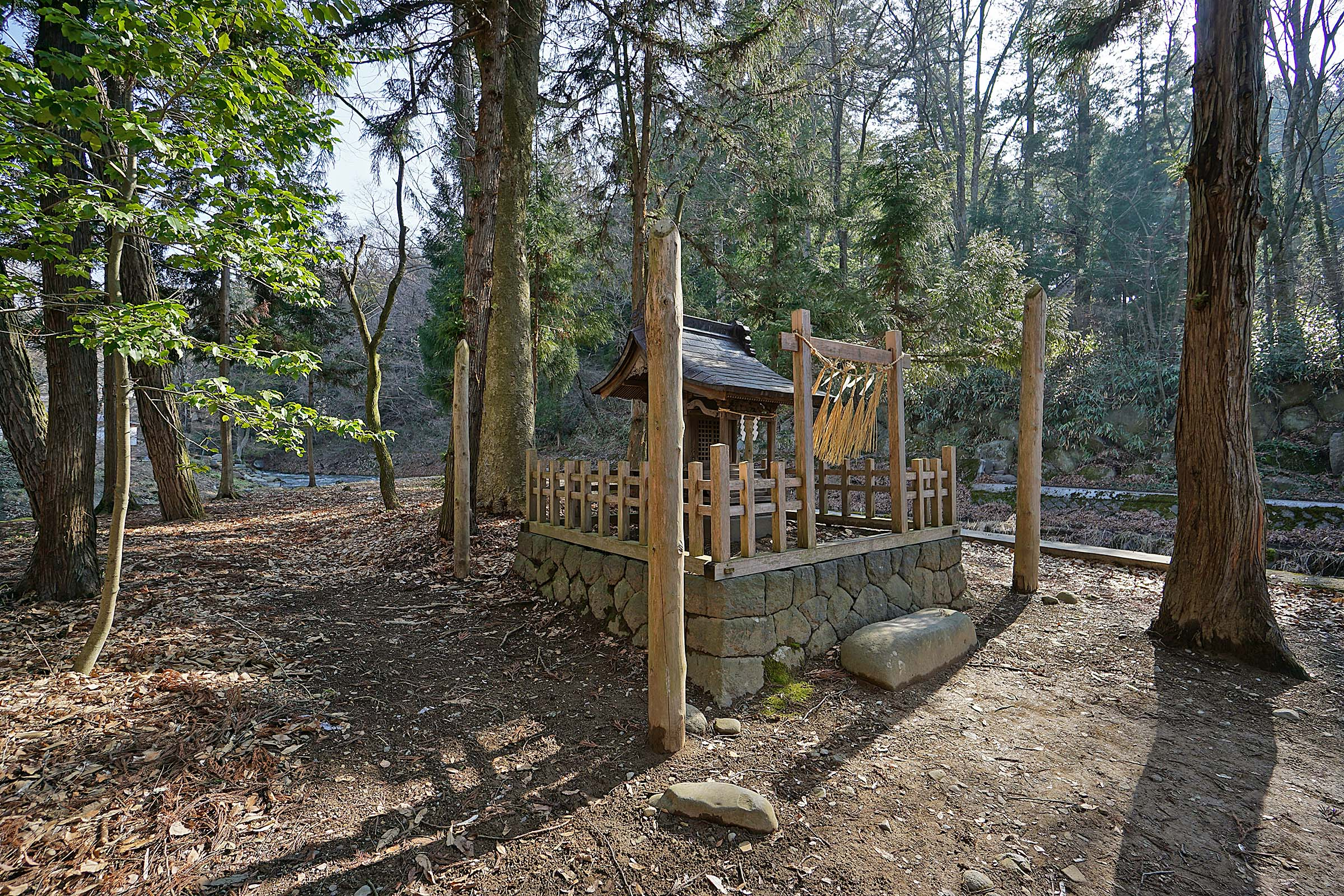
Onbashira in Ukishima Shrine, Shimosuwa

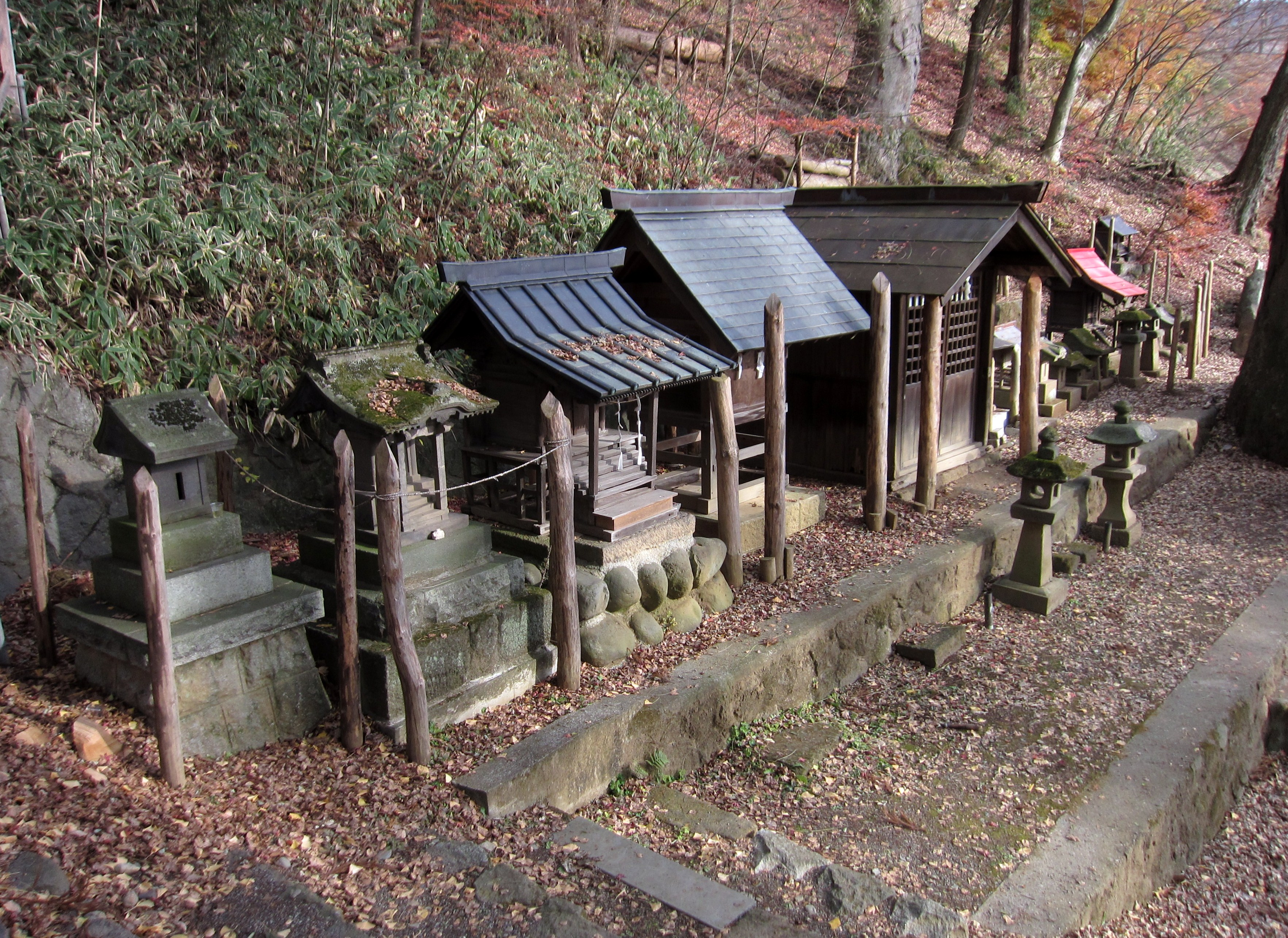
Small onbashira on miniature shrines in Tenaga Shrine, Suwa City

Unlike today, there were originally far fewer buildings in the precincts: in the Kamisha Honmiya's case, medieval records for instance indicate that the shrine's most sacred area where a worship hall (haiden) now stands once featured only a torii gate and the god's dwelling place, the iwakura, demarcated by a kind of fence (kakusu (格子)).

=== The onbashira ===
All four shrines of the Suwa Shrine complex are each surrounded on their four corners by large wooden pillars known as the onbashira. These pillars are all currently made out of momi fir tree trunks, though wood from other trees such as larch or Japanese cedar were also used in the past.

The largest of a set of four onbashira, measuring 5 jō and 5 shaku (approx. 16.6 meters) high, is designated as the 'first pillar' or ichi no hashira (一の柱), while the remaining three pillars—the second pillar (二の柱, ni no hashira), third pillar (三の柱, san no hashira), and fourth pillar (四の柱, yon no hashira)—are five jō (approx. 15 m), four jō and five shaku (approx. 13.6 m), and four jō (approx. 12 m), respectively.

An onbashira's girth is traditionally determined by measuring the uncut tree's circumference at eye level, medōri (目通り). The actual thickness of the logs used may vary: the largest onbashira in recent history in terms of girth is the Akimiya's ichi no hashira used in the festival of 1950 (Shōwa 25).

Aside from the large onbashira at Suwa Shrine, smaller onbashira are also erected in its branch shrines throughout the country. Onbashira are also found in many local shrines in historical Suwa district (see pictures on left).

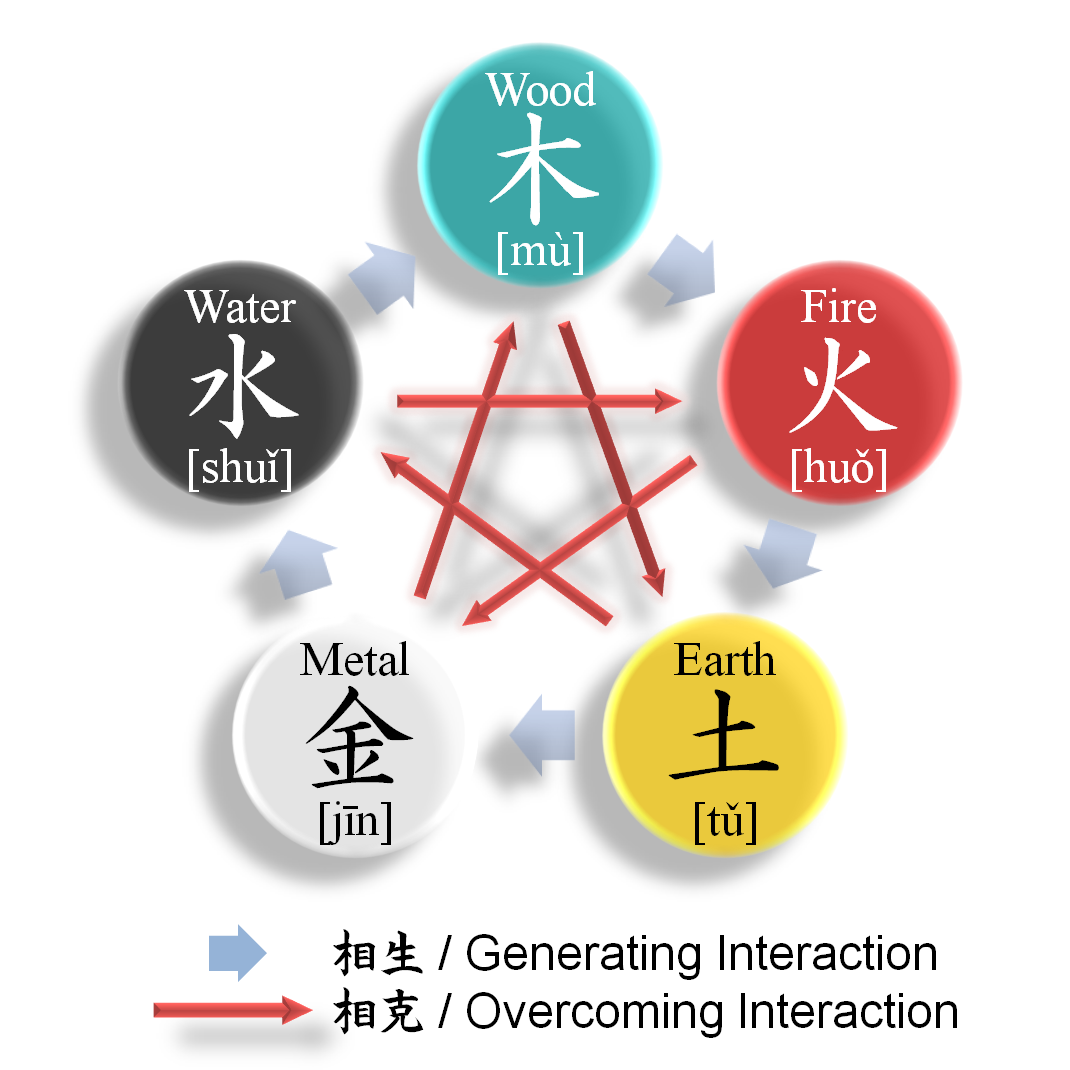
Diagram of the interactions between the five Chinese elements or Wu Xing

==== Origins and symbolism ====
The onbashira's origins and original purpose are shrouded in mystery. They have been variously interpreted among other things as relics of much larger structures, a kind of barrier or boundary marker (cf. the Korean jangseung), as totem poles, or even as symbolic substitutes for rebuilding the entire shrine complex. Some scholars meanwhile consider the practice of erecting sacred pillars to derive ultimately from prehistoric tree worship, citing the remains of wooden poles or slabs discovered in various Jōmon period sites in apparently ritualistic contexts as potential parallels to the Suwa onbashira.

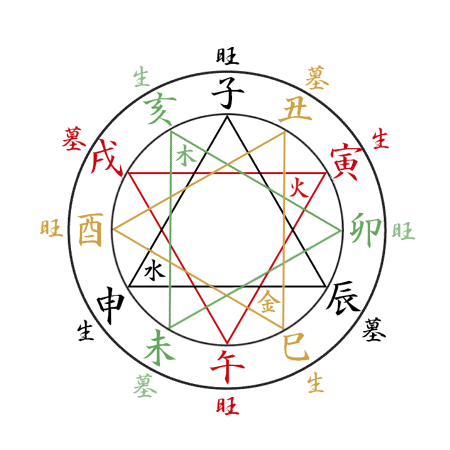
Diagram of the Three Unities (三合, Japanese: Sangō); the three branch signs under the fire element (三合火局) – Tiger (寅), Horse (午) and Dog (戌) – are marked in red.

===== Onbashira and Chinese philosophy =====
Possible influences by the Chinese theory of the five elements and the concept of the Earthly Branches in the ceremony of erecting onbashira—at least that of the Upper Shrine—have been observed. For instance, the ritual roughly reflects the elements' cycle of generation (wood begets fire, fire begets earth, earth begets metal), in that the Upper Shrine's onbashira are made out of trees from a mountain to the east (associated with the element of wood) and are brought to the shrine, located south (fire) of Lake Suwa (north, water) in order to replace old onbashira (earth), which are taken down and brought to Hachiryū Shrine in the former village of Chū-kaneko (中金子, with 金 meaning metal), now a part of Suwa City. The custom of hammering ornamental sickles (nagikama) to the trees selected to become onbashira has also been linked to the idea of the element of metal overcoming wood, with the sickle being thought to pacify or 'cut' violent winds, which is associated with the wood element (cf. Suwa Daimyōjin being a wind god).

The generating relationship between wood and fire and their connection with the Suwa deity is also seen in a medieval document known as the Suwa Shichū (陬波私注), which associates Suwa Daimyōjin's birth and later 'disappearance' with the year of the Yang Wood Horse, kinoe-uma (甲午), the Horse being associated with the south, the direction of fire.

The timing of the Onbashira Festival, which falls during the Zodiac years of the Tiger and the Monkey, and the rebuilding of the Upper Shrine's hōden or treasure halls (see below) at noon—the hour of the Horse—are seen as corresponding with the concept of the Three Unities (三合, Chinese: Sānhé, Japanese: Sangō), where four of the five elements are assigned three branch signs each, representing 'birth' (長生), 'peak' (帝旺), and 'burial' (墓). The zodiac signs of the Tiger and the Horse are both associated with the 'birth' and 'peak' aspects of fire.

== History of the festival ==
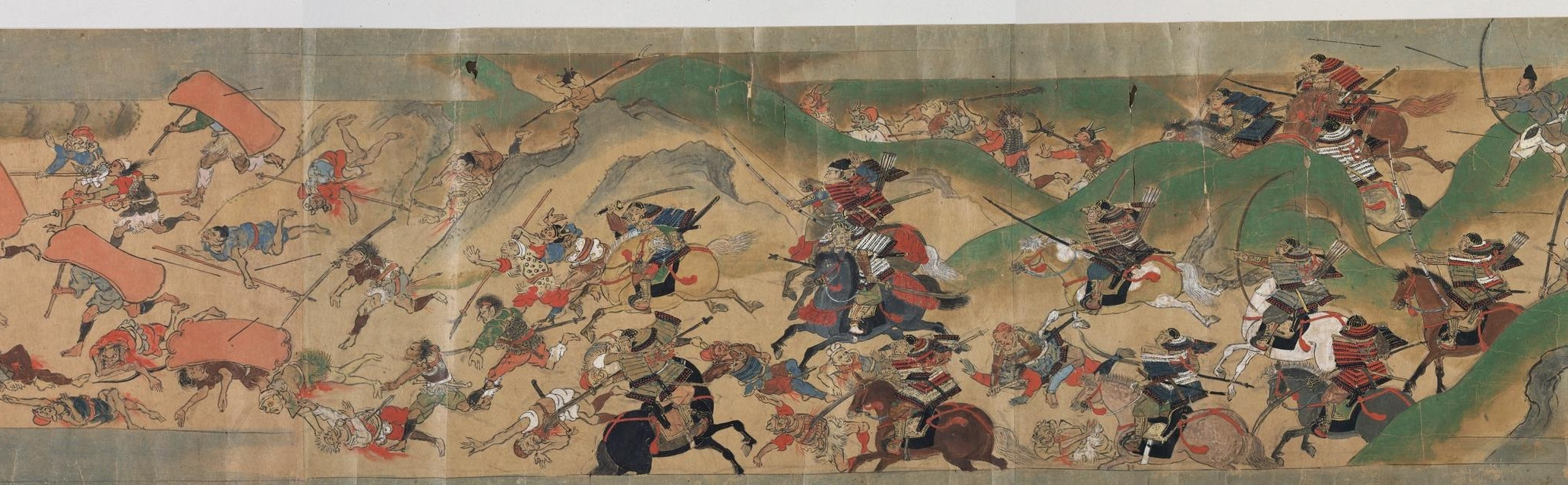
The general Sakanoue no Tamuramaro was said to have been assisted in his war against the Emishi by the deity of Suwa (Detail from a scene in the Kiyomizu-dera Engi Emaki)

=== Origins ===
Suwa Shrine's Onbashira Festival, officially known as the Shikinen Zōei Mihashira Taisai (式年造営御柱大祭, lit. "Great Festival (of the) Periodic Building (of the Shrines and the) Mihashira"), is popularly reckoned to have a 1,200 year history. The Suwa Daimyōjin Ekotoba (written 1356) claims that the custom of reconstructing (zōei (造営)) shrine edifices during the years of the Monkey and the Tiger started during the reign of Emperor Kanmu in the late 8th to early 9th century (early Heian period).

One legend concerning Suwa Daimyōjin claims that he appeared to the general Sakanoue no Tamuramaro, appointed by Emperor Kanmu to subjugate the indigenous Emishi of northeastern Japan. In thanksgiving for the god's miraculous assistance in Tamuramaro's campaign, the imperial court was said to have decreed the establishment of the various religious ceremonies of Suwa Shrine.

=== Kamakura, Muromachi, and Sengoku periods ===
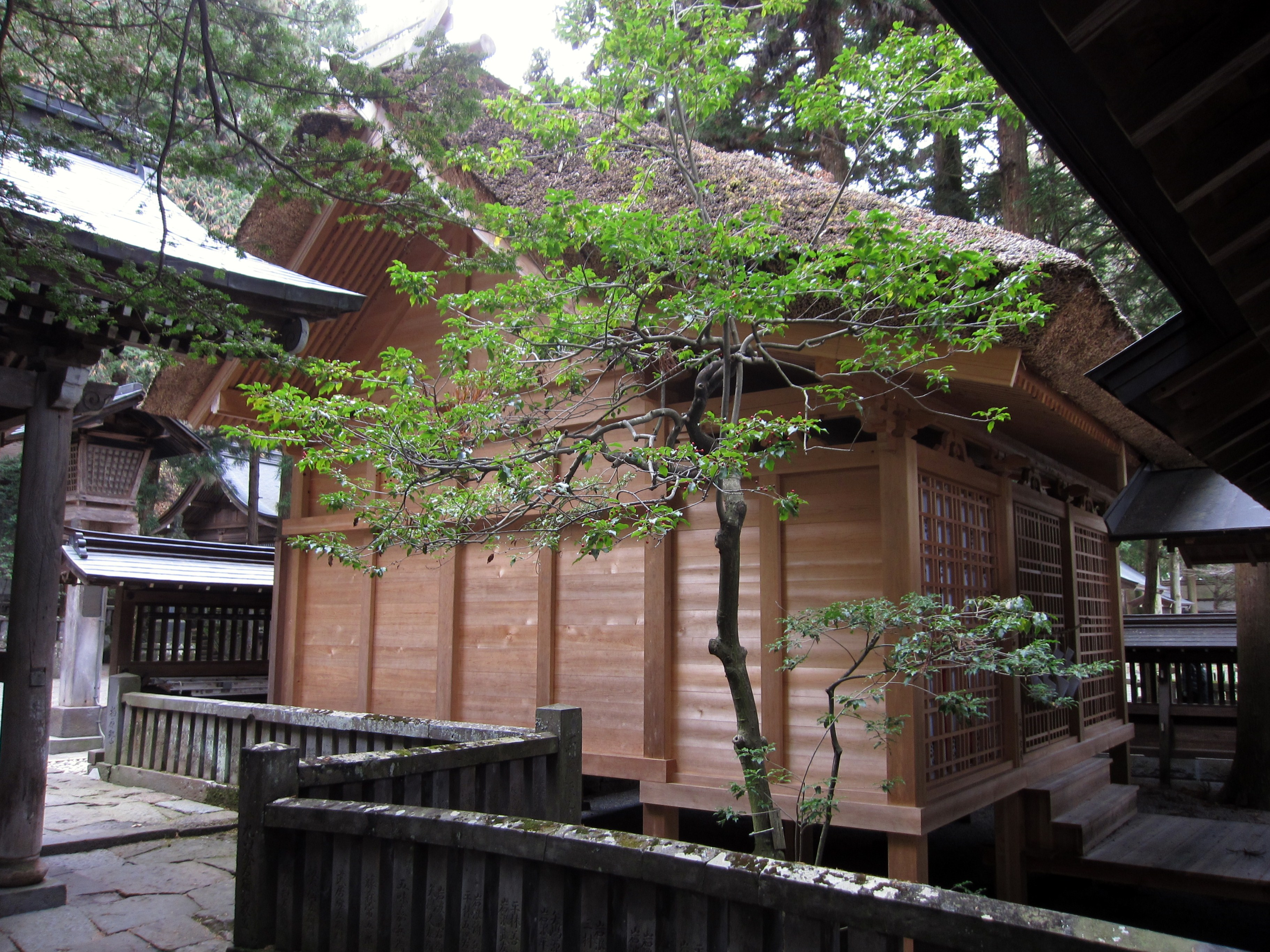
The western hōden or 'treasure hall' (西宝殿) located in the Kamisha Honmiya. Both it and the eastern hōden (東宝殿) beside it are traditionally rebuilt in turns every six years: during an onbashira year the mikoshi inside either one of these two hōden is transferred to the other structure, where it will stay for six years; the emptied hōden is then torn down, rebuilt, and remains unoccupied for as long as the mikoshi is in the other building. In all, a given hōden stands for twelve years before it is reconstructed.

According to the Suwa Daimyōjin Ekotoba, the periodic rebuilding (zōei (造営)) of structures (every six years) in the Upper and Lower Shrines such as the 'treasure halls' or hōden (宝殿) where the shrines' mikoshi are kept was decreed to be a 'perpetual duty' (eidai no kayaku (永代の課役)) of the whole province of Shinano, with the inhabitants of the various districts of the province responsible for organizing the event. Such was indeed the case until the shrines experienced a period of decline during the Sengoku period.

The Ekotoba describes the preparations for the rebuilding thus: at the onset of spring, the governor (kokushi) of Shinano would appoint officials who collected the necessary funds from the populace from checkpoints or toll booths (seki (関)) set up in provincial roads in exchange for mifu (御符), official certifications stamped with the sacred seals of the Upper and Lower Shrines. The rebuilding of the shrines was undertaken by artisans assembled from all across the province, while thousands of people were assigned the task of erecting the onbashira into place, one or two thousand for each pillar.

Due to the exorbitant amount of money required for the project, locals traditionally avoided or postponed special occasions like marriages, coming-of-age ceremonies, or even funerals during the year. In addition, observance of the event in the proper time was considered essential: failure to obey these taboos was thought to incur divine punishment.

The upheavals of the Sengoku period threatened Suwa Shrine and its religious rites. Indeed, the shrine's ceremonies would have been lost to oblivion had not the warlord Takeda Shingen, a staunch devotee of the Suwa deity, took steps to revive their performance. In 1565, after he had fully conquered the whole of Shinano Province, Shingen issued an order for the reinstitution of the religious rites of both the Kamisha and the Shimosha, the zōei being one of them.

In 1582 (Tenshō 10), the eldest son of Oda Nobunaga, Nobutada, led an army into Takeda-controlled Shinano and burned the Upper Shrine of Suwa to the ground. The shrine, which was destroyed in the invasion, was subsequently rebuilt on schedule two years later, in 1584 (Tenshō 12, year of the Yang Wood Monkey).

=== Edo period onwards ===
The introduction of the bakuhan system in the Edo period effectively ended the 'perpetual' obligation of periodically rebuilding the shrines and replacing their onbashira being imposed on the whole province of Shinano. Since then, these duties became the sole affair of the villages of Suwa (a.k.a. Takashima) Domain, where the shrines were.

It is from around the Edo and the following Meiji periods that the raising of the onbashira gradually turned into a grand festival, overshadowing the zōei itself. It is thought that some of the current practices associated with the event may have been influenced by the rebuilding ceremony practiced at Ise Shrine. By the later half of the period, viewing galleries were being built for the huge crowds who gathered to witness the festival.

The establishment of State Shinto after the Meiji Restoration in 1868 changed the religious landscape of Suwa. As the union between Shinto and Buddhism that existed then at the shrines—as in most places in Japan—was brought to an end and control over the Upper and Lower Shrines (merged into a single institution in 1871) was turned over from local priestly families to the government, the Onbashira Festival itself underwent massive changes.

Formerly, the task of procuring and raising the onbashira were assigned to different villages every time via mutual agreement. In 1890, it was decided that lottery will be used henceforth to determine which villages will be assigned which onbashira during a given festival. While the villages under the Upper Shrine's jurisdiction (currently districts in the modern-day cities of Chino and Suwa, the town of Fujimi, and the village of Hara) are still allotted their respective onbashira via lottery to this very day, the responsible villages for the Lower Shrine's onbashira soon decided to do away with the lottery for the 1902 festival and instead permanently assigned particular villages to a particular onbashira, an arrangement that continues to this day.

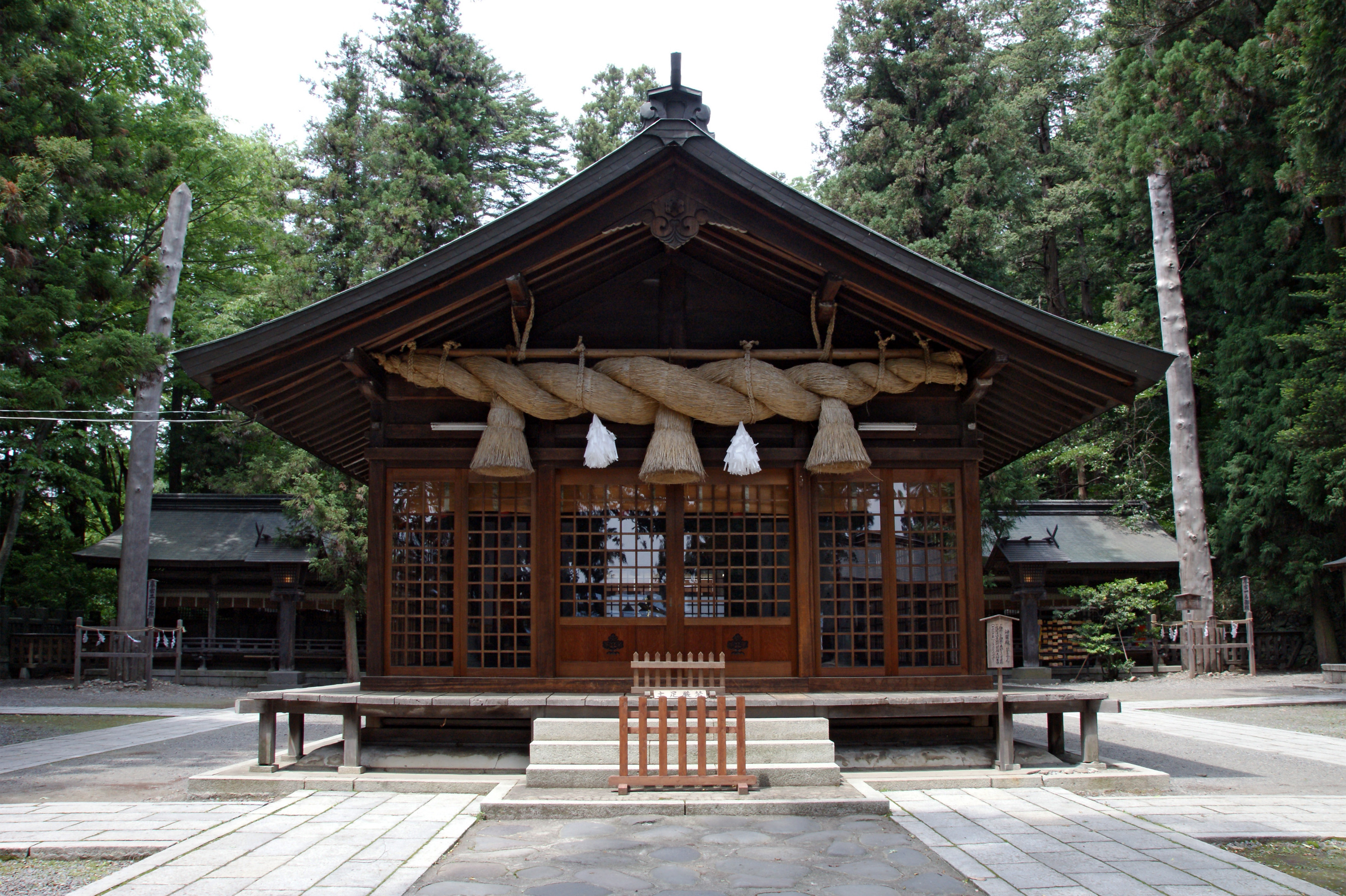
The Shimosha Harumiya's kagura hall with two onbashira visible in the background.

The Lower Shrine's iconic Kiotoshi, wherein the onbashira are slid down a steep hill (the Kiotoshi-zaka) as men attempt to ride it, originated from the Meiji period onwards. Unlike the Upper Shrine, which had a specially designated area from which to obtain the wooden logs, the Lower Shrine originally used tree trunks obtained from different nearby mountains; it was not until 1895 that the forest of Higashimata (東俣) in Shimosuwa was established as the sole source for the Lower Shrine's onbashira and the current route which passes through the hill was adopted.

In 1914 (Taishō 3), 21-year-old Tomoya Nakamura (中村知也) became the first known person to ride an onbashira as it was being slid down the Kiotoshi-zaka. He is said to have repeated the same feat during the subsequent five festivals, making him a local legend. It apparently took some time for others to imitate Nakamura: a photograph attached to a newspaper article about the festival in 1920 distinctly shows no one on the onbashira depicted. It was only from the festivals of 1926 and 1932 that reports of log-riding began to appear.

During the final years of World War II, as Japan's military situation became more desperate, the government began altering its original conscription laws, so that in 1943, all male students over the age of 20 became subject to the draft, whereas they had formerly been exempted. By 1944, men under 20—some as young as 15—were being pressured to serve in the military. Due to the lack of able-bodied adult men, the Onbashira Festival of 1944 (Shōwa 19) was performed mainly by women (who formerly did not take part in the proceedings) and by older men who were not pressed into military service. During the festival, then-mayor of Shimosuwa, Tokichi Takagi (高木十吉), died from an accident during the Yamadashi. It has since become customary to pray for safety during the proceedings before a monument dedicated to his memory.

The festival of 1950 (Shōwa 25), the first to be held after the war, marked the first time women were officially allowed to participate in the event.

== Description of the festival ==
=== Selecting the trees ===
Preparations for the festival commences with the process of selecting the trees that will be turned into onbashira, the Mitate (見立て). In the Upper Shrine's case, a preliminary inspection (Kari-mitate (仮見立)) is performed two years before a given festival, with the formal selection process (Hon-mitate (本見立)) being held a year after this.

The Upper Shrine's onbashira are made from momi fir trees procured from Mount Okoya (Okoya-san (御小屋山))—part of the Southern Yatsugatake Mountains—in the village of Hara, while those of the Lower Shrine are taken from the forest of Higashimata (東俣) in the town of Shimosuwa.

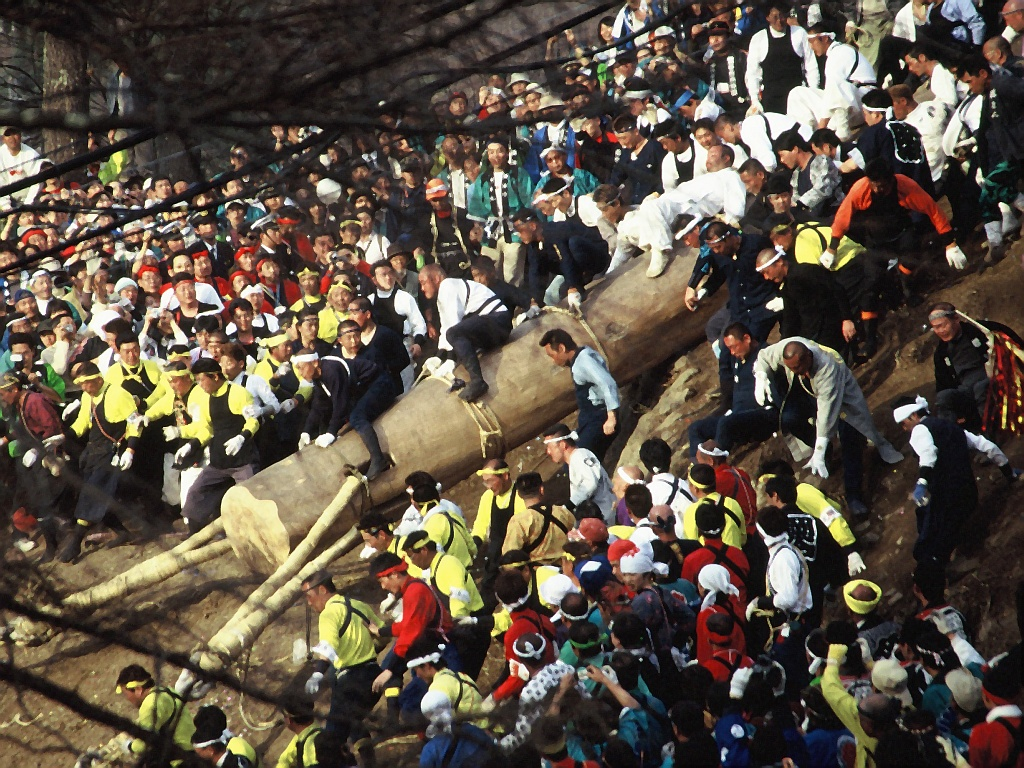
Yamadashi tree drop

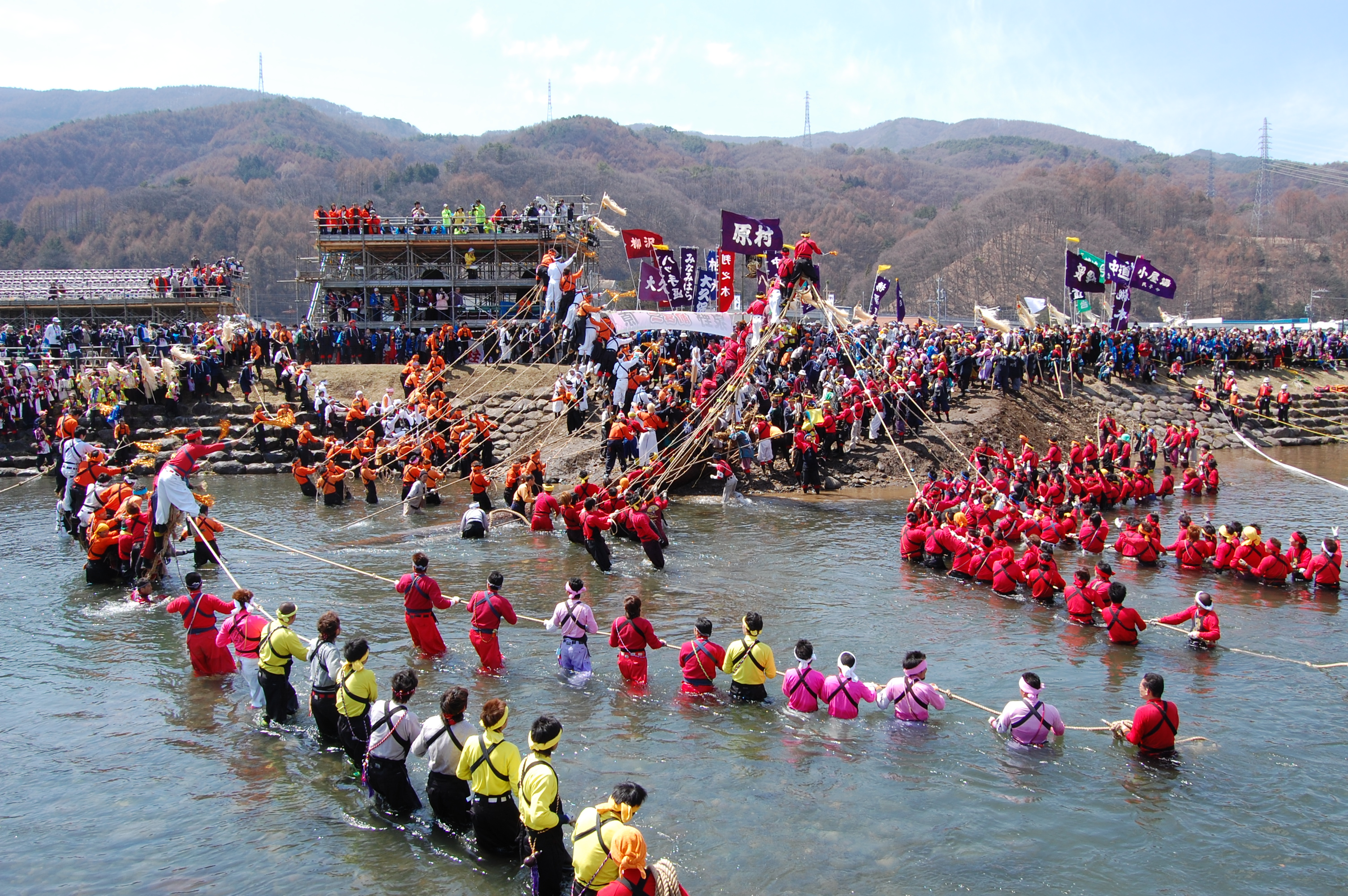
Pulling onbashira across river

=== Yamadashi ===
Yamadashi literally means "coming out of the mountains". Sixteen fir trees, usually about 17 to 19 metres (56 to 62 ft) tall, are selected and cut down in a Shinto ceremony using specially made axes and adzes. The logs are decorated in red and white regalia, the traditional colors of Shinto ceremonies, and ropes are attached. During Yamadashi, teams of people drag the logs down the mountain towards the shrine. The course of the logs goes over rough terrain, and at certain points the logs must be skidded or dropped down steep slopes. Young men prove their bravery by riding the logs, which can weigh as much as 12 tons, down the hill in a ceremony known as Kiotoshi ("tree falling").

=== Satobiki ===
During Satobiki, held about a month later, the logs are paraded to the four shrine buildings where they will be erected: Honmiya, Maemiya, Harumiya, and Akimiya. Four onbashira are erected at each building, one at each corner. The logs are raised with ropes by hand, and while they are being raised, a ceremonial group of log bearers ride the logs and sing and perform other feats. This ceremony was performed as part of the opening ceremonies of the 1998 Winter Olympics in Nagano.

After the two festivals, there is an important event, the "Building of Hoden". This event, which marks the end of Onbashira, is not as famous as Yamadashi and Satobiki.

== Incidents ==
Onbashira has a reputation for being the most dangerous festival in Japan, and it has led to the injury and death of participants. There were fatal incidents in 1980, 1986, 1992, 2010, and 2016. In 1992, two men drowned while a log was being pulled across a river. In 2010, two men, Noritoshi Masuzawa, 45, and Kazuya Hirata, 33, died after falling from a height of 10 metres (33 ft) as a tree trunk was being raised on the grounds of the Suwa Grand Shrine. Two other men were injured in the same accident, which organizers say occurred when a guide-wire supporting the 17-metre (56 ft) tree gave way. In 2016, one man died falling from a tree as it was being raised at the shrine.

== See also ==
- Mishaguji
- Suwa taisha
- Takeminakata
- Totem pole

== Works cited ==
- Furukawa, Sadao (1988). 図説長野県の歴史 (Zusetsu Nagano-ken no Rekishi). Kawade Shobō Shinsha. ISBN 978-4309611204.
- Inoue, Takami (2003). "The Interaction between Buddhist and Shinto Traditions at Suwa Shrine." In Rambellli, Fabio (29 August 2003). Teuuwen, Mark (ed.). Buddhas and Kami in Japan: Honji Suijaku as a Combinatory Paradigm. Routledge. ISBN 978-1134431236.
- Ishikawa, Shunsuke (2008). "祭りにおける「イベント」の形成に関する基礎研究: 諏訪大社下社御柱祭「木落し」の事例から (The Basic Study for "Event" In Traditional Festival: A Case Study: "Kiotoshi" of Onbashira-matsuri Festival)" (PDF). Journal of the Nagoya University Graduate School of Humanities (in Japanese): 112. ISSN 0910-9803. Archived from the original (PDF) on 2017-12-13.
- Konishi, Jin'ichi (2014). A History of Japanese Literature, Volume 3: The High Middle Ages. Princeton University Press. ISBN 978-1400861828.
- Matsui, Keisuke (2013). Geography of Religion in Japan: Religious Space, Landscape, and Behavior. Springer Science & Business Media. ISBN 978-4431545507.
- Miyasaka, Mitsuaki (1992). 諏訪大社の御柱と年中行事 (Suwa Taisha no Onbashira to Nenchū-gyōji). Nagano: Kyōdo Shuppansha. ISBN 978-4876631780.
- Muraoka, Geppo (1969). 諏訪の祭神 (Suwa no Saijin). Tokyo: Yuzankaku Shuppan.
- Tanigawa, Ken'ichi, ed. (1987). 日本の神々―神社と聖地〈9〉美濃・飛騨・信濃 (Nihon no kamigami: Jinja to seichi, vol. 9: Mino, Hida, Shinano). Hakusuisha. ISBN 978-4-560-02509-3.
- Turnbull, Stephen (2012). Nagashino 1575: Slaughter at the Barricades. Bloomsbury Publishing. ISBN 978-1782002291.
- Wakita, Haruko (2007). "The Creation of Fabricated Myths in the Medieval Age: An Examination of Shintoshu, Histories (Engi), Noh Plays, and Other Sources" (PDF). In Baxter, James C.; Fogel, Joshua A. (eds.). Writing Histories in Japan. Texts and Their Transformations from Ancient Times through the Meiji Era. International Research Center for Japanese Studies. p. 92. Archived from the original (PDF) on 2016-08-22.
- Yamashita, Masaharu (2006). "訓読・諏訪大明神絵詞 (一) (Kundoku: Suwa Daimyōjjn Ekotoba 01)" (PDF). Annual report of the Institute of Cultural Sciences, Risshō University (16): 13–14. Archived from the original (PDF) on 2019-01-07.
- Yazaki, Takenori, ed. (1986). 諏訪大社 (Suwa Taisha). 銀河グラフィック選書 (Ginga gurafikku sensho). Vol. 3. Ginga Shobō.
