= Idojiri ruins =

Archaeological site in Japan

- 井戸尻遺跡 (Japanese)
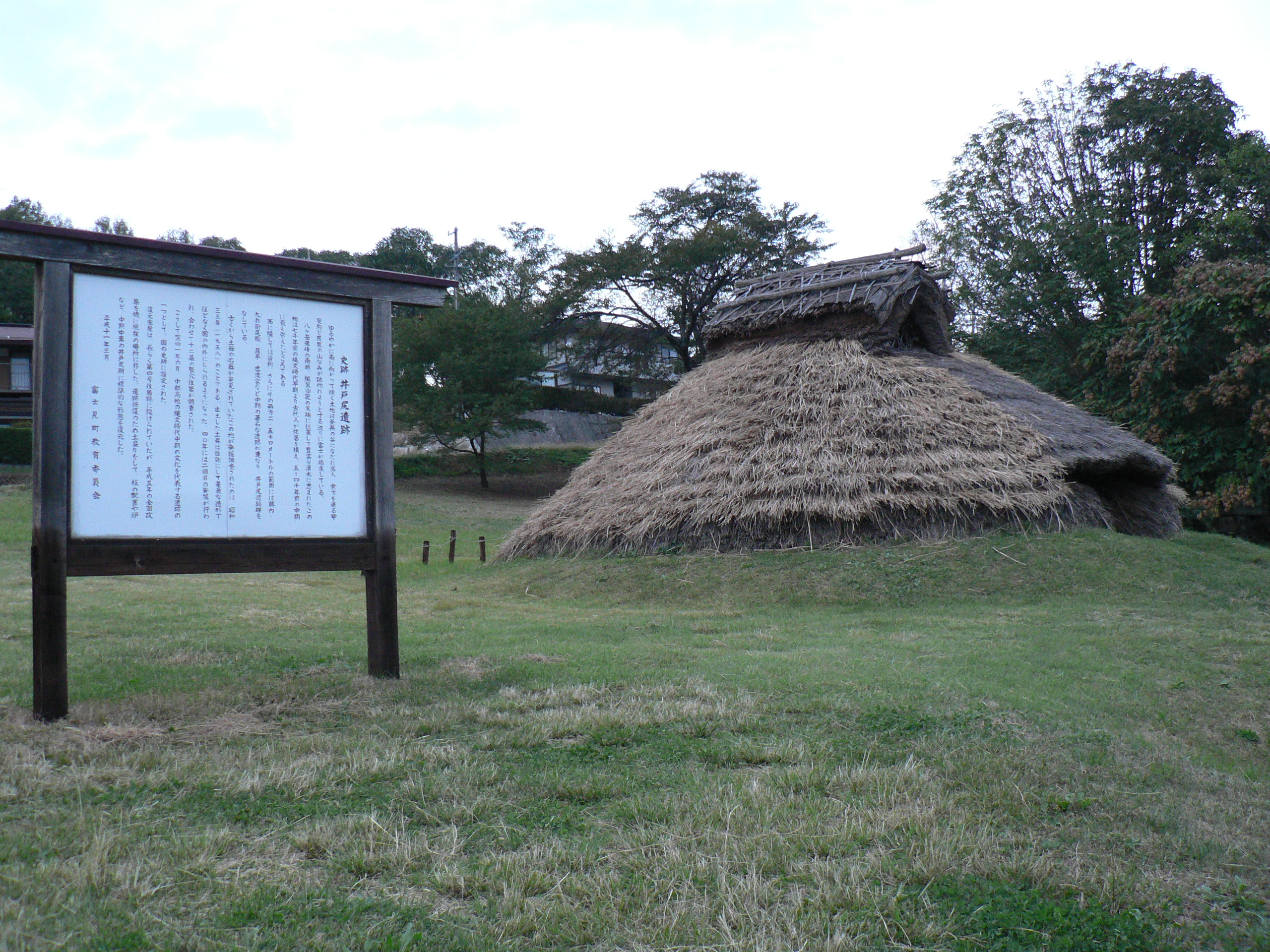
- Idojiri ruins

- Idojiri Ruins Idojiri ruins (Japan)
- 35°52′40″N 138°16′44″E
- Type: settlement
- Periods: Jōmon period
- Location: Fujimi, Nagano, Japan
- Region: Chūbu region

Site notes
- Elevation: 900 m (3,000 ft)
- Public access: yes (park and museum)

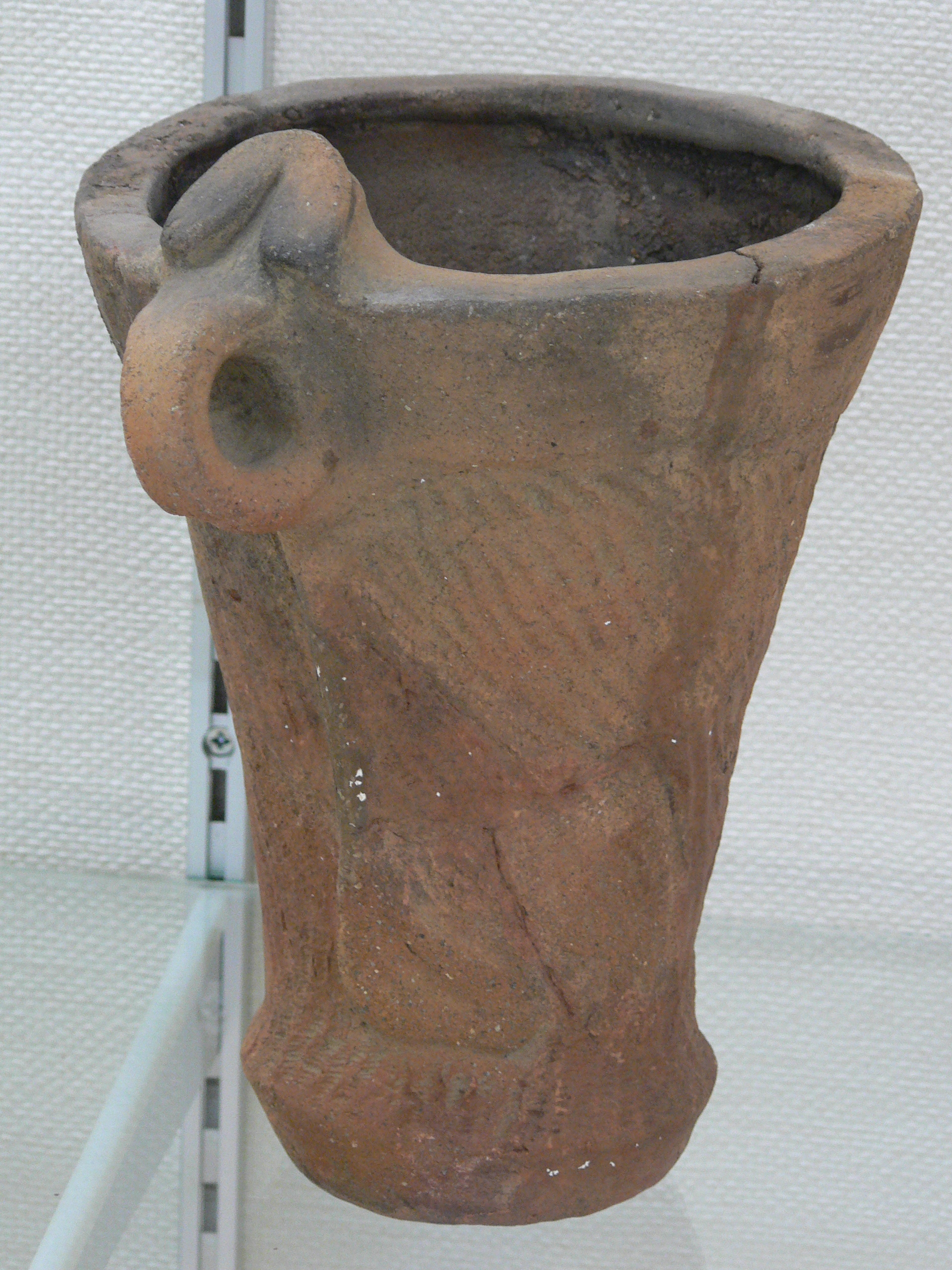
Idojiri-type Jōmon pot

The Idojiri ruins (井戸尻遺跡, Idojiri-iseki) is an archaeological site containing the ruins of a mid-Jōmon period (approximately 2500–1500 BCE) settlement located in what is now part of the town of Fujimi, Suwa District, Nagano in the Chūbu region of Japan. The site was designated a National Historic Site of Japan in 1967.

== Overview ==
The Idojiri site is located at the southeastern foot of Mount Yatsugatake at an elevation of 800 to 1000 meters, with abundant spring water, which drains on a gentle slope towards the Fuji River. The around surrounding Mount Yatsugatake has a very high concentration of settlement traces from the Jōmon period, including the Akyū ruins just to the north of this site. Over 50 middle Jōmon period ruins in the immediate area surrounding the Idojiri site because of abundant spring water.

The Idojiri site was excavated numerous times from 1949 onwards. It was found to contain the foundations for over 200 pit dwellings along with an enormous amount Jōmon pottery shards which have been used in establishing an earthenware chronology of the period, including twelve complete pottery containers with a distinctive design of abstract patterns, people, and the heads of animals. Nine of these pots were large, deep containers suitable for use as storage containers. The others appear to have been used for boiling food. Artifacts uncovered at the site include a large number of stone tools, including ten concave stones, 54 stone axes and stone dishes, which are believed to have been used for cooking and for processing of nuts and acorns. The site also contained carbonized remains from the hearths, which appear to be the remnants of burned bread.

Some of the artifacts discovered are displayed at the Idojiri Archaeological Museum (井戸尻考古館, Idojiri kōko-kan) at site. One of the pots discovered at this site was the subject of a 1972 postage stamp issued by the Japanese government. The site is open to the public as an archaeological park, with some faux restored pit dwellings. It is approximately 15 minutes on foot from Shinano-Sakai Station.

== See also ==
- List of Historic Sites of Japan (Nagano)
