= Akyū ruins =

Ruins of a Jōmon period settlement in Hara, Japan

- 阿久遺跡 (Japanese)
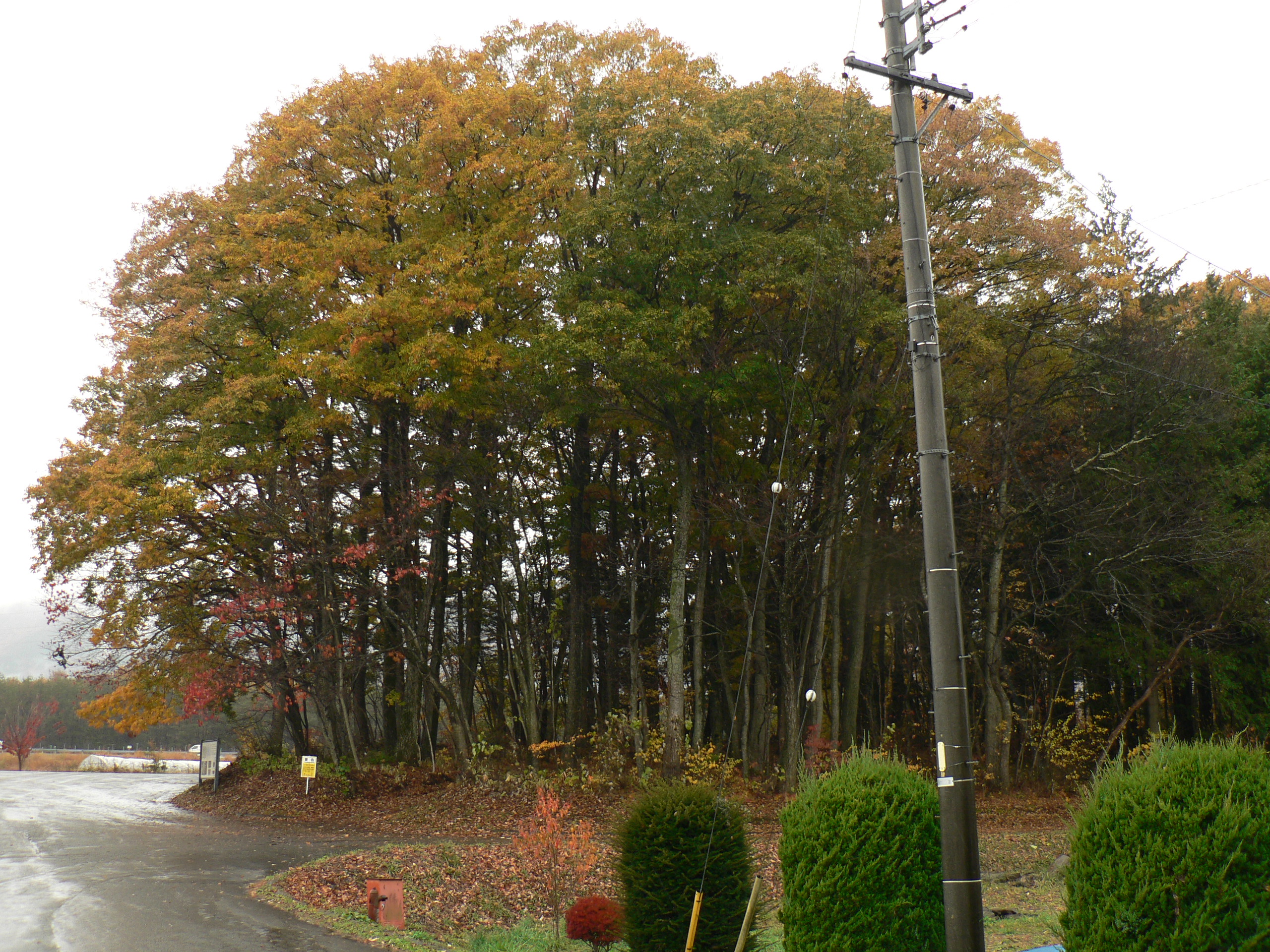
- Akyū ruins

- Akyū ruins Akyū ruins (Japan)
- 35°57′53″N 138°11′18″E
- Type: settlement
- Periods: Jōmon period
- Location: Hara, Nagano, Japan
- Region: Chūbu region

Site notes
- Public access: None

The Akyū ruins (阿久遺跡, Akyū iseki) is an archaeological site containing the ruins of a large-scale Jōmon period settlement located in the Kawagishi neighborhood of the village of Hara, Suwa District, Nagano in the Chūbu region of Japan. It contains the largest stone circle yet found in Japan. The site was designated a National Historic Site of Japan in 1979.

== Overview ==
The Akyū site is located at the southeastern foot of Mount Yatsugatake at an elevation of 904 meters, and covers 56,000 square meters on a ridge north of the Hara Interchange on the Chūō Expressway. The area surrounding Mount Yatsugatake has an extremely dense concentration of Jōmon period settlement sites. To the immediate north of this site is the Togariishi ruins and to the south is the Idojiri ruins, both of which are major settlement sites from the same period. Until the discovery of the Sannai-Maruyama Site in Aomori Prefecture, this was the largest known Jōmon site in Japan. It was discovered during construction work on the Chūō Expressway and an archaeological excavation was performed in 1975. As the route of the expressway would have destroyed the site, the area was backfilled after the survey was completed, and the expressway was built on top of the backfill layer, with the aim of preserving the ruins underneath.

The site occupies as hill with a maximum width of 200 meters, between the Aku and Ohaya Rivers. It appears to have been continuously occupied for several thousand years from the early to the end of the Jōmon period. The foundations of 30 round pit dwellings and eight square pillar dwellings (thought to be elevated floor granaries) from the early Jōmon period (4000–2500 BCE) and 20 pit dwellings and several graves from the middle Jōmon period (2500–1500 BCE) were excavated. The site is highly significant in that it clearly shows the transition from early to middle Jōmon culture over three distinct periods. In the earliest period (the "Sekiyama" cultural phase), the buildings were arranged around an oval central plaza measuring 30 by 70 meters. In the middle phase (the Kurohama" cultural phase), the buildings were in a horseshoe configuration around the central plaza, and were built directly on the ground. In the later phase (the "Moriso" cultural phase; 1500–300 BCE), a stone circle was constructed on the outer circumference of the central plaza and the residential area was outside this stone circle.

The stone circle was donut-shaped, with a major diameter of 120 meters and a minor diameter of 90 meters, and contained an estimated 200,000 fist-sized river rocks. In the center was a stone pillar with a height of 1.34 meters, made of 24 large and small andesite stones and two flat stones paired to the northeast. In addition, there were eight smaller stone circles with a radius of around one meter, consisting of groups of about ten stones each. The center complex was surrounded by an estimated 700 tombs.

Some of the artifacts recovered from the site, including Jōmon pottery and stone tools, are on display at the Nagano Prefectural History Museum in the city of Chino and at the Yatsugatake Museum of Art (八ヶ岳美術館, Yatsugatake bijutsukan), located in the village of Hara. The site is about 20 minutes by car from Chino Station on the JR East Chūō Main Line.

== See also ==
- List of Historic Sites of Japan (Nagano)
