= Suzurannosato Station =

Railway station in Fujimi, Nagano Prefecture, Japan

CO54 Suzurannosato Station すずらんの里駅
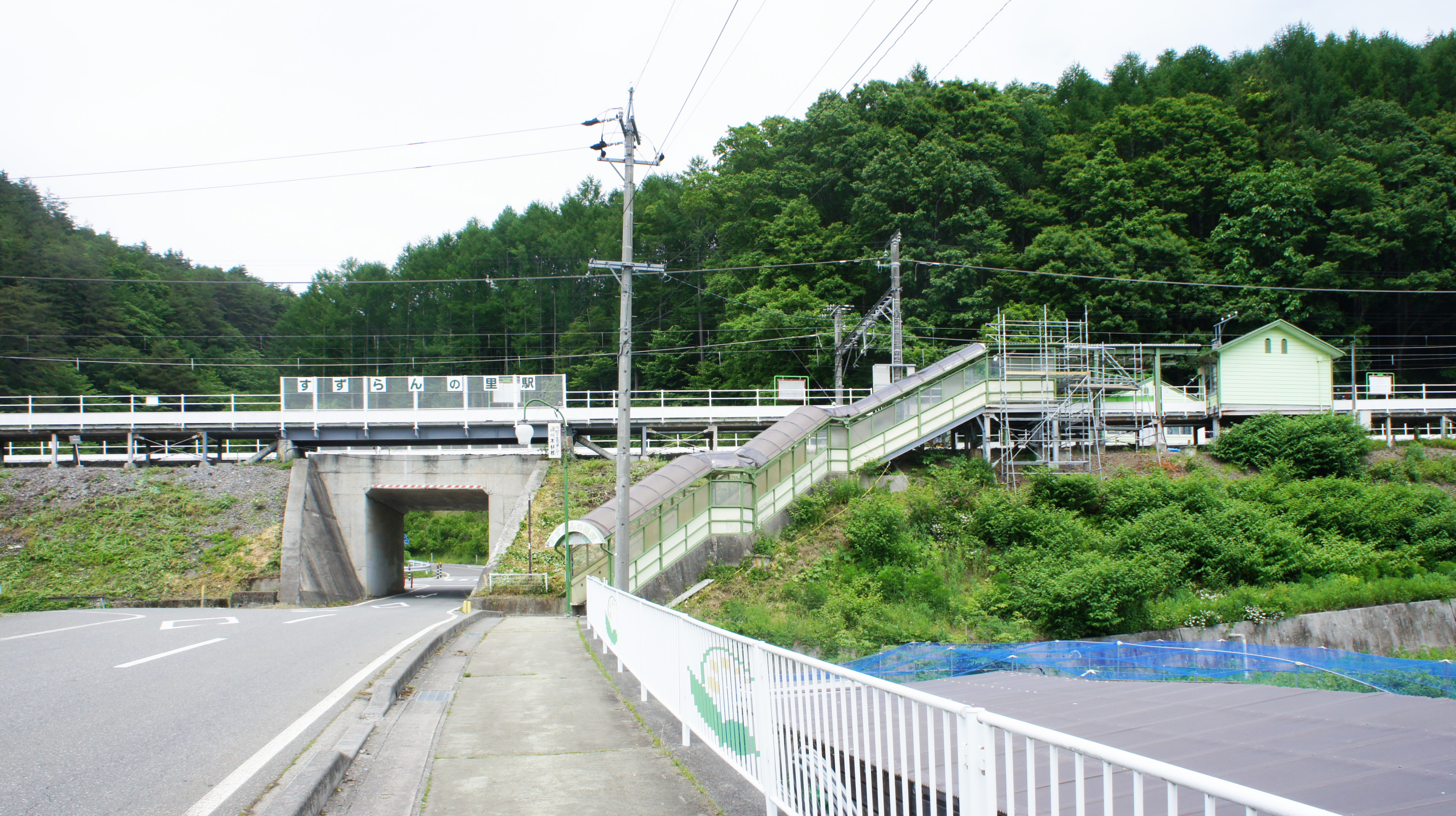
- Suzurannosato Station in June 2021

General information
- Location: Fujimi, Fujimi-cho, Suwa-gun. Nagano-ken 399-0211; Japan
- Coordinates: 35°55′49″N 138°12′43″E
- Elevation: 949.6 meters
- Operator: JR East
- Line: ■ Chūō Main Line
- Distance: 186.1 km from Tokyo
- Platforms: 2 side platforms
- Tracks: 2

Other information
- Status: Unstaffed
- Station code: CO54
- Website: Official website

History
- Opened: 1 April 1987

Passengers
- FY2011: 357

Services
Preceding station	JR East	Following station
Aoyagi CO55 towards Shiojiri	Chūō Main Line Local	Fujimi CO53 towards Tachikawa
Location
- Location within Nagano Prefecture Location within Japan

Suzurannosato Station (すずらんの里駅, Suzurannosato-eki) is a railway station in Sakai, in the town of Fujimi Town, Suwa District, Nagano Prefecture, Japan, operated by East Japan Railway Company (JR East).

== Lines ==
Suzurannosato Station is served by the Chūō Main Line and is 186.1 kilometers from the terminus of the line at Tokyo Station.

== Station layout ==
Suzurannosato Station has two unnumbered opposed side platforms built on an embankment. The platforms are connected by an underpass. The station is not attended.

=== Platforms ===
west	■ Chūō Main Line	for Kami-Suwa, Shiojiri and Matsumoto
east	■ Chūō Main Line	for Kobuchizawa, Kōfu and Tokyo

== History ==
The station opened on 31 October 1985. With the privatization of Japanese National Railways (JNR) on 1 April 1987, the station came under the control of JR East. Station numbering introduced on the line from February 2025, with the station being assigned number CO54.

== Surrounding area ==
- National Route 20

== See also ==
- List of railway stations in Japan
