= Fujimi Station =

Railway station in Fujimi, Nagano Prefecture, Japan

CO53 Fujimi Station 富士見駅
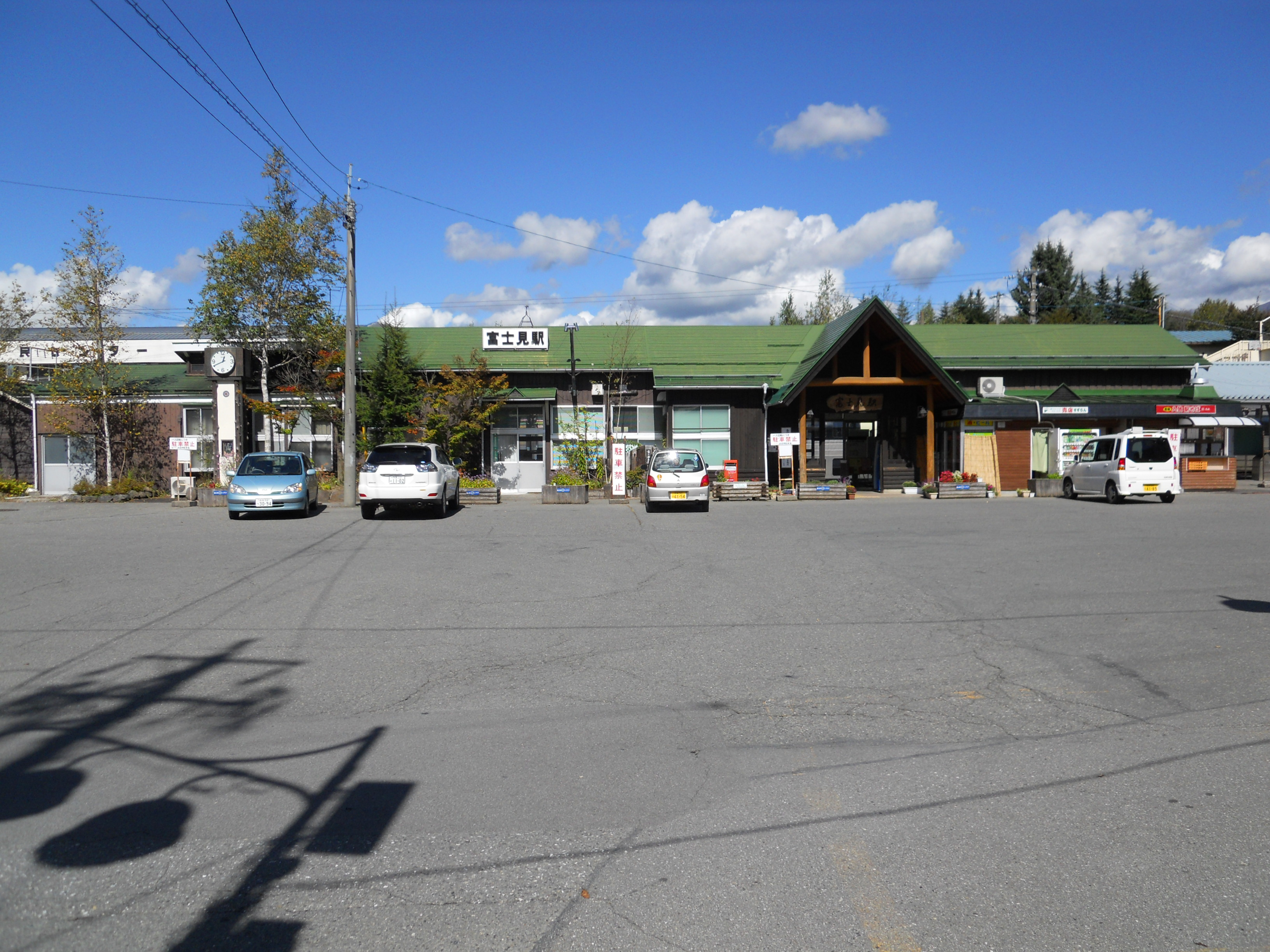
- Fujimi Station in October 2010

General information
- Location: 4654-796 Fujimi, Fujimi-cho, Suwa-gun. Nagano-ken; Japan
- Coordinates: 35.9119°N 138.2385°E
- Elevation: 955.2 meters
- Operator: JR East
- Line: ■ Chūō Main Line
- Distance: 182.9 km from Tokyo
- Platforms: 1 side + 1 island platforms
- Tracks: 3

Other information
- Status: Staffed (Midori no Madoguchi)
- Station code: CO53
- Website: Official website

History
- Opened: 21 December 1904; 121 years ago

Passengers
- FY2024: 1,722 (daily) ▲2.74%

Services
| Preceding station | JR East | Following station |
|---|---|---|
| Chino CO56 towards Hakuba | Azusa | Kobuchizawa CO51 towards Chiba or Tokyo |
| Suzurannosato CO54 towards Shiojiri | Chūō Main Line Local | Shinano-Sakai CO52 towards Tachikawa |
Location
- Location within Nagano Prefecture Location within Japan

Fujimi Station (富士見駅, Fujimi-eki) is a railway station on the Chūō Main Line in the town of Fujimi, Suwa District, Nagano Prefecture, Japan, operated by East Japan Railway Company (JR East).

== Lines ==
Fujimi Station is served by the Chūō Main Line and is 182.9 kilometers from the terminus of the line at Tokyo Station.

== Station layout ==
Fujimi Station hasten ground-level side platform and one island platform connected by a footbridge. The station has a Midori no Madoguchi staffed ticket office. The Midori no Madoguchi staffed ticket office is open from 6:00 a.m.-7:00 p.m. and closed at 10:10 a.m.-10:35 a.m. / 11:10 a.m.-11:30 a.m. / 12:25 p.m.-1:25 p.m. / 2:20 p.m. - 2:35 p.m. / 4:00 p.m. - 4:15 p.m., during which time there will be no staff on duty.

=== Platforms ===
| 1 | ■ Chūō Main Line | for Shiojiri and Matsumoto |
| 2 | ■ Chūō Main Line | for starting trains |
| 3 | ■ Chūō Main Line | for Kōfu and Shinjuku |

== History ==
The station opened on 21 December 1904. With the privatization of Japanese National Railways (JNR) on 1 April 1987, the station came under the control of JR East. Station numbering introduced on the line from February 2025, with the station being assigned number CO53.

== Passenger statistics ==
In fiscal 2015, the station was used by an average of 924 passengers daily (boarding passengers only).

== Surrounding area ==
- National Route 20
- Fujimi Town Hall
- Fujimi High School

== See also ==
- List of railway stations in Japan
