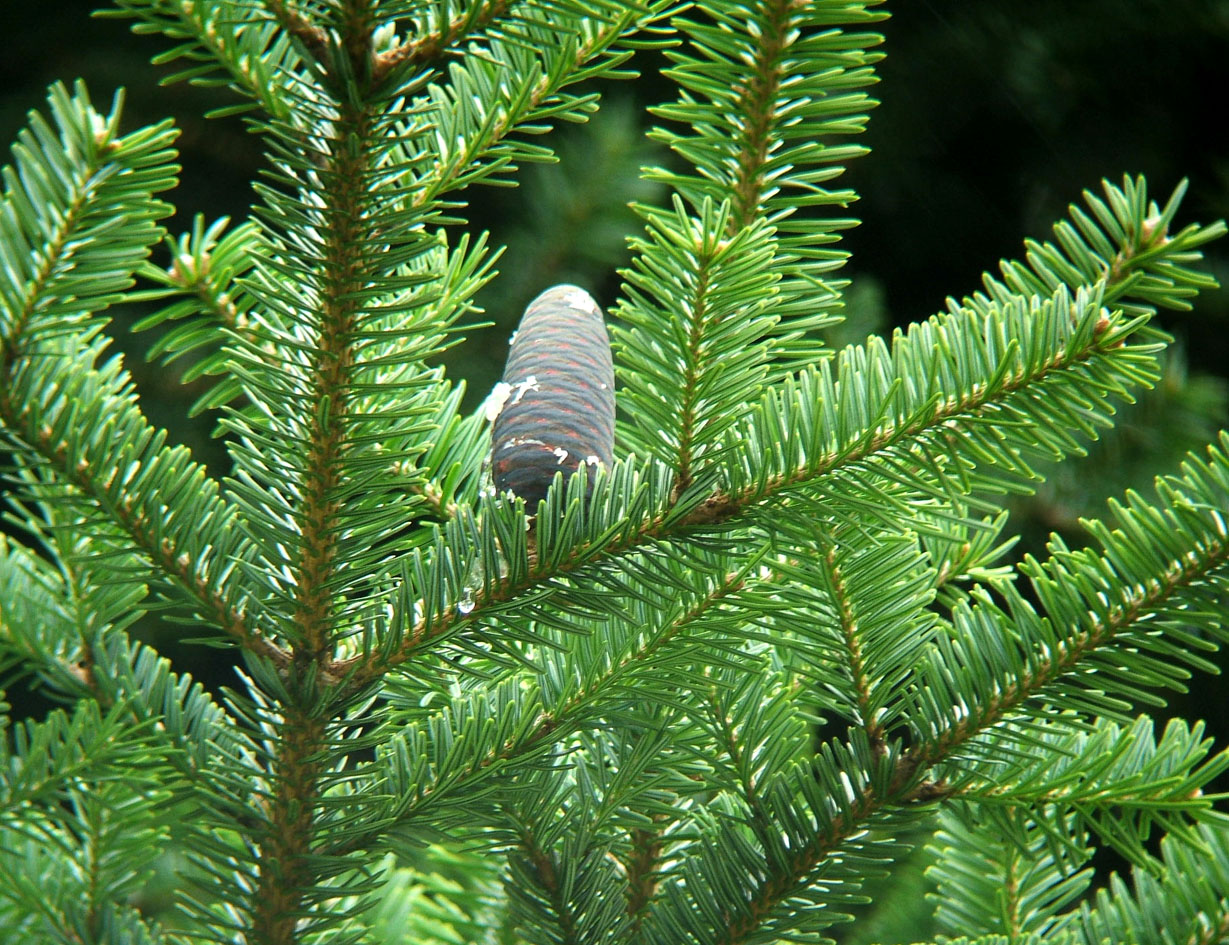
- Foliage and cone

Conservation status
- Near Threatened (IUCN 3.1)

Scientific classification
- Kingdom: Plantae
- Clade: Tracheophytes
- Clade: Gymnospermae
- Division: Pinophyta
- Class: Pinopsida
- Order: Pinales
- Family: Pinaceae
- Genus: Abies
- Species: A. homolepis

Binomial name
- Abies homolepis Siebold & Zucc.

= Abies homolepis =

Nikko fir

Species of fir tree

Abies homolepis, also known as the Nikko fir or urajiro momi in Japanese, is a species of fir native to the mountains of Pacific-side central and southern Honshū and Shikoku, Japan. It grows at altitudes of 700–2,200 m, often in temperate rain forest with high rainfall and cool, humid summers, and heavy winter snowfall.

== Description ==
It is a medium-sized to large evergreen coniferous tree growing to 30–40 m tall with a trunk diameter of up to 1.5 m. The leaves are needle-like, flattened, 1.5–3.5 cm long and 2–3 mm wide by 0.5 mm thick, glossy green above, and with two white bands of stomata below, and rounded or slightly notched at the tip. The leaf arrangement is spiral on the shoot, but with each leaf variably twisted at the base so they lie partially flattened to either side of and above the shoot, with few below the shoot. The shoots are yellow-buff, glabrous, and often conspicuously grooved. The cones are 6–12 cm long and 3–4 cm broad, purple-blue before maturity; the scale bracts are short, and hidden in the closed cone. The winged seeds are released when the cones disintegrate at maturity about 6–7 months after pollination.

== Ecology ==
Abies homolepsis is one of the five fir species of Japan, four of which are found on Honshu and surrounding islands. It is most closely related to Abies firma, from which it diverged in the late Pliocene. A. homolepsis, A. firma, and Abies veitchii are separately distributed by geography and elevation, although hybrids of the three have been found throughout Japan where they overlap, particularly in marginal areas.

== Uses ==
The wood of Nikko fir is used for general structural timber, but it is not a popular timber tree because of its limited range and high elevation. Outside Japan, it is grown as an ornamental tree in northern Europe and North America.

It is also a popular forest tree since it is resistant to air pollution.
