= Shinano-Sakai Station =

Railway station in Fujimi, Nagano Prefecture, Japan

CO52 Shinano-Sakai Station 信濃境駅
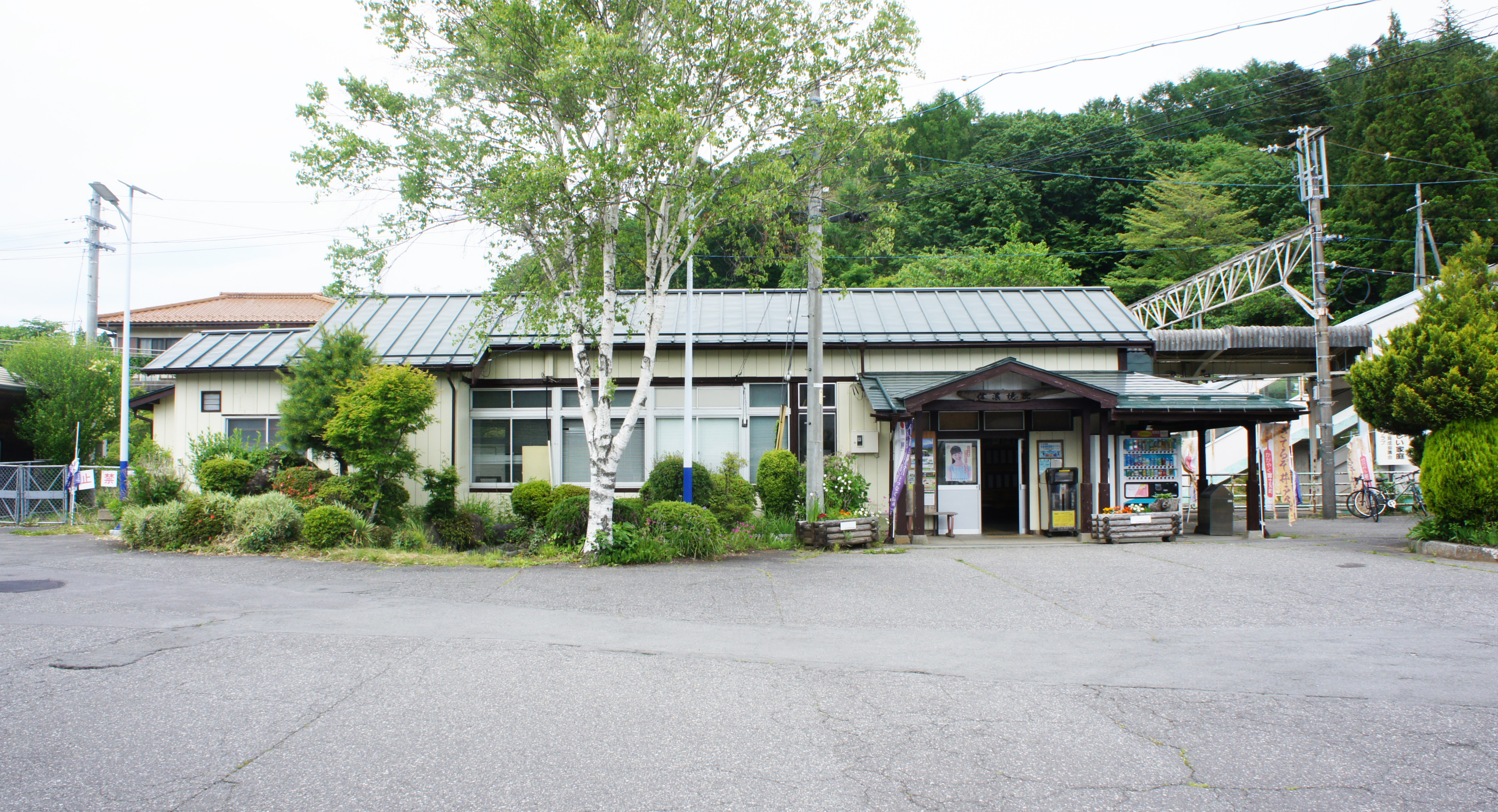
- Shinano-Sakai Station in June 2021

General information
- Location: Sakai, Fujimi-cho, Suwa-gun. Nagano-ken 399-0101; Japan
- Coordinates: 35.8850°N 138.2755°E
- Elevation: 921.4 meters
- Operator: JR East
- Line: ■ Chūō Main Line
- Distance: 178.2 km from Tokyo
- Platforms: 2 side platforms
- Tracks: 2

Other information
- Status: Unstaffed
- Station code: CO52
- Website: Official website

History
- Opened: 1 November 1928

Passengers
- FY2015: 166 daily

Services
Preceding station	JR East	Following station
Fujimi CO53 towards Shiojiri	Chūō Main Line Local	Kobuchizawa CO51 towards Tachikawa
Location
- Location within Nagano Prefecture Location within Japan

Shinano-Sakai Station (信濃境駅, Shinano-Sakai-eki) is a railway station in Sakai, in the town of Fujimi, Suwa District, Nagano Prefecture, Japan, operated by East Japan Railway Company (JR East).

== Lines ==
Shinano-Sakai Station is served by the Chūō Main Line and is 178.2 kilometers from the terminus of the line at Tokyo Station.

== Station layout ==
Shinano-Sakai Station has two unnumbered opposed side platforms connected by a footbridge. The station is unattended.

=== Platforms ===
station side	■ Chūō Main Line	for Kami-Suwa, Shiojiri and Matsumoto
opp side	■ Chūō Main Line	for Kobuchizawa, Kōfu and Tokyo

== History ==
The station opened on 1 November 1928. With the privatization of Japanese National Railways (JNR) on 1 April 1987, the station came under the control of JR East. Station numbering introduced on the line from February 2025, with the station being assigned number CO52.

== Passenger statistics ==
In fiscal 2015, the station was used by an average of 166 passengers daily (boarding passengers only).

== Surrounding area ==
- National Route 20
- Sakai Post Office
- Fujimi Minami Middle School

== See also ==
- List of railway stations in Japan
