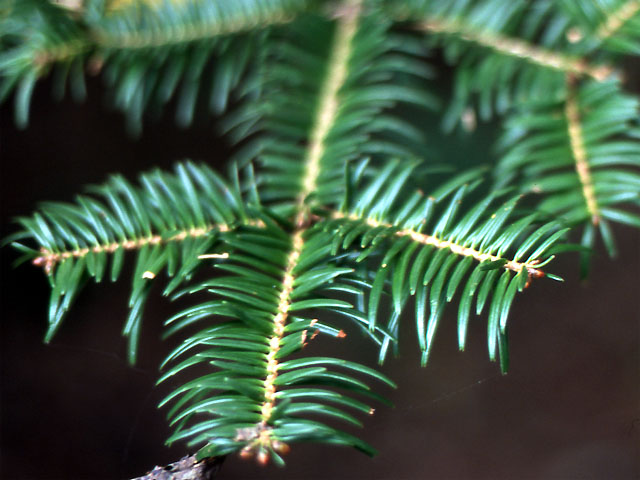
- Foliage

Conservation status
- Least Concern (IUCN 3.1)

Scientific classification
- Kingdom: Plantae
- Clade: Tracheophytes
- Clade: Gymnospermae
- Division: Pinophyta
- Class: Pinopsida
- Order: Pinales
- Family: Pinaceae
- Genus: Abies
- Species: A. firma

Binomial name
- Abies firma Siebold & Zucc.

= Abies firma =

Species of conifer

Abies firma, the momi fir, is a species of fir native to central and southern Japan, growing at low to moderate altitudes of 50–1200 m.

Abies firma is a medium-sized to large evergreen coniferous tree growing to 50 metres (160 ft) tall and 2 metres (6 ft 7 in) in trunk diameter, with a broad conical crown of straight branches rising at an angle of about 20° above horizontal. The bark is scaly grey-brown, with resin blisters on young trees. The shoots are grooved, buff to grey-brown, glabrous or finely pubescent. The leaves ("needles") are flattened, 2–5 centimetres (0.79–1.97 in) long and 2–4 millimetres (0.079–0.157 in) broad, spread at nearly right angles from the shoot; the apex is sharp, bifid (double-pointed) on the leaves of young trees, single-pointed on mature trees. They are bright green above, and greyish-green below with two broad stomatal bands. The cones are 7–15 centimetres (2.8–5.9 in) long by 3–5 centimetres (1.2–2.0 in) wide, green maturing yellow-brown, tapering to a 2–3 centimetres (0.79–1.18 in) broad bluntly rounded apex. The scale bracts are exserted 3–6 millimetres (0.12–0.24 in), triangular. The seeds are 7–9 millimetres (0.28–0.35 in) long with a wedge-shaped wing 1.5 centimetres (0.59 in) long, are released after the cones disintegrate at maturity in October.

Along with Abies homolepis, Abies firma is one of the two fir species that compose the majority of Japanese temperate forest zones. These two species hybridize at the point where their elevation ranges overlap and give rise to the hybrid Abies umbellata, also known as A. x umbellata.

Regrowth of Abies firma forests is threatened by overbrowsing from Sika deer.

Momi fir is sometimes, but not commonly, used as an ornamental tree, particularly in warm temperate regions with hot, humid summers such as the southeastern United States. It is also used as a grafting understock for fir cultivars in these areas.
