= Southern Yatsugatake Volcanic Group =

Volcanic group on the island of Honshu, Japan

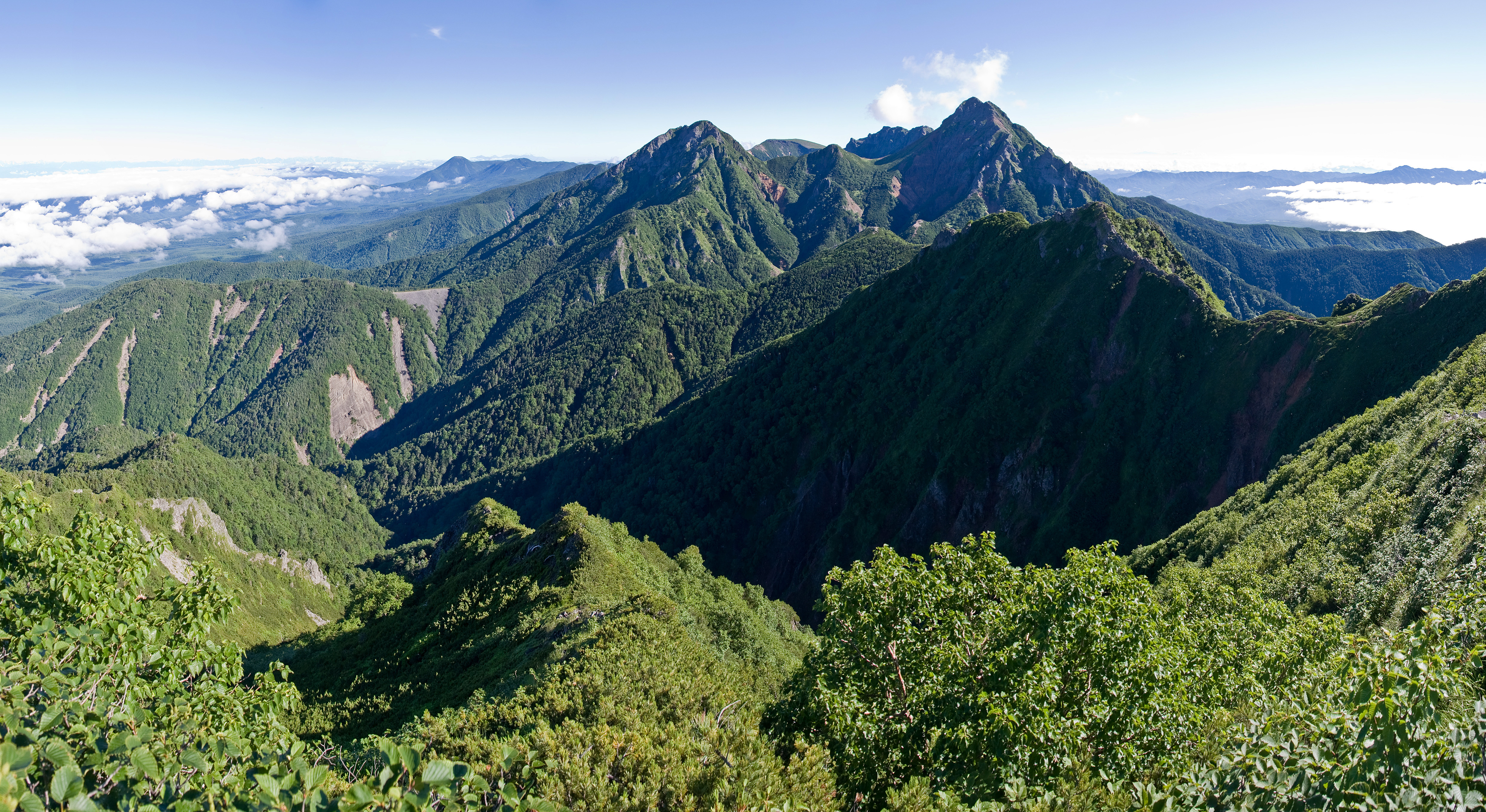
- Yatsugatake from Mount Gongen (August 2010)

Highest point
- Peak: Mount Aka
- Elevation: 2,899 m (9,511 ft)
- Coordinates: 35°58′15″N 138°22′12″E

Naming
- Etymology: Southern mountains with eight peaks
- Native name: 南八ヶ岳 (Japanese); Minami-Yatsugatake (Japanese)

Geography
- Location within Japan
- Country: Japan
- Prefectures: Nagano Prefecture and Yamanashi Prefecture
- Region: Chūbu
- Districts: Minamisaku and Suwa
- Municipalities: Hara, Fujimi, Chino, Hokuto and Minamimaki
- Parent range: Yatsugatake Mountains
- Borders on: Northern Yatsugatake Volcanic Group
- Biome: Alpine climate

Geology
- Rock age: Quaternary
- Mountain type: Stratovolcanoes
- Volcanic arc: Northeastern Japan Arc

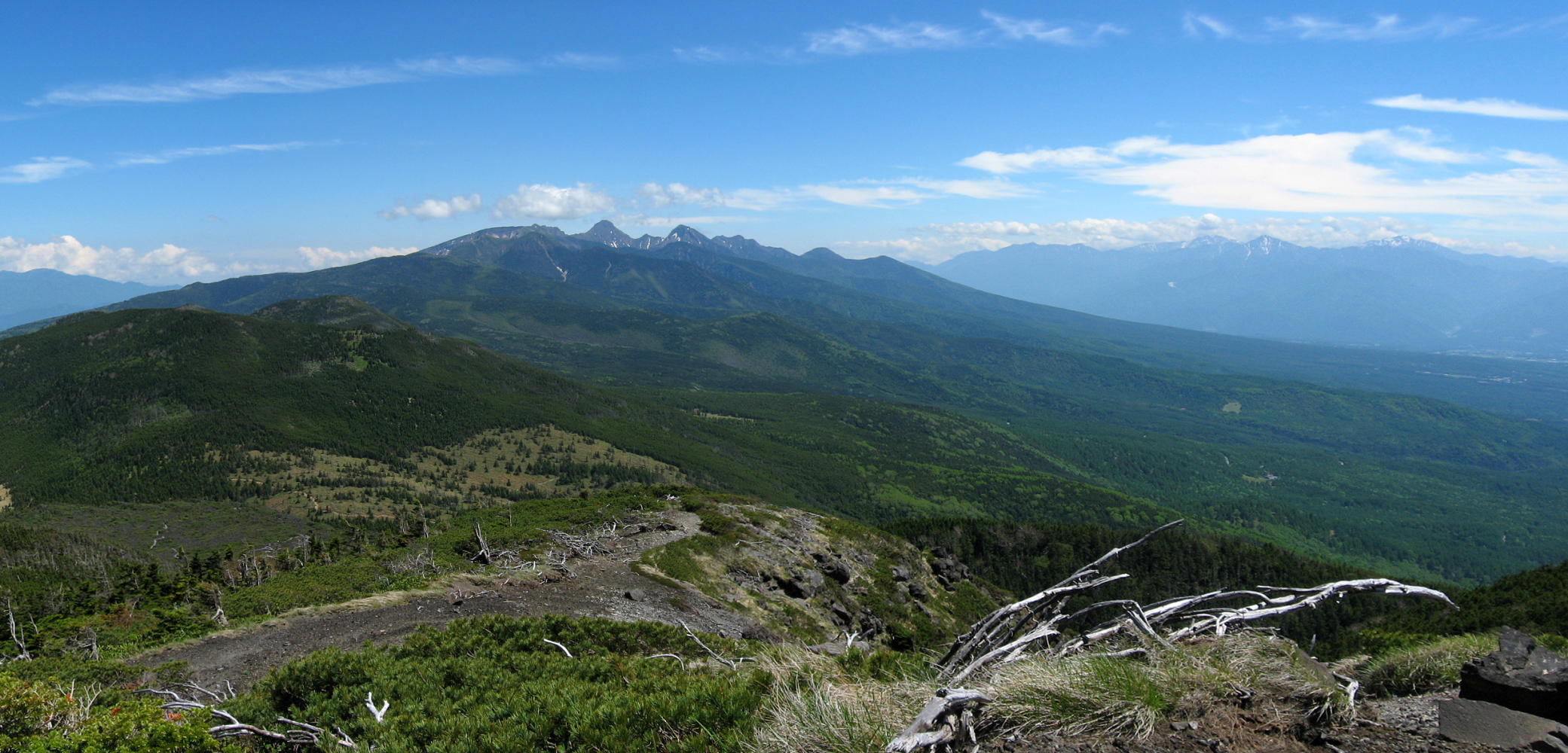
Yatsugatake from Mt. Kitayoko (June 2007)

Southern Yatsugatake Volcanic Group (南八ヶ岳, Minami-Yatsugatake), also known as just Yatsugatake, is a volcanic group of inactive volcanoes located on the border of Nagano Prefecture and Yamanashi Prefecture on Honshū in Japan.

== Description ==
The Southern Yatsugatake Volcanic Group is part of the Yatsugatake Mountains. The southern group is defined as the mountains south of the Natsuzawa Pass. The highest peak of the mountains is Mount Aka and the elevation is 2,899 metres.

The southern Yatugatake mountains are steep and have alpine characteristics. The mountains of the Northern Yatsugatake Volcanic Group are gentler and lower. Mount Tateshina is also part of the Northern Yatsugatake mountains, but is listed separately.

This volcanic group is listed among the 100 famous mountains in Japan. There the mountains are listed as Yatsugatake.

These mountains are part of the Yatsugatake-Chūshin Kōgen Quasi-National Park.

== Geology ==
The volcanoes are stratovolcanoes that are 1 million to 200,000 years old. The rock is mainly basalt and andesite.

== Climate ==
Climate data for Nobeyama Station, 1991–2020 normals, extremes 1978–present
Month	Jan	Feb	Mar	Apr	May	Jun	Jul	Aug	Sep	Oct	Nov	Dec	Year
Record high °C (°F)	11.9 (53.4)	15.6 (60.1)	20.1 (68.2)	24.9 (76.8)	26.5 (79.7)	28.6 (83.5)	30.7 (87.3)	31.0 (87.8)	29.1 (84.4)	24.9 (76.8)	19.7 (67.5)	16.9 (62.4)	31.0 (87.8)
Mean daily maximum °C (°F)	0.1 (32.2)	1.1 (34.0)	5.4 (41.7)	12.1 (53.8)	17.2 (63.0)	19.9 (67.8)	23.7 (74.7)	24.7 (76.5)	20.3 (68.5)	14.7 (58.5)	9.6 (49.3)	3.5 (38.3)	12.7 (54.9)
Daily mean °C (°F)	−5.3 (22.5)	−4.5 (23.9)	−0.3 (31.5)	5.8 (42.4)	11.0 (51.8)	14.8 (58.6)	18.9 (66.0)	19.5 (67.1)	15.5 (59.9)	9.3 (48.7)	3.8 (38.8)	−1.9 (28.6)	7.2 (45.0)
Mean daily minimum °C (°F)	−12.2 (10.0)	−11.4 (11.5)	−6.4 (20.5)	−0.6 (30.9)	4.9 (40.8)	10.2 (50.4)	15.0 (59.0)	15.5 (59.9)	11.4 (52.5)	4.4 (39.9)	−1.8 (28.8)	−7.9 (17.8)	1.8 (35.2)
Record low °C (°F)	−25.1 (−13.2)	−26.0 (−14.8)	−25.3 (−13.5)	−18.7 (−1.7)	−6.6 (20.1)	−1.4 (29.5)	4.8 (40.6)	4.2 (39.6)	−2.2 (28.0)	−8.9 (16.0)	−14.1 (6.6)	−23.1 (−9.6)	−26.0 (−14.8)
Average precipitation mm (inches)	46.6 (1.83)	49.8 (1.96)	93.4 (3.68)	100.6 (3.96)	124.9 (4.92)	172.6 (6.80)	205.6 (8.09)	166.8 (6.57)	204.1 (8.04)	164.6 (6.48)	62.4 (2.46)	41.0 (1.61)	1,432.4 (56.39)
Average precipitation days (≥ 1.0 mm)	6.1	6.1	9.7	9.8	10.9	13.7	15.1	13.0	11.9	10.0	7.0	5.8	119.4
Mean monthly sunshine hours	175.7	167.1	179.8	188.3	186.0	127.7	142.2	160.1	124.1	140.2	167.9	175.5	1,933.7
Source 1: JMA
Source 2: JMA

== List of peaks ==
The following major peaks make up part of the Southern Yatsugatake Volcanic Group and are listed by height:

Name	Height
Mount Aka (赤岳, Aka-dake)	2,899.2 metres (9,511.8 ft)
Mount Yoko (横岳, Yoko-dake)	2,829 metres (9,281 ft)
Mount Amida (阿弥陀岳, Amida-dake)	2,805 metres (9,203 ft)
Mount Iō (硫黄岳, Iō-dake)	2,760 metres (9,060 ft)
Mount Gongen (権現岳, Gongen-dake)	2,715 metres (8,907 ft)
Mount Amigasa (編笠山, Amigasa-yama)	2,523.7 metres (8,279.9 ft)
Mount Nishi (西岳, Nishi-dake)	2,398 metres (7,867 ft)

From the south, to Natuzawa Pass, beyond which the Northern Yatsugatake Mountains begin, the peaks are:

- Mt. Amigasayama (2,524 m)
- Mt. Nishidake (2,398 m)
- Mt. Mitsugashira (2,580 m)
- Mt. Gongendake (2,715 m)
- Mt. Aka (2,899 m)
- Mt. Nakadake (2,700 m)
- Mt. Amidadake (2,805 m)
- Mt. Yoko (2,829 m)
- Mt. Iōdake (2,760 m)
- Mt. Akaiwanoatama (2,656 m)
- Mt. Minenomatsume (2,567 m)
- Natsuzawa Pass (2,423 m)

From Natsuzawa Pass, it is possible to descend to Sakuradaira, via O-ren Hut and Natsuzawa Kosen, or directly to Honzawa Onsen, or continue through the Northern Yatsugatake Mountains.

== Gallery ==
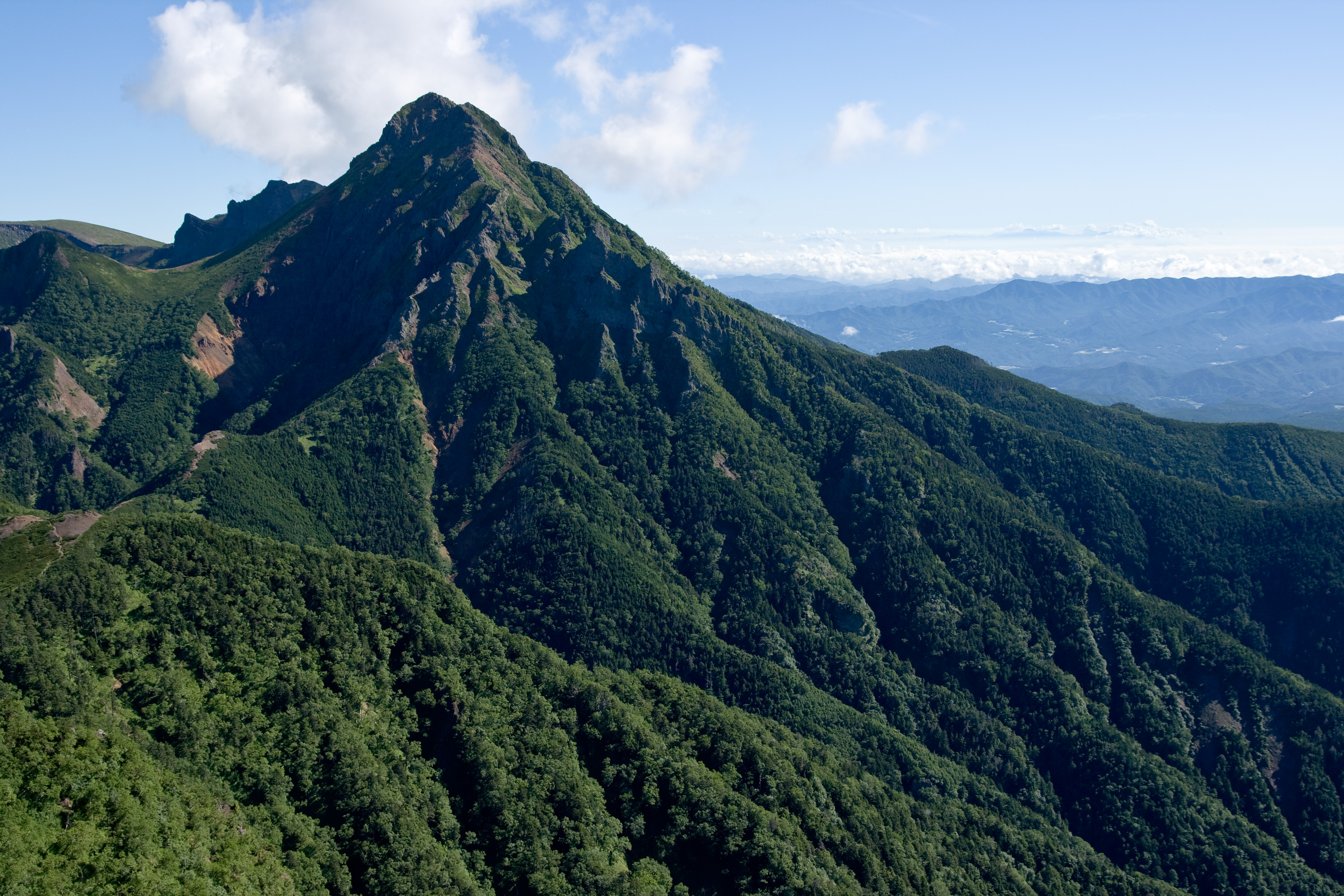
Mount Aka, the highest peak of the Yatsugatake mountains

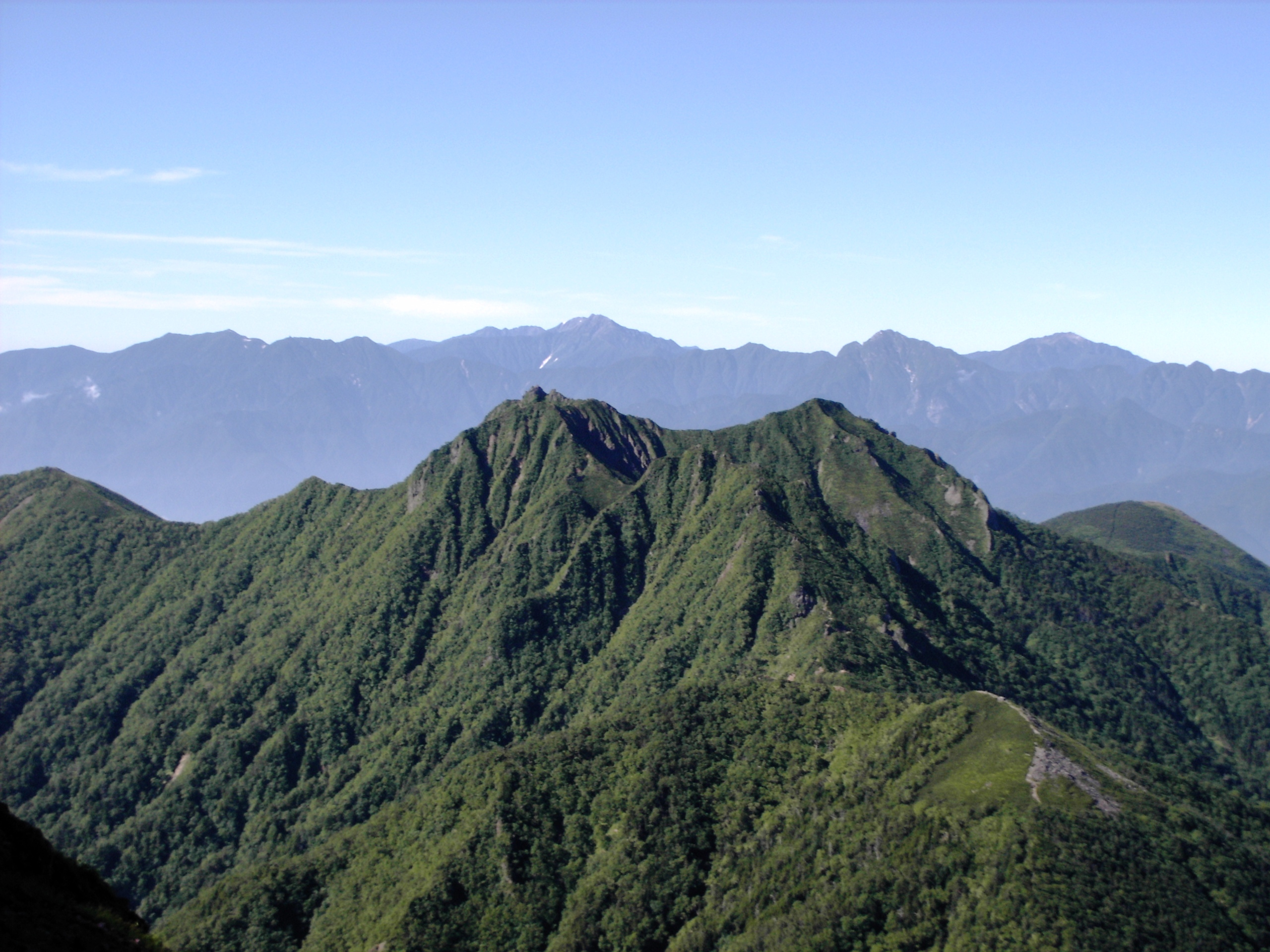
Mount Gongen, from Mount Aka

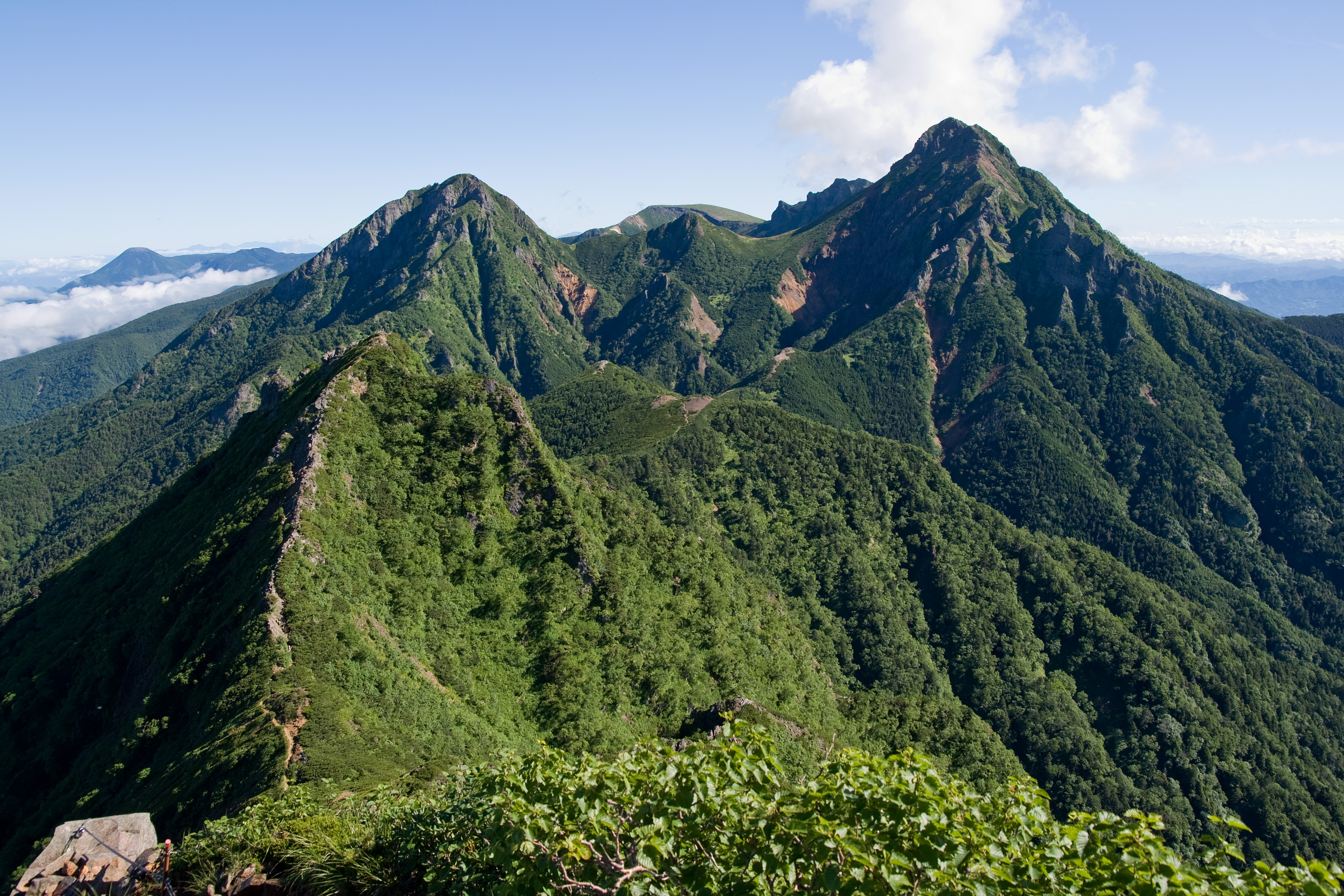
Mount Amida, Mount Iō, Mount Yoko and Mount Aka from Mount Gongen

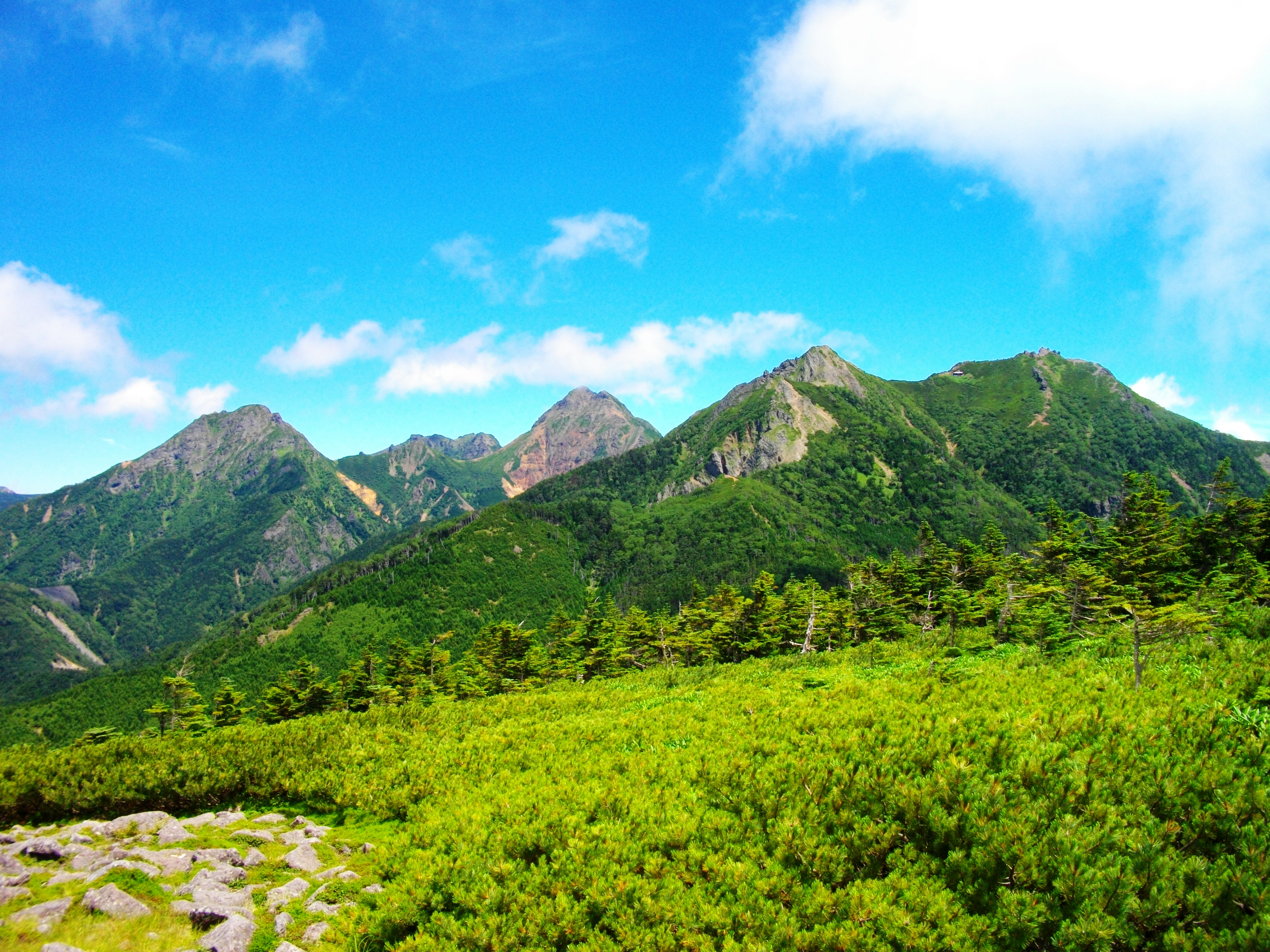
Mount Amida, Mount Iō, Mount Yoko, Mount Aka and Mount Gongen from Mount Amigasa

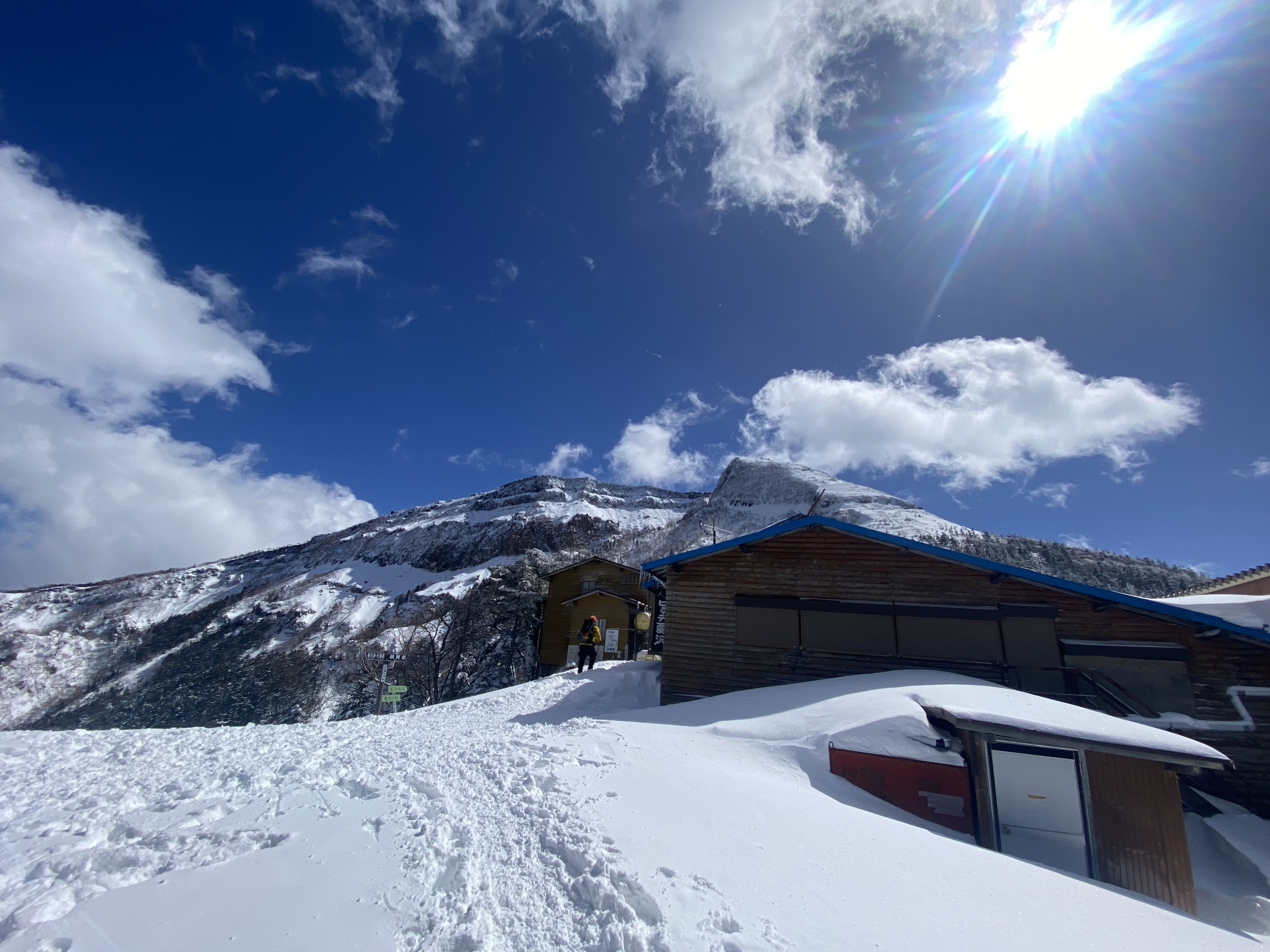
Mt Iō taken from Natsuzawa Pass in March 2024.jpg

== See also ==
- List of mountains in Japan
- List of volcanoes in Japan

== See also ==
- Yatsugatake-Chūshin Kōgen Quasi-National Park
- Yatsugatake Mountains - Northern Yatsugatake Volcanic Group
- List of mountains in Japan
