= Hara, Nagano =

Hara 原村
- Village
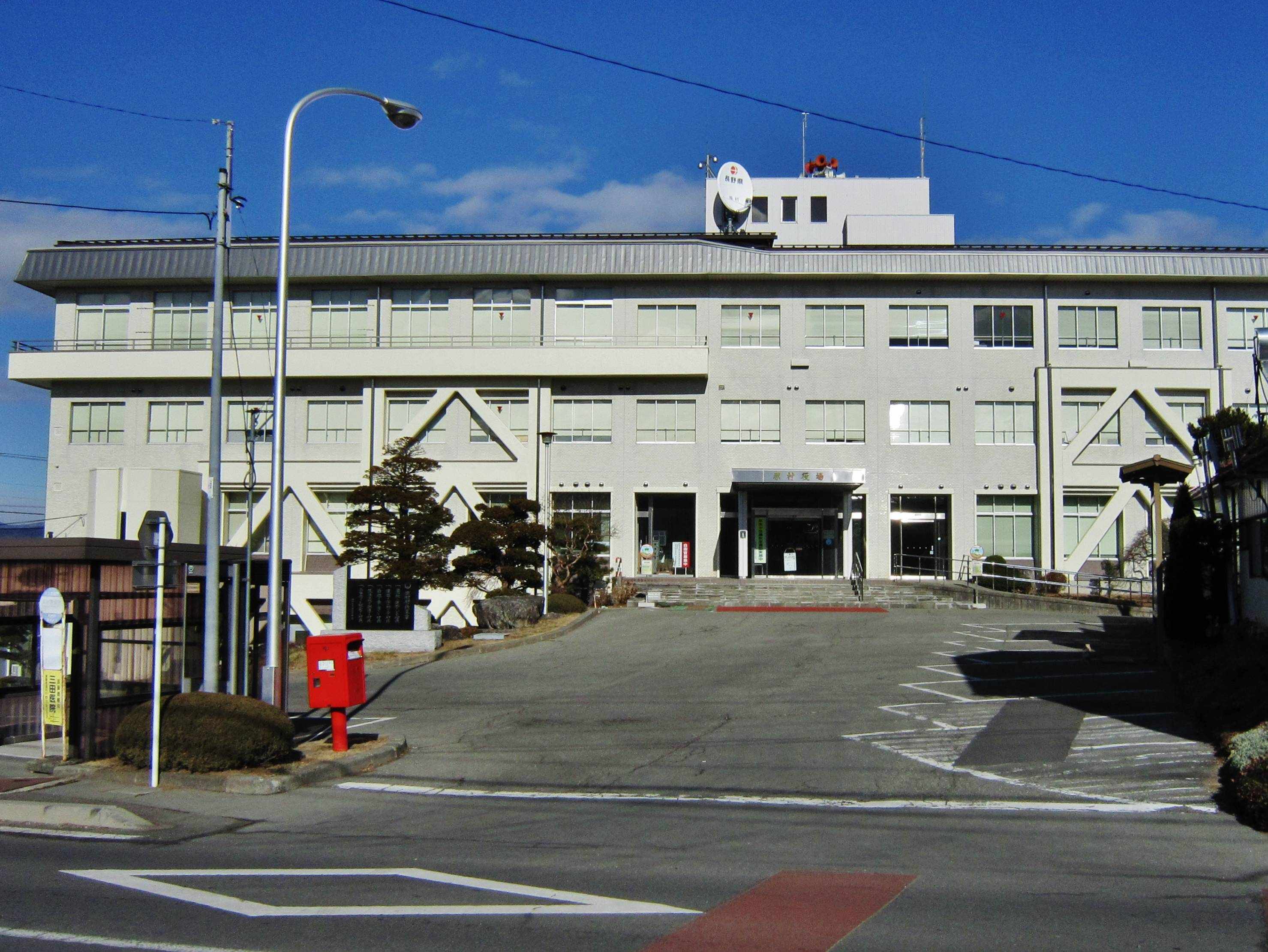
- Hara Village Hall

- Flag Seal

- Location of Hara in Nagano Prefecture

- Coordinates: 35°57′51.8″N 138°13′2.6″E
- Country: Japan
- Region: Chūbu (Kōshin'etsu)
- Prefecture: Nagano
- District: Suwa

Area
  - Total: 43.26 km^{2} (16.70 sq mi)

Population (February 2019)
  - Total: 7,661
  - Density: 177.1/km^{2} (458.7/sq mi)
- Time zone: UTC+9 (Japan Standard Time)
- Phone number: 0266-79-2100
- Address: 6549-1 Hara-mura, Suwa-gun, Nagano-ken 391-0100
- Climate: Dfa
- Website: Official website

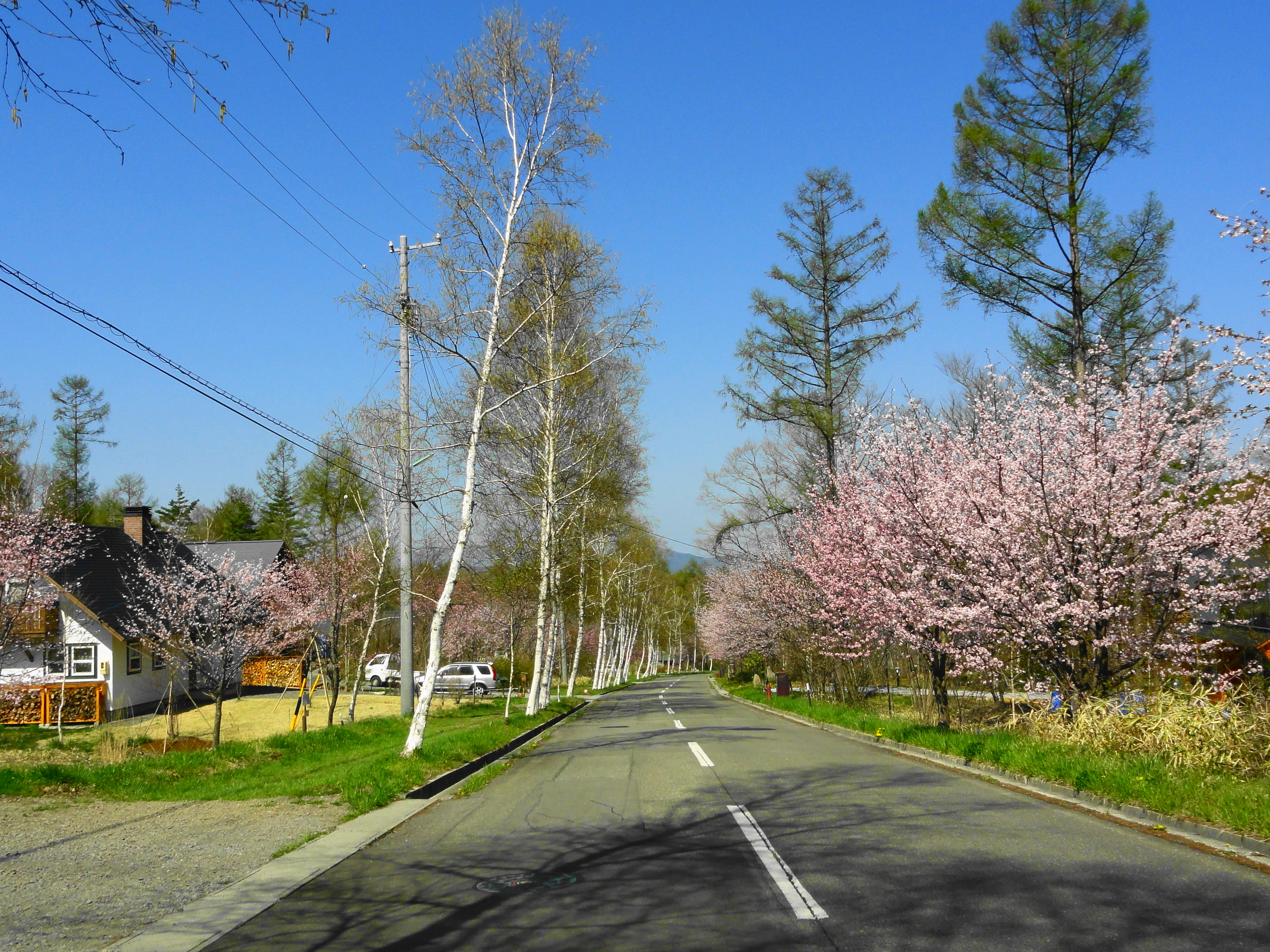
Hara Village in spring

Hara (原村, Hara-mura) is a village located in Nagano Prefecture, Japan. As of 1 February 2019, the village had an estimated population of 7,661 in 2445 households, and a population density of 174 persons per km^{2}. The total area of the village is 43.26 square kilometres (16.70 sq mi).

== Geography ==
Hara is located in eastern Nagano Prefecture. The village is located in a mountainous area, and includes Mount Yatsugatake partly within its borders.

=== Surrounding municipalities ===
- Nagano Prefecture
  - Chino
  - Fujimi

== Climate ==
The village has a humid continental climate characterized by warm and humid summers, and cold winters with heavy snowfall (Köppen climate classification Dfa). The average annual temperature in Hara is 9.5 °C (49.1 °F). The average annual rainfall is 1,271.5 mm (50.06 in) with September as the wettest month. The temperatures are highest on average in August, at around 22.0 °C (71.6 °F), and lowest in January, at around −3.0 °C (26.6 °F).

Climate data for Haramura, Hara (1991–2020 normals, extremes 1978–present)
Month	Jan	Feb	Mar	Apr	May	Jun	Jul	Aug	Sep	Oct	Nov	Dec	Year
Record high °C (°F)	14.3 (57.7)	17.1 (62.8)	23.7 (74.7)	27.4 (81.3)	30.1 (86.2)	33.4 (92.1)	33.7 (92.7)	34.3 (93.7)	31.9 (89.4)	26.8 (80.2)	22.8 (73.0)	18.3 (64.9)	34.3 (93.7)
Mean daily maximum °C (°F)	2.4 (36.3)	3.6 (38.5)	8.3 (46.9)	15.1 (59.2)	20.2 (68.4)	23.1 (73.6)	26.8 (80.2)	28.1 (82.6)	23.4 (74.1)	17.4 (63.3)	11.7 (53.1)	5.6 (42.1)	15.5 (59.9)
Daily mean °C (°F)	−3.0 (26.6)	−2.2 (28.0)	1.9 (35.4)	8.0 (46.4)	13.5 (56.3)	17.3 (63.1)	21.3 (70.3)	22.0 (71.6)	17.7 (63.9)	11.5 (52.7)	5.5 (41.9)	0.0 (32.0)	9.5 (49.1)
Mean daily minimum °C (°F)	−8.1 (17.4)	−7.8 (18.0)	−3.8 (25.2)	1.7 (35.1)	7.5 (45.5)	12.7 (54.9)	17.1 (62.8)	17.6 (63.7)	13.5 (56.3)	6.8 (44.2)	0.3 (32.5)	−4.9 (23.2)	4.4 (39.9)
Record low °C (°F)	−16.9 (1.6)	−19.7 (−3.5)	−14.5 (5.9)	−8.7 (16.3)	−2.5 (27.5)	2.4 (36.3)	9.5 (49.1)	9.4 (48.9)	1.2 (34.2)	−4.7 (23.5)	−10.5 (13.1)	−15.1 (4.8)	−19.7 (−3.5)
Average precipitation mm (inches)	46.6 (1.83)	57.5 (2.26)	100.3 (3.95)	100.4 (3.95)	110.6 (4.35)	151.1 (5.95)	167.9 (6.61)	112.9 (4.44)	168.7 (6.64)	143.6 (5.65)	68.9 (2.71)	43.1 (1.70)	1,271.5 (50.06)
Average precipitation days (≥ 1.0 mm)	6.2	6.1	9.7	9.7	10.3	12.7	13.7	10.0	10.7	9.3	7.4	6.1	111.9
Mean monthly sunshine hours	185.2	183.3	190.2	197.2	211.9	164.9	172.9	204.5	156.3	165.0	177.7	179.1	2,188.4
Source: Japan Meteorological Agency (1991–2020 normals, extremes 1978–present)

== History ==
The area of present-day Hara was part of ancient Shinano Province. The present village of Hara was established on April 1, 1889 by the establishment of the modern municipalities system.

== Demographics ==
Per Japanese census data, the population of Hara has grown slightly over the past 50 years.

Historical population
Year	Pop.	±%
1940	5,913	—
1950	7,269	+22.9%
1960	6,521	−10.3%
1970	5,869	−10.0%
1980	6,125	+4.4%
1990	6,502	+6.2%
2000	7,207	+10.8%
2010	7,575	+5.1%
2020	7,680	+1.4%

== Economy ==
The economy of Hara is based on agriculture.

== Education ==
Hara has one public elementary school and one public junior high school operated by the village government. The village does not have a high school.

== Transportation ==
=== Railway ===
- The village has no passenger railway service.

=== Highway ===
- Chūō Expressway

== International relations ==
- – Pukekohe, New Zealand, sister city since May 2, 1974

== Local attraction ==
- Akyū ruins, a National Historic Site
- Yatsugatake Museum of Art

== Notable people from Hara ==
- Risa Itō, manga artist
