= Fujimi, Nagano =

Fujimi 富士見町
- Town
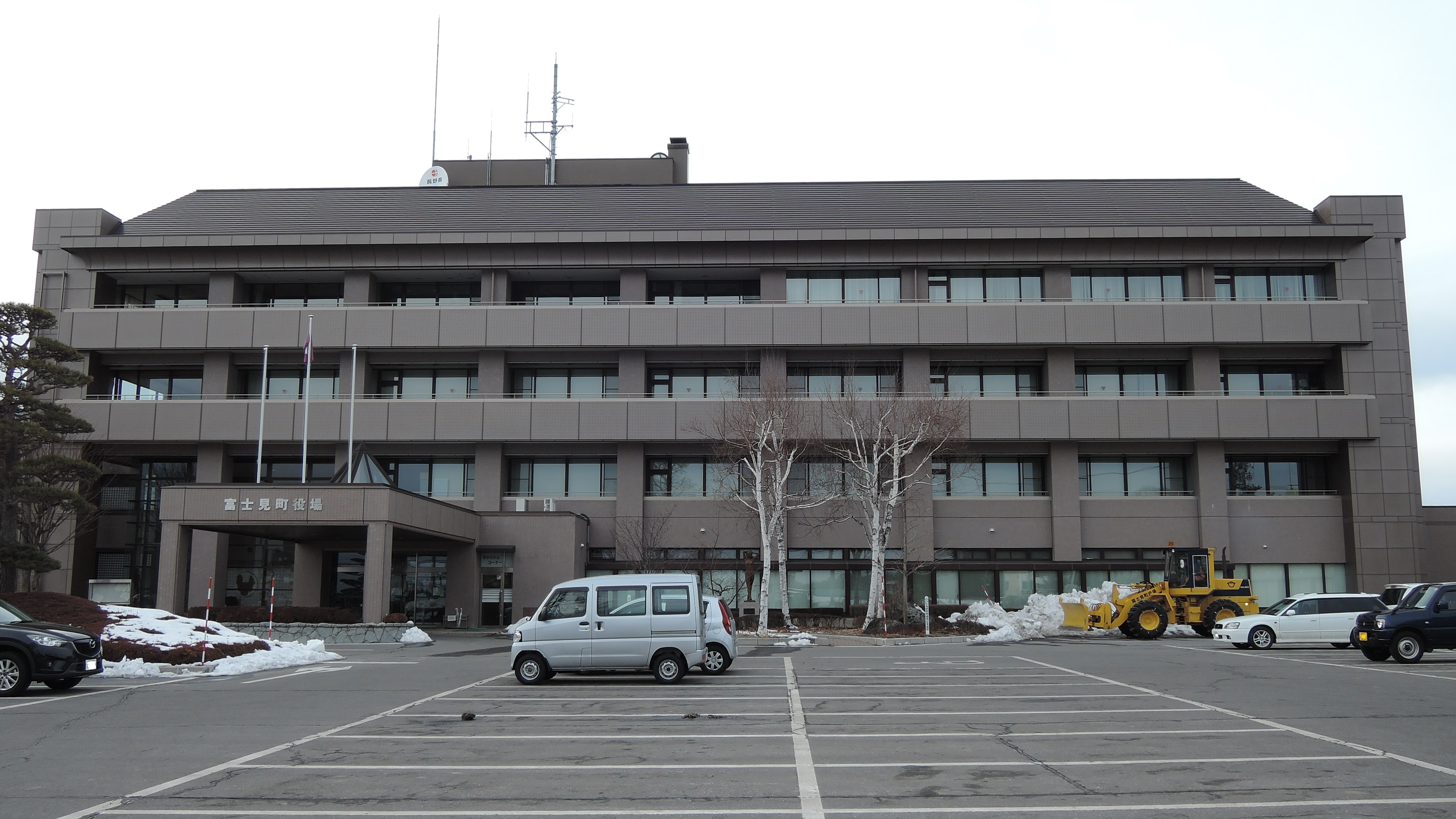
- Fujimi Town Hall

- Flag Seal

- Location of Fujimi in Nagano Prefecture

- Coordinates: 35°54′52.5″N 138°14′26.4″E
- Country: Japan
- Region: Chūbu (Kōshin'etsu)
- Prefecture: Nagano
- District: Suwa

Area
  - Total: 144.76 km^{2} (55.89 sq mi)

Population (April 2019)
  - Total: 14,485
  - Density: 100.06/km^{2} (259.16/sq mi)
- Time zone: UTC+9 (Japan Standard Time)
- Symbols
  - Tree: Betula platyphylla
  - Flower: Lily of the valley
- Phone number: 0266-62-2250
- Address: 107777 Ochiai, Fujimi-machi, Shimoina-gun, Nagano-ken 399-0292
- Website: Official website

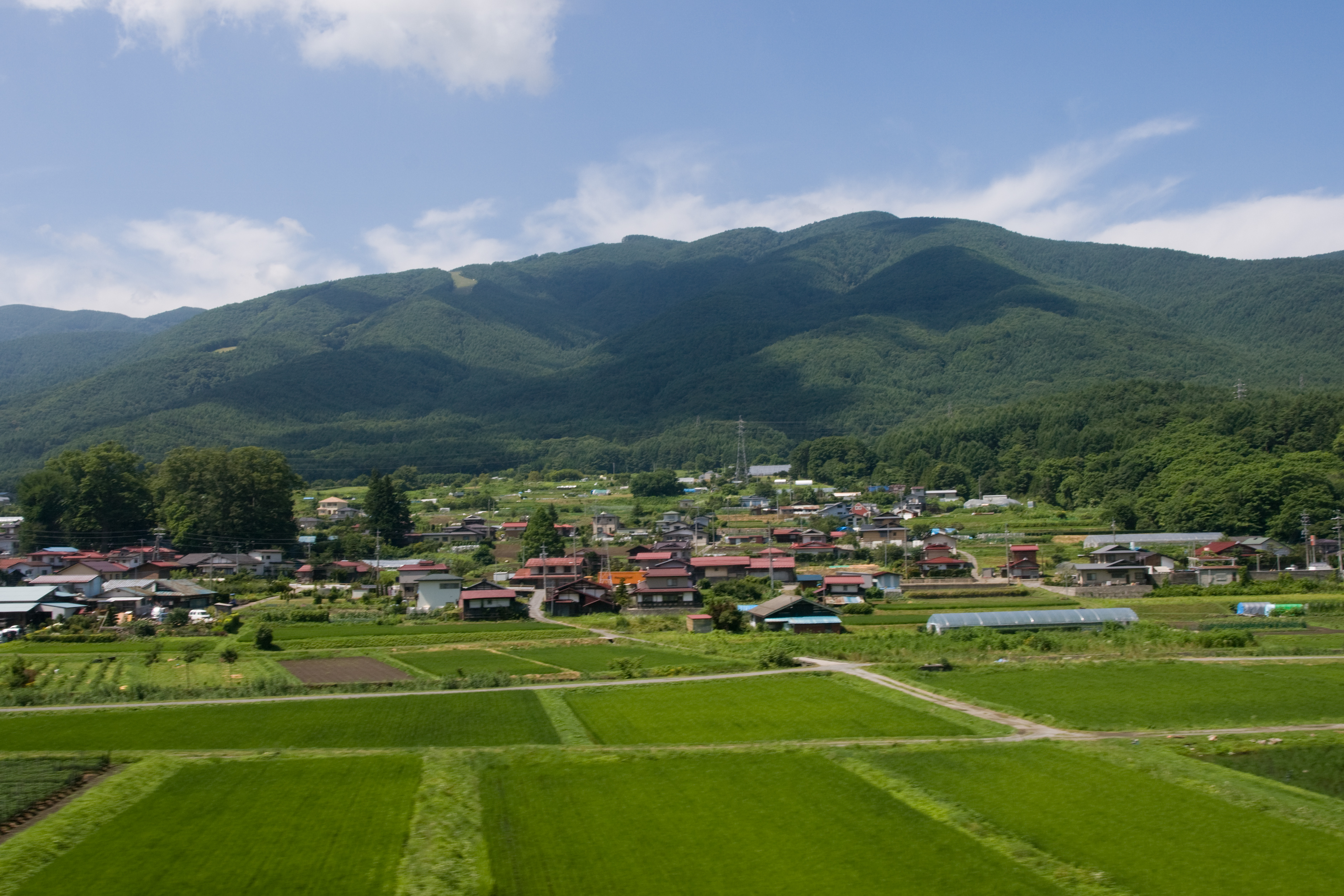
Mount Nyukasa and Fujimi landscape

Fujimi (富士見町, Fujimi-machi) is a town located in Nagano Prefecture, Japan. As of 1 April 2019, the town had an estimated population of 14,485 in 5958 households, and a population density of 102 persons per km^{2}. The total area of the town is 144.76 square kilometres (55.89 sq mi).

== Geography ==
Fujimi is located in a very mountainous area within the Suwa region of east-central Nagano, and includes the Akaishi Mountains, including Mount Nyukasa (1955 meters) partly within its borders. The town has an average altitude of 977 meters.

=== Climate ===
The town has a climate characterized by characterized by hot and humid summers, and relatively mild winters (Köppen climate classification Cfa). The average annual temperature in Fujimi is 9.6 °C. The average annual rainfall is 1411 mm with September as the wettest month. The temperatures are highest on average in August, at around 22.3 °C, and lowest in January, at around -2.7 °C.

=== Surrounding municipalities ===
- Nagano Prefecture
  - Chino
  - Hara
  - Ina
- Yamanashi Prefecture
  - Hokuto

== Demographics ==
Per Japanese census data, the population of Fujimi has remained relatively steady over the past 40 years.

Historical population
Year	Pop.	±%
1920	13,275	—
1930	14,997	+13.0%
1940	14,757	−1.6%
1950	18,189	+23.3%
1960	15,982	−12.1%
1970	13,796	−13.7%
1980	14,080	+2.1%
1990	14,835	+5.4%
2000	15,392	+3.8%
2010	15,338	−0.4%
2020	14,084	−8.2%

== History ==
The area of present-day Fujimi was part of ancient Shinano Province. Fujimi Village was established on April 1, 1889, with the establishment of the modern municipalities system. On April 1, 1995, Fujimi merged with the villages of Sakai, Hongo, and Ochiai to form the town of Fujimi.

== Education ==
Fujimi has three public elementary schools and one public middle school operated by the town government, and one public high school operated by the Nagano Prefectural Board of Education. The town also has one public special education school operated by the prefectural government.

== Transportation ==
=== Railway ===
- East Japan Railway Company - Chūō Main Line
  - Shinano-Sakai - Fujimi - Suzurannosato

=== Highway ===
- Chūō Expressway
- National Route 20

== International relations ==
- – Richmond, New Zealand

== Local attractions ==
- Idojiri ruins, a Jōmon-period archaeological site and National Historic Site with on-site museum.

== In popular culture ==
The town is featured in the Forza Motorsport series as the track Fujimi Kaido.

== Notable people ==
- Shigeto Oshida (1922–2003), Dominican priest and Zen Buddhist monk
