= Suwa District, Nagano =

District in Nagano prefecture, Japan

Suwa (諏訪郡, Suwa-gun or Suwa no Kōri) is a district located in southern Nagano Prefecture, Japan.

As of 2003, the district has an estimated population of 46,162 with a density of 181.18 persons per km^{2}. The total area is 254.79 km^{2}.

== Municipalities ==
The district consists of two towns and one village:

- Fujimi (Note: Classified as a town.)
- Hara (Note: Classified as a village.)
- Shimosuwa

== History ==
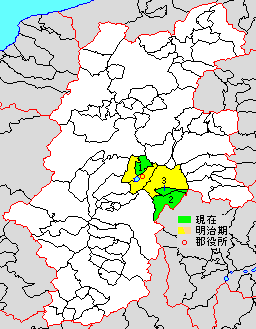
Map showing original extent of Suwa District in Nagano Prefecture: * yellow - areas formerly within the district borders during the early Meiji period: 1. Shimosuwa-machi; 2. Fujimi-machi; 3. Hara-mura

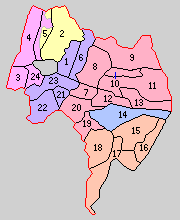
Colored areas are in this district.

- January 4, 1879 - Suwa District was created during the early Meiji period establishment of the municipalities system, which initially consisted of 24 villages. Its district headquarters was located at the village of Kamisuwa.
