= UNEE =

Unee or UNEE may refer to:

- U-Nee (1981–2007), South Korean singer, rapper, dancer and actress
- United North of England Eleven, an itinerant 19th-century cricket team
- Kemerovo International Airport (ICAO airport code UNEE), Kemerovo, Russia
- Specialized Schools Unit (UnEE), Puerto Rico Department of Education

== See also ==
- Une (disambiguation)
- Uni (disambiguation)
- Uny (disambiguation)
