= Uny =

Uny or UNY, may refer to:

== Groups, organizations ==
- UNY (Uny Co., Unicorn Co.), a supermarket and department store chain from Japan
- Yogyakarta State University (UNY; Indonesian: Universitas Negeri Yogyakarta), Sleman, Yogyakarta, Indonesia
- Yacambú University (UNY), Barquisimeto, Venezuela
- Lund University School of Aviation (ICAO airline code UNY); see List of airline codes (L)

== Other uses ==
- Úny, Komárom-Esztergom county, Hungary; a village
- Uny, a 6th-century Cornish saint, becoming Saint Uny

== See also ==
- University of New York (disambiguation)
- St Uny's Church (disambiguation)
- UNEE (disambiguation)
- Une (disambiguation)
- Uni (disambiguation)
- NYU (disambiguation)
