= Northern Yatsugatake Volcanic Group =

Volcanic group on the island of Honshu, Japan

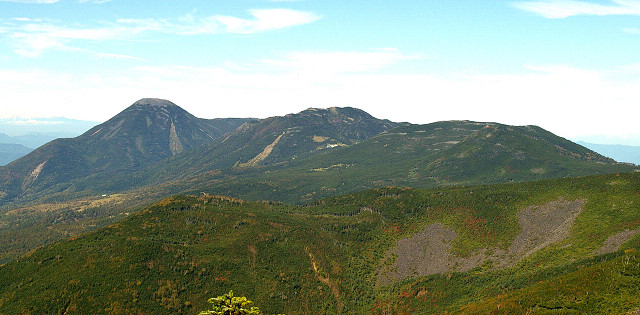
- Mount Shibagare, Mount Yoko, and Mount Tateshina (October 2006)

Highest point
- Peak: Mount Tengu
- Elevation: 2,646 m (8,681 ft)
- Coordinates: 36°01′09″N 138°21′20″E

Naming
- Etymology: Northern Mountains with eight peaks
- Native name: 北八ヶ岳 (Japanese); Kita-Yatsugatake (Japanese)

Geography
- Location within Japan
- Country: Japan
- State: Nagano Prefecture
- Region: Chūbu
- Districts: Kitasaku and Minamisaku District, Nagano
- Municipalities: Chino, Koumi, Minamimaki, Saku, Sakuho and Tateshina
- Parent range: Yatsugatake Mountains
- Borders on: Southern Yatsugatake Volcanic Group
- Biome: Alpine climate

Geology
- Orogeny: Island arc
- Rock age: Quaternary
- Rock type: Volcanic

Northern Yatsugatake Volcanic Group (北八ヶ岳, Kita-Yatsugatake) is a volcanic group of stratovolcanoes and lava domes located in Nagano Prefecture on Honshū in Japan.

== Description ==
The Northern Yatsugatake Volcanic Group is part of the Yatsugatake Mountains. The northern group is defined as the mountains from Mount Futago to Natsuzawa Pass. The highest peak of the mountains is Mount Tengu and the elevation is 2,646 metres.

The southern Yatsugatake mountains are steep and have alpine characteristics. The mountains of the Northern Yatsugatake Volcanic Group are gentler and lower.

Yatsugatake is listed among the 100 famous mountains in Japan, but this refers to the Southern Yatsugatake Volcanic Group. Mount Tateshina is also mentioned as one of the 100 famous mountains, and it is part of the Northern Yatsugatake mountains, but is listed separately.

These mountains are part of the Yatsugatake-Chūshin Kōgen Quasi-National Park.

== Geology and volcanic activity ==
The volcanoes are stratovolcanos that are 1 million to 200,000 years old. The rock is mainly basalt, dacite, and andesite. Mount Yoko has shown the most recent activity and is now considered an active volcano. It last erupted about 800 years ago. In 888 a debris avalanche on the East side of the volcanic massif caused Lake Matsubara to form. The Tateshina-kogen plateau was formed by a large lava flow.

== List of peaks ==
The following peaks and passes, from North to South, make up the Northern Yatsugatake Volcanic Group:

- Mount Tateshina (also known as Suwa Fuji), stratovolcano 2,530 m (8,301 ft)
- Ogawara Pass 2,093 m (6,867 ft)
- Mount Futago, cinder cone 2,224 m (7,297 ft)
- Mount Otake 2,381 m (7,812 ft)
- Mount Yoko (also known at Mount Kita Yoko), lava dome 2,480 m (8,136 ft)
- Mount Mitsudake 2,360 m (7,743 ft)
- Mount Amaike 2,325 m (7,628 ft)
- Mount Shimagare, lava dome 2,403 m (7,884 ft)
- Mount Chausu, lava dome 2,384 m (7,822 ft)
- Mugikusa Pass 2,127 m (6,978 ft)
- Mount Maru 2,330 m (7,644 ft)
- Nyu 2,152 m (7,060 ft)
- Mount Naka 2,496 m (8,189 ft)
- Mount Tengu 2,646 m (8,681 ft)
- Mount Neishi 2,603 m (8,540 ft)
- Mount Mikaburi 2,590 m (8,497 ft)

== See also ==
- List of volcanoes in Japan
- List of mountains in Japan

== Gallery ==
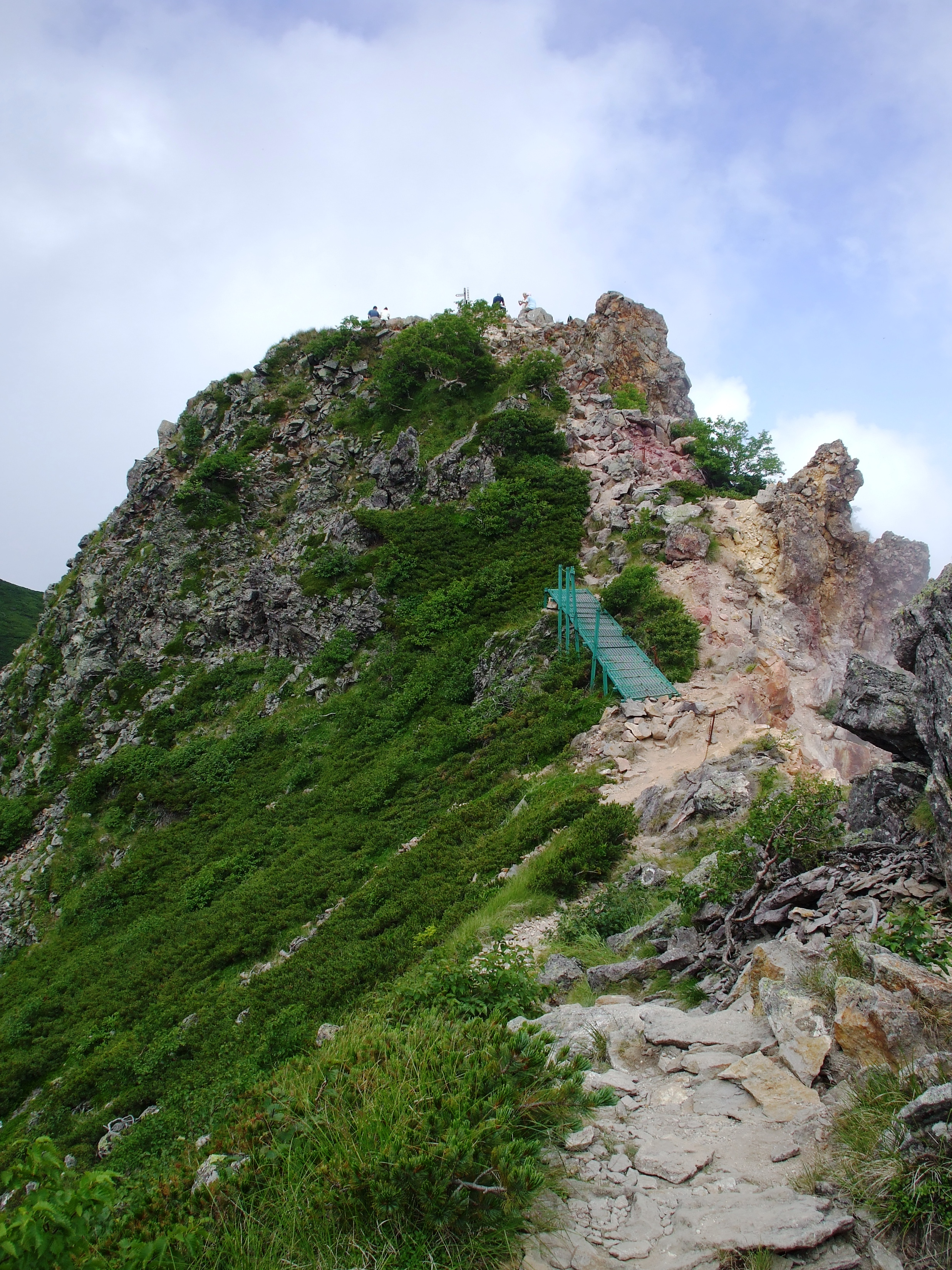
Mount Higashi-Tengu, the highest peak of the Kita-Yatsugatake Mountains

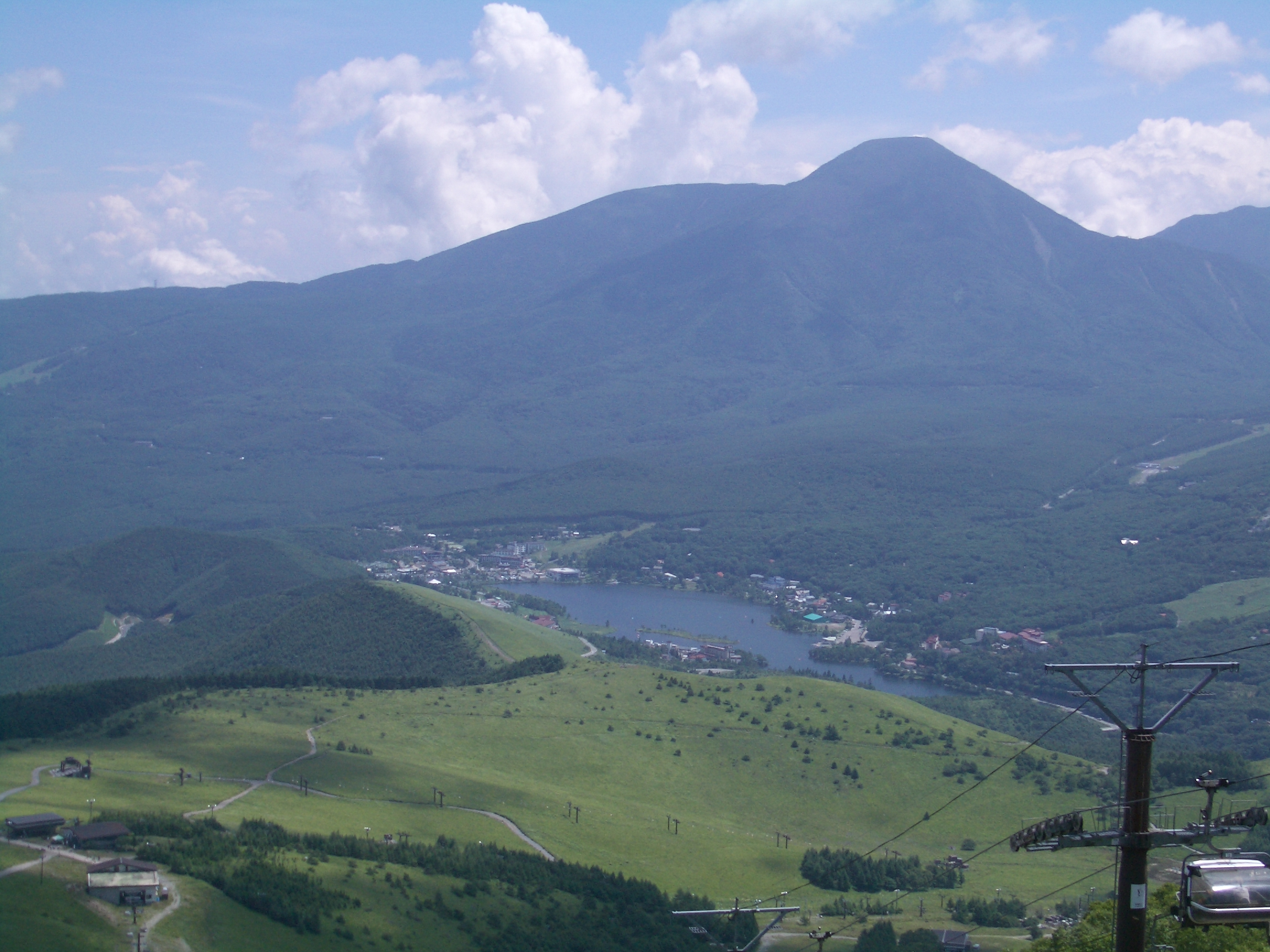
Mount Tateshina from Lake Shirakaba

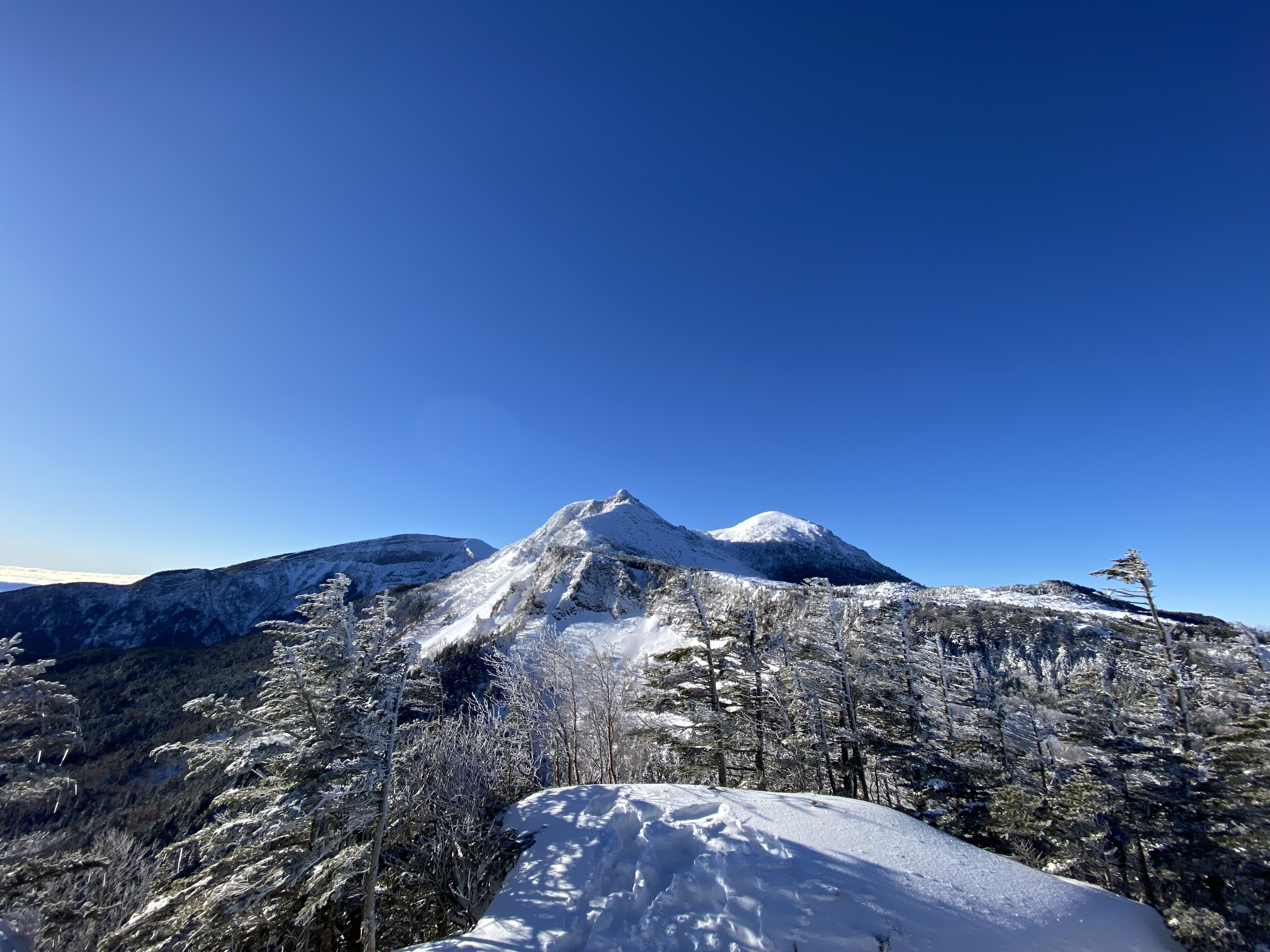
Mount Higashi Tengu (centre), Nishi Tengu (right), and Mount Iō (left) in winter

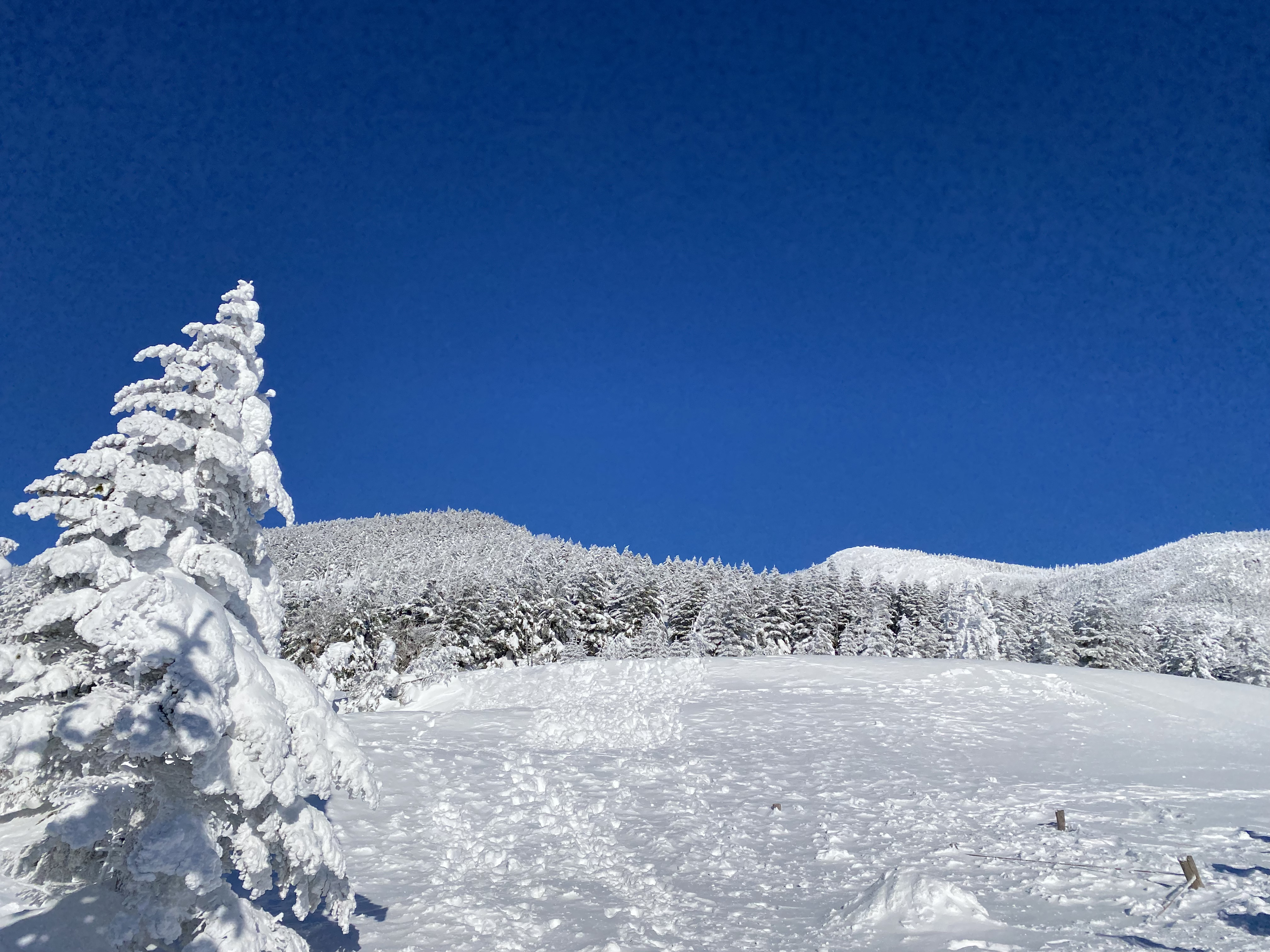
Mount Kitayokodake in winter
