= Uni (inhabited locality) =

Uni (Russian: Уни) is the name of several inhabited localities in Russia.

Urban localities

- Uni, Kirov Oblast, an urban-type settlement in Uninsky District of Kirov Oblast

Rural localities

- Uni, Khabarovsk Krai, a selo in Nanaysky District of Khabarovsk Krai
