= Uni =

Uni or UNI may refer to:

== Entertainment ==
- Uni Records, a division of MCA, formally called Universal City Records
- "U.N.I.", a song by Ed Sheeran from + (Plus)
- Uni, a species in the Neopets Trading Card Game
- Uni, a character in the anime Reborn!
- Uni, a character in the television series Dungeons and Dragons
- Uni, a fictional character in the Hyperdimension Neptunia Mk2 video game

== Organizations ==
- UNI Financial Cooperation, a Canadian credit union
- Ente Nazionale Italiano di Unificazione, an Italian technical standards organization
- UNI global union, an international trade union federation
- The University of Northern Iowa, a university in the United States
- UNI, an alternative name for the Northern Iowa Panthers, the athletic program of the University of Northern Iowa
- The National University of Engineering, a university in Peru
- The National University of Engineering in Nicaragua
- United News of India, an Indian news agency
- National Union of Independents (disambiguation), the name of several political parties

== Transport ==
- UNI, the reporting mark of Unity Railways, a defunct Pennsylvania railroad
- UNI, the MTR station code for University station, Hong Kong

== Other uses ==
- Uni, a colloquial term for university
- Uni (food), sea urchin in Japanese cuisine
- Uni (letter), a glyph in Georgian scripts
- Uni (mythology), the supreme goddess of Etruscan mythology
- Uni (inhabited locality), name of several places in Russia
- Uni language (ISO 639-3 language code: uni), a language of Papua New Guinea
- uni-ball, brand of pens and pencils made by the Mitsubishi Pencil Company
- In mathematics, the category of uniform spaces
- User–network interface, the junction from which a telecommunications service is connected between the service provider and the end user
- UNI, fashion denotes unisex clothing
- UNI, the governance token of the Uniswap cryptocurrency exchange
- 55637 Uni, a large trans-Neptunian object

== See also ==
- Unis (disambiguation)
- Unni (disambiguation)
- Uny (disambiguation)
