= Yatsugatake-Chūshin Kōgen Quasi-National Park =

Quasi-national park in Japan

- 八ヶ岳中信高原国定公園
- IUCN category V (protected landscape/seascape)
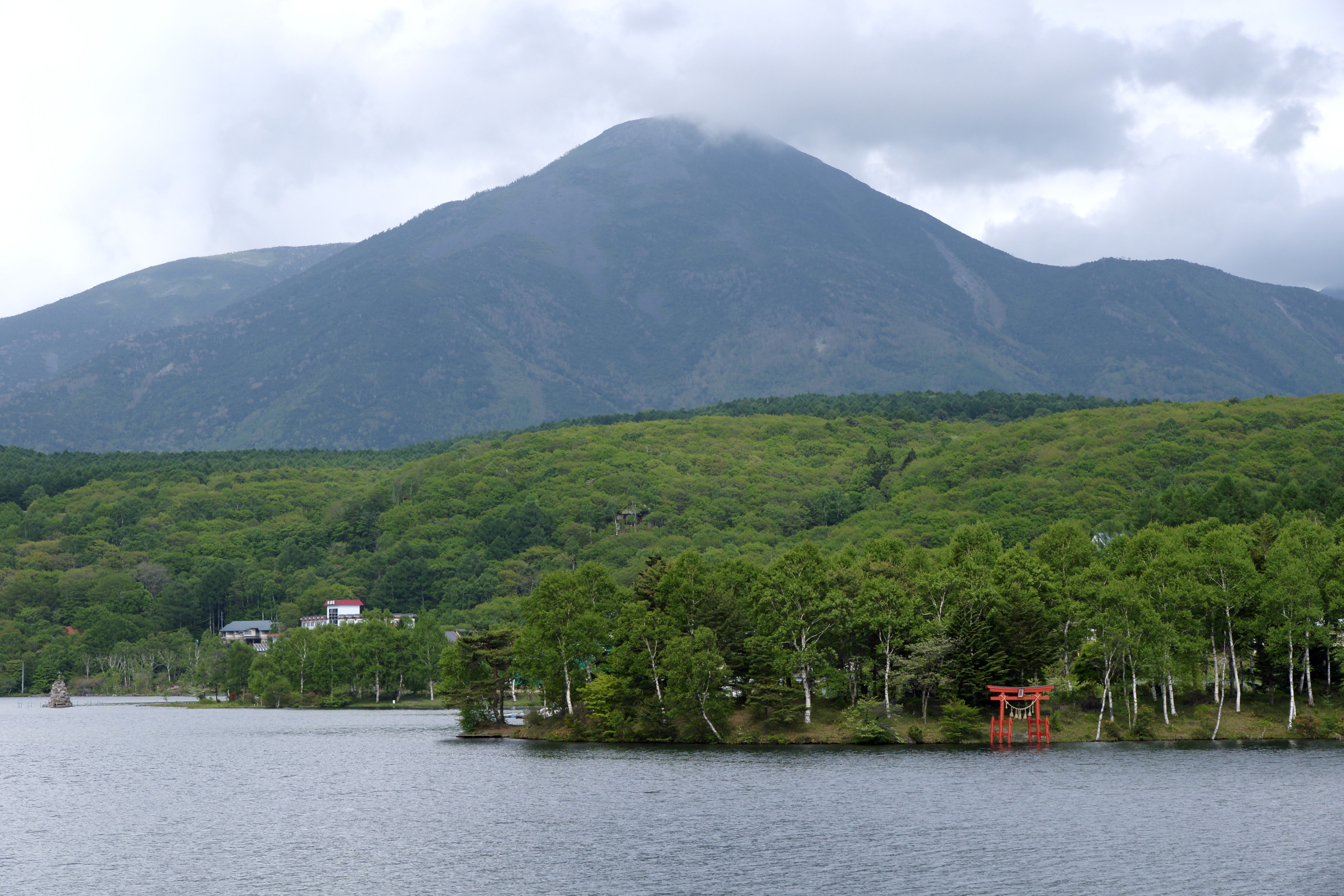
- Lake Shirakaba in Yatsugatake-Chūshin Kōgen Quasi-National Park

- Location within Japan
- Location: Honshū, Japan
- Nearest city: Chino, Fujimi, Hara, Hokuto, Koumi, Matsumoto, Minamimaki, Nagawa, Okaya, Saku, Sakuho, Shimosuwa, Shiojiri, Suwa, and Tateshina
- Coordinates: 36°07′10″N 138°25′11″E
- Area: 39,857 ha (98,490 acres)
- Established: January 1, 1964
- Governing body: Nagano and Yamanahi prefectural governments

Yatsugatake-Chūshin Kōgen Quasi-National Park (八ヶ岳中信高原国定公園, Yatsugatake-Chūshin Kōgen Kokutei Kōen) is a quasi-national park on Honshū in Japan. It is rated a protected landscape (category V) according to the IUCN. The park includes the Yatsugatake Mountains and the surrounding lava plateaus: Tateshina plateau, Kirigamine, and Utsukushigahara. It straddles the border between Nagano and Yamanashi prefectures. Mount Aka is the highest point in the park at 2,899 m (9,511 ft). The volcanoes of the Yatsugatake mountains erupted from the middle of the Fossa Magna (ja) and spread skirts of lava south, east and west. Lake Matsubara, Shirakoma Pond, and Lake Shirakaba attract tourists to the region for boating, skating, and camping. Utsukushigahara is a lava plateau at the northern end of the park and offers views of the Northern Alps. The extensive lava plateau of Kirigahara is popular for hiking. There are also a number of onsens in addition to the hotsprings at Tateshina. The park was designated a quasi-national in 1964.

Like all quasi-national parks in Japan, the park is managed by the prefectural government.

== See also ==
- List of national parks of Japan
- Northern Yatsugatake Volcanic Group
- Southern Yatsugatake Volcanic Group

Mountains:

- Mount Nyū
- Mount Tateshina
- Mount Yoko
