= Mount Tengu =

Mountain in the country of Japan

- 天狗岳
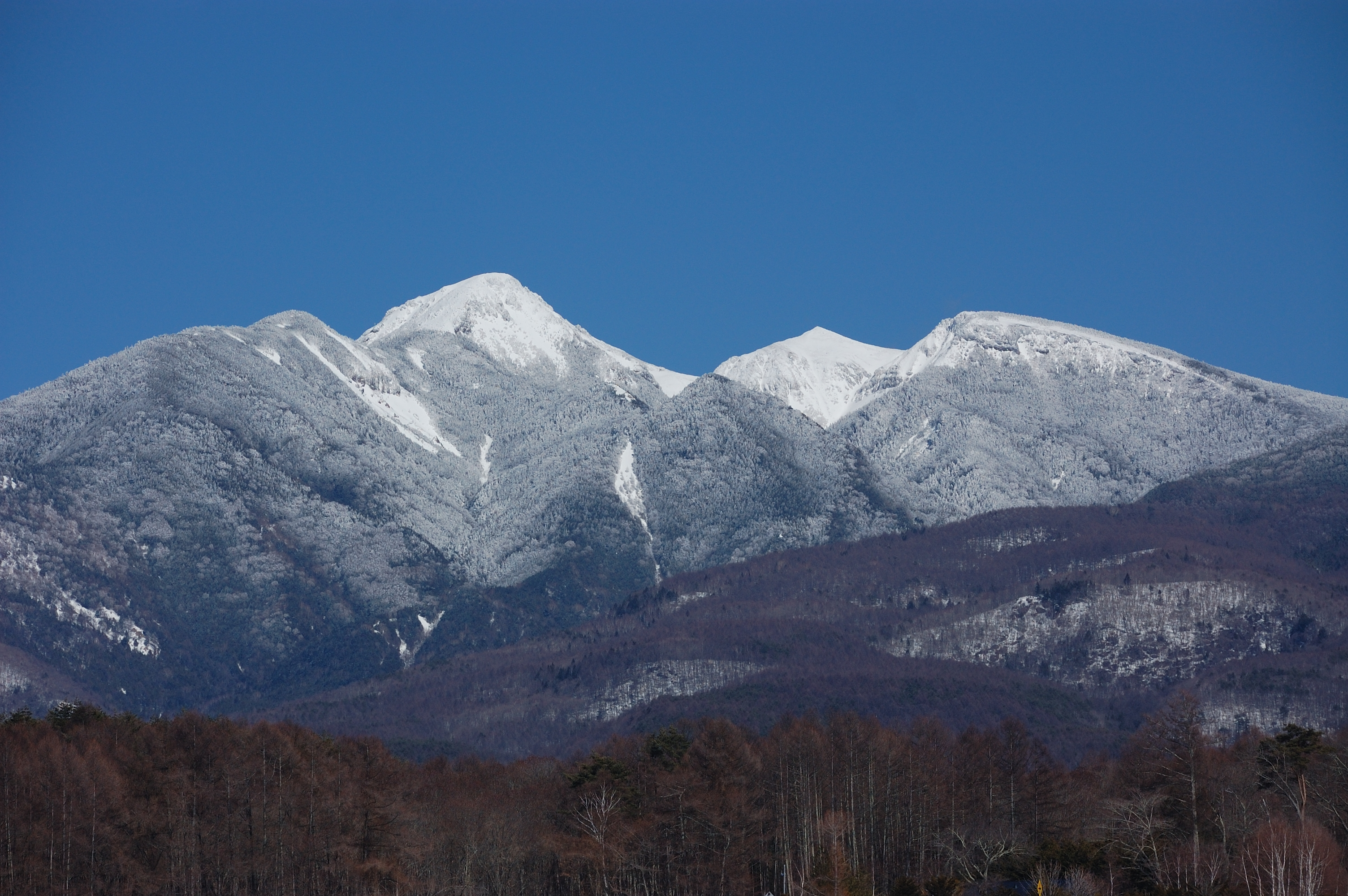
- View of Mount Tengu from the southwest

Highest point
- Elevation: 2,646 m (8,681 ft)
- Prominence: 216 m (709 ft)
- Listing: List of mountains and hills of Japan by height
- Coordinates: 36°01′09″N 138°21′20″E

Naming
- Language of name: Japanese
- Pronunciation: [teŋɡudake]

Geography
- Location: On the border of Chino and Koumi of Nagano in Japan
- Parent range: Northern Yatsugatake Volcanic Group

Geology
- Mountain type: Stratovolcano

Mount Tengu (天狗岳, Tengu-dake) is a mountain on the border of Chino and Koumi of Nagano in Japan. This mountain is the highest mountains of Northern Yatsugatake Volcanic Group, and consists of two peaks, Mount Nishi Tengu, 2,646 m (8,681 ft) and Mount Higashi Tengu, 2,640 m (8,661 ft). Mount Tengu is named for the mythical Tengu of Japanese folklore.

== Description ==
Mount Tengu is a stratovolcano. The mountain forms part of Yatsugatake-Chūshin Kōgen Quasi-National Park, and is one of Japan's 200 most famous mountains (日本二百名山, Nihon nihyaku meizan).

Mount Neishi, 2,603 m (8,540 ft), is located just to the south of Mount Hisashi Tengu. Mount Naka (中山, Naka yama), 2,496 m (8,189 ft), is located to the north of Mount Hisashi Tengu.

== Access ==
- Shibunoyu Bus Stop (渋の湯バス亭, Shibunoyu basu tei) or Tatsunokanmae Bus Stop (辰野館前バス亭, Tatsunokanmae basu tei) of Alpico Kōtsū from Chino Station

== Mountain Climbing ==
The main traverse route of the Yatsugatake Mountain Range passes through the eastern summit of Mount Tengu. In addition, there are mountain trails on the western side of Mount Tengu from Shibunoyu, 1,880 m (6,168 ft), in Oku-Tateshina Onsen Village and from Karasawa Kosen, and on the eastern side from Inakoyu via Honzawa Onsen.

A mountain hut, Kuroyuri Hutte, 2,400 m (7,874 ft), is located at Kuroyuridaira, just west of Nakayama Pass (中山峠, Nakayamatōge), where the mountain trail from Shibunoyu joins the main traverse route. The trail is approximately 2.5 hours from Shibunoyu to Kuroyuri Hutte, and then 90 minutes to Higashi Tengu. Nishi Tengu is a further 20 minutes. Kuroyuri Hutte is open year-round.

== Gallery ==
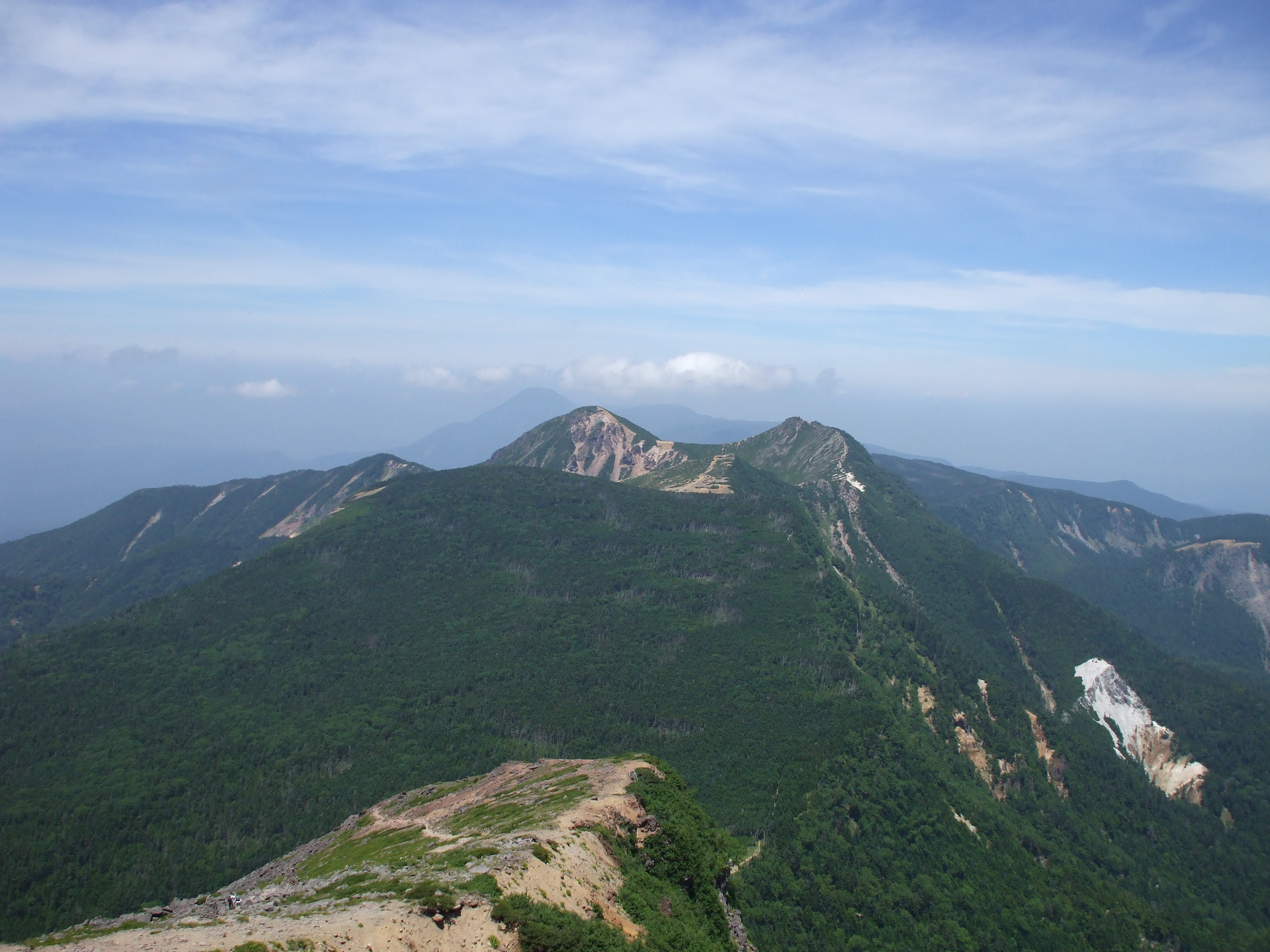
Mount Tengu from Mount Iō

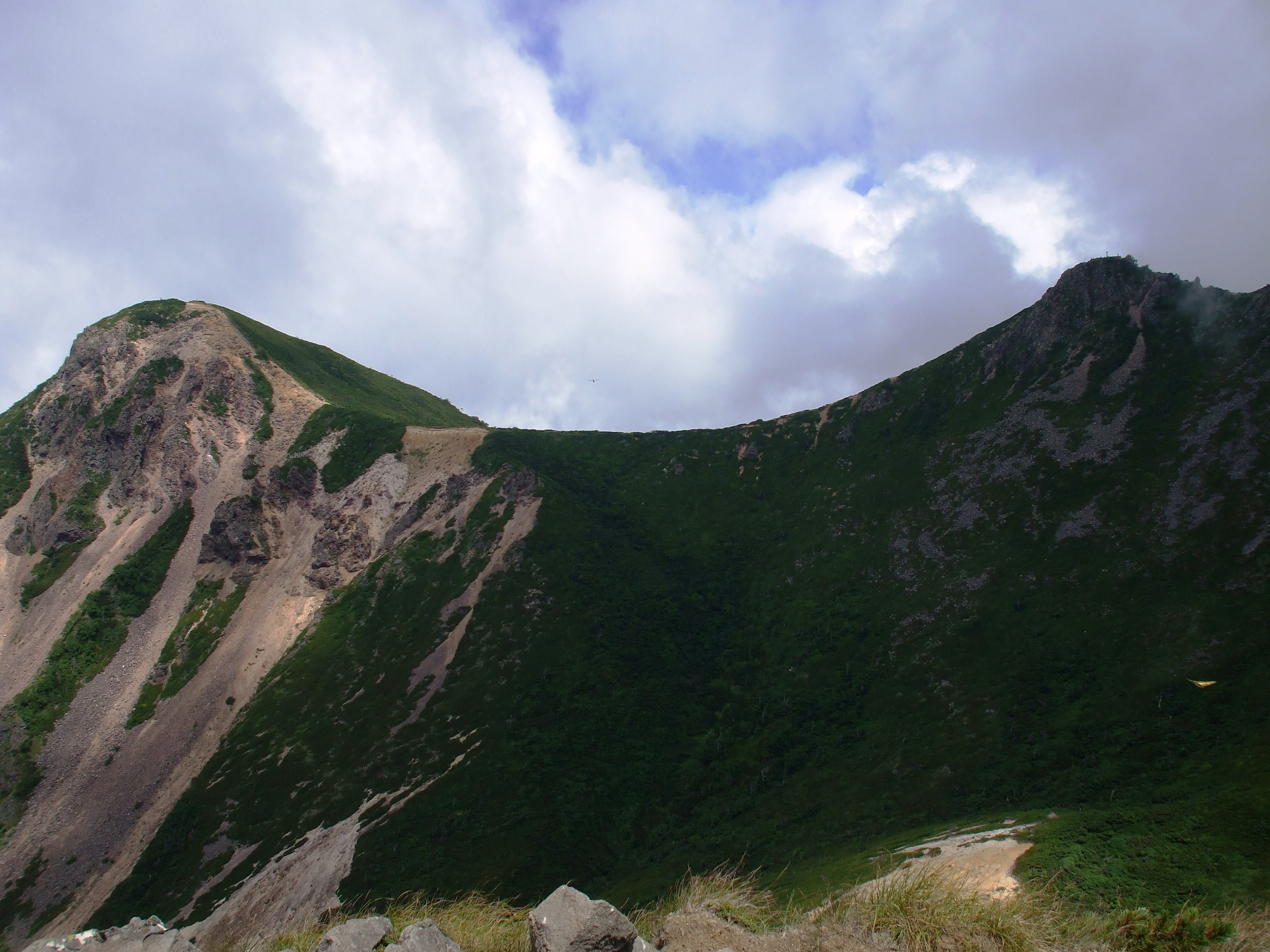
Mount Nishi-Tengu (Left) and Mount Higashi-Tengu from Mount Neishi

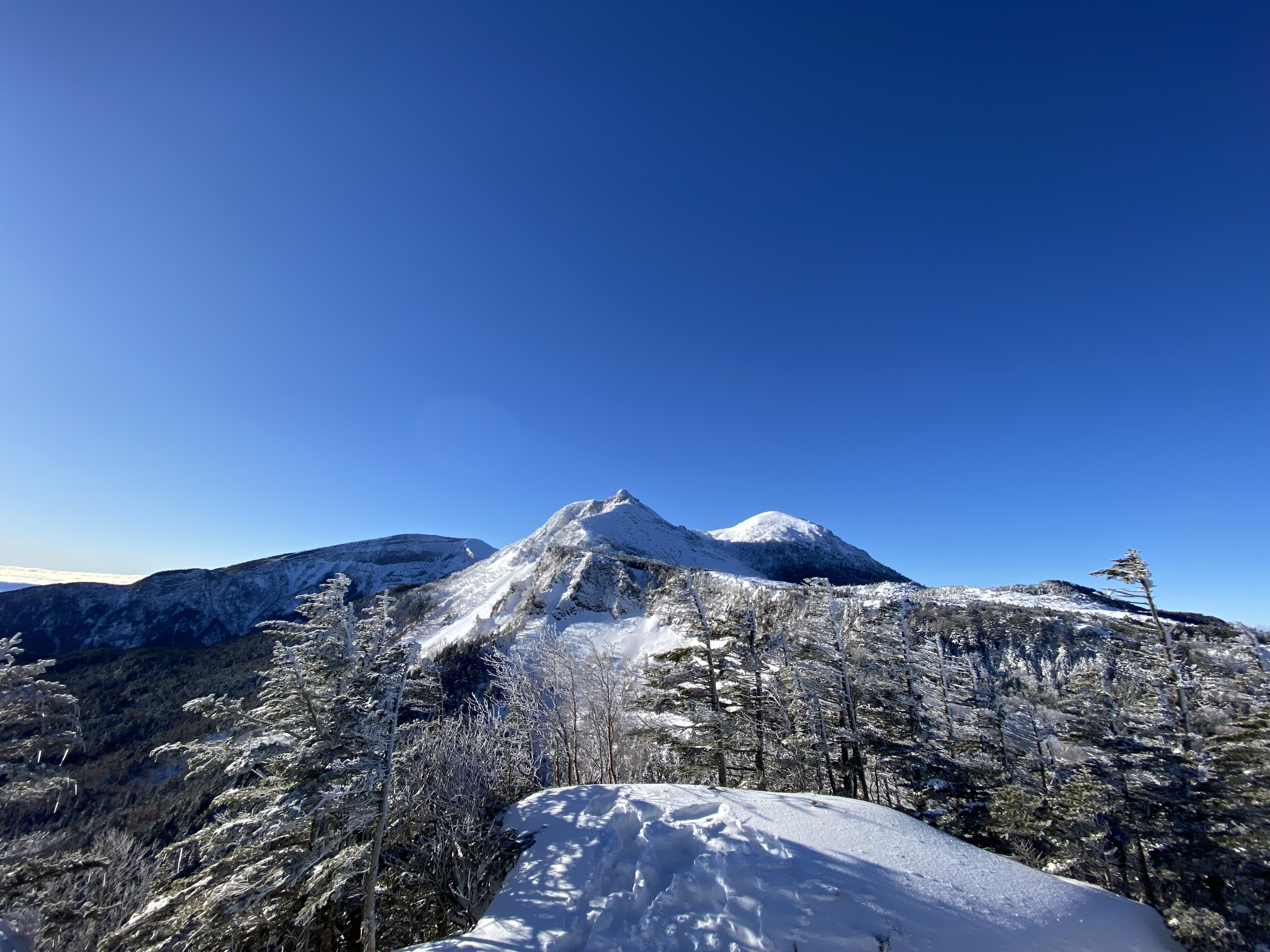
Mount Higashi Tengu (centre), Nishi Tengu (right), and Mount Iō (left) in winter

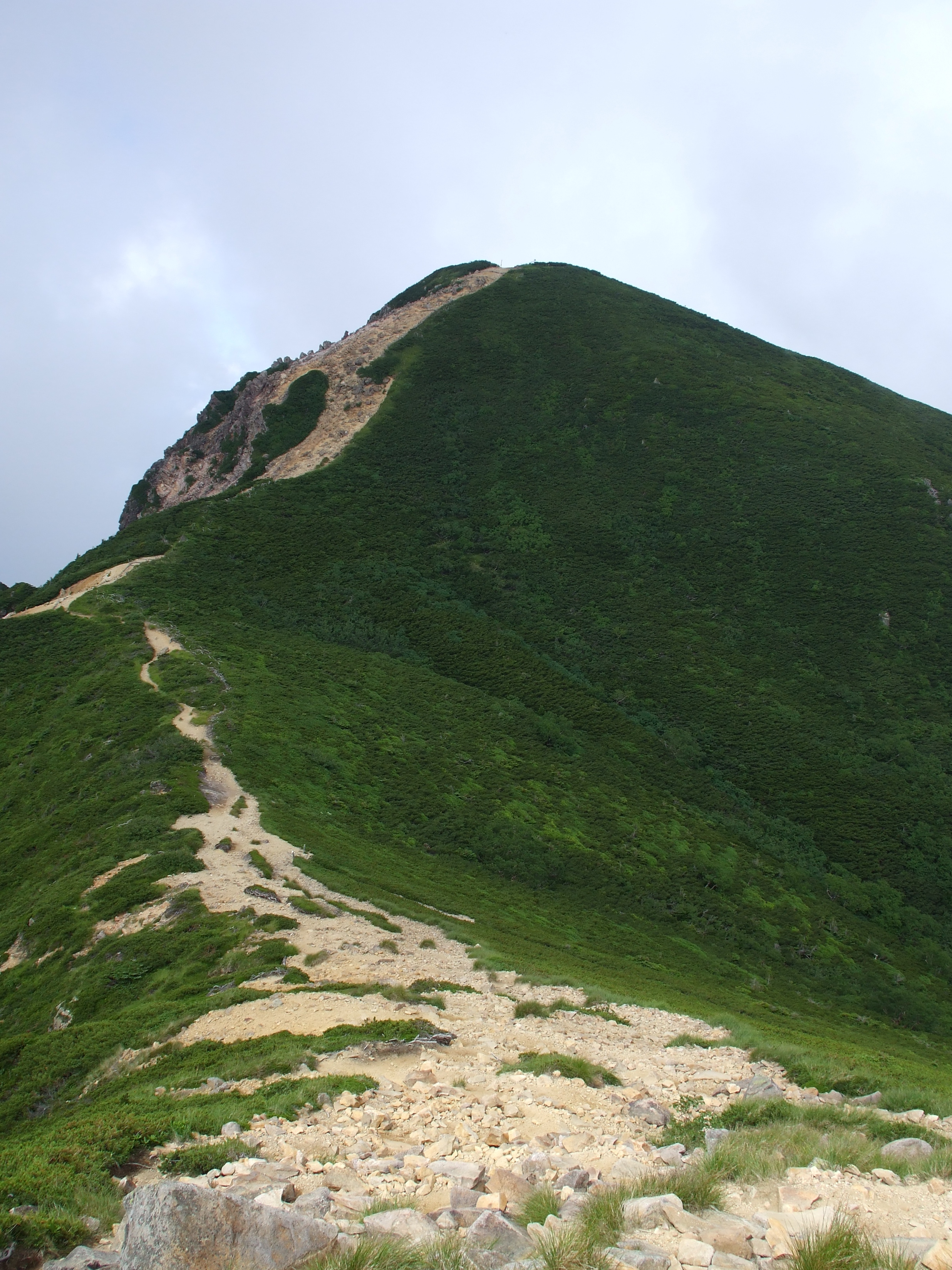
Mount Nishi-Tengu from Mount Higashi-Tengu

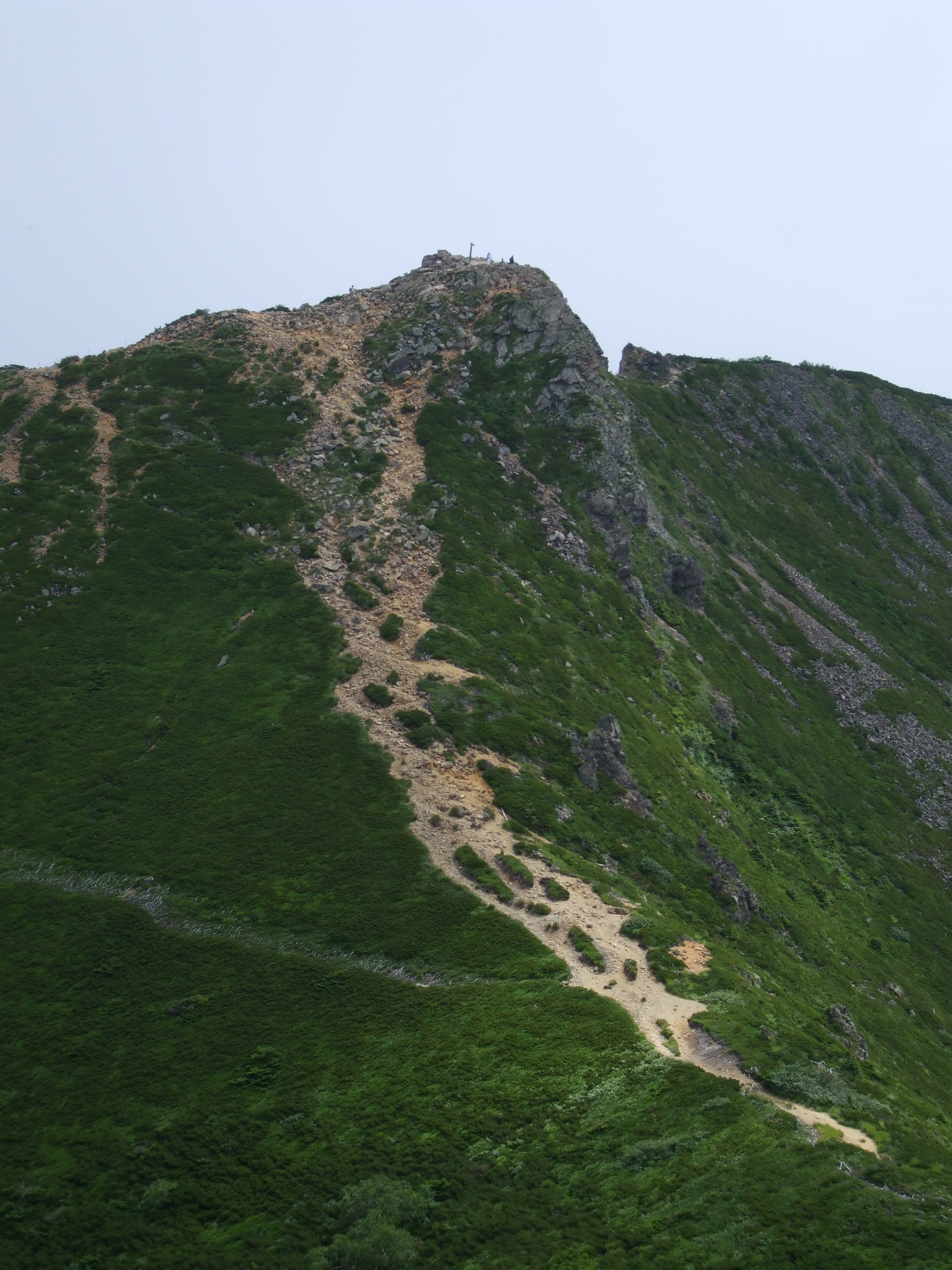
Mount Higashi-Tengu from Mount Nishi-Tengu

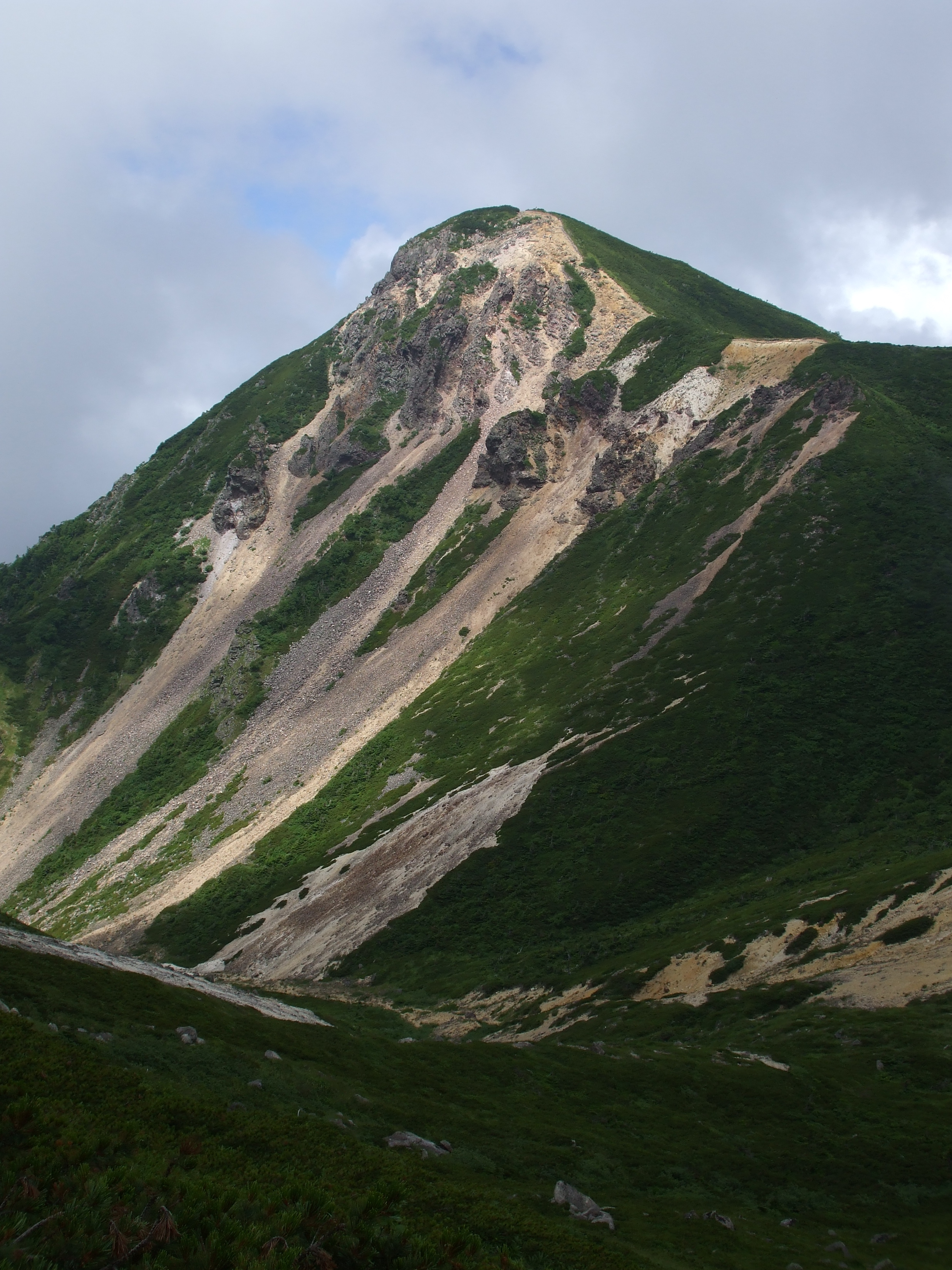
Mount Nishi-Tengu from Mount Neishi
