= St Uny's Church =

St Uny's Church refers to churches dedicated to St Euny or Uny:

- St Uny's Church, Lelant, a church in Cornwall, England
- St Uny's Church, Redruth, a church in Cornwall, England

== See also ==
- Uny (disambiguation)
