= Mount Nyū =

Mountain in the country of Japan

- 乳／ニュウ
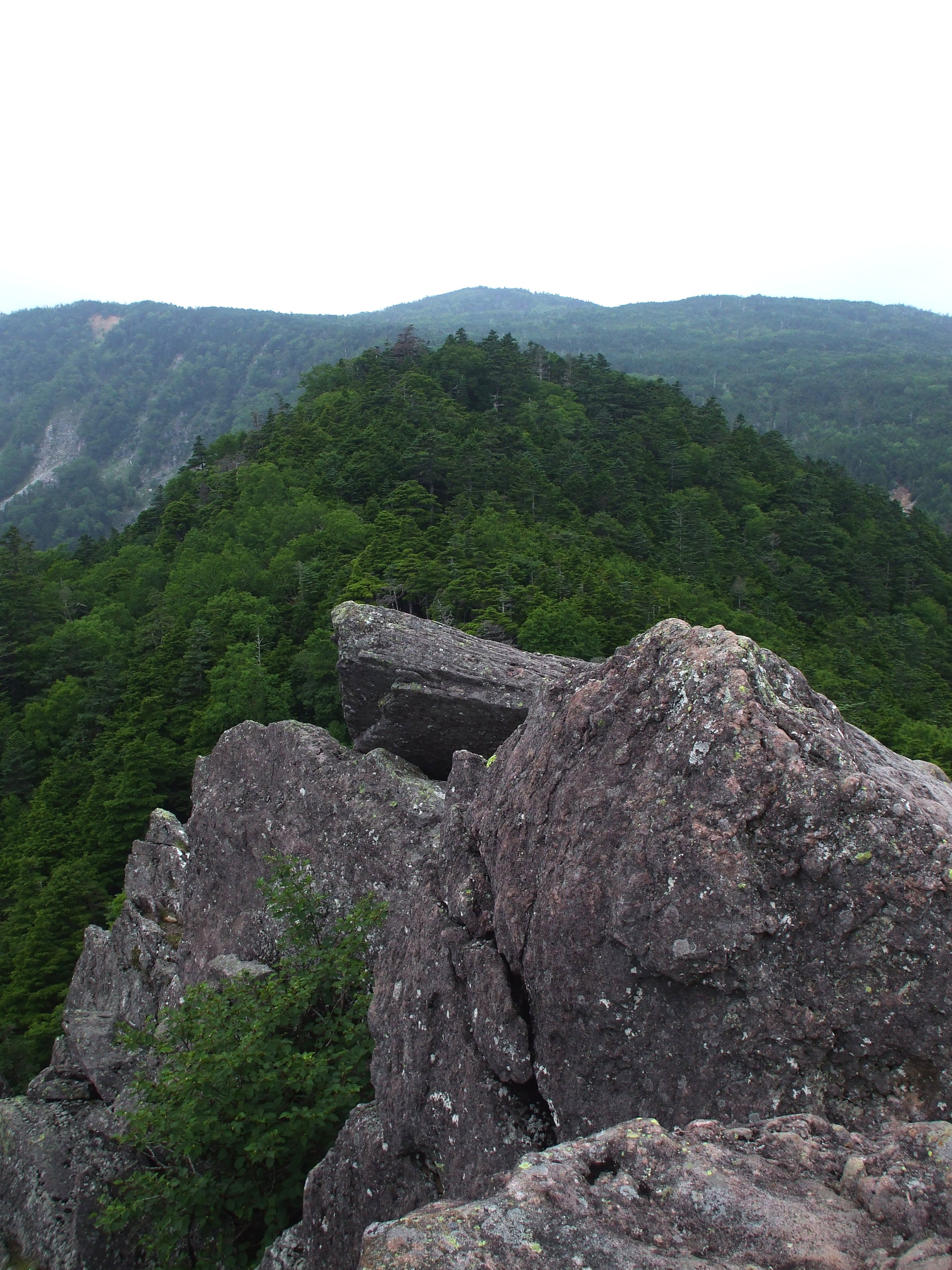
- Mount Nyū (July 2008)

Highest point
- Elevation: 2,351.9 m (7,716 ft)
- Listing: List of mountains and hills of Japan by height
- Coordinates: 36°2′22″N 138°22′14″E

Naming
- Language of name: Japanese
- Pronunciation: [njuː]

Geography
- Location: Koumi, Nagano, Japan
- Parent range: Northern Yatsugatake Volcanic Group

Geology
- Mountain type: Stratovolcano

Mount Nyū (乳, Nyū) is a stratovolcano of the Northern Yatsugatake Volcanic Group in Koumi, Nagano Prefecture, Japan. This mountain is part of the Yatsugatake-Chūshin Kōgen Quasi-National Park.

== Climbing route ==
There are several routes to reach to the top of Mount Nyū. One is from Shirokoma Pond, it takes one and half hours. Another major route is from Mount Naka.

== Access ==
- Shirokomaike-iriguchi Bus Stop of Chikuma Bus
- Mugikusa-toge Bus Stop of Chikuma Bus

== Gallery ==
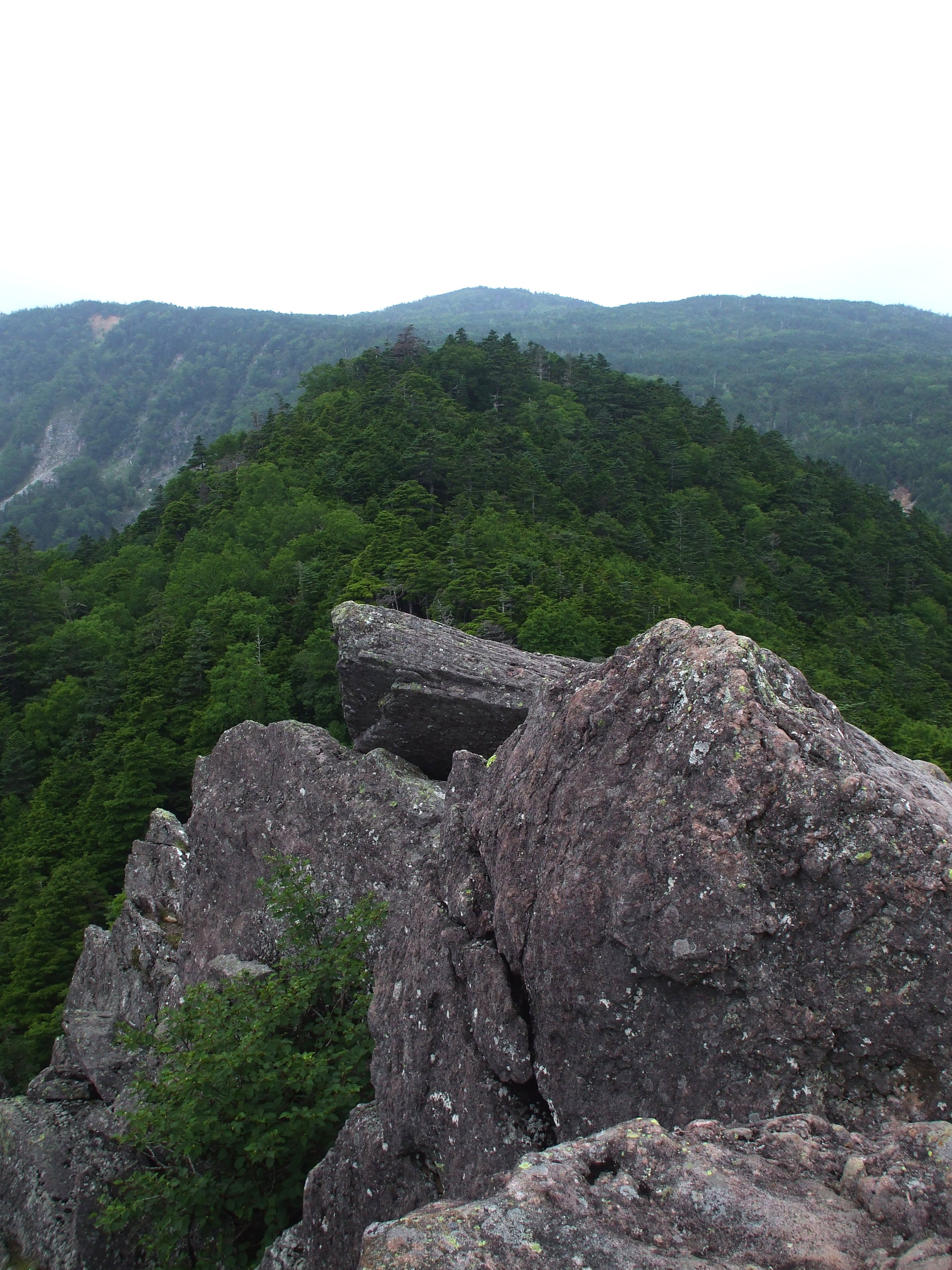
Mount Nyū and Mount Naka.

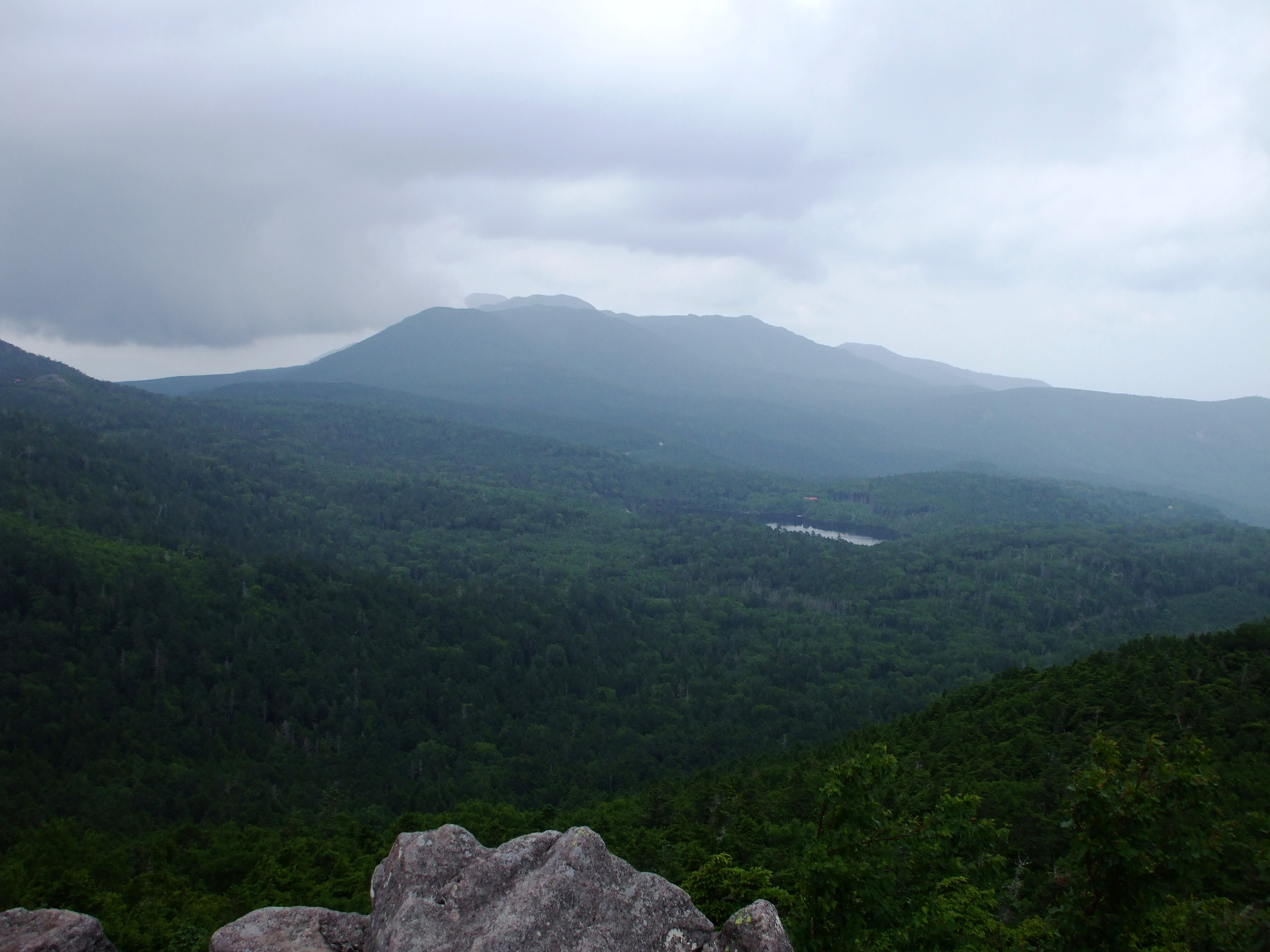
Mount Tateshina, Mount Kitayoko and Shirokoma Pond from Mount Nyū

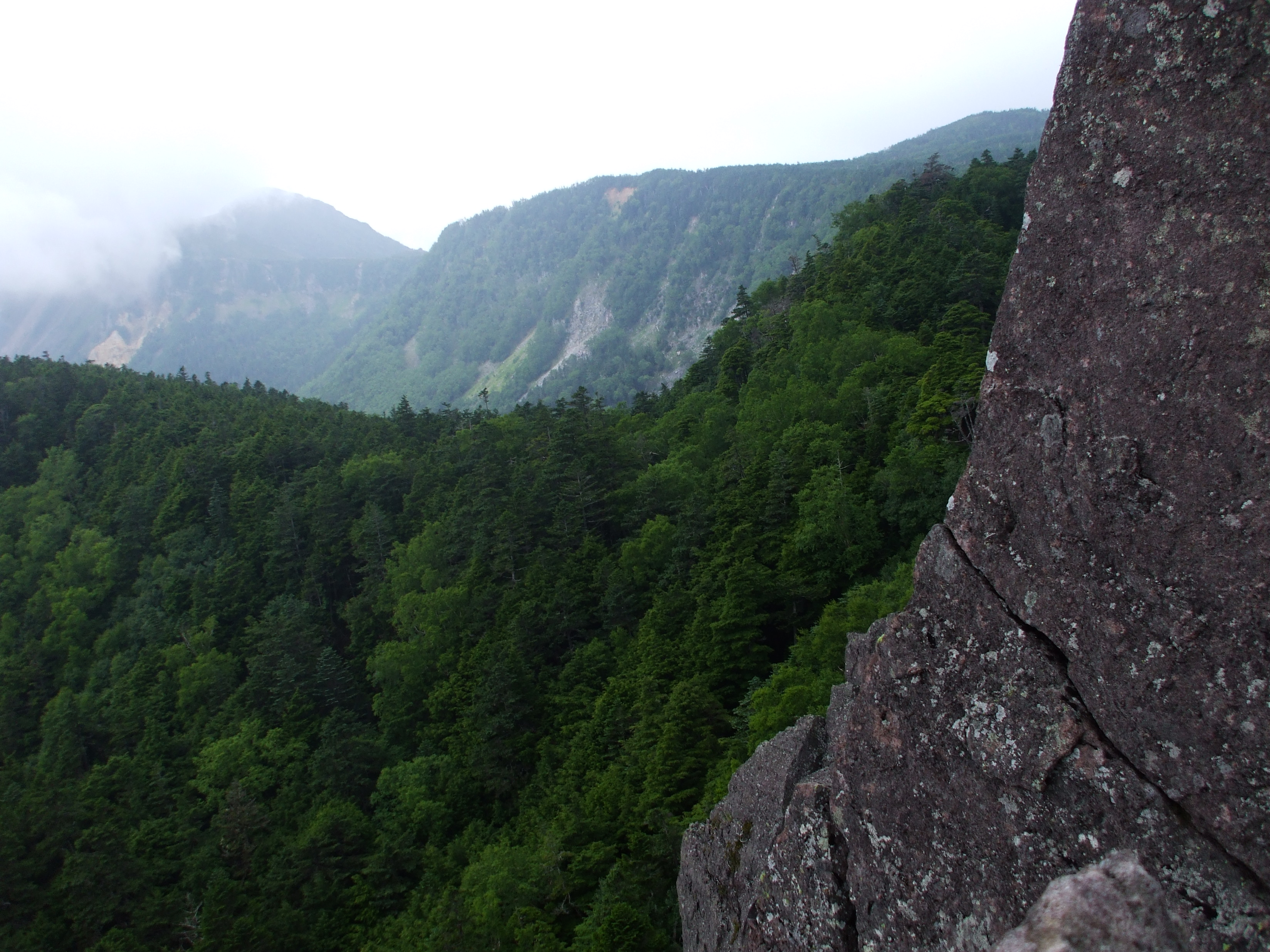
Mount Iō from Mount Nyū

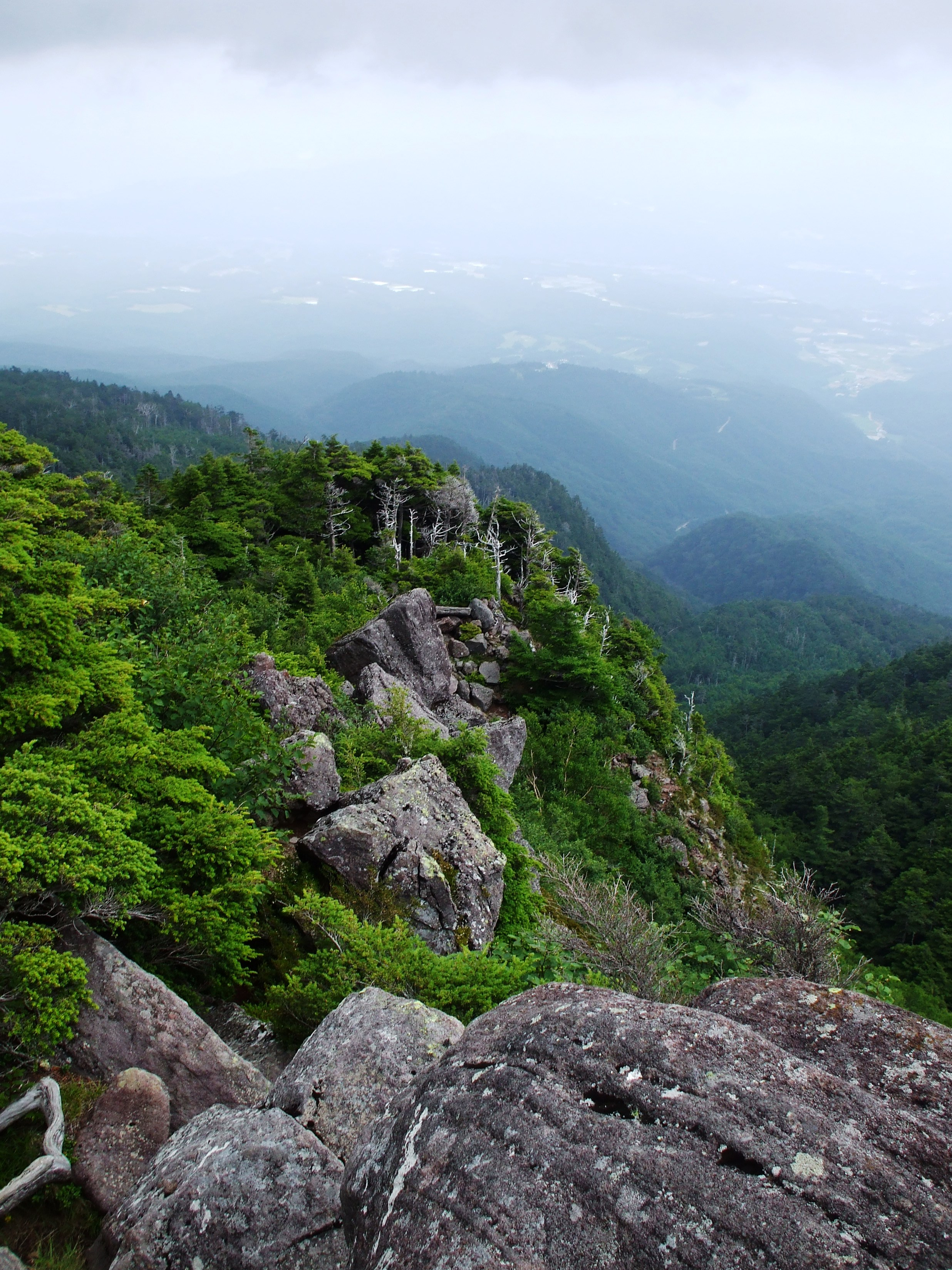
East side view from the top of Mount Nyū

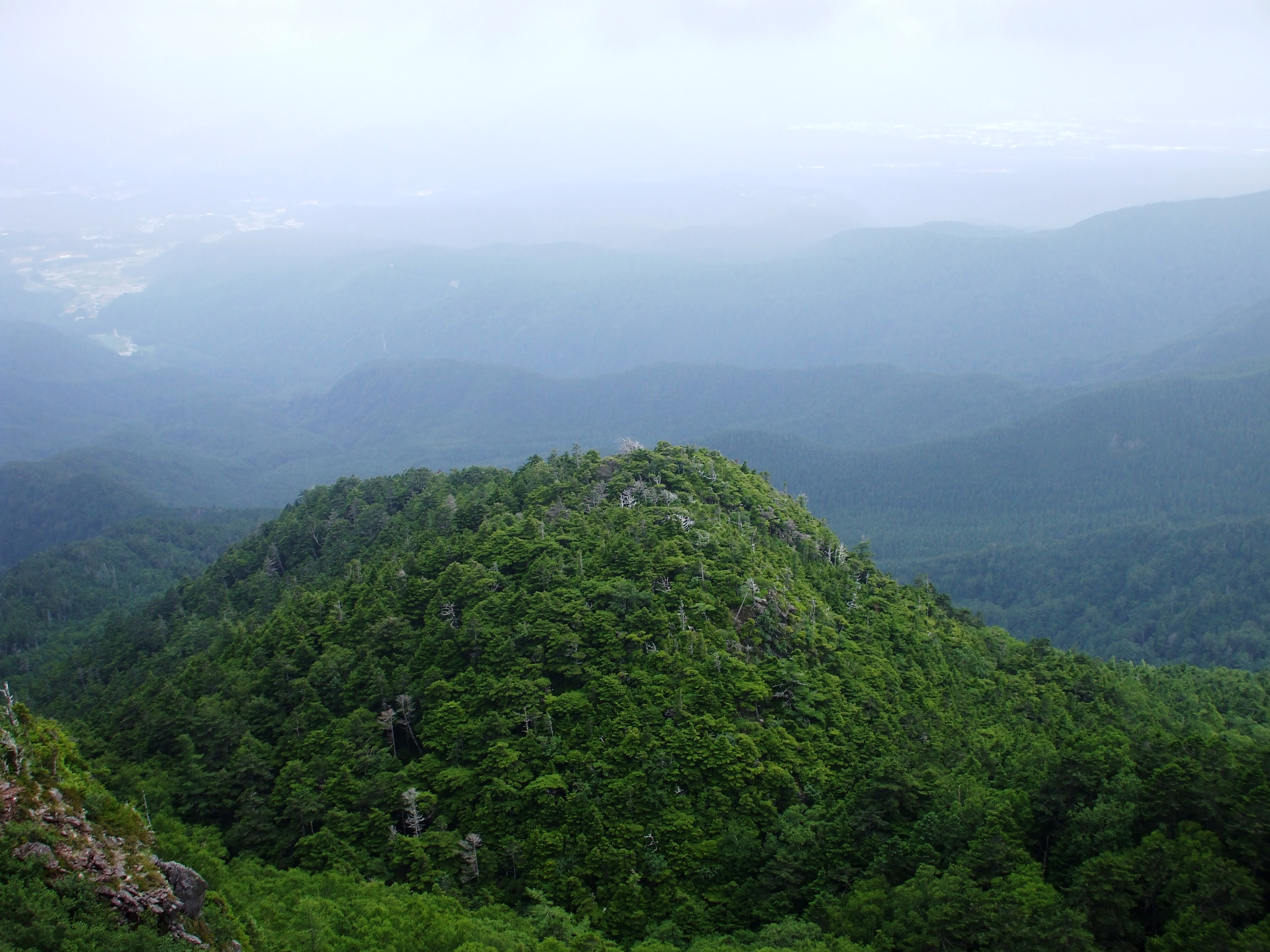
Southeast side view the top of Mount Nyū

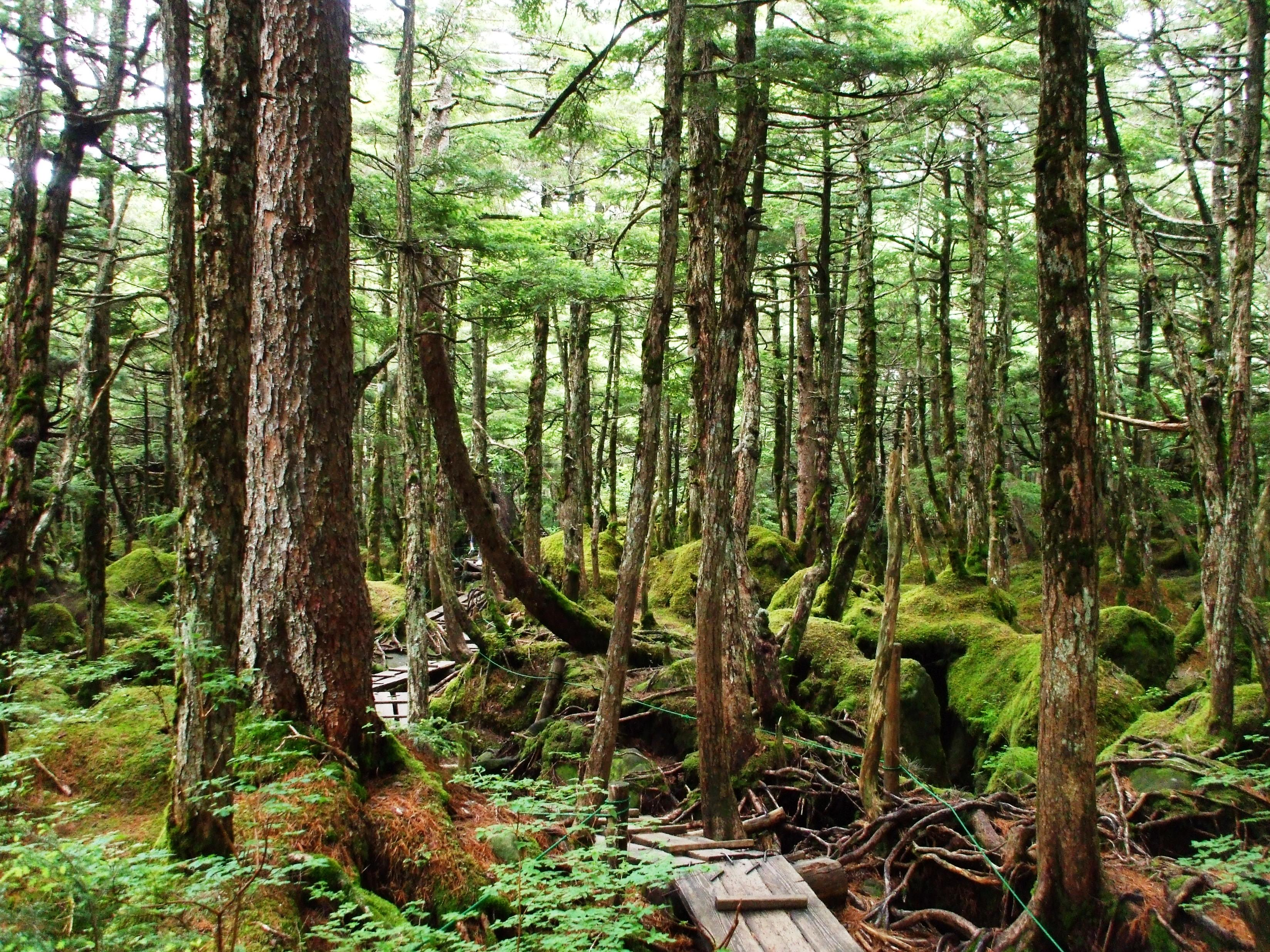
At the route to Mount Nyū (1)

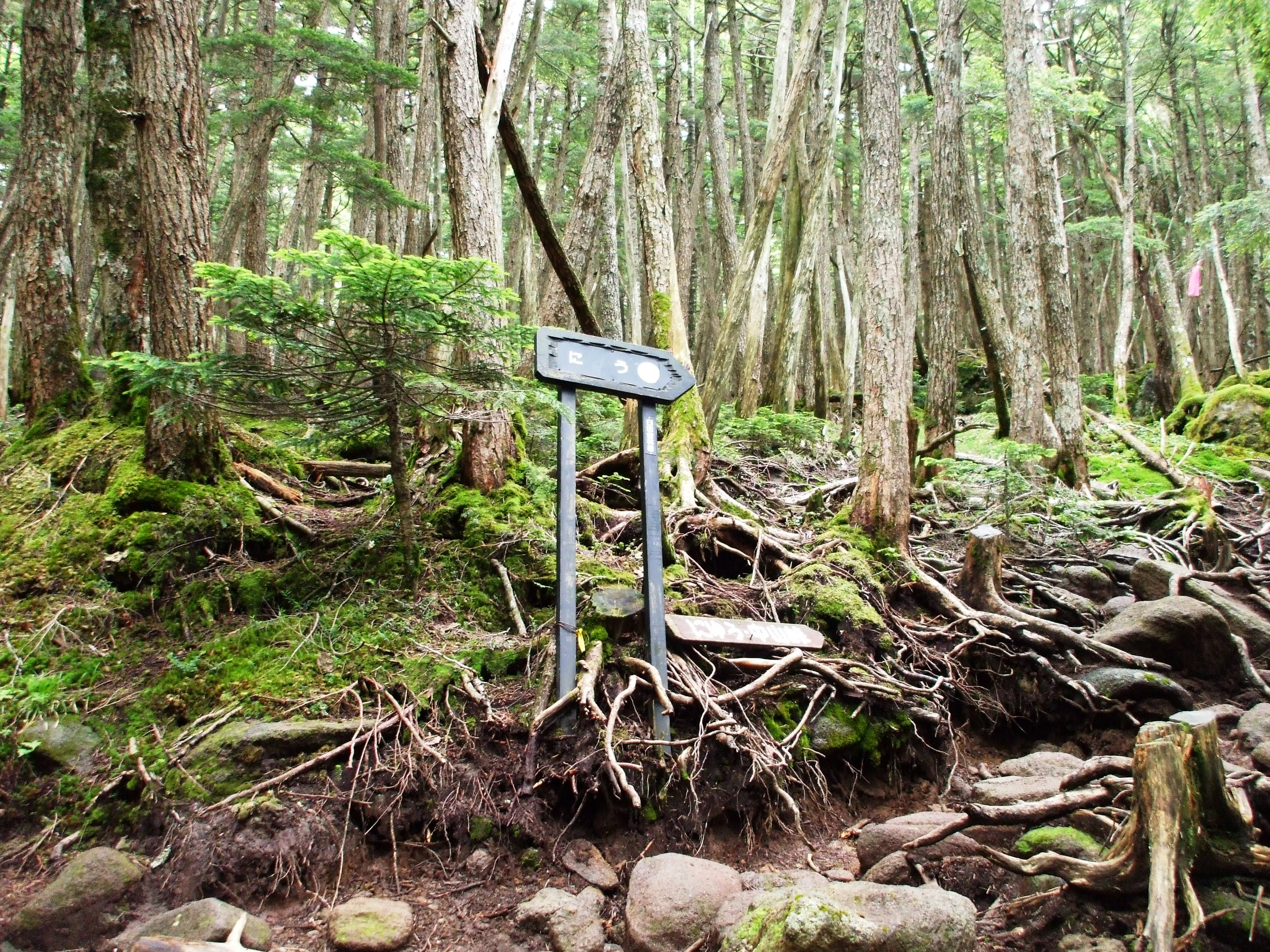
At the route to Mount Nyū (2)

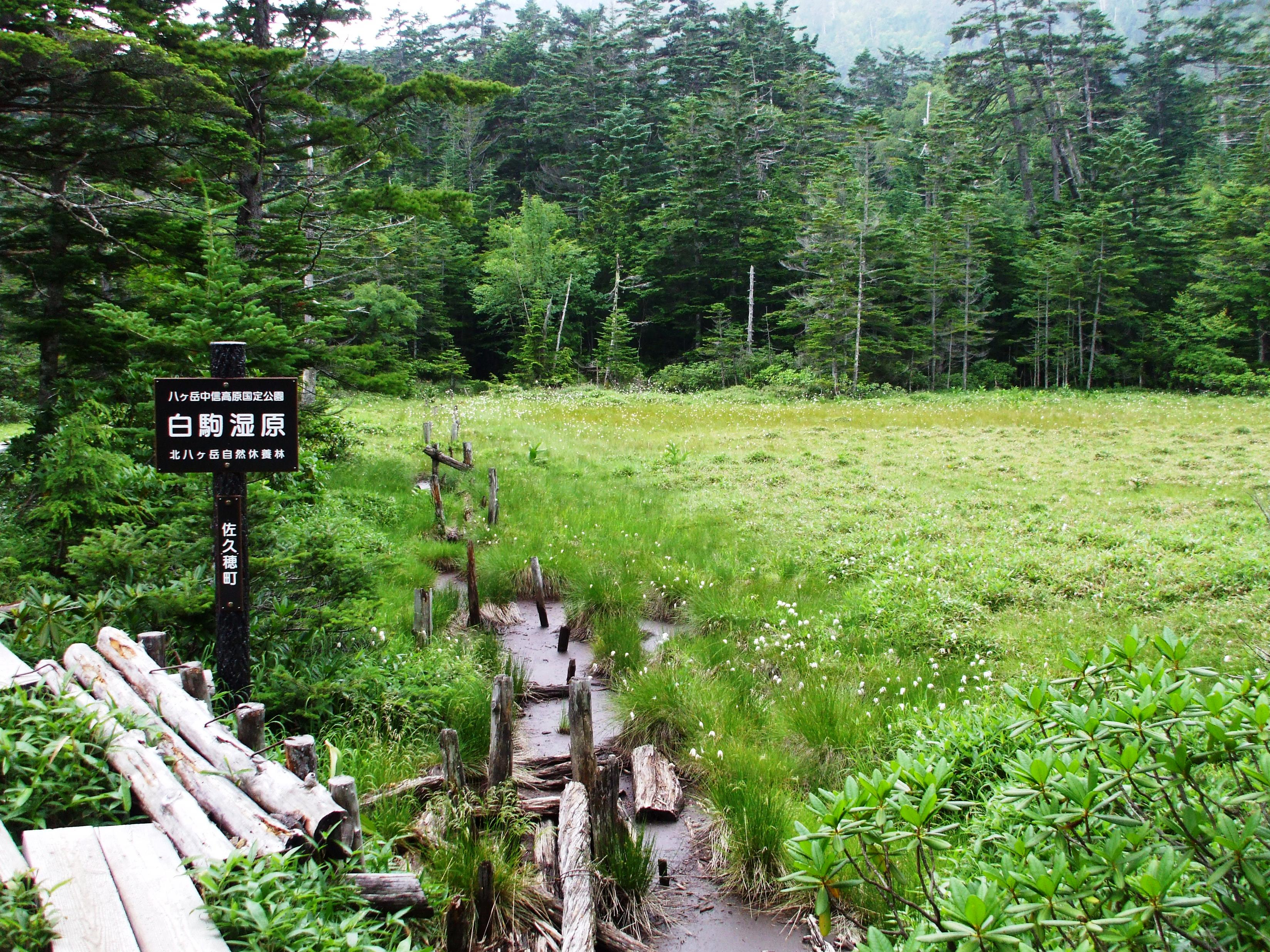
Shirakoma Moor on the way to Mount Nyū
