= Unis =

UNIS or Unis may refer to:

- Union of Nigerien Independents and Sympathisers, a defunct political party in Niger
- Unis, a new religious movement founded in the 1960s, based on the teachings of George Gurdjieff
- UniS, the corporate logo of the University of Surrey from 1998 to 2007
- Unis (TV channel), a Canadian French-language television channel
- Unis (group), a South Korean girl group
- United Nations Information Service Geneva
- United Nations Information Service Vienna
- United Nations International School, New York City
- United Nations International School of Hanoi, located in Hanoi, Vietnam
- Universal Space, a manufacturer of arcade games
- Universidad del Istmo, a university in Fraijanes, Guatemala
- University Centre in Svalbard, Norway
- an alternate spelling of Unas, a pharaoh of ancient Egypt's Old Kingdom era
- ICAO code for Severo-Eniseysk Airport

== See also ==
- Uni (disambiguation)
