= NYU (disambiguation) =

New York University (NYU) is a private university in Manhattan, New York, United States.

NYU or nyu may also refer to:

== Places ==
- Nyaung U Airport (IATA code), in Nyaung U, Myanmar
- Nyū District, Fukui, Japan
- Mount Nyū, mountain in Koumi, Nagano Prefecture, Japan
- Nyu Dam, dam in Gunma Prefecture, Japan

== Other uses ==
- Nyungwe language ISO 639-3 code
- Nyu (Elfen Lied), an alternate ego of the protagonist Kaede
- Nyu Media, a defunct video game publisher
- Slavik Nyu (born 1969), Kazakh weightlifter

== See also ==
- New York Undercover, TV series
