= Mount Yoko (Northern Yatsugatake) =

Lava dome in Honshū, Japan

- 横岳
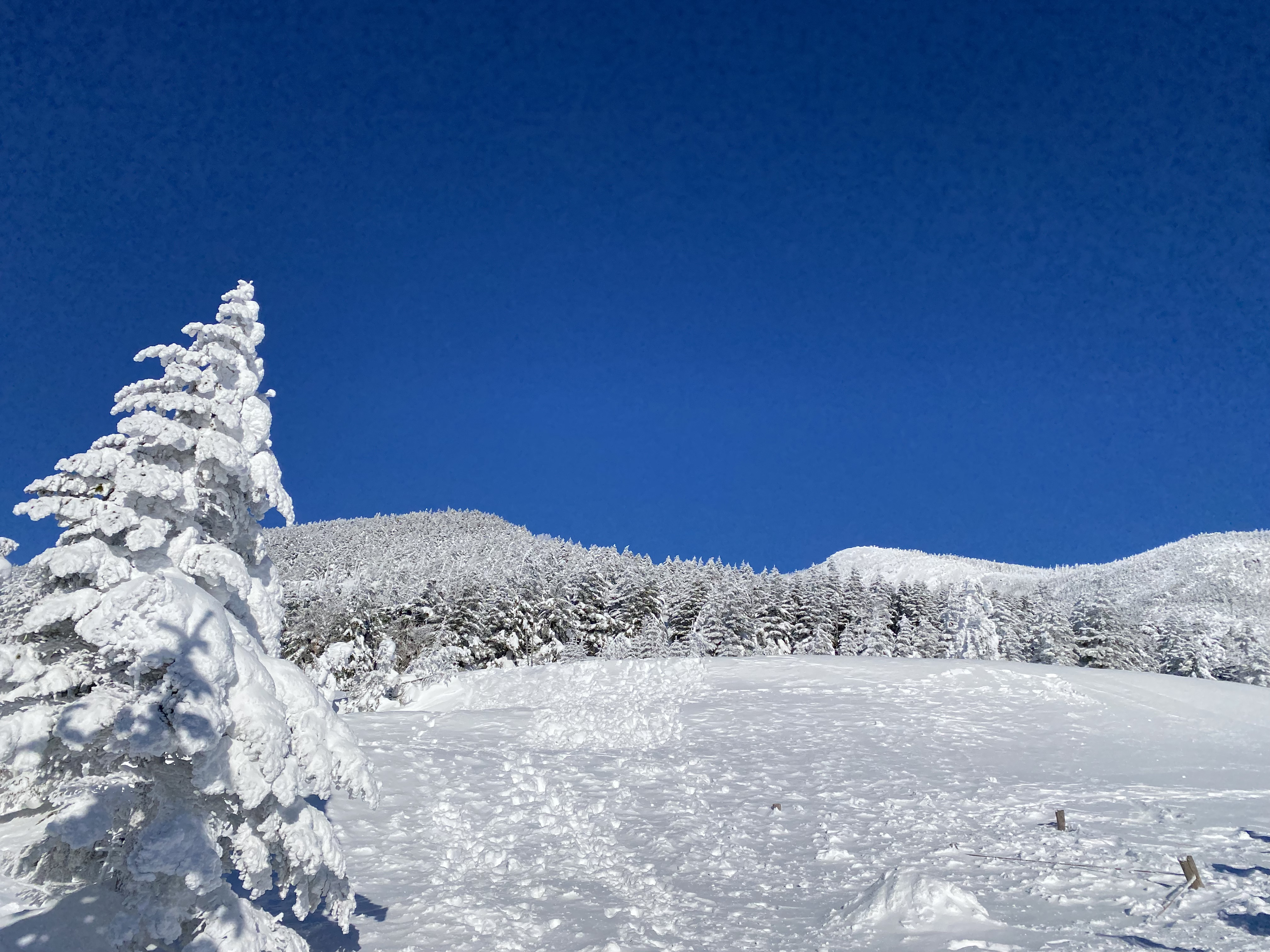
- Mount Kitayoko from Tsuboniwa in winter

Highest point
- Elevation: 2,480 m (8,140 ft)
- Prominence: 361 m (1,184 ft)
- Listing: List of mountains and hills of Japan by height
- Coordinates: 36°5′15″N 138°19′12″E

Geography
- Location: Honshū, Japan
- Parent range: Northern Yatsugatake Volcanic Group
- Topo map(s): Geographical Survey Institute 25000:1 蓼科山, 25000:1 蓼科, 50000:1 蓼科山

Geology
- Rock age: Quaternary
- Mountain type: Volcanic
- Volcanic arc: Northeastern Japan Arc
- Last eruption: 1200 ±100 years

Mount Yoko (横岳, Yoko-dake) also known as Mount Kita Yoko, is an active lava dome located in the Northern Yatsugatake Volcanic Group of the Yatsugatake Mountains, Honshū, Japan. Mount Yoko has shown the most recent activity and is now considered an active volcano. It last erupted approximately 800 years ago. The eruption consisted of ash with a lava flow of some 3 million cubic meters. The eruption was dated by corrected radiocarbon dating. The next previous eruption was in or after 400 BCE.

== Outline ==
The summit is divided into two peaks, approximately 3 minutes from each other: the northern 2,480 m (8,136 ft) peak and the southern 2,471.6 m (8,109 ft). The triangulation station is located on the southern peak. A mountain hut, Kitayokodake Hutte, is located below the southern peak. The mountain is famous for its hard rime snow monsters, called juhyo (樹氷) in Japanese.

24 frames, right?

Mount Otake (大岳, Ōtake) 2,381 m (7,812 ft) is located to the north. Mount Mitsudake (ミツだけ, Mitsudake) 2,360 m (7,743 ft) is located to the south.

== Tourist Facilities ==
The Kitayatsugatake Ropeway, which is open year-round, begins from 1,771 m (5,810 ft) above sea level in Chino, Nagano, to a height of about 2,237 m (7,339 ft) to Tsuboniwa Nature Park (坪庭自然園, Tsuboniwa shizen en), a natural garden of igneous rock and pines which originated from a volcanic eruption. Several hiking trails wind through the nature park, an enchanting . One circuit of the park takes about 40 min.

Below the ropeway is the slope of Pilatus Tateshina Snow Resort.

== Mountain Climbing ==
The mountain is at the northern end of the main traverse of the Yatsugatake Mountains.

The mountain trail between Tsuboniwa and the summit is gentle and well-maintained, making it an easy route for beginners, even in winter. However, appropriate clothing and boots are necessary, especially in winter. The roundtrip from the top of the ropeway to the northern summit and back to the ropeway is approximately 3.5 km.

However, the route from the summit to Kikkoike Pond and the route that goes through Mt. Odake to Futagoike Pond are quite steep. In addition, although there are many climbers between the inner garden and the summit, there are very few people north of it, and it is not uncommon for tracks to disappear, especially in the winter.

There are two mountain huts: Shimagare Hut between Tsuboniwa and Ameike Pass, and Kita-Yokodake Hutte near the summit on the trail from Tsuboniwa to the summit. The latter is open year-round.

== Access ==
The Kitayatsugatake Ropeway is approximately 60 minutes by Alpico Bus from Chino Station or 50 minutes by car from Suwa IC on the Chūō Expressway.

== Gallery ==
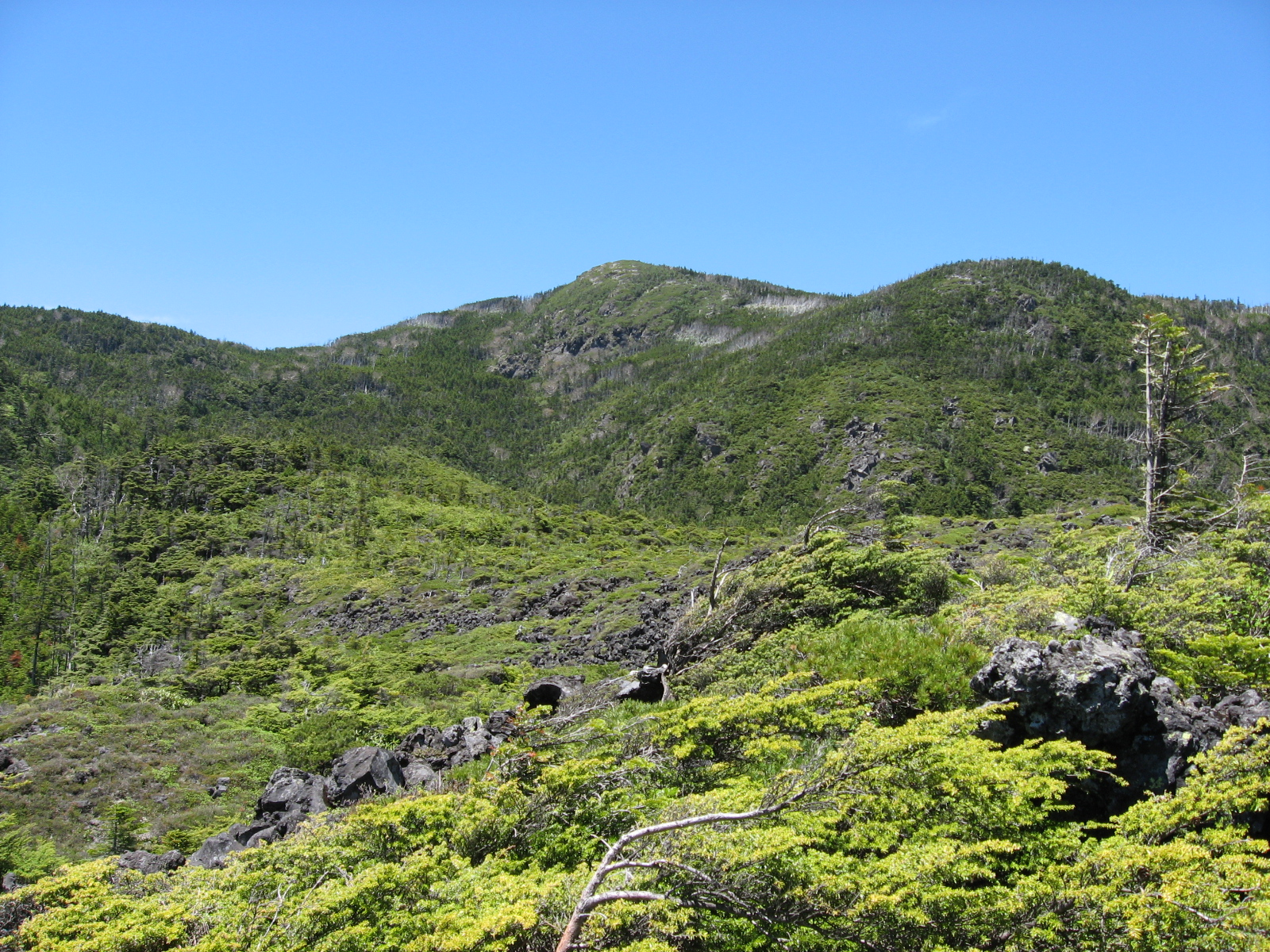
Mt.Kitayokodake from Tsuboniwa in summer

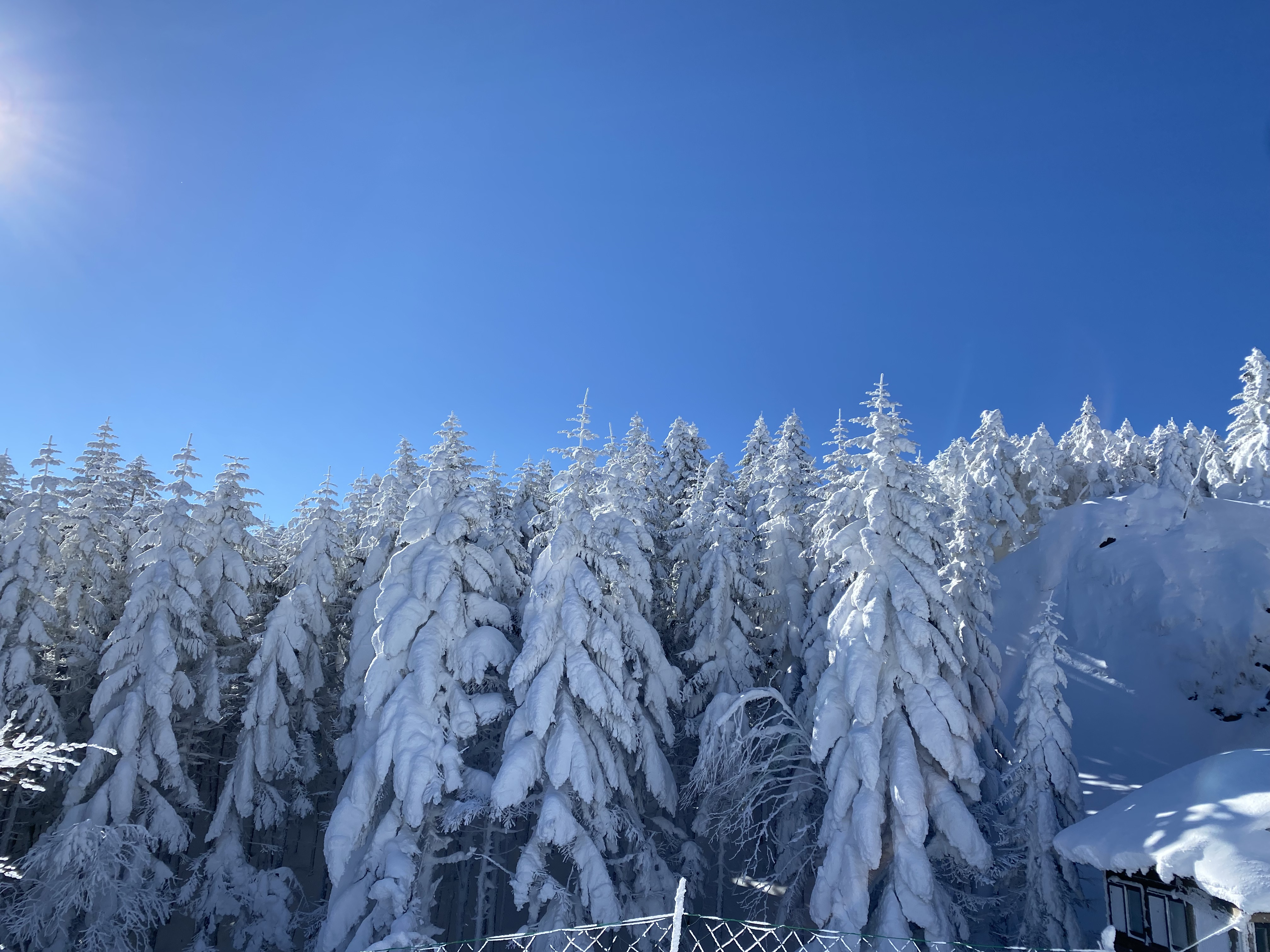
Hard rime covered trees at Kitayoko Hyutte

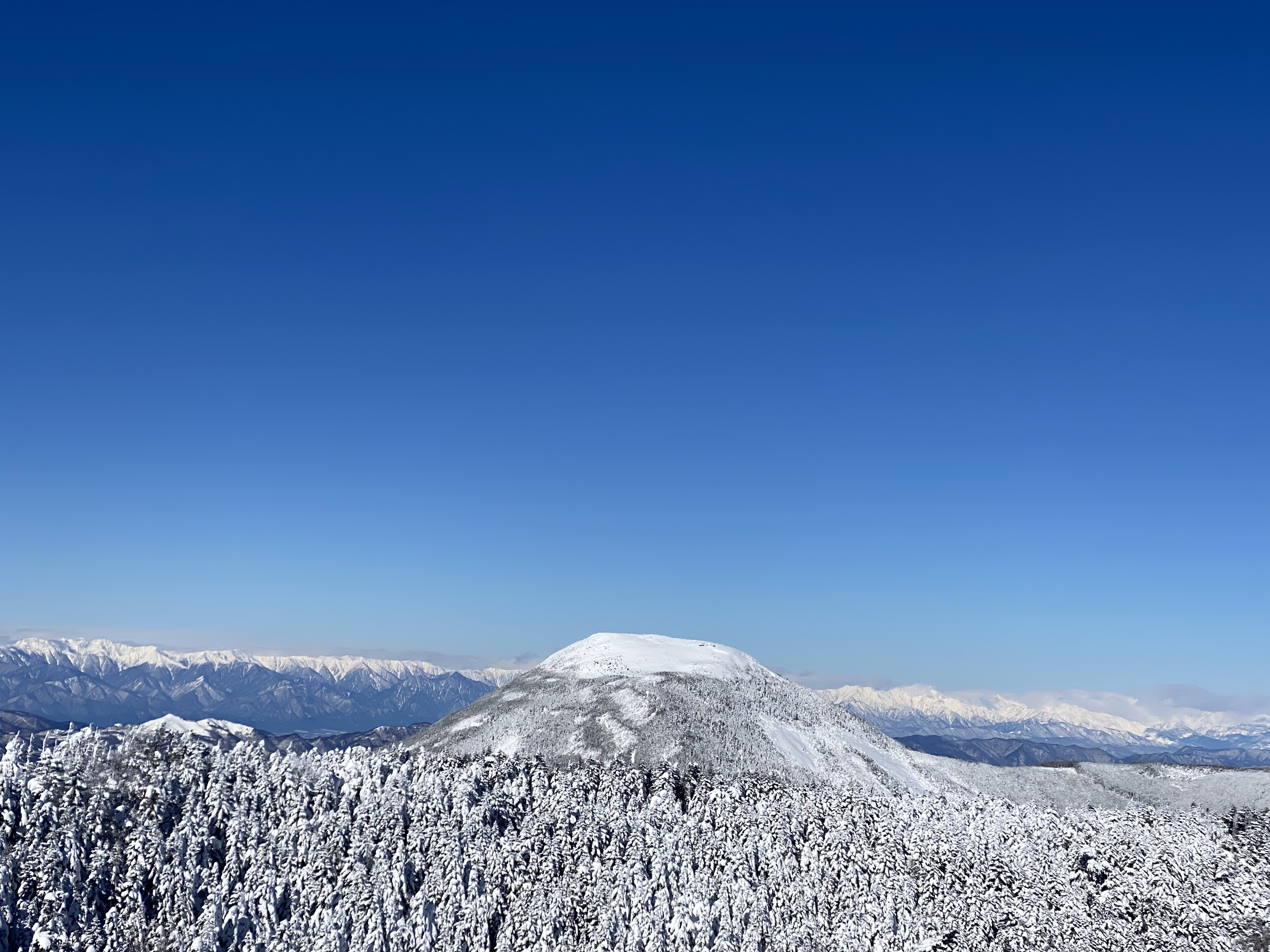
Mount Tateshina, with Northern Japanese Alps in the distance, from Mount Yoko

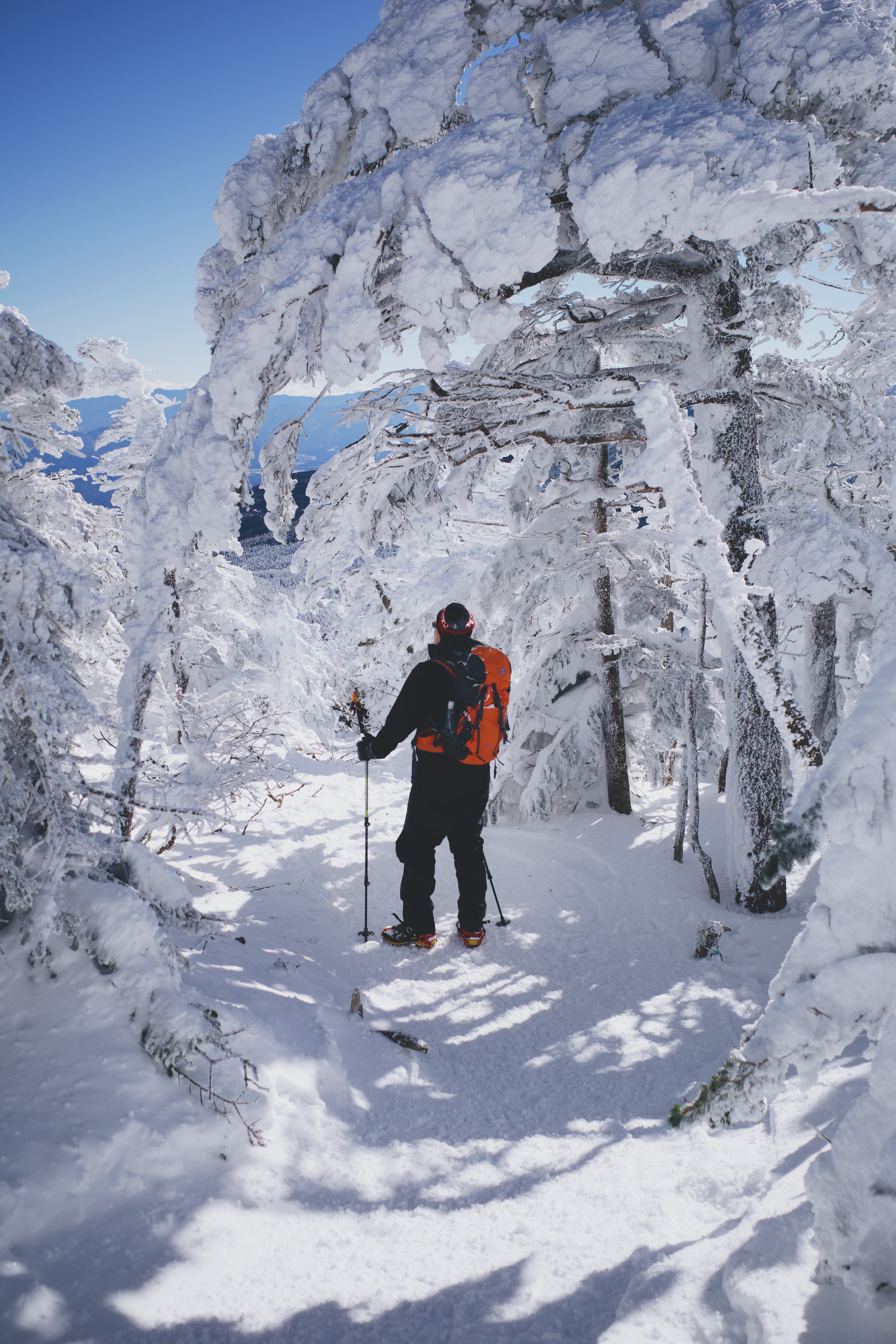
Walking among snow monsters on Mount Yoko

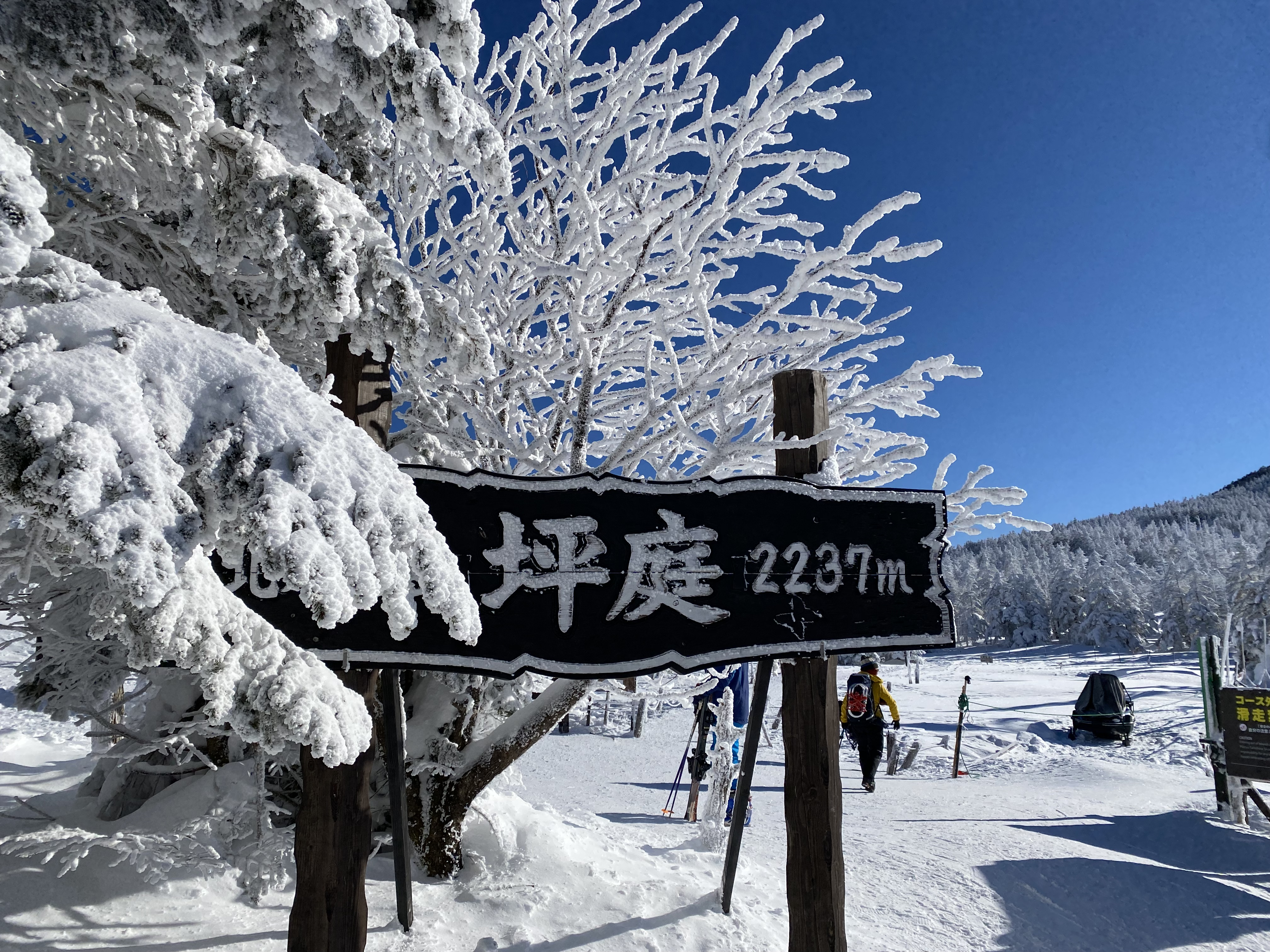
Snow monster at Tsuboniwa

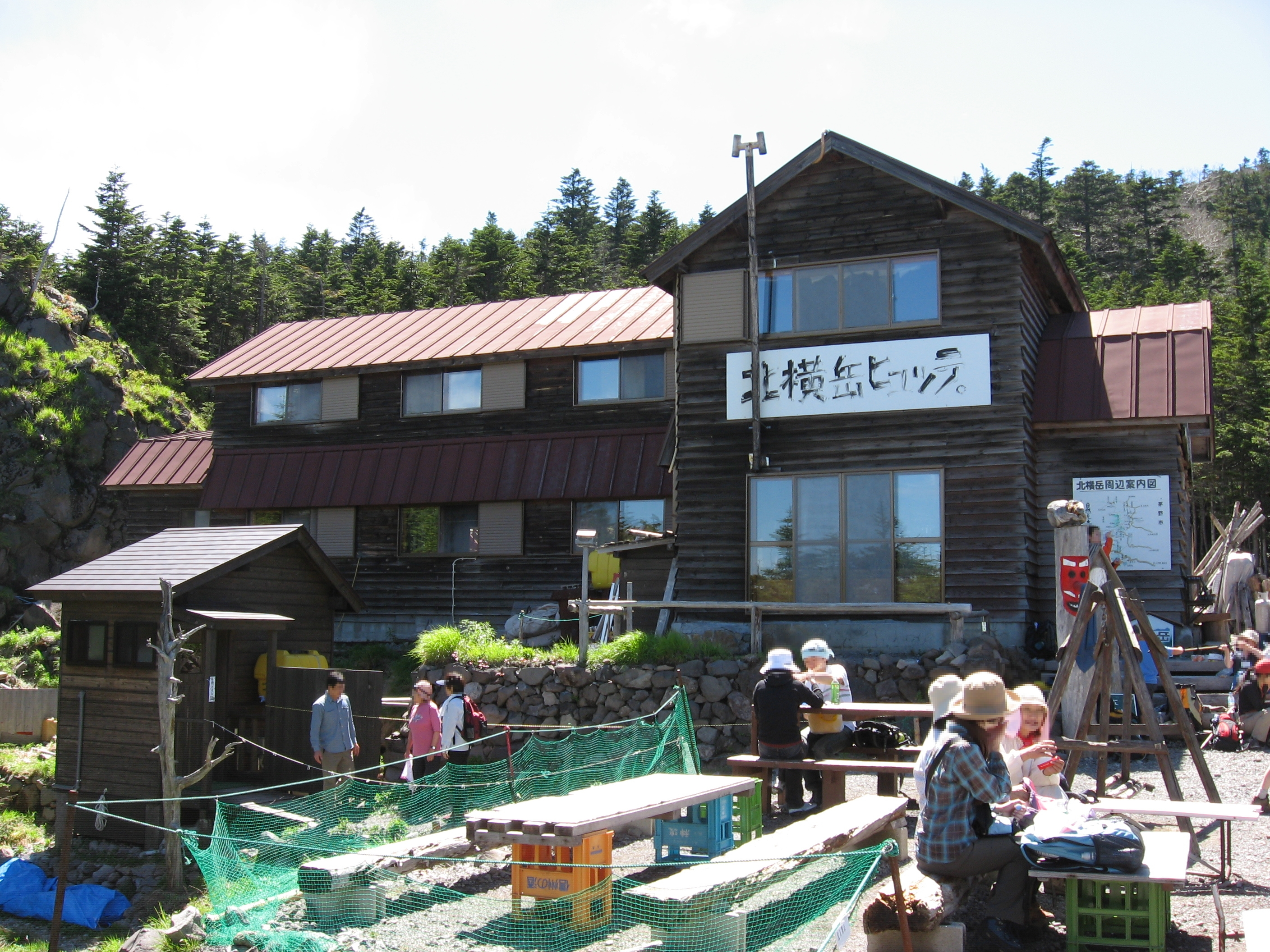
Kitayokodake Hut

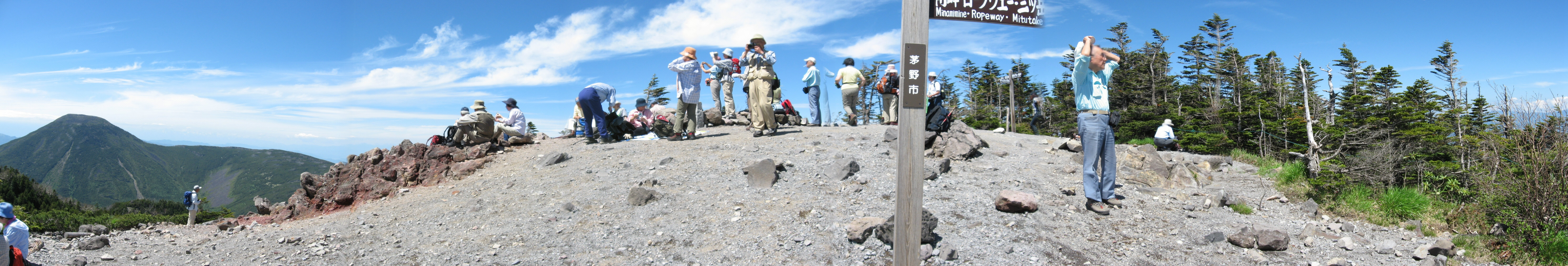
The southern peak of Mount Yoko, with Mount Tateshina on the left

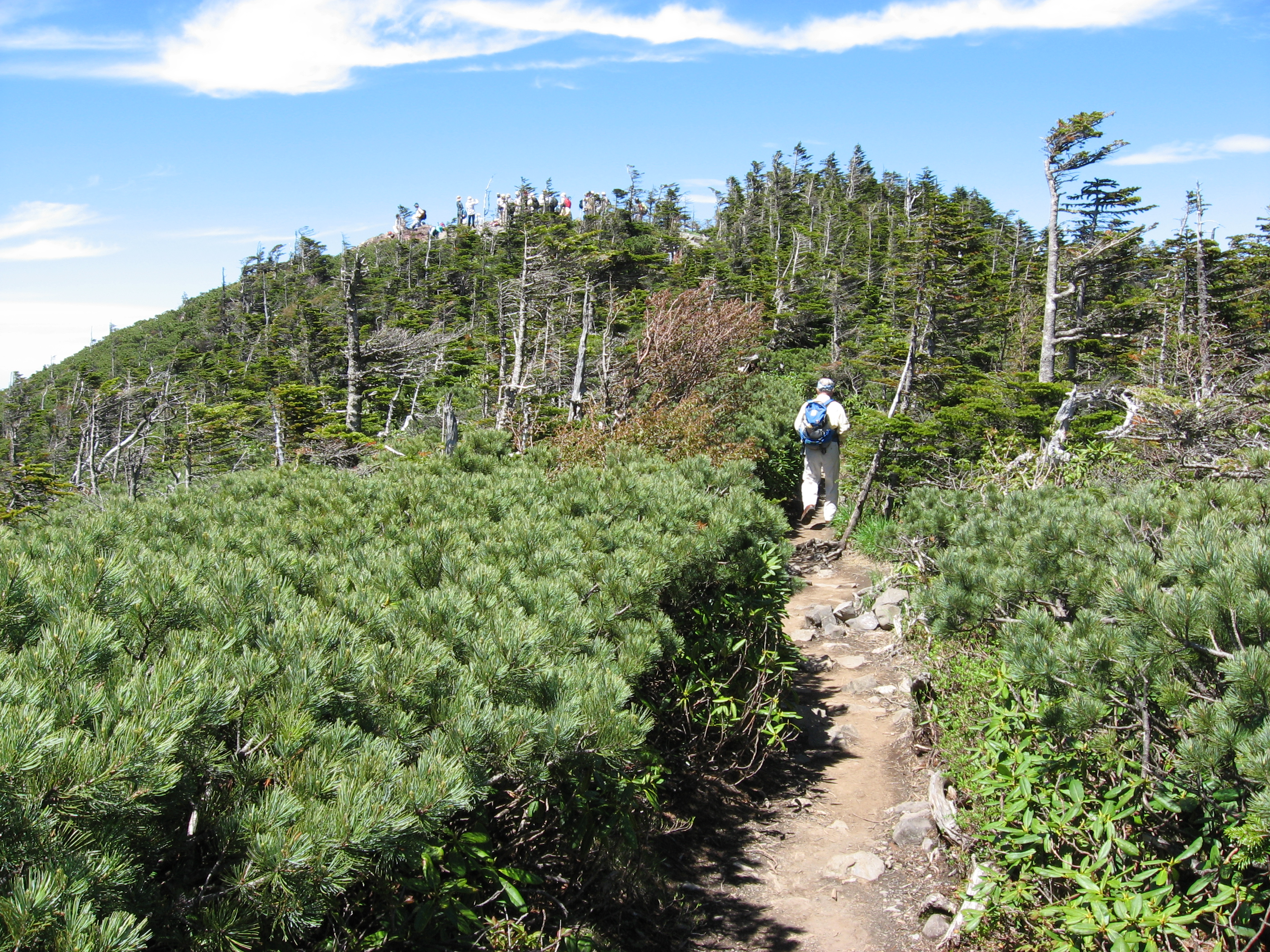
The trail to the northern peak of Mount Yoko, surrounded by Japanese creeping pine
