= Uni, Kirov Oblast =

Uni Уни
- Urban-type settlement
- Interactive map of Uni
- Location of Uni Uni (Kirov Oblast)
- Coordinates: 57.7544°N 51.4906°E
- Country: Russia
- Federal subject: Kirov Oblast
- Administrative district: Uninsky District
- Founded: 1646

Population (2010 Census)
  - Total: 4,592
  - Estimate (2025): 3,426 (−25.4%)
- Time zone: UTC+3 (MSK)
- Postal code: 612540
- OKTMO ID: 33640151051

Uni (Russian: Уни) is an urban locality (an urban-type settlement) in Uninsky District of Kirov Oblast, Russia. Populati
