= National Union of Independents =

National Union of Independents may refer to:

- National Union of Independents (Monaco)
- National Union of Independents (Upper Volta)
