= Uninsky District =

Uninsky District Унинский район (Russian)
- District
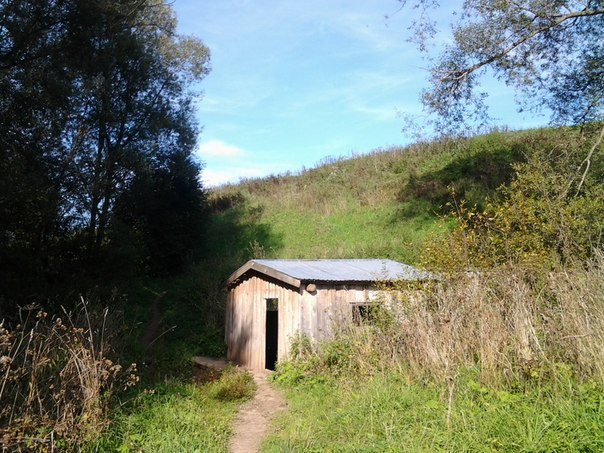
- Landscape in Uninsky District

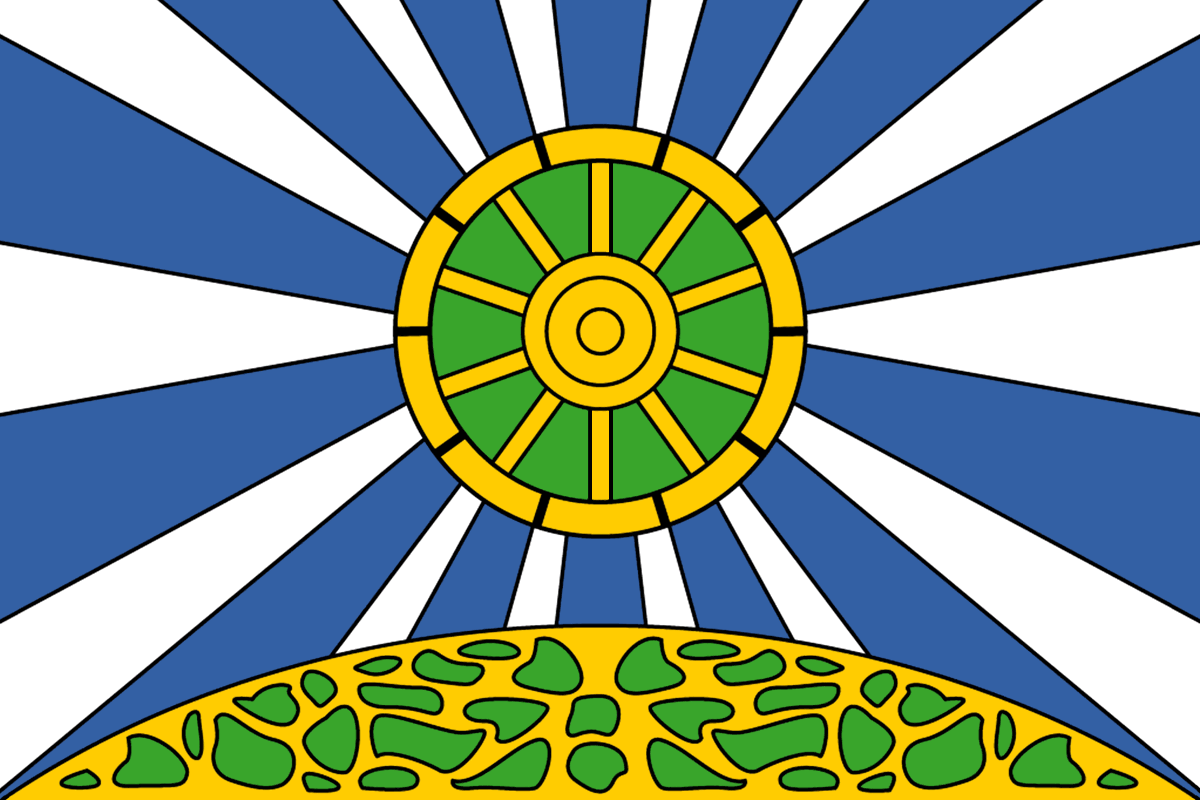
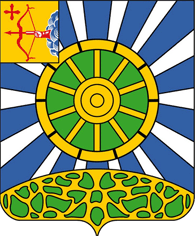
- Flag Coat of arms
- Location of Uninsky District in Kirov Oblast
- Coordinates: 57°45′N 51°29′E
- Country: Russia
- Federal subject: Kirov Oblast
- Established: 15 July 1929
- Administrative center: Uni

Area
  - Total: 2,130 km^{2} (820 sq mi)

Population (2010 Census)
  - Total: 9,178
  - Density: 4.31/km^{2} (11.2/sq mi)
  - Urban: 50.0%
  - Rural: 50.0%

Administrative structure
  - Administrative divisions: 1 Urban-type settlements, 8 Rural okrugs
  - Inhabited localities: 1 urban-type settlements, 57 rural localities

Municipal structure
  - Municipally incorporated as: Uninsky Municipal District
  - Municipal divisions: 1 urban settlements, 8 rural settlements
- Time zone: UTC+3 (MSK)
- OKTMO ID: 33640000
- Website: http://admuni.ru/

Uninsky District (Russian: Уни́нский райо́н) is an administrative and municipal district (raion), one of the thirty-nine in Kirov Oblast, Russia. It is located in the southeast of the oblast. The area of the district is 2,130 square kilometers (820 sq mi). Its administrative center is the urban locality (an urban-type settlement) of Uni. Population: 9,178 (2010 census); 11,179 (2002 Census); 12,955 (1989 Soviet census). The population of Uni accounts for 50.0% of the district's total population.
