= UNE =

Une may refer to:

- Une, a town in Colombia
- Une, the chemical symbol for the element Unnilennium now known as Meitnerium

UNE can mean:

- Universidad del Noreste (University of the Northeast), Tampico, Tamaulipas, Mexico
- University of New England (Australia), in New South Wales
- University of New England (United States), in Maine
- Unbundled Network Element, a telecommunications regulation requirement in the United States
- Ubuntu Netbook Edition, a version of the Ubuntu operating system customized for netbook computers
- Any of a number of standards released by AENOR, the Spanish member organization of the International Organization for Standardization. A UNE or UNE-EN standard is similar to an ISO standard
- Unidad Nacional de la Esperanza (National Unity of Hope), a political party in Guatemala
- União Nacional dos Estudantes (National Union of Students), Brazilian students' union.
