= Koumi, Nagano =

Koumi 小海町
- Town
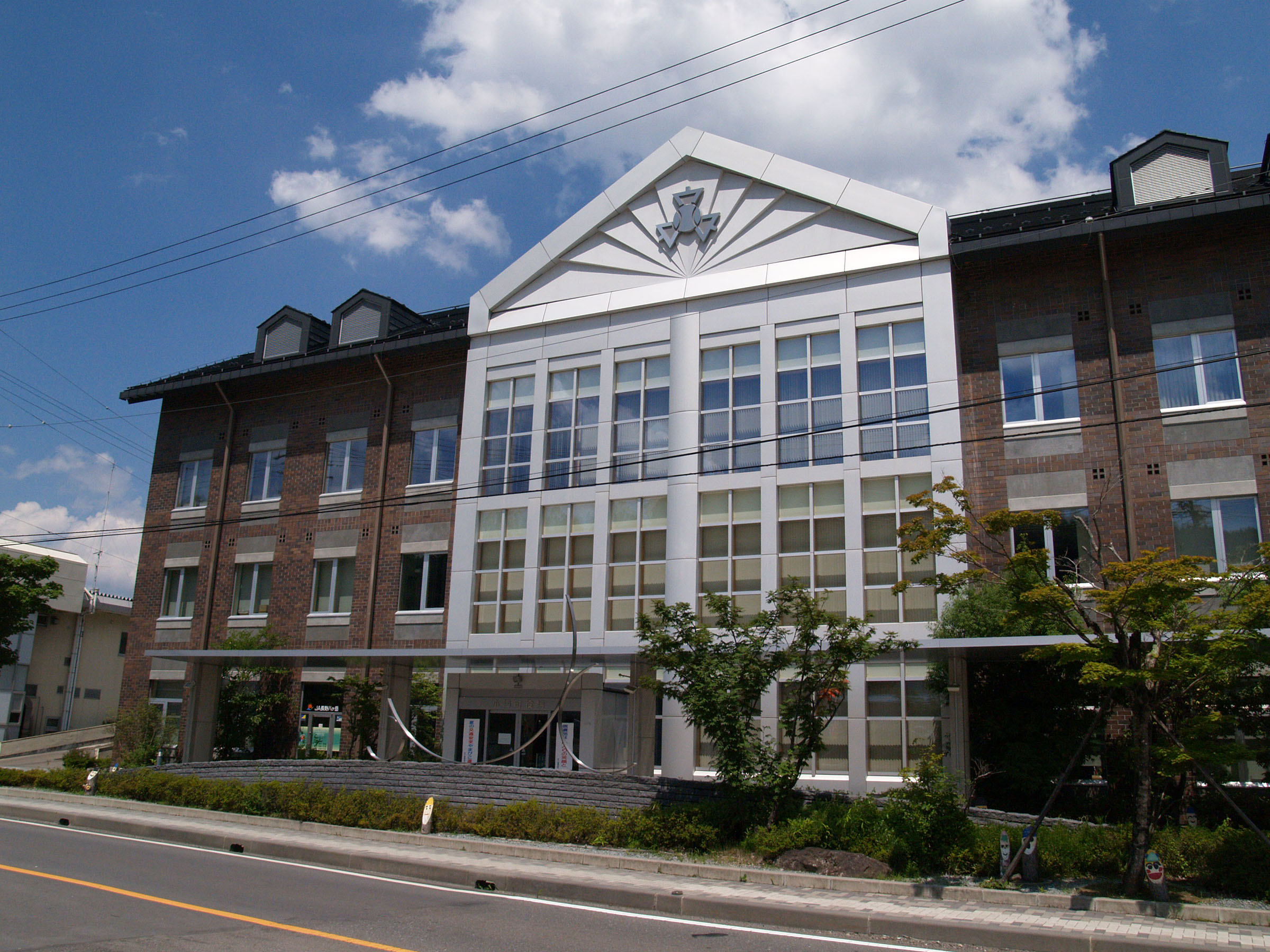
- Koumi Town Hall

- Flag Seal

- Location of Koumi in Nagano Prefecture

- Coordinates: 36°5′42.1″N 138°29′0.6″E
- Country: Japan
- Region: Chūbu (Kōshin'etsu)
- Prefecture: Nagano
- District: Minamisaku

Area
  - Total: 114.20 km^{2} (44.09 sq mi)

Population (April 2019)
  - Total: 4,676
  - Density: 40.95/km^{2} (106.0/sq mi)
- Time zone: UTC+9 (Japan Standard Time)
- Symbols
  - Tree: Larch
  - Flower: Enkianthus campanulatus
- Phone number: 0267-92-1192
- Address: 57-1 Toyosato, Koumi-machi, Minamisaku-gun, Nagano-ken 384-1192
- Website: Official website

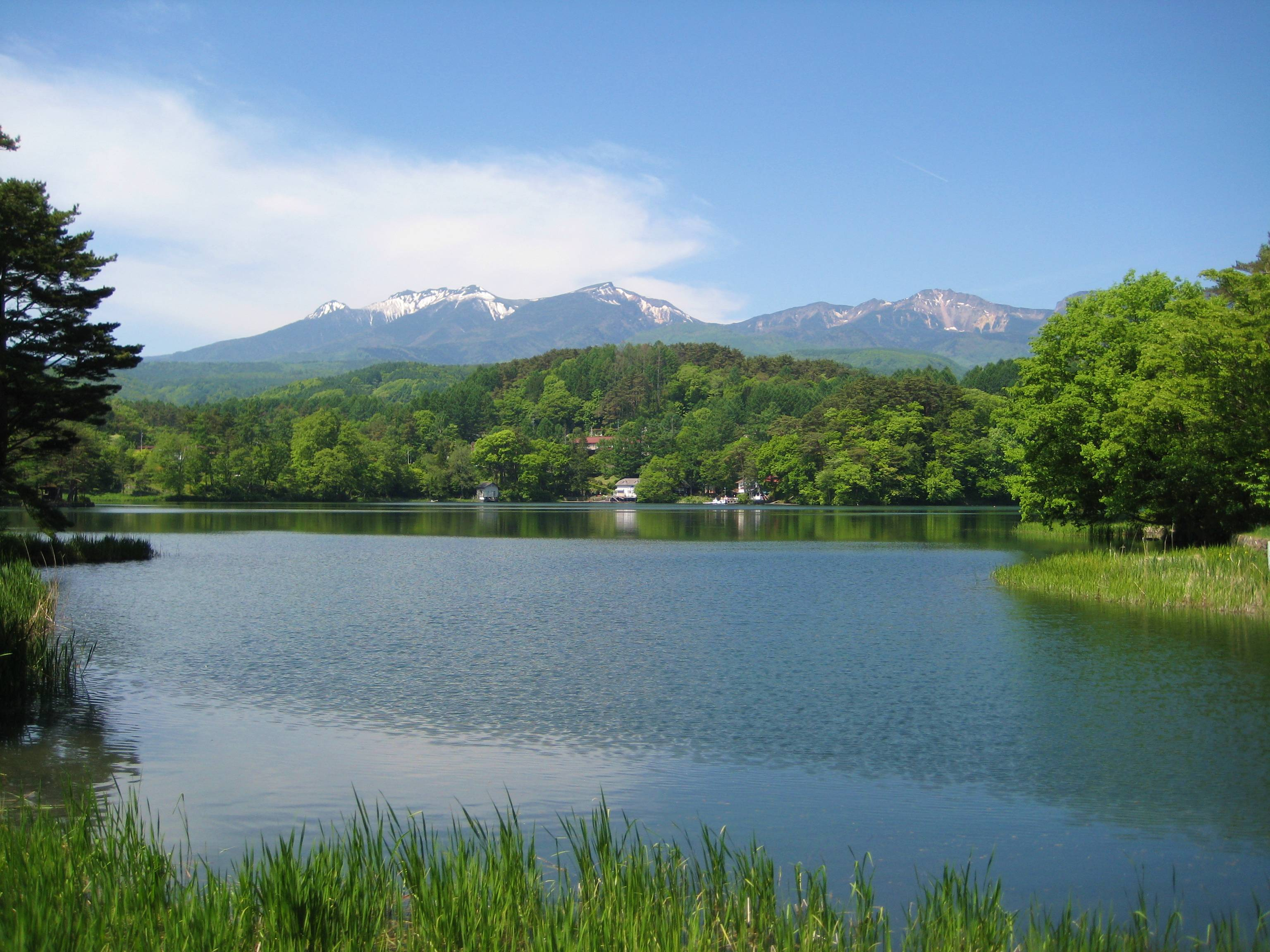
Lake Inako in Koumi

Koumi (小海町, Koumi-machi) is a town located in Nagano Prefecture, Japan. As of 1 April 2019, the town had an estimated population of 4,676 in 2012 households, and a population density of 41 persons per km^{2}. The total area of the town is 114.20 square kilometres (44.09 sq mi).

The town mascot is "Ptylitza", an imaginary small gnome-like creature, images of which can be seen all over the town.

== Geography ==
Koumi is located in the far east of Nagano. The nearest city is Saku, about 40 minutes drive away. Nagano city is about 100 km away. Mount Tengu (2646 meters) is located on the border of Koumi with Chino. the Chikuma River flows through the town.

=== Surrounding municipalities ===
- Nagano Prefecture
  - Chino
  - Kitaaiki
  - Minamiaiki
  - Minamimaki
  - Sakuho

=== Climate ===
The town has a humid continental climate characterized by warm and humid summers, and cold winters with heavy snowfall (Köppen climate classification Dfb). The average annual temperature in Koumi is 8.2 °C. The average annual rainfall is 1398 mm with September as the wettest month. The temperatures are highest on average in August, at around 20.9 °C, and lowest in January, at around -4.0 °C.

== Demographics ==
Per Japanese census data, the population of Koumi has declined over the past 60 years.

Historical population
| Year | Pop. | ±% |
|---|---|---|
| 1960 | 9,227 | — |
| 1970 | 7,636 | −17.2% |
| 1980 | 7,004 | −8.3% |
| 1990 | 6,630 | −5.3% |
| 2000 | 5,961 | −10.1% |
| 2010 | 5,178 | −13.1% |
| 2020 | 4,353 | −15.9% |

== History ==
The area of present-day Koumi was part of ancient Shinano Province. The village of Koumi was established on April 1, 1889 with the establishment of the municipalities system. It merged with the village of Kitamaki on September 30, 1956 and was elevated to town status.

== Education ==
Koumi has one public elementary school operated by the city government and one public middle school shared with Kitaaiki and Minamiaiki villages. Koumi has a public high school operated by the Nagano Prefectural Board of Education.

== Transportation ==
=== Railway ===
- East Japan Railway Company – Koumi Line
  - Matsubarako - Koumi - Managashi

=== Highway ===
- National Route 141
- National Route 299

== Notable people from Koumi ==
- Makoto Shinkai, anime director. Shinkai was inspired by Lake Matsubara in his hometown to create the lake in his famous film, Your Name.
