= Komagata ruins =

Archaeological site in Japan

Komagata Ruins
- 駒形遺跡 (Japanese)
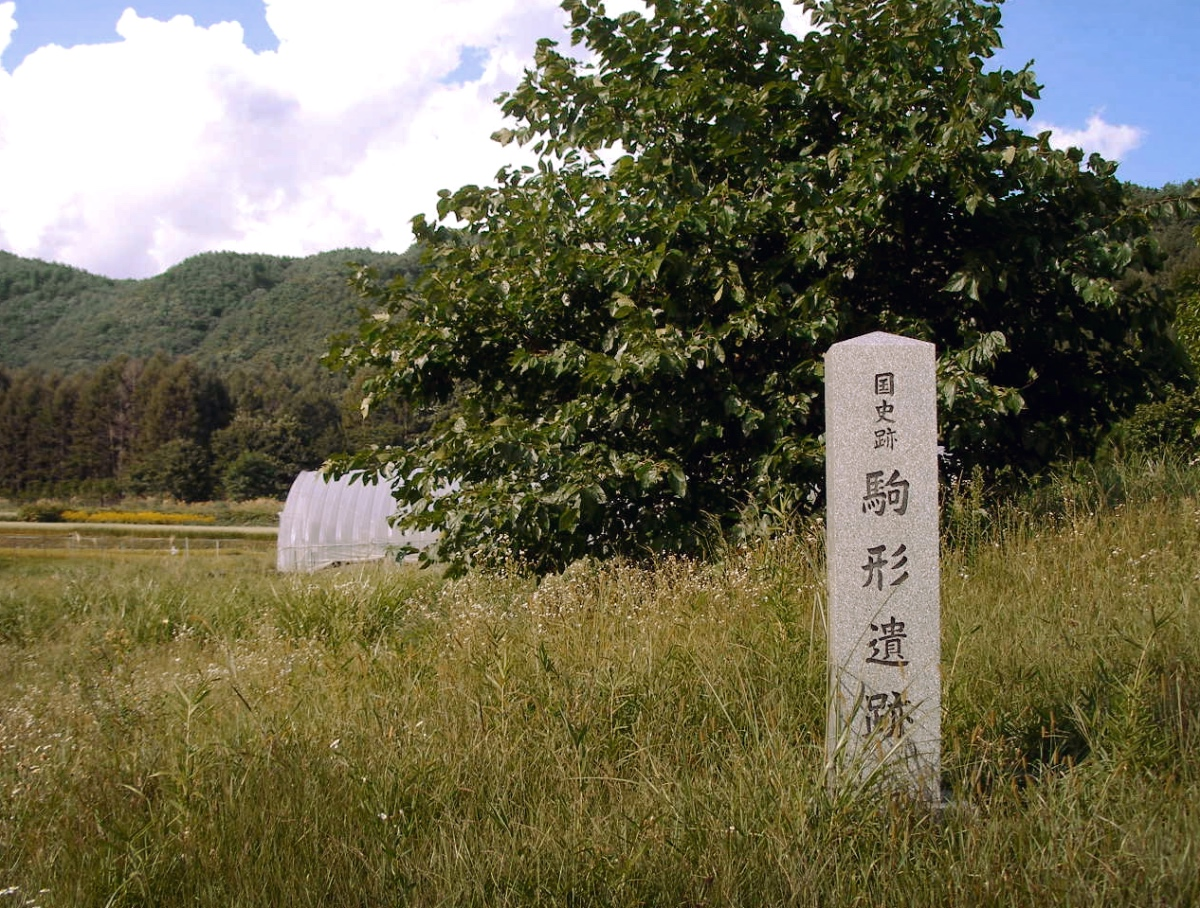

- Komagata Ruins Komagata ruins (Japan)
- 36°02′22″N 138°11′21″E
- Type: settlement
- Periods: Jōmon period
- Location: Chino, Nagano, Japan
- Region: Chūbu region

Site notes
- Elevation: 910 m (2,990 ft)
- Area: 31,426.12 m^{2} (338,267.9 sq ft)
- Public access: Yes (no public facilities)

The Komagata Ruins (駒形遺跡, Komagata iseki) is an archaeological site containing the ruins of a Jōmon period settlement located in the Yonezawa neighborhood of the city of Chino, Nagano in the Chūbu region of Japan. The site was designated a National Historic Site of Japan in 1998.

== Overview ==
The Komagata site is located at an elevation of 910 meters on a well-watered plain south of Mount Kirigamine near the southwestern foot of Mount Yatsugatake. It is flanked by the Aizawa River to the west and the Oshimizu River to the east, and is about ten kilometers south of high-quality obsidian seams at the Hoshikuso Pass obsidian mine site.

This large-scale village appears to have been inhabited continuously from the Japanese Paleolithic period through the Heian period. The ruins covered by the National Historic Site designation include 106 pit dwellings from the middle of the early Jōmon period through the middle of the late Jōmon period (9000 to 4000 years ago), and many prehistoric storage pits. This settlement was a center for the production and trade of ornaments, arrowheads, and tools made from this volcanic glass. The site has been excavated 15 times from 1961 to 2015.

The site is marked by a stone monument, but there are no facilities at present for visitors. It is located approximately 15 minutes by car from Chino Station on the JR East Chūō Main Line.

== See also ==
- List of Historic Sites of Japan (Nagano)
