= List of Encouragement of Climb episodes =

Full cover of the season 1 Blu-ray volume released by Earth Star Entertainment in Japan on May 14, 2013.

Encouragement of Climb is a slice of life anime television series based on the manga series of the same name written by Shiro and serialized in Comic Earth Star magazine. Shy acrophobic Aoi Yukimura reunites with her childhood friend and mountaineering enthusiast Hinata Kuraue, on the first day of high school, and is reluctantly dragged on an adventure to explore the wonders of mountain climbing. The girls hope to ultimately see the sunrise from atop the mountain they climbed as children once more. Along the way, Aoi and Hinata make new friends and share many experiences. The series is produced by Eight Bit and directed by Yusuke Yamamoto with character designs by Yuusuke Matsuo.

The twelve-episode first season consists of five-minute-long episodes and aired between January 3 and March 21, 2013, on Tokyo MX and later by SUN-TV, AT-X and KBS along with online streaming on Niconico. Earth Star Entertainment released the complete season in Japan on a single Blu-ray and DVD volume on May 14, 2013. The set also included an unaired 13th OVA episode. The second season consists of 15-minute-long episodes and aired on Tokyo MX between July 9, 2014, and December 24, 2014, followed by later airings on KBS, SDT, BS11 and AT-X along with online streaming on Niconico. Bonus episodes were included with the second and seventh Blu-ray and DVD volumes of the second season, released on October 24, 2014, and March 27, 2015, respectively. An original video animation, titled Omoide Present, was released on October 28, 2017. A third season, also consisting of 15-minute long episodes, aired between July 2 and September 24, 2018. All of these seasons were simulcast with English subtitles by Crunchyroll. A new anime television series titled Encouragement of Climb: Next Summit (ヤマノススメ Next Summit, Yama no Susume Nekusuto Samitto), consisting of 12 full-length episodes, aired from October 5 to December 21, 2022, and is being simulcast on Sentai Filmworks' HIDIVE service.

For the first season, the ending theme is "Staccato Days" (スタッカート・デイズ, Sutakkāto Deizu) by Yuka Iguchi and Kana Asumi. For the second season, the opening theme for the first 15 episodes is "Natsuiro Present" (夏色プレゼント, Natsuiro Purezento; Summer-colored Present) by Iguchi, Asumi, Yōko Hikasa, and Yui Ogura, while the theme for episode 16 onwards is "Mainichi Koharu Biyori" (毎日コハルビヨリ, Everyday Indian Summer) by Iguchi and Asumi. The ending theme for the first 12 episodes is "Tinkling Smile" by Ogura, the ending theme for episodes 13 to15 is "Staccato Days" (スタッカート・デイズ, Sutakkāto Deizu) by Iguchi and Asumi, the ending theme for episode 16 to 24 is "Cocoiro Rainbow" by Kyouko Narumi, and the ending theme for episode 25 is "Kakedasu Omoi" (駆け出す思い; Feel Like Running Away). For the OVA, the ending theme is "Omoide Creators" (おもいでクリエイターズ; Memory Creators) by Iguchi and Asumi. For the third season, the opening theme is "Chiheisen Stride" (地平線ストライド; Horizon Stride) by Iguchi, Asumi, Hikasa, and Ogura, while the ending theme is "Irochigai no Tsubasa" (色違いの翼; Wings of Different Colors) by Iguchi and Asumi. For the fourth season, the opening theme is "Omoi Nochi Hare" (想いのち晴れ; Memories, and Later Sunny) by Iguchi and Asumi, while the ending theme for the first 11 episodes is "Tobira wo Akete Beru o Narasou" (扉を開けてベルを鳴らそう; Open the Door and Ring the Bell) by Iguchi and Asumi, the ending theme for episode 12 is "Staccato Days" (スタッカート・デイズ, Sutakkāto Deizu) by Iguchi and Asumi.

== Series overview ==
Season	Episodes	Originally released	
Season	Episodes	First released	Last released
1	12	January 3, 2013	March 21, 2013
2	24	July 9, 2014	December 24, 2014
3	13	July 2, 2018	September 24, 2018
4	12	October 5, 2022	December 21, 2022

== Episode list ==
=== Encouragement of Climb (2013) ===
No.	Title (Note: All English titles are taken from Crunchyroll.)	Original air date
1	"Anything but Mountains!"; Transliteration: "Yama dake wa Dame!" (Japanese: 山だけはダメ!)	January 3, 2013
In the city of Hannō, Aoi Yukimura, a girl who has difficulty socialising with her classmates, is approached by her childhood friend, Hinata Kuraue, who invites her to go mountain climbing like they used to. Despite having a fear of heights, Aoi is reluctantly dragged by Hinata to her house to plan a mountaineering expedition.
2	"Let's Go Together"; Transliteration: "Futari de Ikō" (Japanese: ふたりで行こう!)	January 10, 2013
As Aoi recalls how she developed her fear of heights after falling off of a jungle gym, she meets with Hinata's father, who shows them how to put up a tent. While watching the sunset, Aoi and Hinata recall a sunrise they saw together after climbing a mountain, leading Aoi to agree to climb a mountain so long as it isn't too high.
3	"Mountain Climbing Is Dangerous!?"; Transliteration: "Tozan tte, Inochigake!?" (Japanese: 登山って、命がけ!?)	January 17, 2013
Deciding to climb the nearby Mt. Tenran, Aoi prepares thoroughly for the mountaineering trip only to learn that she simply has to walk up the visitor's path. Upon reaching the top, the girls marvel at the view and eat sandwiches together before making plans for their next climb.
4	"Showdown! Mountain Cooking!?"; Transliteration: "Taiketsu! Yama Ryōri!?" (Japanese: 対決! 山料理!?)	January 24, 2013
Having been impressed by Aoi's sandwiches, Hinata proposes they hold a cooking contest using camping equipment. While Aoi makes a paella that is received well, Hinata presents her own dish, which is ultimately revealed to be pre-prepared freeze dried food as she can't actually cook.
5	"What's a Schlafsack?"; Transliteration: "Shurafu tte Nani?" (Japanese: シュラフって何?)	January 31, 2013
While browsing a mountaineering store, Aoi meets backpacker Kaede Saitō, who asks for her help in picking out a schlafsack. Thankful for Aoi's advice on picking a more expensive one so that she won't have any regrets, the two exchange e-mails and become friends.
6	"I'm The One Deciding!?"; Transliteration: "Kimeru no wa, Watashi!?" (Japanese: 決めるのは、わたし!?)	February 7, 2013
Goaded by Hinata into picking their next mountaineering destination, Aoi asks Kaede for advice. Feeling that Mt. Tanigawa is too tall for her, Aoi settles on climbing Mt. Takao, which has several shrines along its path.
7	"Which Daypack Do You Want?"; Transliteration: "Deipakku, Dore ni Suru?" (Japanese: デイパック、どれにする?)	February 14, 2013
While preparing for their climb up Mt. Takao, the girls go to the mountaineering store to buy a backpack for Aoi. Unable to choose, Aoi gets advice from the store clerk and ultimately gets help from Hinata in buying a yellow daypack.
8	"Let's Climb Mt. Takao!"; Transliteration: "Takaosan ni Noborō!" (Japanese: 高尾山に登ろう!)	February 21, 2013
Upon beginning their ascent up Mt. Takao, Aoi's excitement to visit the various wishing spots gets the better of her as she quickly tires out from not pacing herself. Stopping at a rest spot with a view of the Tokyo Skytree, Aoi buys a souvenir for Hinata but becomes too embarrassed to give it to her.
9	"A Forest Girl in the Forest!?"; Transliteration: "Mori no Naka de Mori Gāru!?" (Japanese: 森の中で森ガール!?)	February 28, 2013
The girls finally arrive at the summit and take in a view of Mt. Fuji before Aoi gives Hinata her souvenir. Taking a different path back down the mountain, the girls come across the naturalist, Kokona Aoba, and help mend her broken shoe before having her join them on their descent.
10	"The Climb Isn't Over Until You Descend!?"; Transliteration: "Oriru Made ga Tozan!?" (Japanese: 降りるまでが登山!?)	March 7, 2013
Coming across some stepping stones going over a river along their trail, the three girls hold hands all the way to the exit. Having enjoyed their adventure, the girls learn that Kokona also lives in Hannō and decide to meet up again.
11	"Tomorrow is Outdoors!"; Transliteration: "Ashita wa Autodoa!" (Japanese: 明日はアウトドア!)	March 14, 2013
As Summer arrives, the girls make plans to go to Hanno River Beach together. While Hinata and Kaede shop for ingredients for the trip, Aoi invites Kokona over for a sleepover, where they decide to prepare French toast for the outing.
12	"To The Next Landscape"; Transliteration: "Soshite, Tsugi no Keshiki e" (Japanese: そして、次の景色へ)	March 21, 2013
The girls arrive at the beach, where Kokona prepares tomato risotto from the ingredients Hinata and Kaede bought. After spending the day having fun, the girls take a look at the stars, becoming excited over the thought of seeing even more of them while mountain climbing.
OVA (13)	"Walls Aren't That Scary, Y'know?"; Transliteration: "Kabe-tte Kowakunai no?" (Japanese: 壁って怖くないの?)	May 24, 2013
Hinata invites Kokona and a reluctant Aoi to try out indoor climbing. The girls run into Kaede who offers to teach them how to ascend the climbing wall. After seeing Hinata give it a try, Aoi takes a turn and discovers that she actually had fun and attempts a more difficult course. She soon finds herself stuck at the top of the wall but is encouraged by Hinato to let go of the grip and falls on the soft cushions below. Afterwards, Kaede explains that she also used to have a fear of heights, but overcame it by experiencing the thrill of climbing. Despite acknowledging her fear, Kaede's words motivate Aoi to become stronger.

=== Encouragement of Climb: Second Season (2014) ===
No. overall	No. in season	Title	Original air date
13	1	"Let's Camp Overnight in a Tent!"; Transliteration: "Tento ni Tomarou!" (Japanese: テントに泊まろう！)	July 9, 2014
Hinata teaches Aoi how to pitch up a tent for a camping sleepover with Kaede and Kokona in Hinata's garden. After having some curry for dinner and taking turns in Hinata's bath, the girls spend time in the tent having all sorts of conversations. As Aoi finds herself unable to sleep, she watches the sunrise with Hinata.
14	2	"Let's Go See Mount Fuji!"; Transliteration: "Fuji-san o Mi ni Ikou!" (Japanese: 富士山を見に行こう!)	July 16, 2014
Inspired by her sunrise talk with Aoi, Hinata gets Kaede and Kokona together to come up with a way to surprise Aoi with a direct view of Mt. Fuji. Picking a mountain at random, they decide to plan a trip up Mt. Mitsutōge, which serves as a perfect viewing spot, keeping the destination a secret from Aoi. As the girls make their way up the trail, they try to keep Aoi from seeing Mt. Fuji until they reach the top.
15	3	"Climbing the Mountain"; Transliteration: "Yama ni Noboru to Iu koto" (Japanese: 山に登るということ)	July 23, 2014
After accidentally stumbling upon a view of Mt. Fuji herself, Aoi tries to keep it a secret from the others as they carry on up the mountain. With the path becoming tougher to climb, Aoi struggles but receives encouragement from Kaede, who had guessed Aoi had figured out her surprise. After overcoming a treacherous cliff path, Aoi is rewarded with a better view of Mt. Fuji, which feels more rewarding thanks to all the effort she put in to reach it.
16	4	"The Fun After The Climb!"; Transliteration: "Orita Ato no Otanoshimi!" (Japanese: 降りた後のお楽しみ!)	July 30, 2014
After reaching the summit and having lunch, the girls make plans to go to a hot spring after their descent, which fills Aoi with a sense of dread. However, the achiness from the walk down overrides any embarrassment she had until she finally gets in the hot spring.
17	5	"I Won't Forgive You!"; Transliteration: "Yurushite, Agenai!" (Japanese: ゆるして、あげない！)	August 6, 2014
Aoi becomes angry with Hinata after she ends up ruining something she was knitting, refusing to talk to her the next day. Kokona later tells Hinata that Aoi was knitting a present for her, the reason she became mad being that she was so close to finishing. Wanting to apologise, Hinata asks Kokona to teach her how to knit something for Aoi, and the two manage to make up with each other.
18	6	"In Order to Do What You Love"; Transliteration: "Suki na Koto o Suru Tame ni" (Japanese: 好きな事をするために)	August 13, 2014
After hearing from Hinata's father about how he watched the sunrise from atop a mountain during high school, Aoi decides she wants to climb Mt. Fuji at night. Finding a down jacket to be too expensive, Aoi tries to borrow one from her mother, only for her to refuse to let Aoi go climbing out of concern for her safety. As Aoi becomes depressed, her father encourages her to convince her mother that she is doing something that she loves, eventually managing to get her permission.
19	7	"Encouragement of Swim?"; Transliteration: "Kawa no Susume?" (Japanese: カワノススメ?)	August 20, 2014
Hinata takes Aoi to visit Azuma Gorge, suggesting they invite Kaede and Kokona along to go swimming in sexy swimsuits. Aoi, who only has her school swimsuit, tries to pick out a sexy swimsuit for herself. After several unforeseen events leave the river unfit for swimming, the girls instead decide to wear their swimsuits in Hinata's garden pool, where Hinata's "sexy" swimsuit turns out to just be her school swimsuit.
20	8	"Make Lovely Memories"; Transliteration: "Suteki na Omoide o" (Japanese: 素敵な思い出を)	August 27, 2014
The girls make their preparations for the Mt. Fuji climb, with Kaede advising the girls to bring plenty of snacks to fuel themselves. After buying some snacks with Hinata and Kokona, Aoi starts to become nervous if she'll be able to climb Mt. Fuji, but the others assure her they all think the same way. On the night before the climb, Aoi hears from Kaede about how she continues to push through the hard moments to enjoy the happy memories. The next day, Aoi joins up with the others as they set off for Mt. Fuji.
21	9	"Nice to Meet You, Mt. Fuji!"; Transliteration: "Hajimemashite, Fuji-san" (Japanese: 初めまして、富士山)	September 3, 2014
Arriving at Mt. Fuji's fifth station, the girls take some time to get some lunch and explore the stores before beginning their ascent. As they continue to progress, the climb gets progressively harder and Aoi starts feeling more and more tired, but remains determined to see the climb through.
22	10	"Mt. Fuji Is Not Easy..."; Transliteration: "Fuji-san tte, Amakunai..." (Japanese: 富士山って、甘くない･･･)	September 10, 2014
As the group approach the 8th station, Aoi is overcome by tiredness and headaches from pushing herself too hard. Believing Aoi to have developed altitude sickness, Kaede decides to stay behind to look after her while Hinata and Kokona go on ahead. With Aoi unable to climb any further, much to her dismay, Hinata and Kokona aim to reach the summit before sunrise on her behalf.
23	11	"I've Had Enough!!"; Transliteration: "Mo~o, yada!!" (Japanese: もぉ、やだ!!)	September 17, 2014
Hinata and Kokona manage to reach the summit in time to watch the sunrise. Meanwhile, as Aoi and Kaede watch from the 8th station, Aoi feels frustrated that she wasn't able to make it to the summit herself. Later, Hinata and Kokona decide to circle around the basin at the top of the mountain, eventually reaching the highest peak, while Aoi and Kaede make their descent back towards the 5th station. After the group reassemble and head on the bus back, Aoi is left downhearted by the experience.
24	12	"Dear My Friend" (Japanese: Dear My Friend)	September 24, 2014
As summer vacation begins, Aoi has still remained depressed from her failure, with Hinata unsure about how to help her. Upon receiving some postcards Hinata and Kokona had sent from Mt. Fuji's summit, Aoi decides to take a walk up Mt. Tenran, the first mountain she climbed with Hinata, and coincidentally ends up meeting her there. Together, they explore the other nearby Mt. Tōnosu, cheering her up and encouraging her to tackle mountains once more.
25	13	"The Tale of the Mysterious Firefly"; Transliteration: "Fushigi na Hotaru no Monogatari" (Japanese: 不思議なホタルの物語)	October 8, 2014
After being invited to go firefly watching, Aoi and Hinata recall that they once went firefly watching when they were younger. When they ended up getting lost, they were led back to their parents by an alleged firefly, though they both have different ideas about what kind of firefly it was.
26	14	"Mt. Kirigamine with Mom!"; Transliteration: "Okāsan to Kirigamine!" (Japanese: お母さんと霧ヶ峰!)	October 15, 2014
With Aoi's mother still cautious about her climbing up mountains again, Hinata and her father suggest that she invite her to climb Mt. Kirigamine with them. Whilst climbing the mountain, Aoi is reminded of the mountain she climbed with Hinata when they were younger, though neither can remember which mountain it was. Hinata's father later reveals that mountain was Mt. Tanigawa, leaving the girls excited to try and climb it once more.
27	15	"Raincoat Memories: Hey, Yuuka. What Are You Doing Now?"; Transliteration: "Amagu no Kioku: ~Nē, Yūka. Ima Nani shiteru no?" (Japanese: 雨具の記憶 ～ねぇ、ゆうか。今なにしてるの？)	October 22, 2014
Upon finding an old raincoat in her closet, Kaede recalls her middle school friend, Yuuka, who was often concerned about her climbing mountains. When Yuuka got upset with her after she ended up spraining her leg, Kaede came to realise she had never taken Yuuka's advice to heart and apologised, after which they bought a raincoat together. Feeling nostalgic, Kaede rings up Yuuka and the two go out shopping together.
28	16	"Inheriting Thoughts"; Transliteration: "Omoi o Uketsuide" (Japanese: 思いをうけついで)	October 29, 2014
Aoi is anxious about climbing Mt. Tanigawa as it involves riding a cable car, which isn't good for her fear of heights. Later, Kaede invites the girls to her house, where she explains she too was scared whilst riding a cable car, but found it less scary on her second go. As Aoi is encouraged by Kaede's words and decides to take on Tanigawa, Kaede gives her her old raincoat that she bought with Yuuka.
29	17	"Can You Handle Heights Fine?"; Transliteration: "Takai Tokoro tte, Heiki?" (Japanese: 高いところって、平気?)	November 5, 2014
Wanting to help Aoi get over her fear of heights, Hinata takes everyone to Shinrin Park. After participating in various activities, Hinata helps Aoi to cross a suspension bridge before managing to get her to try some bouncy mountains.
30	18	"I'm Starting a Part-Time Job!"; Transliteration: "Arubaito, Hajimemasu!" (Japanese: アルバイト、始めます！)	November 12, 2014
Running low on funds for her mountaineering, Aoi applies for a part-time job at a cake shop. There, she meets college sophomore Hikari Onozuka, who shows her the ropes. After a hard day of work, Aoi feels her horizon has expanded a little.
31	19	"The Homework's Unending!"; Transliteration: "Shukudai ga Owaranai yō" (Japanese: 宿題が終わらないよぉ)	November 19, 2014
Having made much progress in her preparations for the Mt. Tanigawa trip, it soon dawns on Aoi that she hasn't touched her summer homework. With Hinata on vacation, Aoi asks Kaede to help her out, only to find she hasn't finished any of her homework either. Kaede instead calls in Yuuka to help tutor them over the next week, allowing them to get it done in time.
32	20	"Kokona's Big Hanno Adventure"; Transliteration: "Kokona no Han'nō Dai Bōken" (Japanese: ここなの飯能大冒険)	November 26, 2014
On the day before the Tanigawa climb, Kokona, whose birthday is on the same day, gets some new shoes as an early present from her mother and decides to go on a walk to Akebano Children's Forest Park to try them out. After returning home, Kokona celebrates her birthday with her mother, who ran a little late home from work. Meanwhile, Aoi, who spent the day making a pound cake, wonders about what will happen after her dream is fulfilled.
33	21	"To the Mountain of Memories"; Transliteration: "Omoide no Yama e" (Japanese: 思い出の山へ)	December 3, 2014
The day of the Mt. Tanigawa climb finally arrives, with Hinata also pondering what will happen after she and Aoi fulfil their dream. After a series of staircases and some obligatory forms, the girls arrive at Tanigawa, where Aoi must face the cable car first hand. Despite Aoi still being afraid, the other girls help her get through it before Hinata helps her ride a ski lift.
34	22	"Can We Be Friends?"; Transliteration: "Tomodachi ni naro?" (Japanese: ともだちになろ？)	December 10, 2014
As the girls officially start climbing up the mountain, they encounter a quiet young photographer named Honoka, who had previously helped them by the cable car. Interested in her, Aoi decides to follow Honoka as she goes about her photography. After encountering some rainfall, the girls arrive at the mountain hut, where Aoi and Hinata look back on memories of their previous time there, worrying what happens after their promise is fulfilled.
35	23	"The Promise"; Transliteration: "Yakusoku" (Japanese: 約束)	December 17, 2014
The girls have Honoka join them for dinner, where they celebrate Kokona's birthday together. Later that night, Honoka gives some advice to Aoi concerning her promise, and the two exchange contact info with her. The next morning, as the girls continue their ascent, Aoi and Hinata look back on their recent adventures as they finally watch the sunrise together, realising that their promise will continue forever as they keep making memories together.
36	24	"Farewell to Our Summer"; Transliteration: "Sayonara, Watashi-tachi no Natsu" (Japanese: さよなら、わたしたちの夏)	December 24, 2014
On the day the Aoi invites Honoka to join her and the others for a fireworks festival, she and Hinata get into another argument with each other. As Aoi takes Honoka on a tour of Hanno, she can't stop thinking about Hinata and decides to try to make up with her, while Hinata hear how Aoi feels about her from Hikari and decides she should apologize too. Both have trouble finding an opportunity to apologize to each other during the festival, but soon find they don't really need to, quickly forgetting why they even fought in the first place.
OVA1 (6.5)	-	"Encouragement of Bra?"; Transliteration: "Bura no Susume?" (Japanese: ブラノススメ？)	October 24, 2014
Learning that Kaede has been wearing nothing but sports bras, the girls go to the department store to buy her a proper bra. After getting her bra fitted, where she discovers she has actually gone up in bust size, Kaede likens the experience to the first time she started wearing mountain gear.
OVA2 (100)	-	"Encouragement of Climb: Best Ten!"; Transliteration: "Yama no Susume Besuto Ten!" (Japanese: ヤマノススメ・ベストテン！)	March 27, 2015
Aoi and Hinata host a countdown of their top ten favorite scenes from the series, none of which are portrayed accurately.

=== Encouragement of Climb: Omoide Present (2017 OVA) ===
No.	Title	Original release date
OVA1	"Kokona's August 31"; Transliteration: "Kokona no 8/31" (Japanese: ここなの8/31)	October 28, 2017
On August 31st, Kokona goes on a stroll and comes across various places that she had previously been to with her mother, who has been too busy to take her somewhere during summer vacation. She soon comes across a lost child and helps her to find her mother, leading her to a medicinal herb garden which gives her more memories of her own mother.
OVA2	"Hinata's October 28"; Transliteration: "Hinata no 10/28" (Japanese: ひなたの10/28)	October 28, 2017
Later, on October 28, Hinata finds an acorn hairclip in Aoi's room. Remembering that she had made it for Aoi when she had to move house years ago, Hinata feels guilty when she can't find the gift Aoi had given her in return. Apologising to Aoi, the two of them decide to find more acorns to make new gifts for each other.

=== Encouragement of Climb: Third Season (2018) ===
No. overall	No. in season	Title	Original release date
37	1	"First Date at Mt. Tsukuba!?"; Transliteration: "Tsukuba-san de Hatsu Dēto!?" (Japanese: 筑波山で初デート！?)	July 2, 2018
Wanting to repay Hinata for the souvenir she got her from Mt. Fuji, Aoi invites her for a late night climb up Mt. Tsukuba to treat her to a night view at the top. Arriving at the top, Aoi resolves to once again take on Mt. Fuji.
38	2	"Are Hiking Shoes Really Awesome?"; Transliteration: "Tozangutsu tte Sugoi no?" (Japanese: 登山靴ってすごいの？)	July 9, 2018
Finding that she won't be able to take on Mt. Fuji again until next summer, Aoi goes with Hinata and Kaede to look at some hiking shoes. Initially sceptical of their price and heaviness, Aoi finds some shoes she likes and climbs up Mt. Tenran to break them in.
39	3	"Alps in Hanno!?"; Transliteration: "Hannō ni Arupusu!?" (Japanese: 飯能にアルプス！？)	July 16, 2018
Aoi decides to tackle the Hanno Alps, inevitably finding the experience pretty tough by herself. She is soon joined by Kokona, who accompanies her to Nenogongen to look at the shrines.
40	4	"Having Fun with Classmates!"; Transliteration: "Kurasumeito to Asobō!" (Japanese: クラスメイトと遊ぼう!)	July 23, 2018
Aoi is approached by her classmate Mio and invites her and Hinata to karaoke out alongside her friends Kasumi and Yuri. As Aoi worries about what to sing, Hinata encourages her not to overthink things and become more confident around everyone.
41	5	"Let's Photograph Our Memories!"; Transliteration: "Omoide o Utsusō!" (Japanese: 思い出を写そう！)	July 30, 2018
Aoi, Hinata, Kokona, and Honoka go to Marble Village Lockheart Castle in Gunma, each bringing their own unique cameras to take pictures of everything.
42	6	"What Does Coffee Taste Like?"; Transliteration: "Kōhī tte Nan no Aji?" (Japanese: コーヒーってなんの味？)	August 6, 2018
Hearing about "mountain coffee" from Hinata's father, Aoi, feeling provoked by Hinata, becomes determined to try it as well, despite finding coffee bitter in general. After getting some advice from Kaede and Yuka, Aoi goes with Hinata to the Kanhasshu Observation Platform, where she puts her coffee making into practise.
43	7	"She Who Does Not Work, Neither Shall She Climb?!"; Transliteration: "Hataraka zaru mono, Noboru bekarazu!?" (Japanese: 働かざるもの、登るべからず!?)	August 13, 2018
With Aoi busy at her part-time job, Hinata goes on an outing by herself, finding herself lonely without Aoi. During closing time, Aoi manages to use what she learned throughout today to help Kokona's mother buy a cake for her daughter.
44	8	"Two Promises"; Transliteration: "Futatsu no Yakusoku" (Japanese: ふたつの約束)	August 20, 2018
Aoi makes plans to go to Gunma with Honoka while Hinata, unable to get in touch with Aoi, ends up making plans to go to Mt. Akagi with Kokona on the same day.
45	9	"Everyone's Own Views"; Transliteration: "Sorezore no Keshiki" (Japanese: それぞれの景色)	August 27, 2018
Aoi and Honoka explore Ikaho's shrines and go to a hot spring while Hinata and Kokona reach the peak of Mt. Akagi. At the end of the day, Aoi, Hinata, and Kokona ride the same train home, where Hinata becomes jealous of all the time Aoi spent with Honoka.
46	10	"Season of Misunderstandings"; Transliteration: "Surechigau Kisetsu" (Japanese: すれちがう季節)	September 3, 2018
Following more misunderstandings, Aoi goes to Ikebukuro with Mio, Kasumi, and Yuri while Hinata, once again ending up on her own, joins Kaede and Yuka as they study for college. As Aoi learns from Kasumi how much she's changed since taking up mountain climbing, Hinata feels conflicted upon seeing Aoi enjoy herself with others.
47	11	"A Clumsy Traversal"; Transliteration: "Gikochinai Jūsō" (Japanese: ぎこちない縦走)	September 10, 2018
As Kaede invites everyone on a camping trip across Mt. Mizugaki and Mt. Kinpu, Hinata starts to become hostile towards Aoi upon hearing she spent the night preparing food with Kokona. While acting stubborn and going against Aoi's suggestions of taking a safer route, Hinata secretly injures her knee.
48	12	"Friends"; Transliteration: "Tomodachi" (Japanese: ともだち)	September 17, 2018
While trekking up Mt. Kinpu, Hinata becomes overwhelmed by her knee injury, prompting Aoi to stay with her and escort her back to camp. Along the way, Hinata reveals that she was worried Aoi would drift away from her to spend time with other friends, but Aoi assures Hinata that she'll always be her dearest friend.
49	13	"It's a Secret, Right?"; Transliteration: "Himitsu da yo?" (Japanese: 秘密だよ?)	September 24, 2018
Tasked with choosing a present for Hinata's birthday, Aoi has trouble figuring out what Hinata would like as she doesn't know much about her. After Aoi inadvertently reveals the surprise, Hinata explains that their friendship is fun because they can learn about each other, and they buy a present together.

=== Encouragement of Climb: Next Summit (2022) ===
No. overall	No. in season	Title (Note: English titles come from HIDIVE.)	Original release date
50	1	"Encouragement of Climb: Prequel"; Transliteration: "Yama no Susume Purikueru" (Japanese: ヤマノススメぷりくえる)	October 5, 2022
50	1	"1st Season: Spring"; Transliteration: "1st Season Haru" (Japanese: 1st season春)	October 5, 2022
Aoi graduates from middle school and moves into her new home, unaware of her impending reunion with Hinata. This is followed by a recap of the first season, in which Aoi and Hinata reunite and begin trekking mountains together.
51	2	"Run! Mountain Girl"; Transliteration: "Hashire! Yamagāru" (Japanese: 走れ!ヤマガール)	October 12, 2022
51	2	"2nd season: Summer Part 1"; Transliteration: "2nd season Natsu Zenpen" (Japanese: 2nd season夏 前編)	October 12, 2022
Hinata takes part in an obstacle race during the school's sports festival, calling upon Aoi during the borrowing race portion. This is followed by a recap of the first half of the second season, covering Aoi's fateful first attempt at climbing Mt. Fuji.
52	3	"Climbing in Tokyo!?"; Transliteration: "Tonai de Tozan!?" (Japanese: 都内で登山!?)	October 19, 2022
52	3	"2nd season: Summer Part 2"; Transliteration: "2nd season Natsu Kōhen" (Japanese: 2nd season夏 後編)	October 19, 2022
While shopping in Tokyo, Aoi and Hinata climb up Mt. Atago to pray at the Atago shrine. This is followed by a recap of the second half of the second season, in which Aoi and Hinata once again climb Mt. Tanigawa together and meet Honoka.
53	4	"I even dreamed about Fuji****"; Transliteration: "Yume ni made mita? Fuji****" (Japanese: 夢にまでみた?フジ◯◯)	October 26, 2022
53	4	"3rd season: Autumn"; Transliteration: "3rd season Aki" (Japanese: 3rd season秋)	October 26, 2022
Aoi, Hinata and Kokona visit Fuji-Q Highland to ride the Fujiyama roller coaster, where they catch a view of Mt. Fuji. This is followed by a recap of the third season, which deals with Hinata's jealousy and knee injury.
54	5	"A Challenge from the Mountaineering Club!?"; Transliteration: "Tozan-bu kara no Chōsen!?" (Japanese: 登山部からの挑戦!?)	November 2, 2022
54	5	"A Whip of Love on Mt. Buko?"; Transliteration: "Bukō-san de Ai no Muchi?" (Japanese: 武甲山で愛のムチ?)	November 2, 2022
Aoi is invited to check out the Mountaineering Club, which both Hinata and Kaede declined to join. After doing a run up Mt. Tenran, however, Aoi decides against joining as she wants to climb mountains at her own pace. On the weekend, Aoi and her mother go with Hinata to climb Mt. Buko in Chichibu, where Aoi ends up having to carry a lot of things.
55	6	"Hikari's Big Date Plans!"; Transliteration: "Hikari no Dēto Dai-sakusen!" (Japanese: ひかりのデート大作戦!)	November 9, 2022
55	6	"Together For a White Christmas!"; Transliteration: "Min'na de Howaito Kurisumasu!" (Japanese: みんなでホワイトクリスマス!)	November 9, 2022
Hikari invites Aoi to spend the day with her at Naguri Lake in Hanno, where they go for a canoe ride together, later revealing she had recently gotten dumped and needed some comforting. On Christmas Eve, Aoi invites everyone over for a Christmas party only to get suddenly called into work to help sell Christmas cakes. When Aoi does eventually get home, failing to surprised everyone with a Santa outfit, the girls give her a small surprise of their own.
56	7	"Where to Watch The First Sunrise"; Transliteration: "Hatsuhinode, Doko de Miru?" (Japanese: 初日の出、どこで見る?)	November 16, 2022
56	7	"Hiking With Classmates!"; Transliteration: "Kurasumeito to Yamanobori!" (Japanese: クラスメイトと山登り!)	November 16, 2022
Aoi, Hinata and Kokona see in the New Year together before climbing up Mt. Hiwada in Hidaka to watch the first sunrise. Later, Aoi and Hinata join Kasumi, Mio and Yuri on a temple visit to Mt. Takao, deciding to climb up it instead of taking the cable car, where Aoi manages to grow a little closer to Kasumi.
57	8	"Power Spot For Valentine's Day?"; Transliteration: "Pawā Supotto de Barentain?" (Japanese: パワースポットでバレンタイン?)	November 23, 2022
57	8	"Trying Out Snowshoes!"; Transliteration: "Sunōshū ni charenji!" (Japanese: スノーシューにチャレンジ!)	November 23, 2022
On the weekend before Valentine's Day, Honoka takes a break from her exam studies to join Aoi, Hinata and Kokona up Mt. Mitake to visit some power spots, with Hinata paying close attention to Honoka's interest in Kokona. On another day, Honoka once again joins Aoi and Hinata, along with Koharu from the mountaineering club, to try out some snowshoes on Mt. Akagi, only to find there's barely any snow left to try them out on. Despite the initial disappointment, they manage to find a patch of good snow on the way back and enjoy some restaurant food after reaching the bottom.
58	9	"Mountain Stream Fishing - The Meaning of Life?"; Transliteration: "Keiryū-zuri tte, Jinsei?" (Japanese: 渓流釣りって、人生?)	November 30, 2022
58	9	"Off to Kamakura With Hinata's Family!"; Transliteration: "Hinata Ikka to, Iza Kamakura!" (Japanese: ひなた一家と、いざ鎌倉!)	November 30, 2022
Aoi's father brings Aoi, Hinata and Kokona along to a fishing lodge to try out mountain stream fishing, where Kokona expresses her interest in going to Aoi and Hinata's high school. Later, Hinata's workaholic mother brings Aoi along on a family trip to Kamakura, where they hike up a mountain trail, visit a temple, and go to the beach.
59	10	"A New Season"; Transliteration: "Atarashī Kisetsu" (Japanese: 新しい季節)	December 7, 2022
With the school year drawing to a close and Aoi worries about ending up in a different class from Hinata, she somehow ends up taking her entire class up Mt. Tenran to take a commemorative photo. When the new school year begins, Aoi does indeed end up in a separate class from Hinata, with Kasumi being the only one she knows in her new class. When the class has to give self-introductions, however, Kasumi gives Aoi a push to share her hiking experiences with the rest of the class.
60	11	"We Meet Again, Mount Fuji!"; Transliteration: "Mata Aeta ne! Fujisan" (Japanese: また会えたね!富士山)	December 14, 2022
After climbing Mt. Kumotori, Aoi makes plans to once again challenge Mt. Fuji with everyone including Honoka during the summer break, getting feedback on the others on what route to take while they make paella together. Following a suggestion from Koharu, Aoi goes shopping for a new hiking backpack, managing to find the perfect one. On the day of the trek, Aoi is concerned about the weather, along with the possibility to getting altitude sickness again, but her friends encourage her to remain positive.
61	12	"Onward! To a New Summit"; Transliteration: "Ikō! Atarashī Itadaki e" (Japanese: 行こう!新しい頂きへ)	December 21, 2022
Upon reaching the 8th station, Aoi gets hit with another case of altitude sickness, albeit slighter from last time, prompting Hinata to stay with her for the night. Managing to mostly recover overnight, Aoi manages to finally reach the summit where the others are waiting and watch the sun rise. Afterwards, the girls head up the true summit, Kengamine, where Aoi decides to write a postcard to her future self.
