= Uenodan stone age ruins =

Archaeological site in Japan

- 上之段石器時代遺跡 (Japanese)
- Uenodan stone age ruins Uenodan stone age ruins (Japan)
- 36°02′37″N 138°13′38″E
- Type: settlement
- Periods: Jōmon period
- Location: Chino, Nagano, Japan
- Region: Chūbu region

Site notes
- Elevation: 975 m (3,199 ft)
- Area: 23,629 m^{2} (254,340 sq ft)
- Public access: Yes (no public facilities)

The Uenodan stone age ruins (上之段石器時代遺跡, Uenodan sekki jidai iseki) is an archaeological site containing the ruins of a Jōmon period settlement located in the Kitayama-Yukawa neighborhood of the city of Chino, Nagano in the Chūbu region of Japan. The site was designated a National Historic Site of Japan in 1942.

== Overview ==
The Uenodan site is located at the foot of Mount Yatsugatake at an elevation of 975 meters, and covers 23,629 square meters. It is located at the entrance to the Wada Pass as the Hoshikuso Pass obsidian mine site, which was one of the leading sources of obsidian during the Jōmon period. The site was first excavated in 1936 and was artifacts dating from the early, middle, late and final Jōmon period, Yayoi period and early Heian period were found, indicating continuous occupation over a period of several thousand years. The foundations of a pit dwelling with cobblestone floor and a stone-lined hearth, along with numerous pottery shards of all periods were discovered.

The site is approximately 20 minutes by car from Chino Station on the JR East Chūō Main Line.

== See also ==
- List of Historic Sites of Japan (Nagano)
