= Royal Hill =

Coordinates: 36.0953°N 138.2448°E

View of Royal Hill from Kurumayama at November, 2006

Royal Hill is mount at the Nagano prefecture, Japan. Coordinates: 34.85,138.55; Google map: . The North slope is grassy and shallow, suitable for beginner skiers and snowboarders.

The car access to Royal Hill does not require the four-wheel drive, but at heavy snow, the snow chains may help a lot.

Near mounts: Kurumayama, Kirigamine.
