= Kurumayama =

- Mount Kuruma
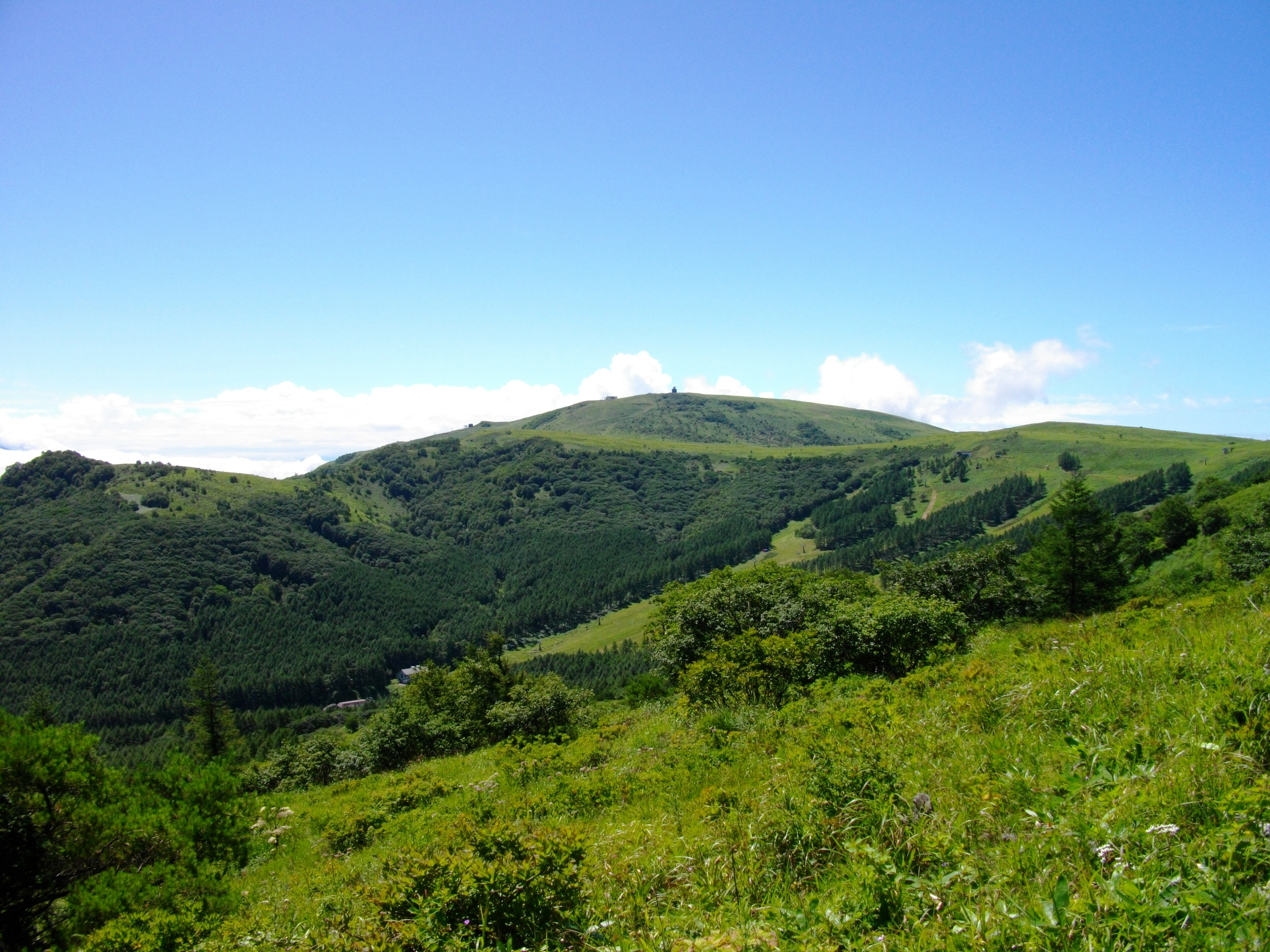
- North side

Highest point
- Elevation: 1,925 m (6,316 ft)
- Coordinates: 36°6′10″N 138°11′47″E

Naming
- Native name: 車山 (Japanese)
- English translation: wheel mountain

Geography
- Location within Japan Location within Nagano Prefecture
- Location: Yatsugatake-Chūshin Kōgen Quasi-National Park
- Country: Japan
- Prefectures: Nagano
- Shikuchōson: Suwa and Chino
- Parent range: Mount Kirigamine

Climbing
- Easiest route: Chairlift

Kurumayama (車山) is mountain in Nagano Prefecture, Japan. A part of the Kirigamine volcano and is the highest point.

The north-west side is covered with forest. The south-east side of Kurumayama is grassy which allows easy paragliding. The car access to the bottom of Kurumayama does not require the four-wheel drive, but at heavy snow, snow chains may help a lot.

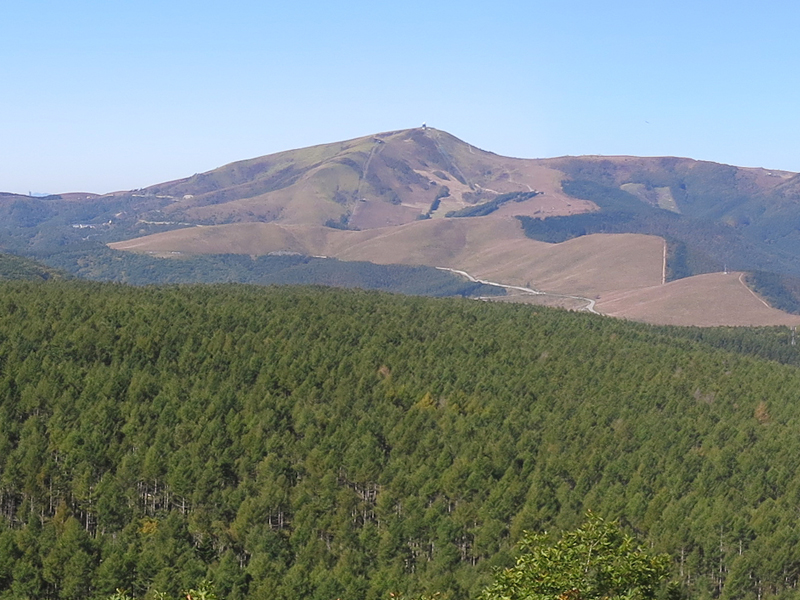
East side of Kurumayama

January

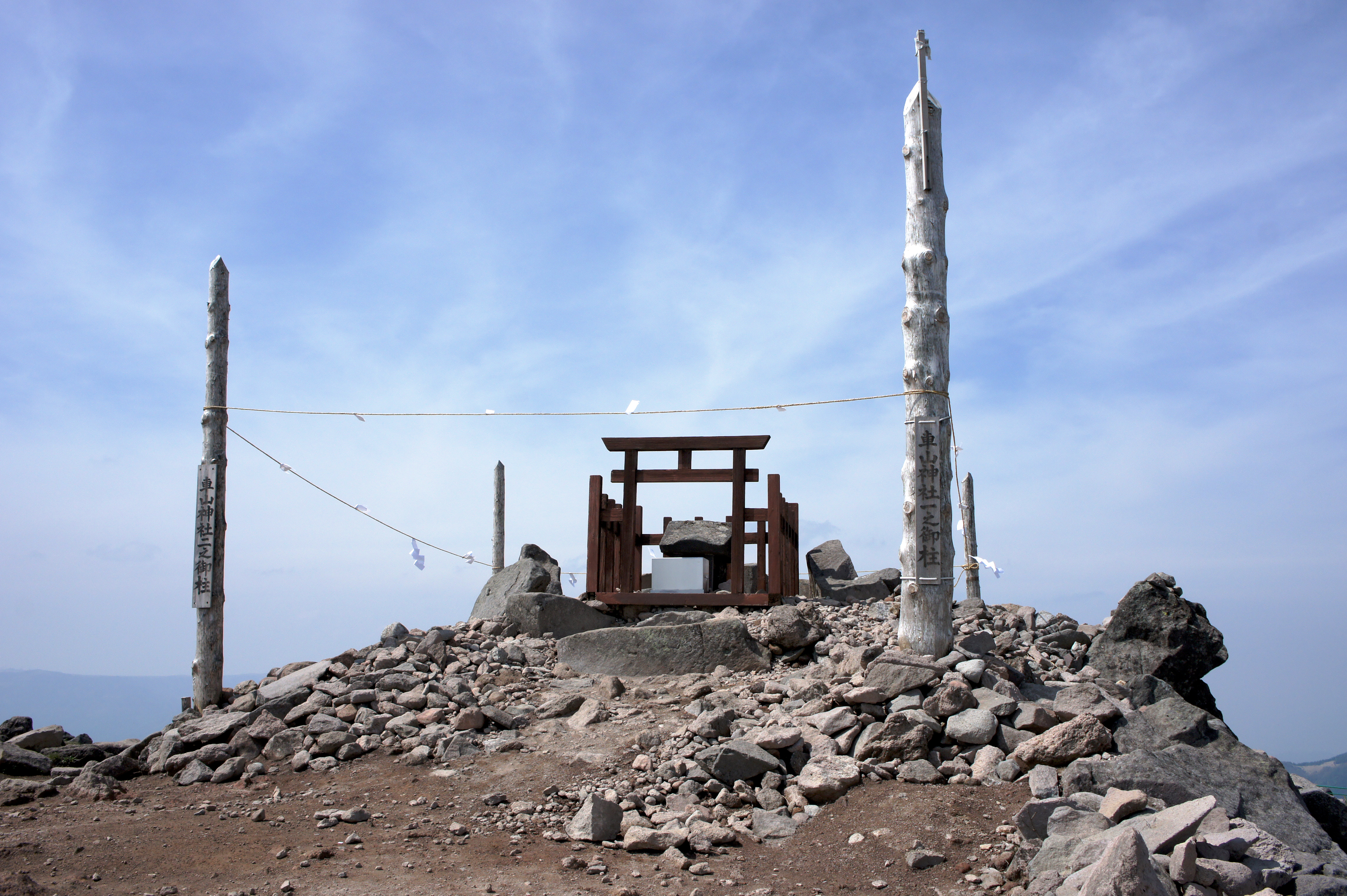
Small Shinto shrine on the summit

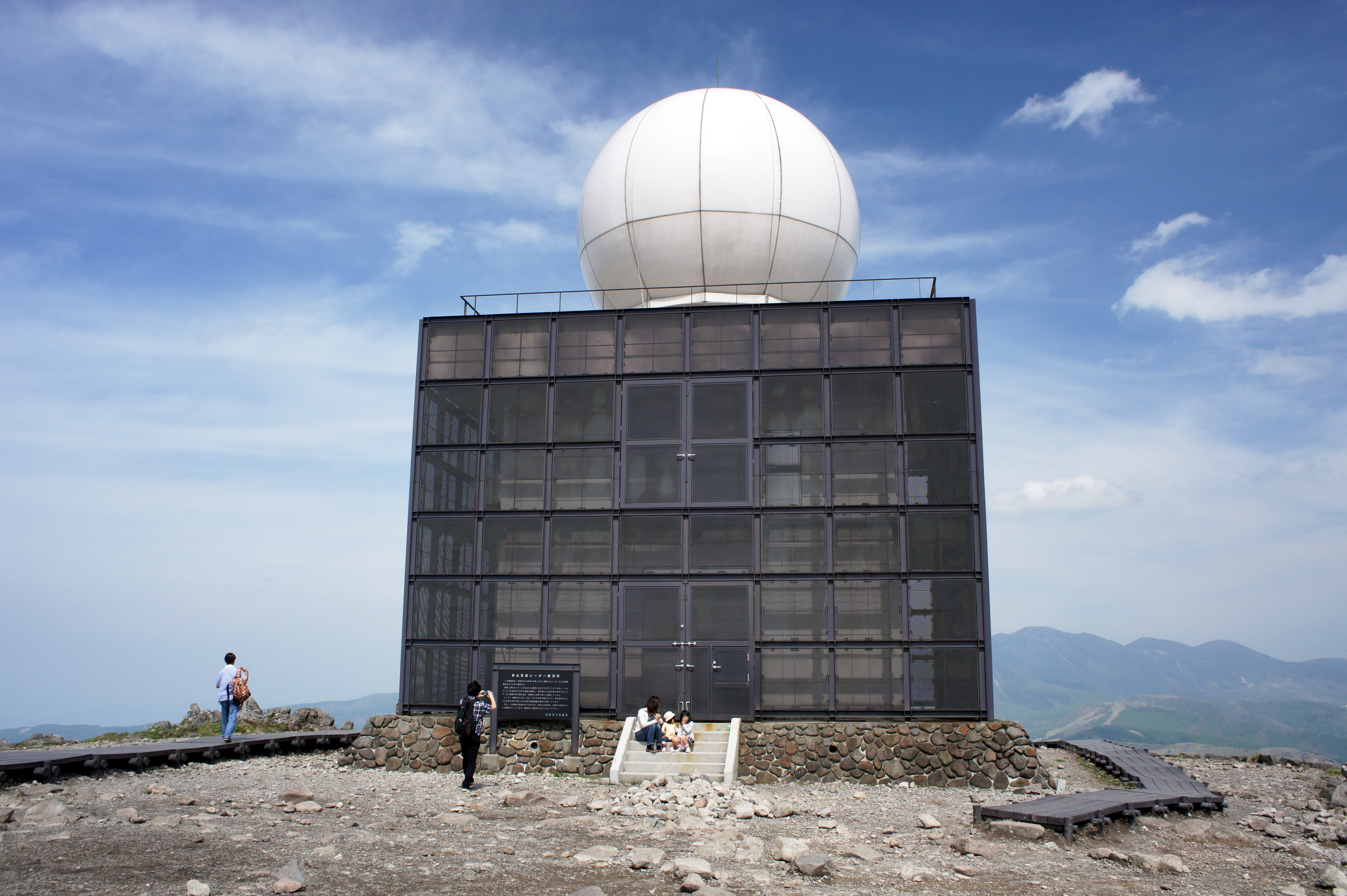
JMA's weather radar on the summit

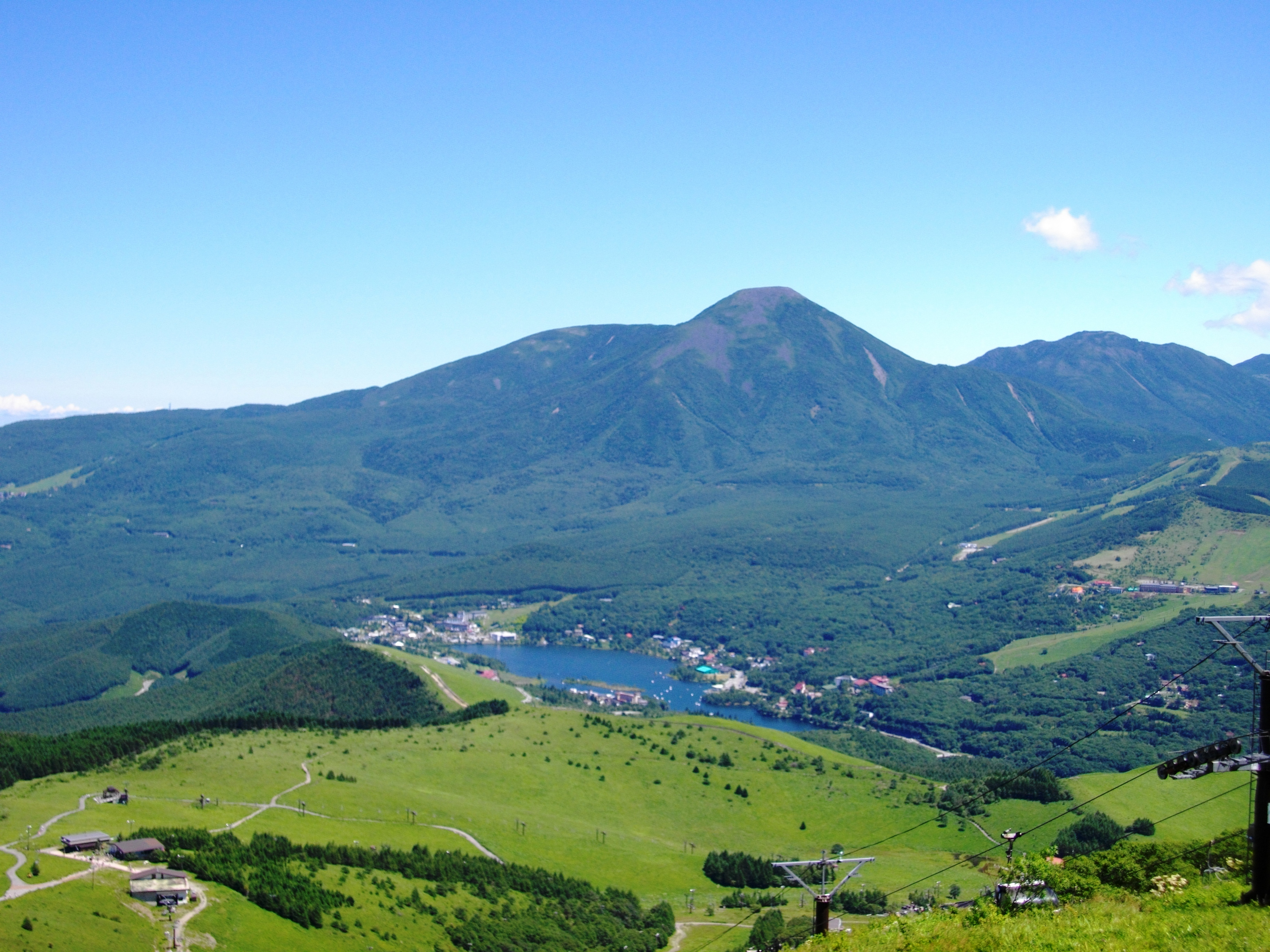
East view from the top of Mount Kuruma. Lake Shirakaba in the center. Mount Tateshina in the background.
