= Hoshikuso Pass obsidian mine site =

Archaeological site

Coordinates: 36°09′0″N 138°12′38″E

Hoshikuso Pass obsidian mine ruins
- 星糞峠黒曜石原産地遺跡 (Japanese)
- Location in Japan Hoshikuso Pass obsidian mine site (Japan)
- Type: settlement
- Periods: Jōmon period
- Location: Nagawa, Nagano, Japan
- Region: Chubu region

Site notes
- Condition: ruins
- Public access: yes

The Hoshikuso Pass obsidian mine ruins (星糞峠黒曜石原産地遺跡, Hoshikuso-tōge kokuyōseki gensanchi iseki) is an archaeological site consisting of shallow pits from which obsidian had been mined during the Jōmon period. It is located in the Daimon neighborhood of the town of Nagawa in the Chūbu region Japan. It has been protected as a National Historic Site since 2001.

== Overview ==
The Hoshikuso Pass is located northwest of Mount Kirigamine and northeast of Lake Suwa, in an area where numerous Japanese Paleolithic remains have been found. Obsidian, or hoshikuso (literally "star-shit") as it was known in the local dialect, was frequently used for stone tools and weapons in the Paleolithic and Jōmon periods as it could be easily fractured by lithic reduction to produce sharp blades or arrowheads. Obsidian occurs in certain volcanic formation around Japan, and obsidian artifacts from Nagano Prefecture have been found widely distributed to many distant regions of Japan, indicating that some form of long distance trade has existed even from the Paleolithic period.

The Hoshikuso Pass obsidian mine site is located at an elevation of 500 to 1500 meters, with the obsidian distributed all over the slope in a 220-meter north-to-south by 300 meter east-to-west orientation. Within this area archaeologists have found numerous crater-shaped shallow indentations, each about ten meters in diameter and two to three meters in depth. Some craters overlap, and others have their sides reinforced with embossed stones and debris. The site also contains the remains of a workshop with a hearth, and numerous fragments and lithic cores and shards created by the knapping of obsidian into stone tools. It is not possible to accurately establish the dates during which the site was used, but it is estimated that it was functional since the earliest Jōmon period to the final Jōmon period.

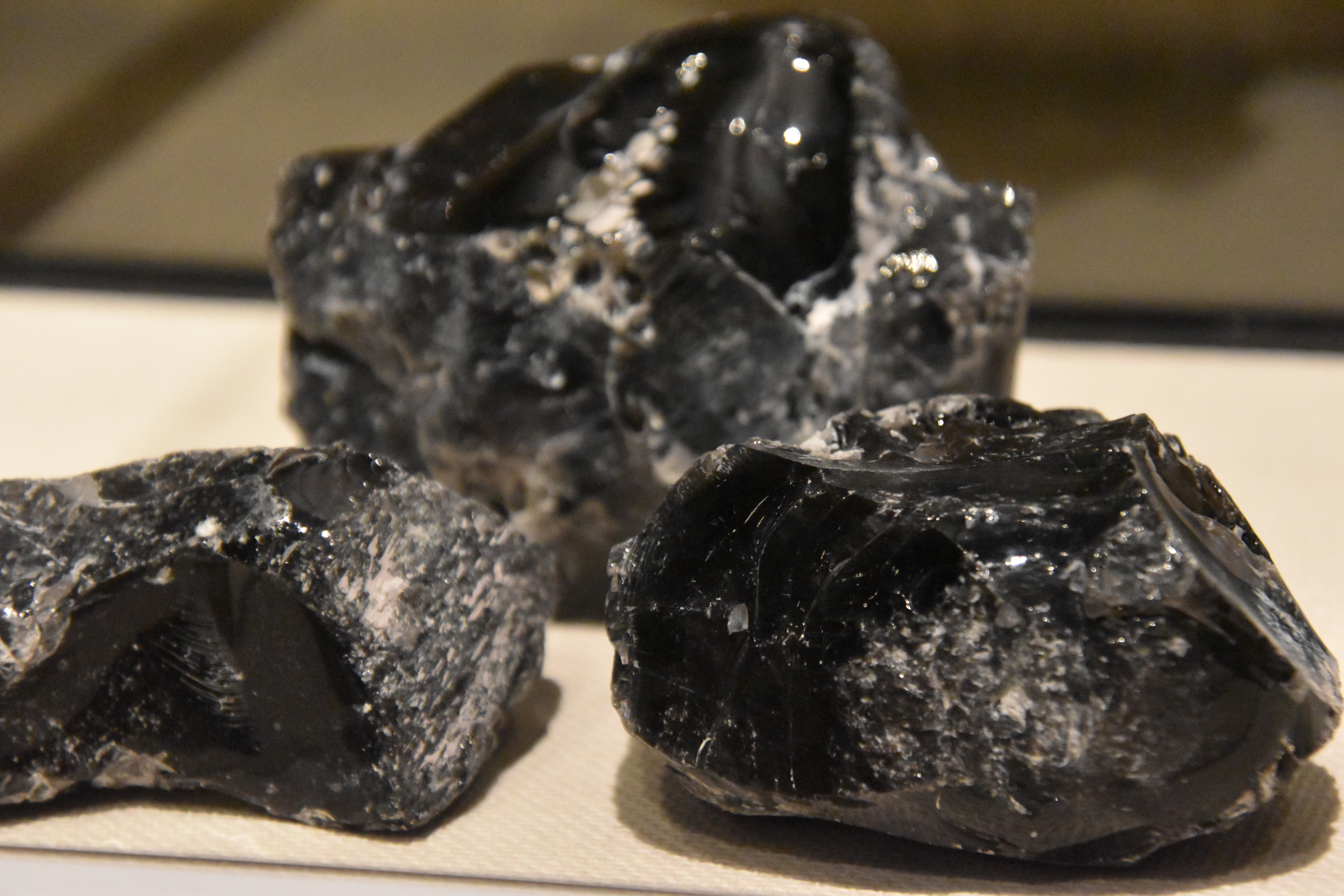
Obsidian from the Hoshikuso Pass site.

The area is open to the public as a historic park with a walkway and explanatory placards. At the foot of the pass is the Obsidian Experience Museum (黒耀石体験ミュージアム, Kokuyōseki taiken myūjiamu) operated by Nagawa Town, in connection with the Obsidian Research Center of Meiji University, which opened in 2004. It is approximately one hour by car from Chino Station on the JR East Chūō Main Line.

== See also ==
- List of Historic Sites of Japan (Nagano)
