= Takatō Bus Terminal =

Takatō Bus Terminal 高遠駅
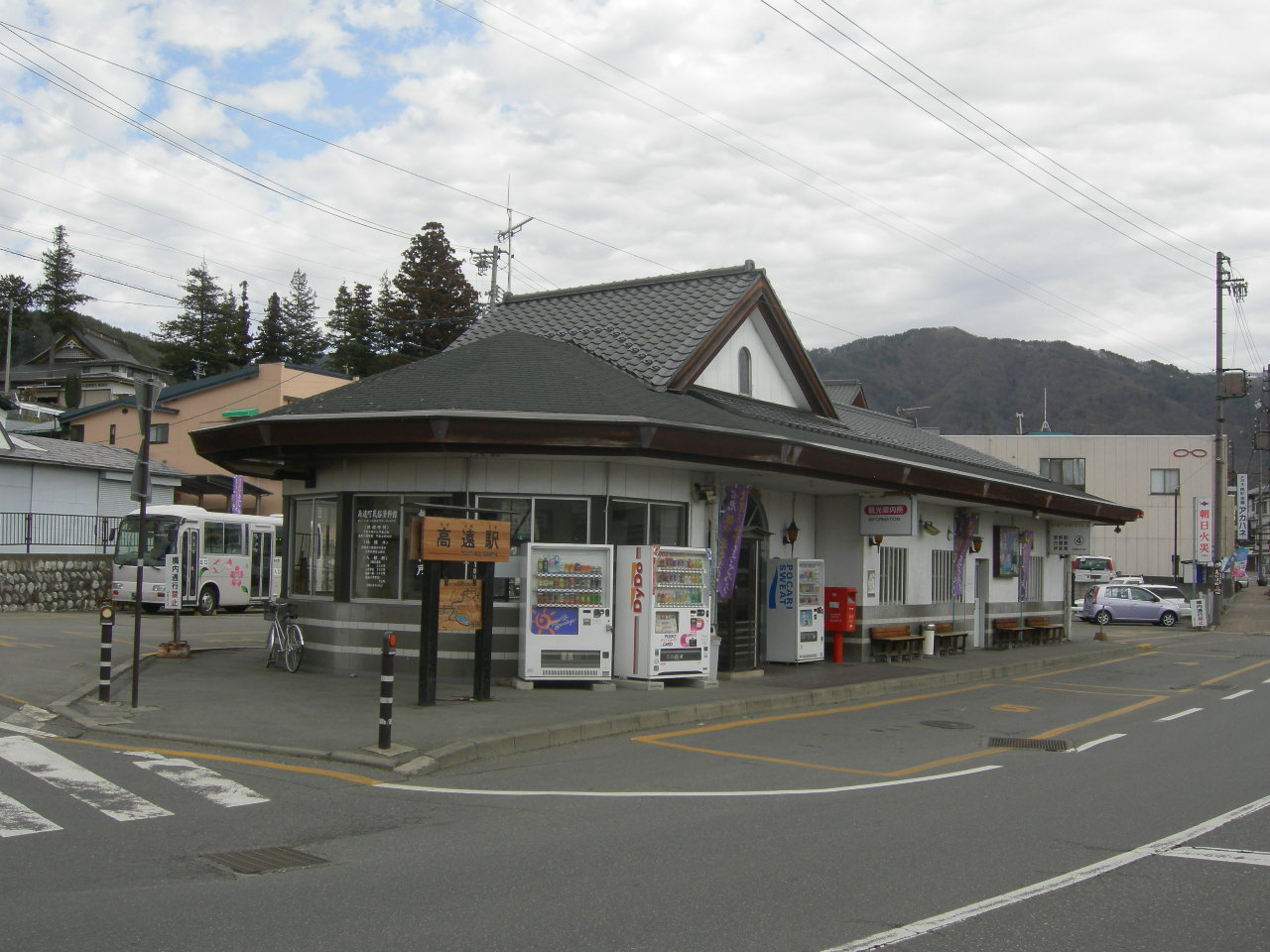
- Entrance of Takato Bus Terminal

General information
- Location: 1735-2 Nishi-Takatō, Takatō, Ina, Nagano, Nagano Prefecture (長野県伊那市高遠町西高遠1735-2); Japan
- Coordinates: 35.837450°N 138.054864°E,

Other information
- Website: official website

History
- Opened: January 1948
Location
- Location within Nagano Prefecture Location within Japan

Takatō Bus Terminal (高遠駅, Takatō-eki) is a bus terminal at Ina, Nagano, Japan. The bus terminal is used by the JR Bus and Ina Bus. The terminal is located near Takatō Castle.

Two bus routes are operated by JR Bus Kanto; Bound to Chino Station, Inashi Station and Inakita Station. Besides, Ina, Nagano's operation of 5 bus routes around Takato B.T. are entrusted to JR Bus Kanto.

== Facilities ==
A store sells tickets and commuter coupons and operates an information desk. The store sells connecting tickets for the highway bus and various commuting tickets, along with books of coupon tickets.

== Routes ==
The IC card is not accepted on all bus routes. Passengers who have Japan Rail Pass are able to ride on the following bus routes without an additional fee.

Routes
Name	Via	Terminal	Company	Note
Takato Line	Inashi Station, Inakita Station	Kimi-Ina Agricultural High School	JR Bus Kantō	Weekdays
Takato Line	Inashi Station, Inakita Station	Ina Central Hospital	JR Bus Kantō	Holidays
Takato Line	Inashi Station, Inakita Station	JR shako mae	JR Bus Kantō	
Takato Line	Jōshi Park	Takatō Kōkō mae	JR Bus Kantō	
Fujisawa-Chino Line	Ina-Fujisawa	Furuyashiki	JR Bus Kantō	
Fujisawa-Chino Line	Furuyashiki, The start of the Moriya trail, Tsuetsuki Pass	Chino Station	JR Bus Kantō	Festival days in April. Does not stop at bus stops at which other bus routes connect Furuyashiki with Takato Bus Terminal.
Minami Alps Geo Liner	The start of the Moriya trail, Tsuetsuki Pass	Chino Station	JR Bus Kantō	Festival days from July through November. Does not stop at bus stops at which other bus routes connect Furuyashiki with Takato Bus Terminal.
Minami Alps Geo Liner	Non stop	Senryuso	JR Bus Kantō	Festival days from July through November. Does not stop at bus stops at which other bus routes connect Furuyashiki with Takato Bus Terminal.
Panorama Liner	Non stop	Kiso-Fukushima Station	JR Bus Kantō	Festival days between July and November. The route passes stops that connect Inakita Station with Senryuso.
Panorama Liner	Non stop	Senryuso	JR Bus Kantō	Festival days between July and November. The route passes stops that connect Inakita Station with Senryuso.

=== Community Buses ===
IC card is not accepted on buses.

Routes
Name	Via	Terminus	Company	Note
Hase Junkan Line	Senryuso, Todai-guchi	Iwairi	Ina City Community Bus (Ina entrusts this community bus to JR Bus Kanto)	
Miyoshi Hase Junkan Line (circular-route)	Ina-Arai	Sekiya-bashi	Ina City Community Bus (Ina entrusts this community bus to JR Bus Kanto)	Runs on weekdays only
