= Chino, Nagano =

Chino 茅野市
- City
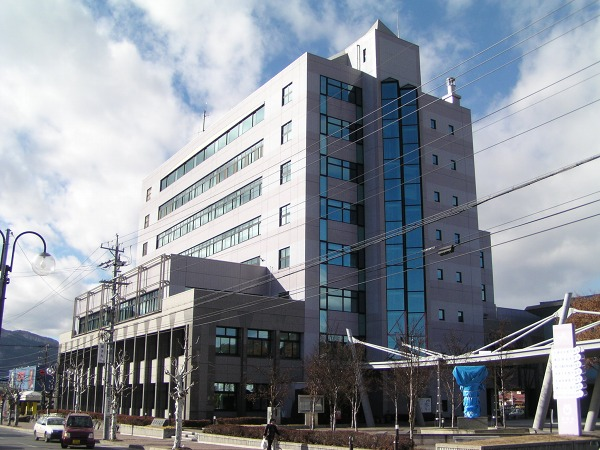
- Chino City Hall

- Flag Seal

- Location of Chino in Nagano Prefecture

- Location within Japan
- Coordinates: 35°59′43.9″N 138°9′31.7″E
- Country: Japan
- Region: Chūbu (Kōshin'etsu)
- Prefecture: Nagano

Government
  - Mayor: Chiyokazu Yanagidaira (since April 2007)

Area
  - Total: 266.59 km^{2} (102.93 sq mi)
- Elevation: 800 m (2,600 ft)

Population (March 2019)
  - Total: 55,673
  - Density: 208.83/km^{2} (540.88/sq mi)
- Time zone: UTC+9 (Japan Standard Time)
- Symbols
  - Tree: Silver birch
  - Flower: Japanese gentian
- Phone number: 026-273-1111
- Address: 2-6-1 Tsukahara-cho, Chino-shi, Nagano-ken 391-8501
- Website: Official website

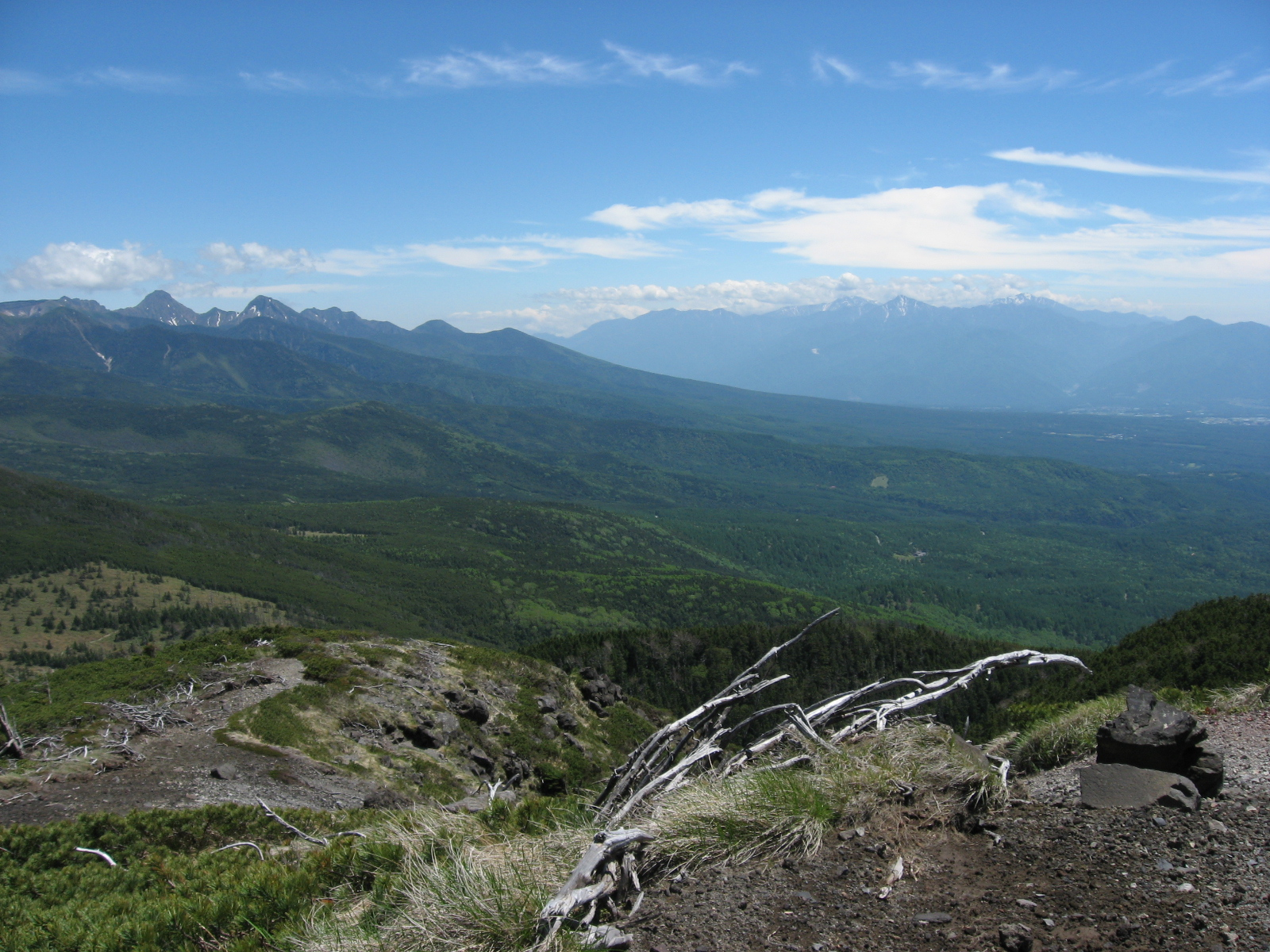
Tateshina Highland from Mt.Kitayokodake

Chino (茅野市, Chino-shi) is a city located in Nagano Prefecture, Japan. As of 1 March 2019, the city had an estimated population of 55,673 in 23,236 households, and a population density of 210 persons per km². The total area of the city is 266.59 square kilometres (102.93 sq mi).

== Geography ==
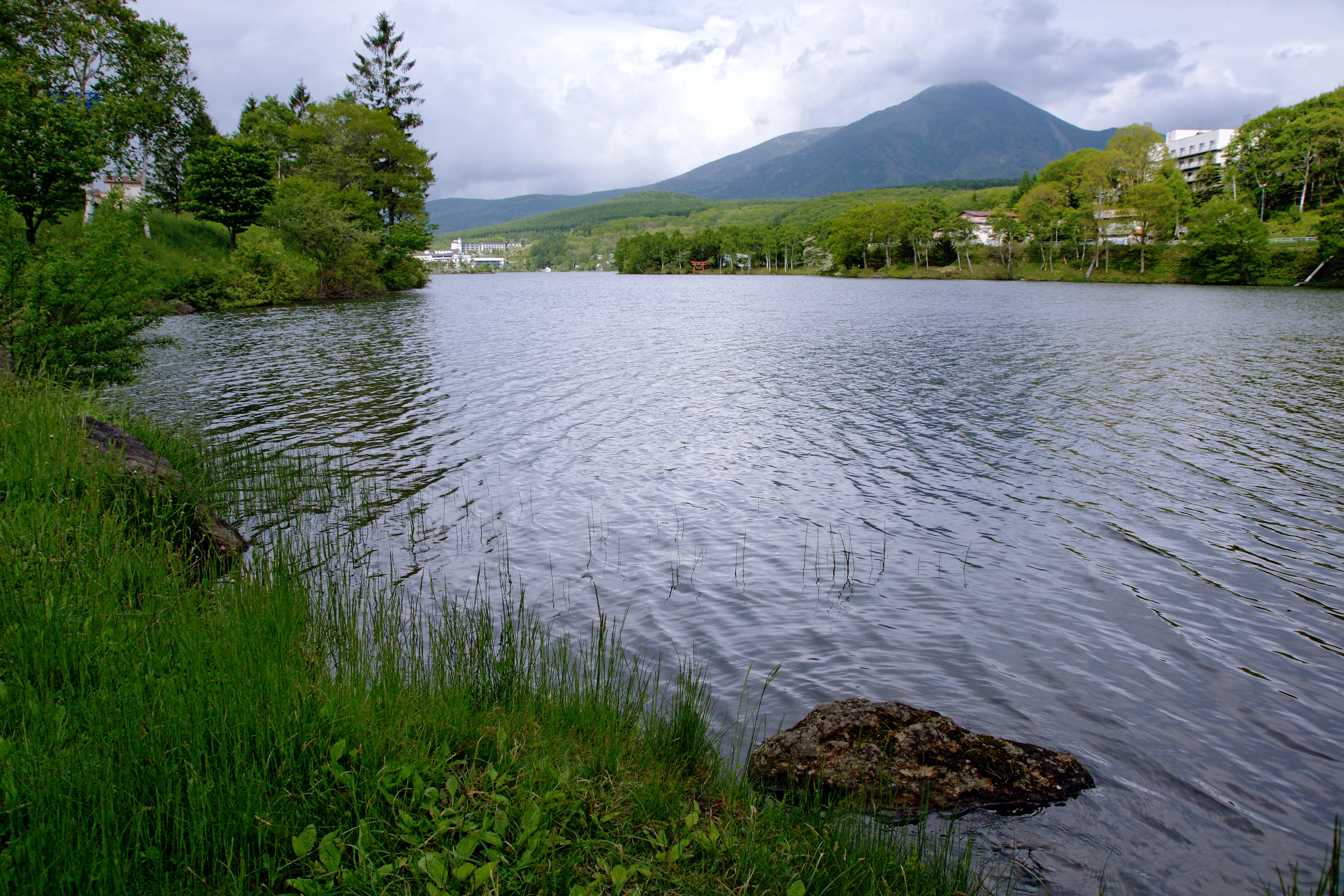
Lake Shirakaba

Chino is located in a mountainous area of the east-central Nagano prefecture. Notable mountains within the city limits include Mount Yatsugatake, Mount Tateshina, and Mount Kirigamine. Chino city hall is located at an elevation of 801 meters and is thus the highest city hall location in Japan.

=== Climate ===
The city has a climate characterized by hot and humid summers, and relatively mild winters (Köppen climate classification Cfa). The average annual temperature in Chino is 10.9 °C. The average annual rainfall is 1310 mm with September as the wettest month. The temperatures are highest on average in August, at around 23.6 °C, and lowest in January, at around -1.8 °C. The mountainous portions of the city are considered part of the snow country of Japan, with heavy accumulations of snow in winter.

=== Surrounding municipalities ===
- Nagano Prefecture
  - Fujimi
  - Hara
  - Ina
  - Koumi
  - Minamimaki
  - Nagawa
  - Saku
  - Sakuho
  - Suwa
  - Tateshina
- Yamanashi Prefecture
  - Hokuto

== Demographics ==
Per Japanese census data, the population of Chino has recently plateaued after a long period of growth.

Historical population
Year	Pop.	±%
1940	32,326	—
1950	38,260	+18.4%
1960	35,220	−7.9%
1970	36,200	+2.8%
1980	43,942	+21.4%
1990	50,064	+13.9%
2000	54,841	+9.5%
2010	56,415	+2.9%
2020	56,400	−0.0%

== History ==
The area of present-day Chino was part of ancient Shinano Province and was part of Suwa Domain under the Tokugawa shogunate in the Edo period. The village of Eimei in Suwa District was established by the creation of the municipalities system on April 1, 1889. It was elevated to town status and renamed Chino on May 3, 1948. On February 1, 1955, the town of Chino annexed the neighboring villages of Miyakawa, Kanzawa, Tamagawa, Toyohira, Azumino, Kitayama, Kohigashi, and Yonezawa. Chino was elevated to city status on August 1, 1958.

In 2018, the Chino Municipal Government created a "Bond Diary" program (Yui Nikki, also known as Kōkan Nikki) for citizens over the age of 20. The program romantically matches area residents with non-residents via "old fashioned" means of the written word.

== Government ==
Chino has a mayor-council form of government with a directly elected mayor and a unicameral city legislature of 18 members.

== Economy ==
Chino is noted for its production of kanten, a type of agar, and the growing of celery and lettuce. Manufacturing includes precision instruments and electronics. The mountains of the Tateshina Highlands are a popular destination for seasonal tourism.

== Education ==
Chino has nine public elementary schools and four public middle schools. There is one public high school operated by the Nagano Prefectural Board of Education and one private high school. The Tokyo University of Science, Suwa is also located in Chino.

== Transportation ==
=== Railway ===
- East Japan Railway Company - Chūō Main Line
  - Aoyagi - Chino

=== Highway ===
- Chūō Expressway
- National Route 20
- National Route 152
- National Route 299

== Sister city relations ==
- (Japan) - Asahi, Chiba since 3 December 1974, updated on 29 October 2015 due to Asahi's amalgament of neighboring townships.
- (Japan) - Sōja, Okayama since 26 January 1984.
- (Japan) - Isehara, Kanagawa since 21 January 1986.
- (United States) - Longmont, Colorado, USA since 25 May 1990.

=== Partner cities for the Mutual Evacuation Treaty ===
Awara, Fukui since 17 August 2014.

== Local attractions ==
- Komagata ruins, Jōmon period settlement trace, National Historic Site
- Mount Yatsugatake
- Lake Shirakaba
- Suwa Taisha
- Togariishi Museum of Jōmon Archaeology
- Uenodan stone age ruins, Jōmon period settlement trace, National Historic Site
