= Mount Kinpu =

Mountain in the country of Japan

- 金峰山
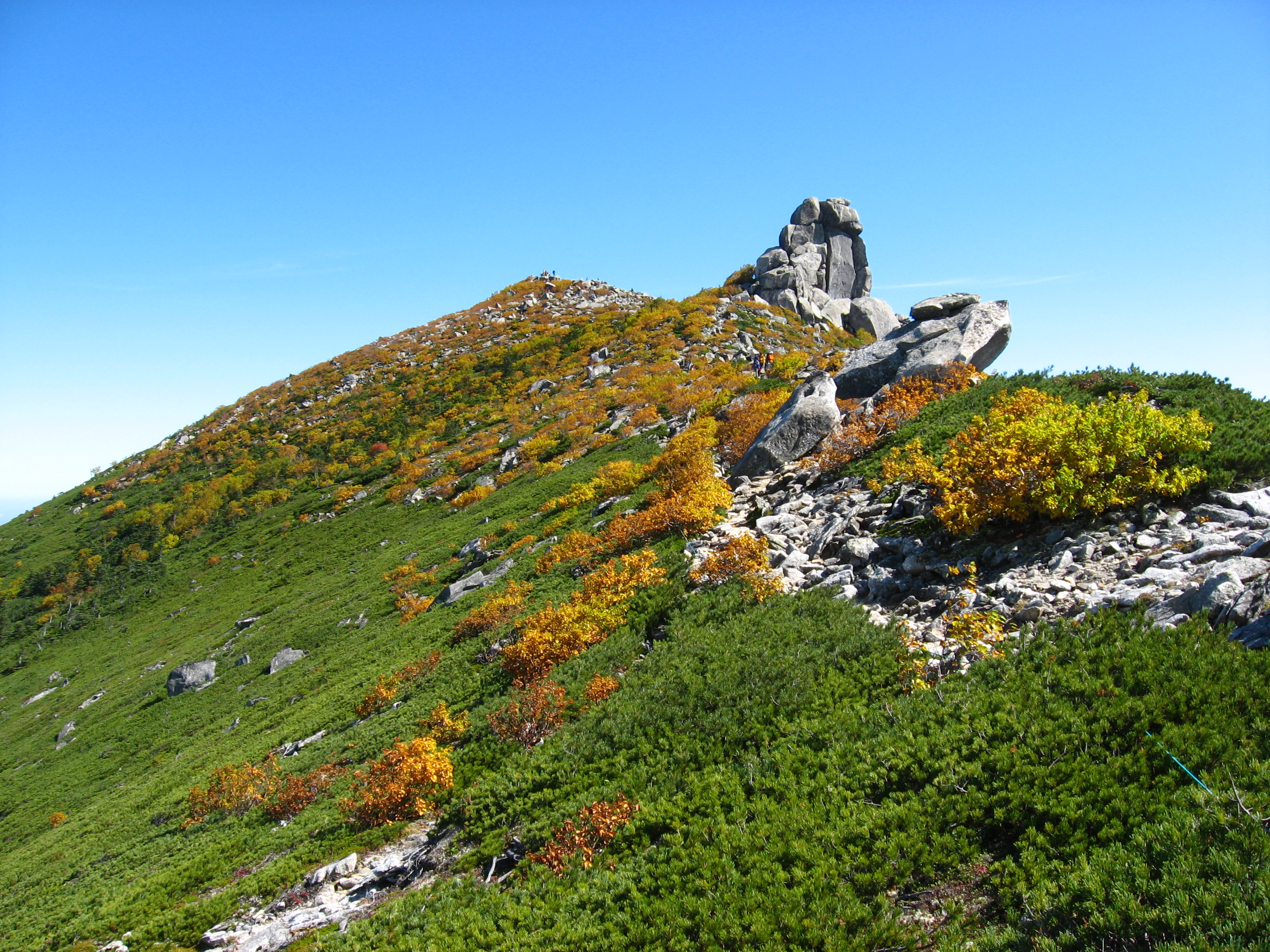
- Mount Kinpu (Oct. 2007)

Highest point
- Elevation: 2,599 m (8,527 ft)
- Listing: Mountains of Japan
- Coordinates: 35°52′18″N 138°37′31″E

Geography
- Location within Japan
- Country: Japan
- Prefectures: Nagano and Yamanashi
- Districts: Minamisaku and Kōfu
- Parent range: Okuchichibu Mountains

Climbing
- Easiest route: Hike

Mount Kinpu (金峰山, Kinpu-san), or Mount Kinpō (金峰山, Kinpō-san) is a mountain and the main peak in the Okuchichibu Range in Kantō Mountains. It is located in Chichibu Tama Kai National Park on the boundary of Nagano Prefecture and Yamanashi Prefecture, Japan. It has the sacred Gojoiwa rock, a Shinto holy site, on its top and is one of the 100 Famous Japanese Mountains. At 2599 m tall, it is the second highest peak of the Okuchichibu Mountains.

== Access ==
First take a bus bound for Masutomi Hot Spring (増富温泉). Second take a bus bound for Mizugakisansou (瑞牆山荘). Look for direct bus to the trailhead. It might be available depending on the season.

== Gallery ==
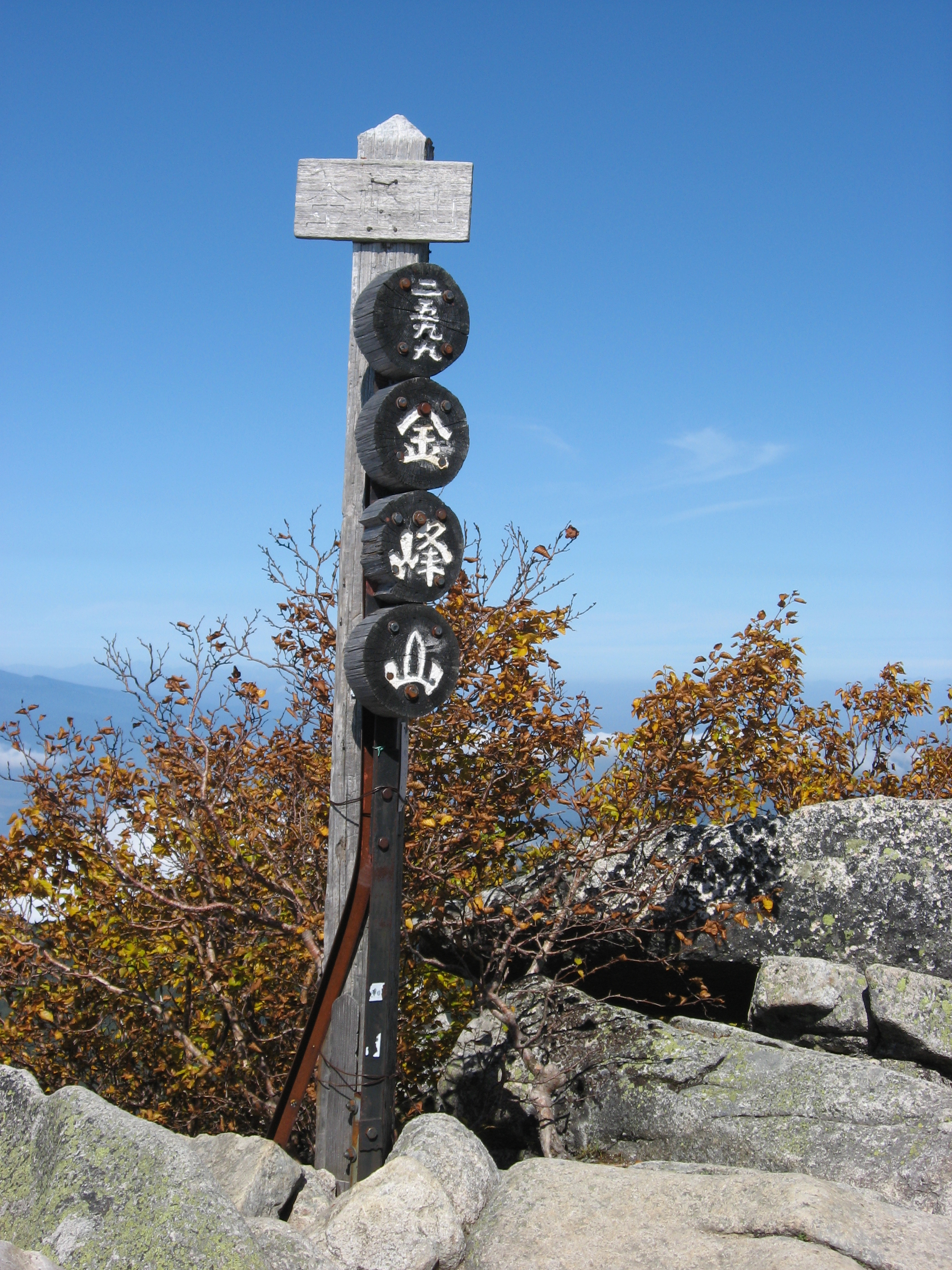
Commemorative plaque at the summit of Mount Kinpu.

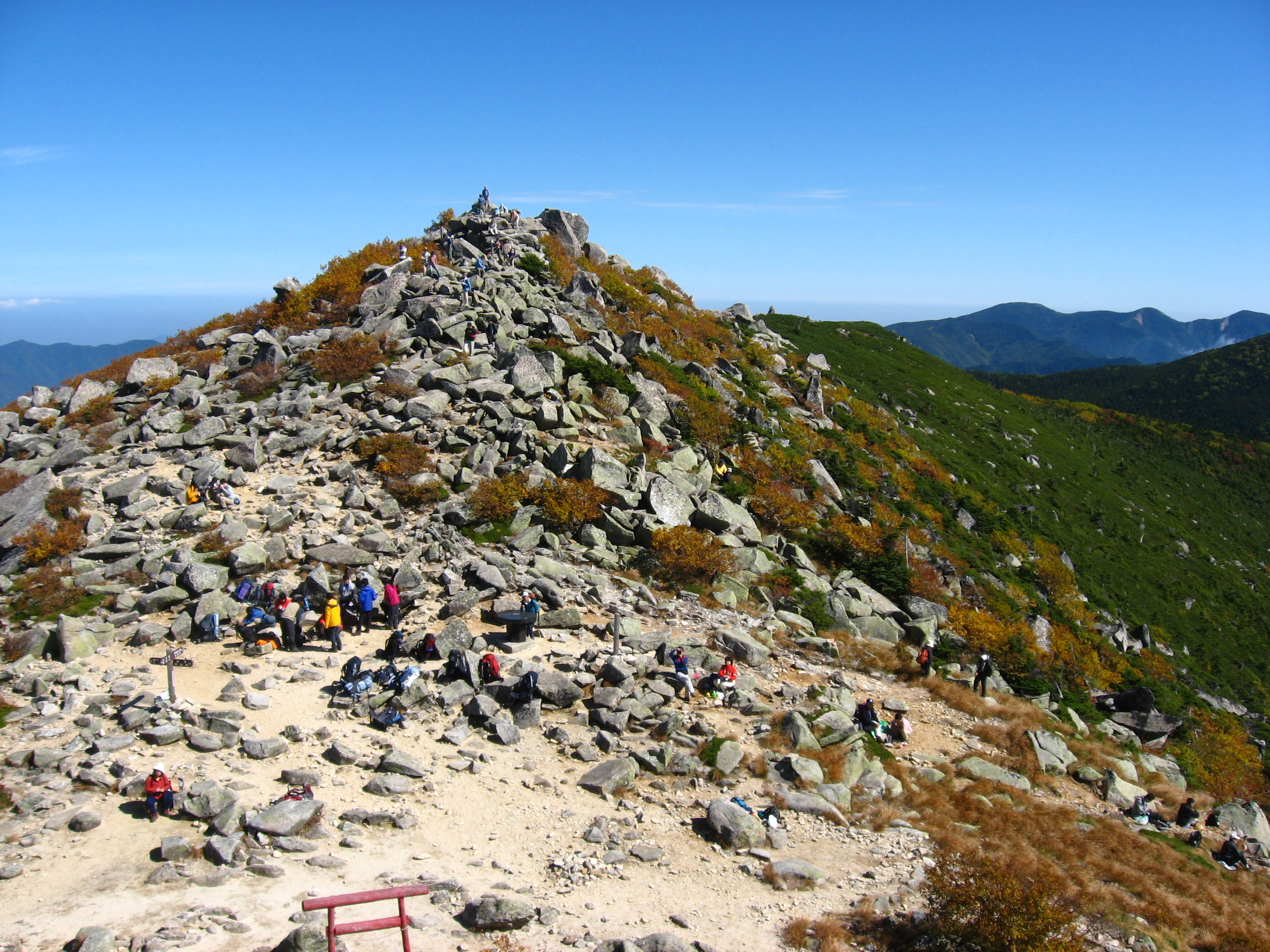
The summit of Mount Kinpu.

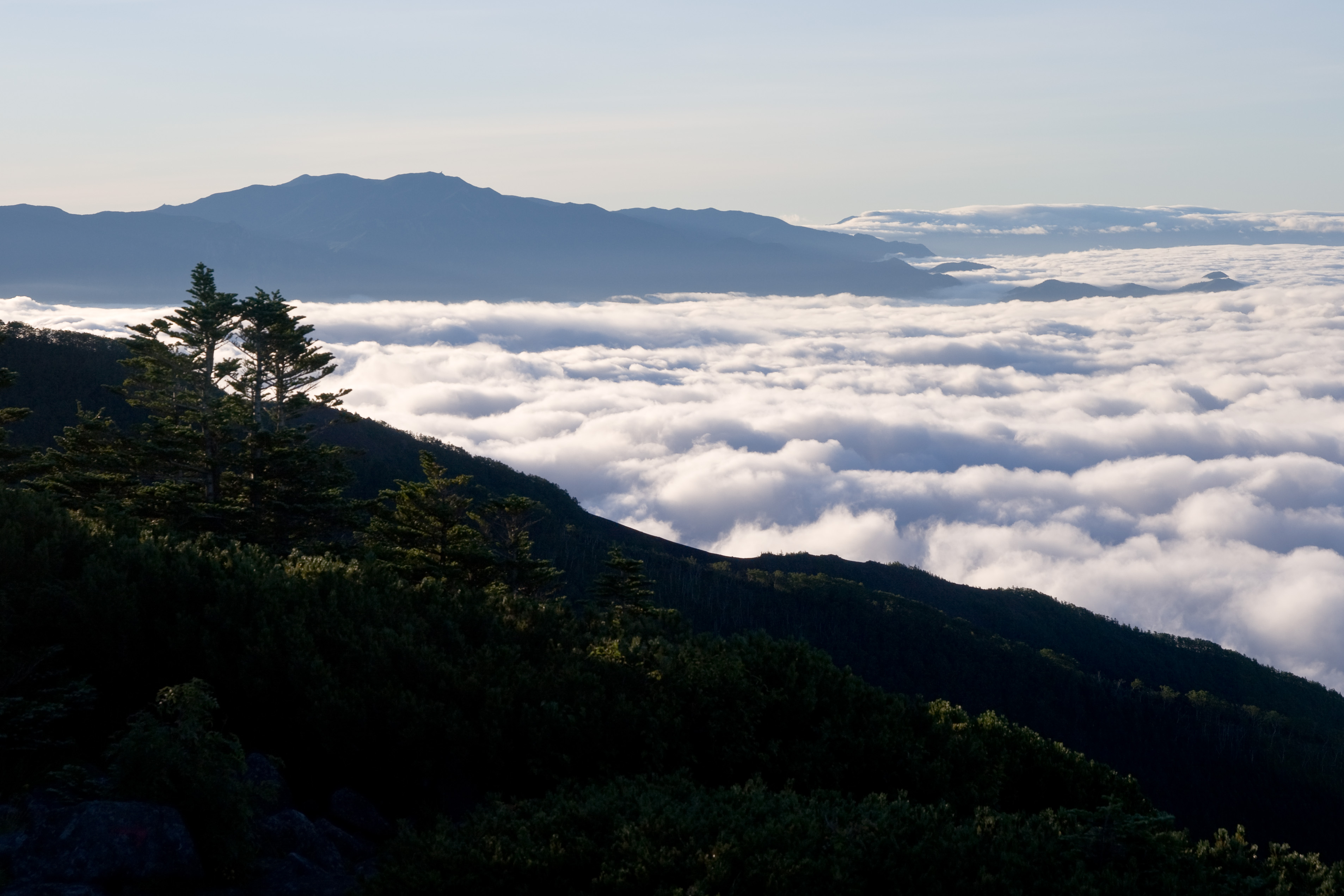
From Mount Amigasa.

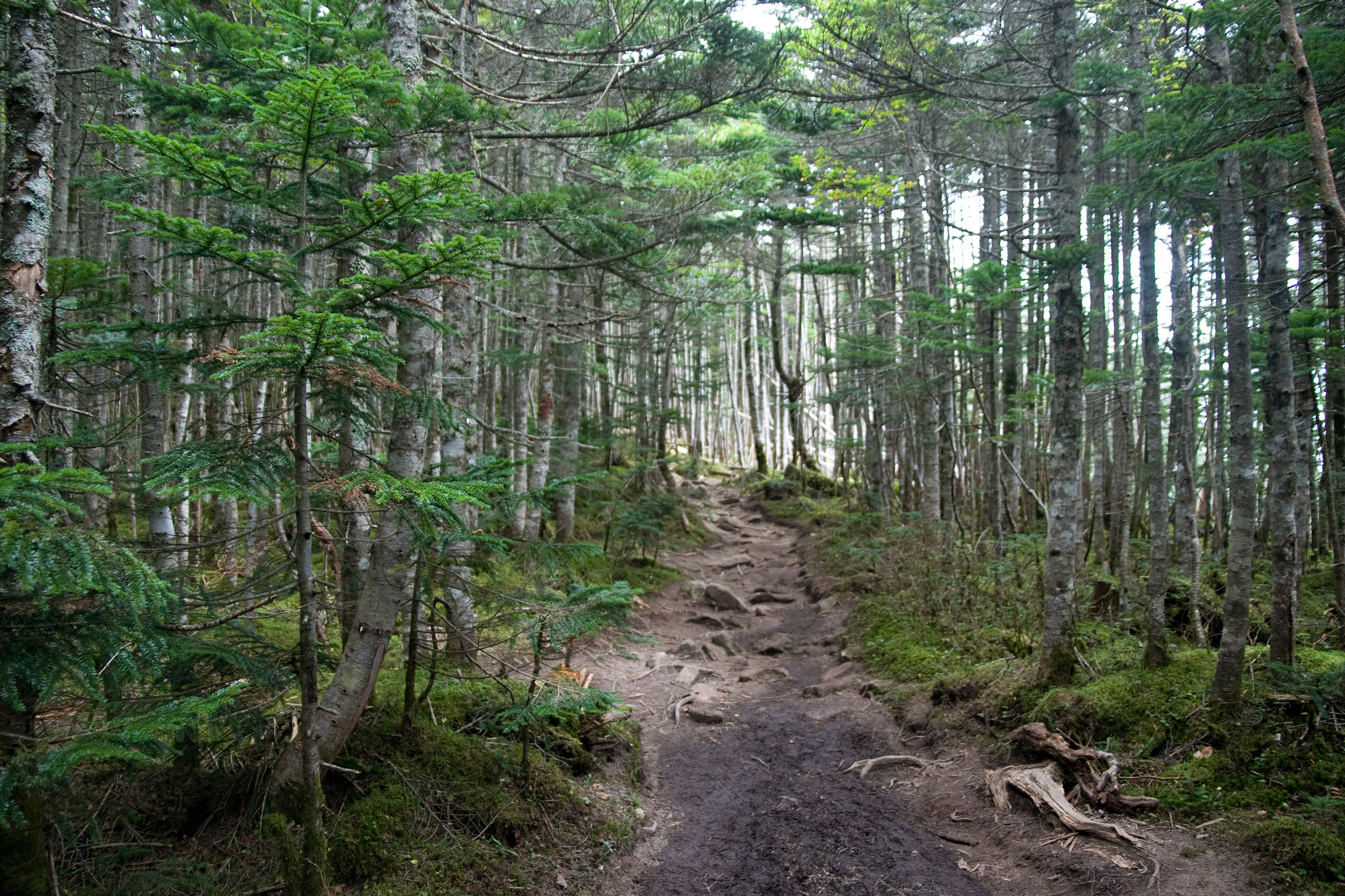
The conifer forest in Mount Kinpu.

== See also ==
- Media related to Mount Kinpu at Wikimedia Commons
- Mount Mizugaki
- 100 Famous Japanese Mountains
