= Mount Mizugaki =

Mountain in the country of Japan

Coordinates: 35°53′37″N 138°35′31″E

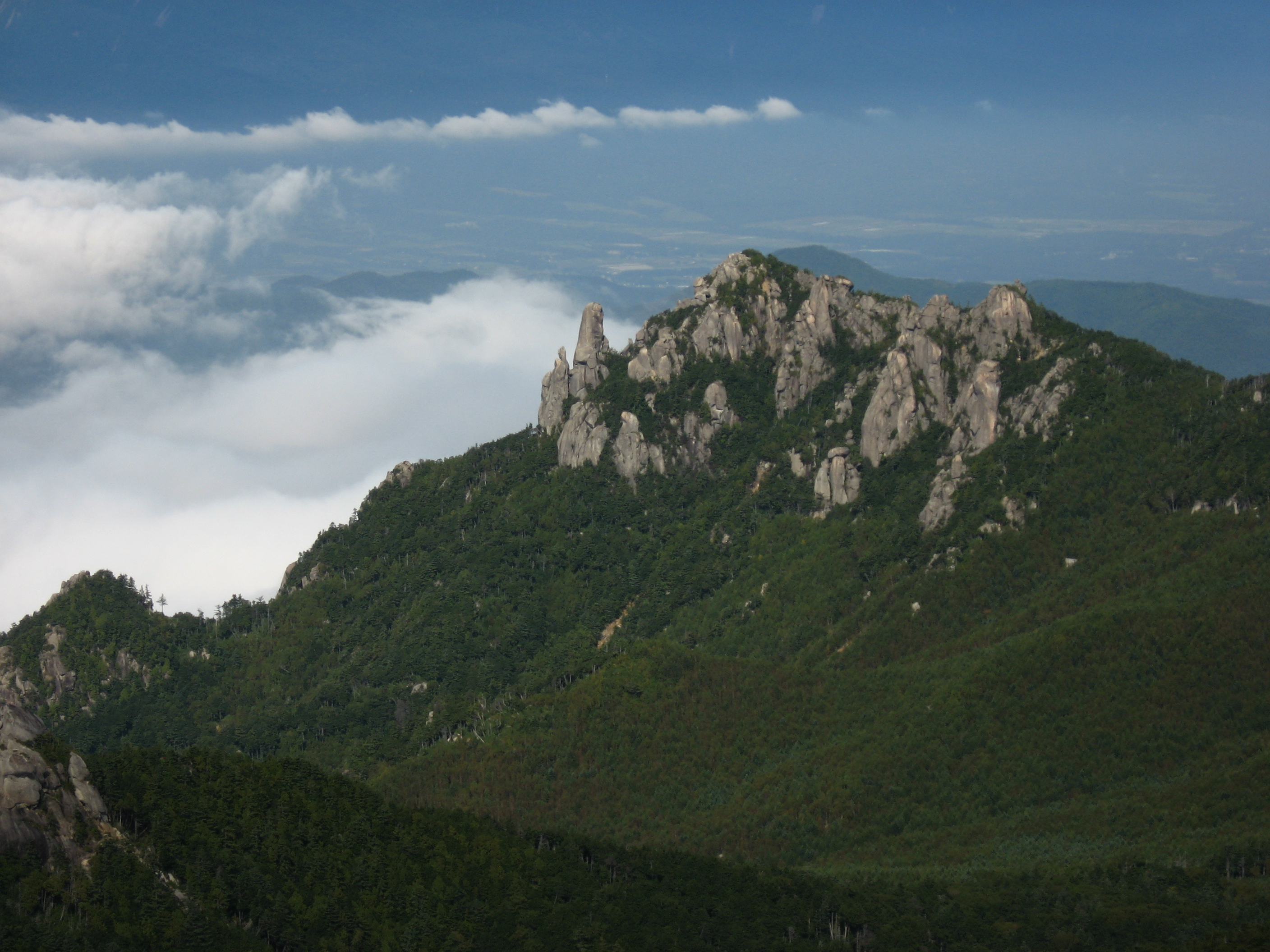
Mount Mizugaki

Mount Mizugaki (瑞牆山 Mizugaki-san) is a mountain located in Hokuto-city, in the Yamanashi Prefecture, within Chichibu Tama Kai National Park. It is one of the 100 Famous Japanese Mountains. It is part of the Okuchichibu Mountains. It has an altitude of 2230m. The mountain is located just across from Mount Kinpu.

The mountain is composed mainly of granite, and has beautiful flowers in summer. Mount Mizugaki has a unique shape consisting of a number of granite rocks, strangely shaped rocks and huge rocks that is opposite to Chichibu mountains covered with rich woods. The view from the peak is magnificent and hiking routes are in good condition. Many hikers walk here especially in the seasons of fresh green and autumn leaves.

== Hiking ==
From Mizugaki sanso (roundtrip): 5 hours 35 minutes (5.8 km).

== Rock climbing ==
It is a popular destination for both boulderers and rope climbers.

== Hut ==
- Mizugaki Sanso (瑞牆山荘)
- Fujimidaira Goya (富士見平小屋)
