= Suwa University of Science =

University in Nagano, Japan

Coordinates: 36°0′29.7″N 138°10′54.5″E

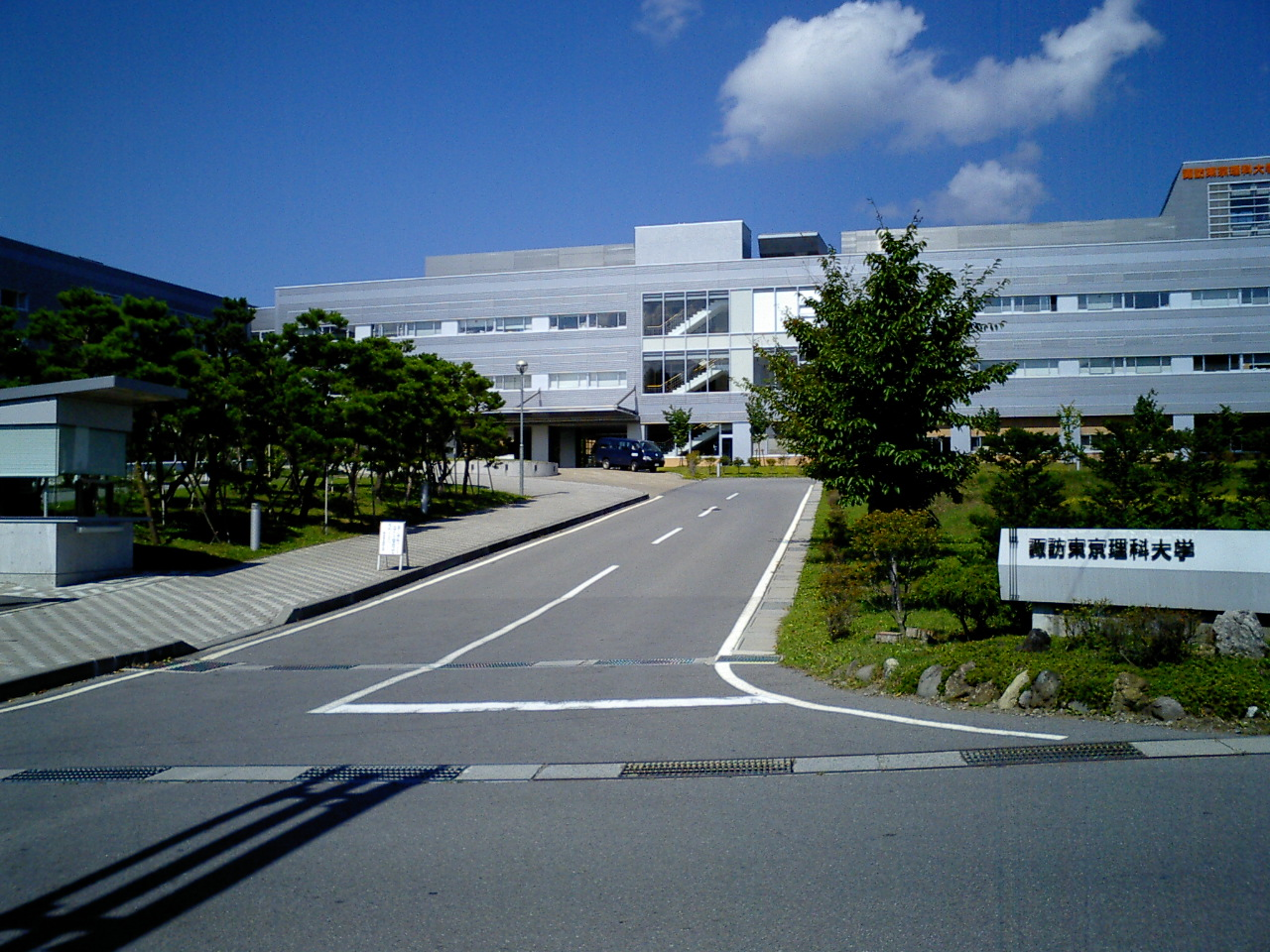
Suwa University of Science

Suwa University of Science (公立諏訪東京理科大学, Suwa tokyo rika daigaku) is a formerly private university now public (municipal) in Chino, Nagano, Japan. The school opened as a junior college in 1990. It became a four-year college in 2002. Beginning in April 2018, the university became a public corporation.
