= Chino Station =

Railway station in Chino, Nagano Prefecture, Japan

CO56 Chino Station 茅野駅
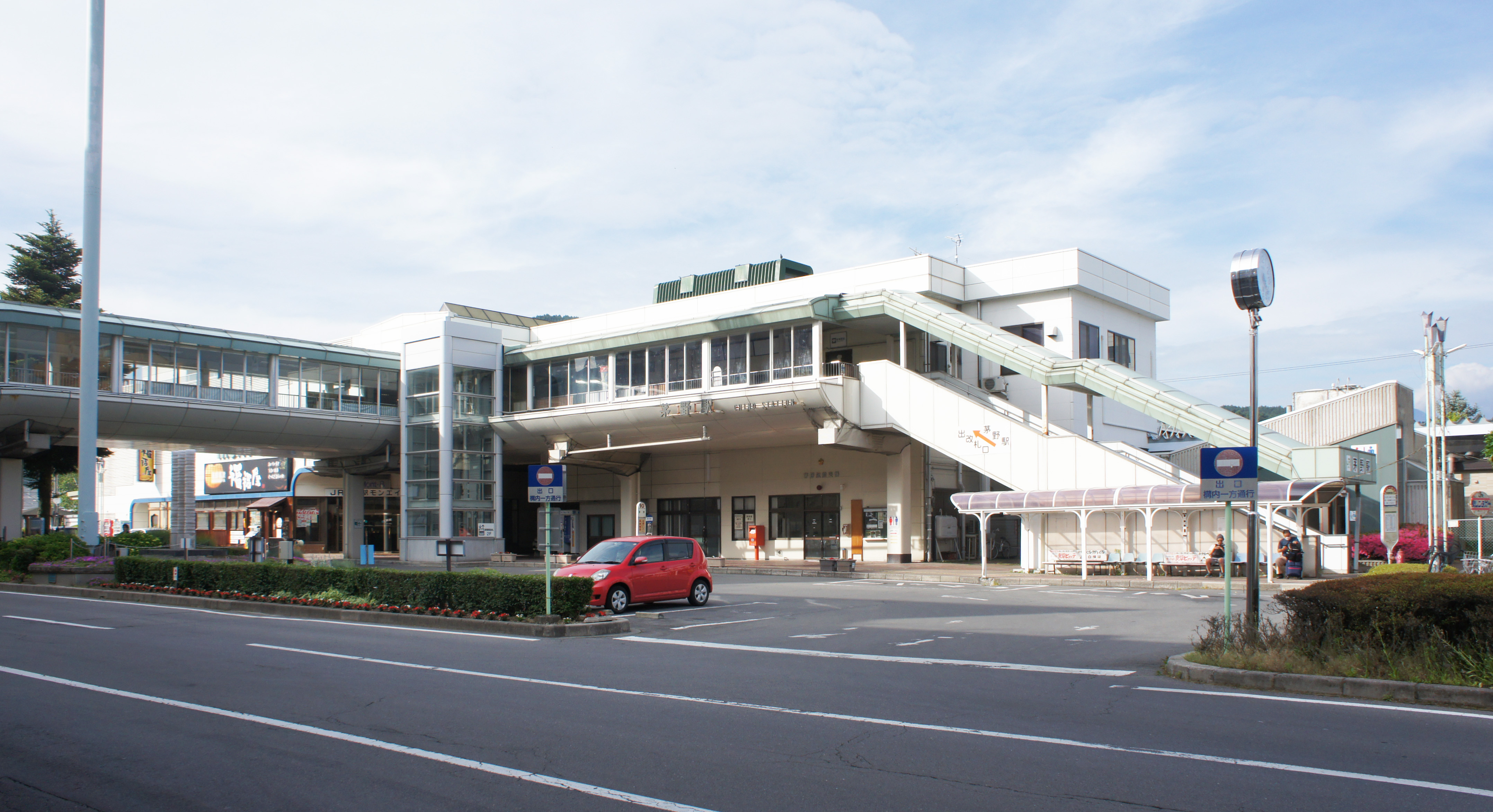
- The west entrance of Chino Station in June 2021

General information
- Location: 3506 Chino, Chino-Shi, Nagano-ken 391-0001; Japan
- Coordinates: 35.9947°N 138.1511°E
- Elevation: 790 meters
- Operator: JR East
- Line: Chūō Main Line
- Distance: 195.2 km from Tokyo
- Platforms: 1 side + 1 island platform

Other information
- Status: Staffed (Midori no Madoguchi )
- Station code: CO56
- Website: Official website

History
- Opened: 25 November 1905; 120 years ago

Passengers
- FY2024: 6,948 (daily) ▲3.63%

Services
Preceding station	JR East	Following station
Kami-Suwa CO57 towards Hakuba	Azusa	Fujimi CO53 towards Chiba or Tokyo
Kami-Suwa CO57 towards Shiojiri	Chūō Main Line Local	Aoyagi CO55 towards Tachikawa
Location
- Location within Nagano Prefecture Location within Japan

Chino Station (茅野駅, Chino-eki) is a railway station on the Chūō Main Line in the city of Chino, Nagano, Japan, operated by East Japan Railway Company (JR East).

== Lines ==
Chino Station is served by the Chūō Main Line, and is 195.2 kilometers from the terminus of the line at Tokyo Station.

== Station layout ==
The station consists of one ground level side platform and one ground level island platform, connected by a footbridge. The station has a Midori no Madoguchi staffed ticket office. A JNR Class C12 steam locomotive is preserved in the plaza outside the station's east entrance.

=== Platforms ===
1	■ Chūō Main Line	for Kami-Suwa, Shiojiri, Matsumoto, and Nagano
2	■ Chūō Main Line	for Kami-Suwa, Shiojiri, Matsumoto, and Nagano for Kobuchizawa, Kōfu, Ōtsuki, and Hachiōji
3	■ Chūō Main Line	for Kobuchizawa, Kōfu, Ōtsuki, and Hachiōji

== Bus terminal ==
=== Highway buses ===
- Chūō Kōsoku Bus; For Shinjuku Station
- Alpen Suwa; For Kyoto Station, Momoyamadai Station, Shin-Ōsaka Station, and Umeda Station

=== Route buses ===
- JR BUS
  - For Takatō Bus Terminal, Senryuso
- Alpico Kotsu
  - For Mugikusa Pass
  - For Lake Shirakaba
  - For Shimo-Suwa Station

== History ==
Chino Station opened on 25 November 1905. With the privatization of Japanese National Railways (JNR) on 1 April 1987, the station came under the control of JR East. Station numbering introduced on the line from February 2025, with the station being assigned number CO56.

== Passenger statistics ==
In fiscal 2015, the station was used by an average of 3,715 passengers daily (boarding passengers only).

== Surrounding area ==
- Chino City Hall
- Tokyo University of Science, Suwa
- National Route 20
- National Route 152

== See also ==
- List of railway stations in Japan
