= Mount Kirigamine =

Volcano on the island of Honshu, Japan

- 霧ヶ峰
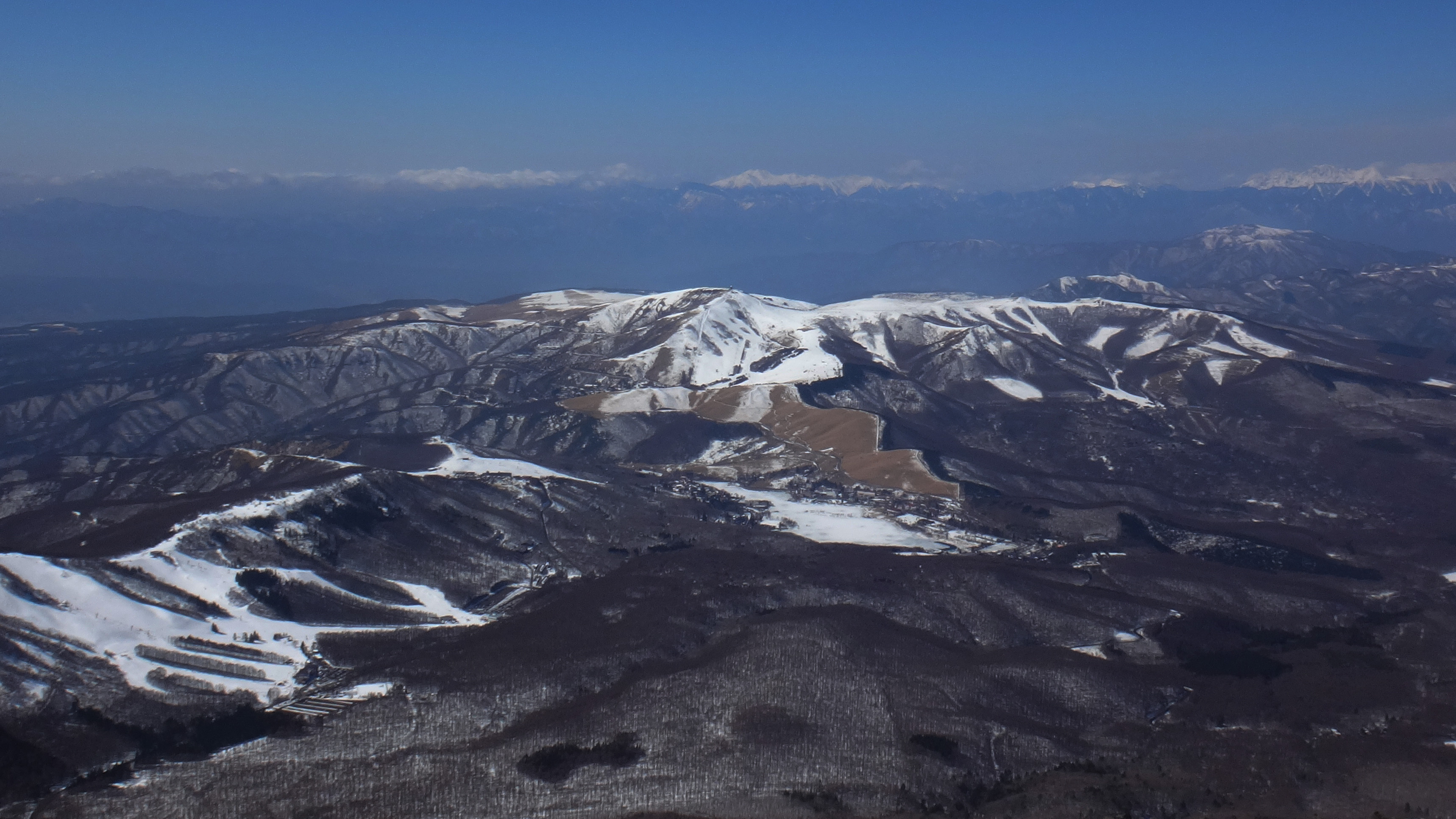
- Kirigamine seen from the east. Taken from Mount Tateshina.

Highest point
- Elevation: 1,925 m (6,316 ft)
- Coordinates: 36°06′00″N 138°10′01″E

Geography
- Location within Nagano Prefecture Location within Japan
- Location: Nagano Prefecture, Japan

Geology
- Mountain type(s): Lava flow, Lava dome
- Volcanic arc: Northeastern Japan Arc
- Last eruption: 0.75 Ma

Mount Kirigamine (霧ヶ峰, Kiri-ga-mine) is a 1,925m volcano, located in Nagano Prefecture, Japan.

== Outline ==
The tallest peak of Mount Kirigamine is Mount Kuruma, on which there is a weather radar site. Most of the mountain is covered in grass with sparse bushes and rocks. The south and east sides are suitable for gliding with a narrow landing zone in the vicinity of a parking lot and a huge emergency landing at the west side of the mountain. The southeast cliffs are a launching point for gliders, with winds above 3 meters. The north part is equipped with ski lifts.

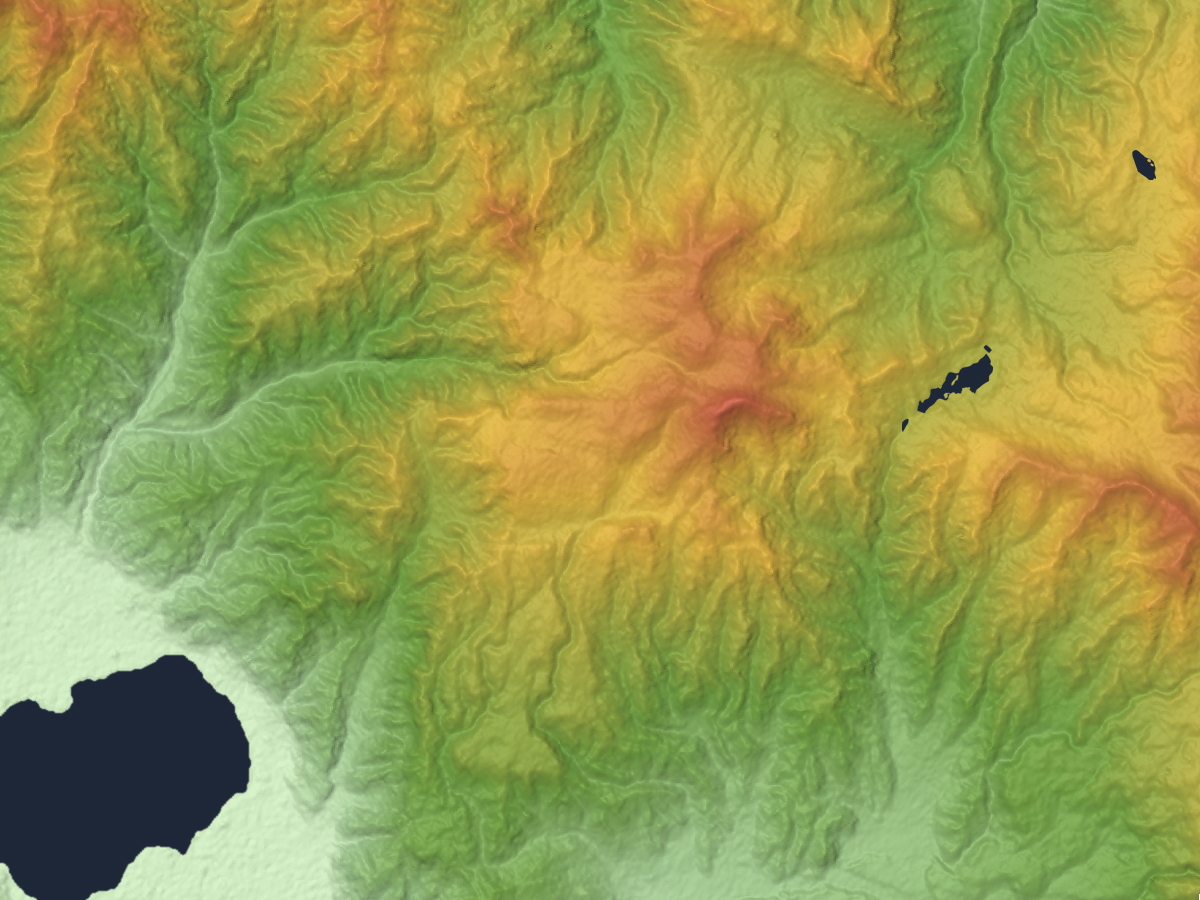
Massif of Kirigamine Volcano

== Access ==
Vehicle access to the bottom of Kirigamine does not require four-wheel drive but snow chains may be necessary if there is heavy snow.

== Gallery ==
Mount Kuruma is a tallest peak

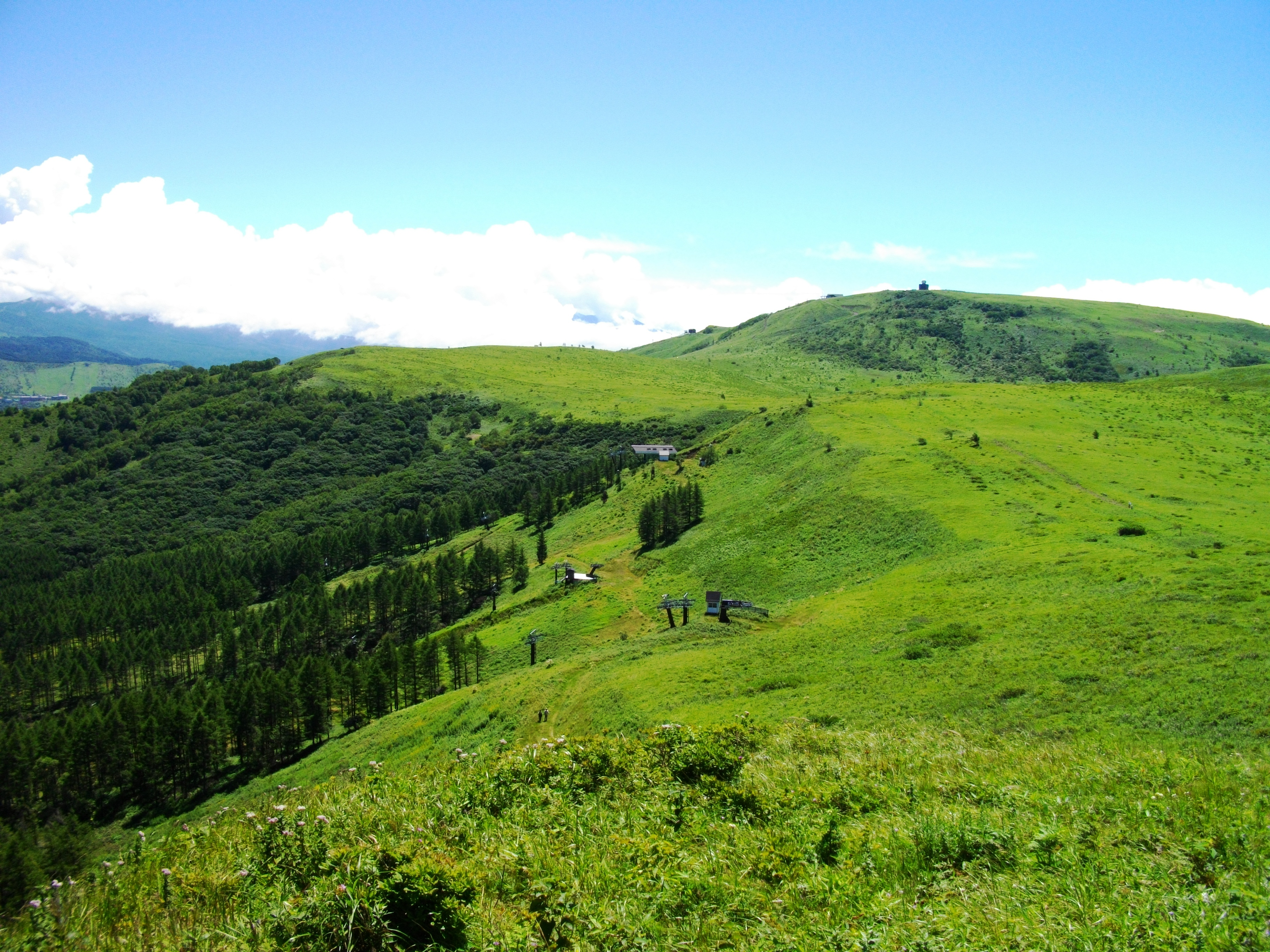
Mount Kuruma from Mount Minaminomimi

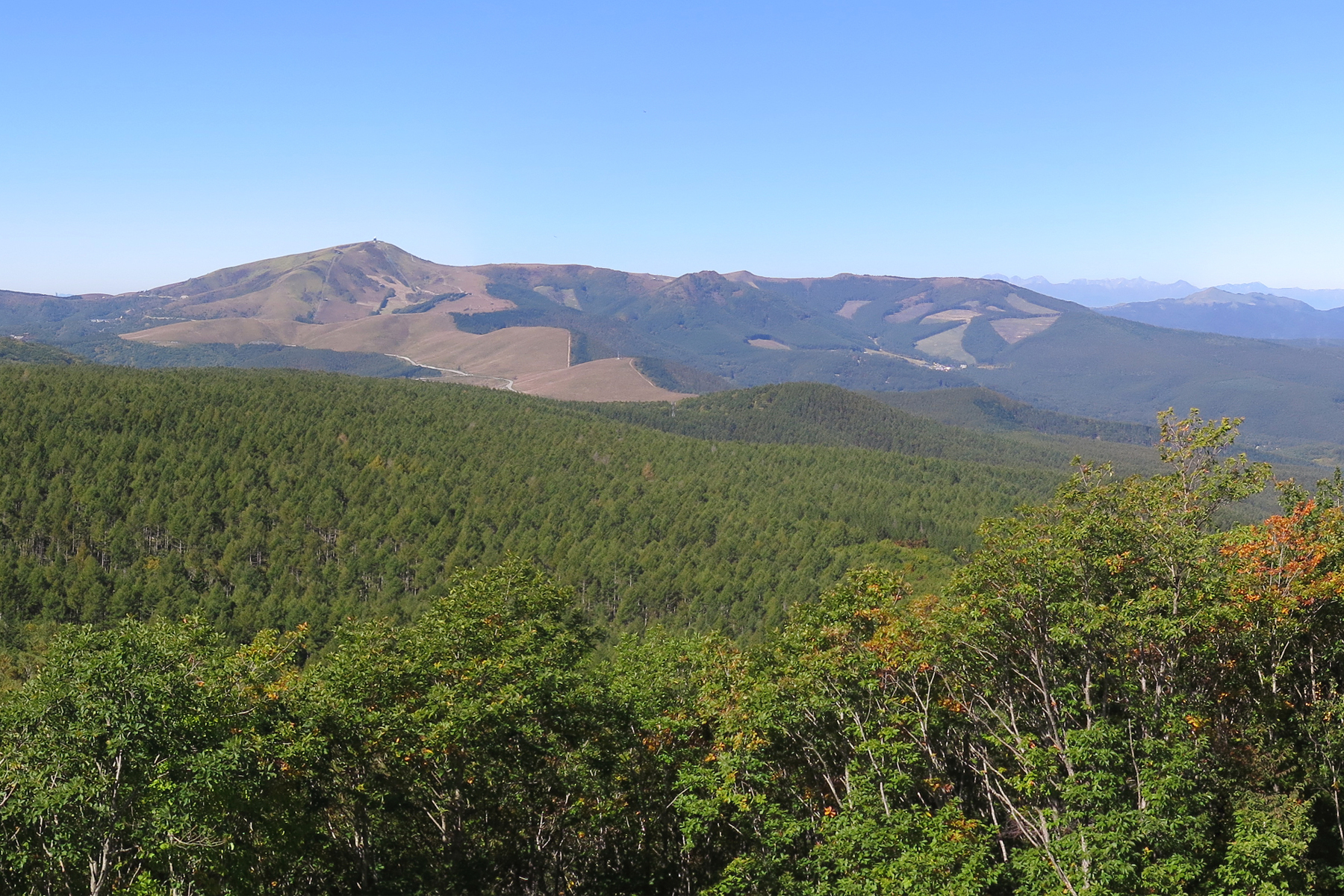
Kirigamine seen from the east.

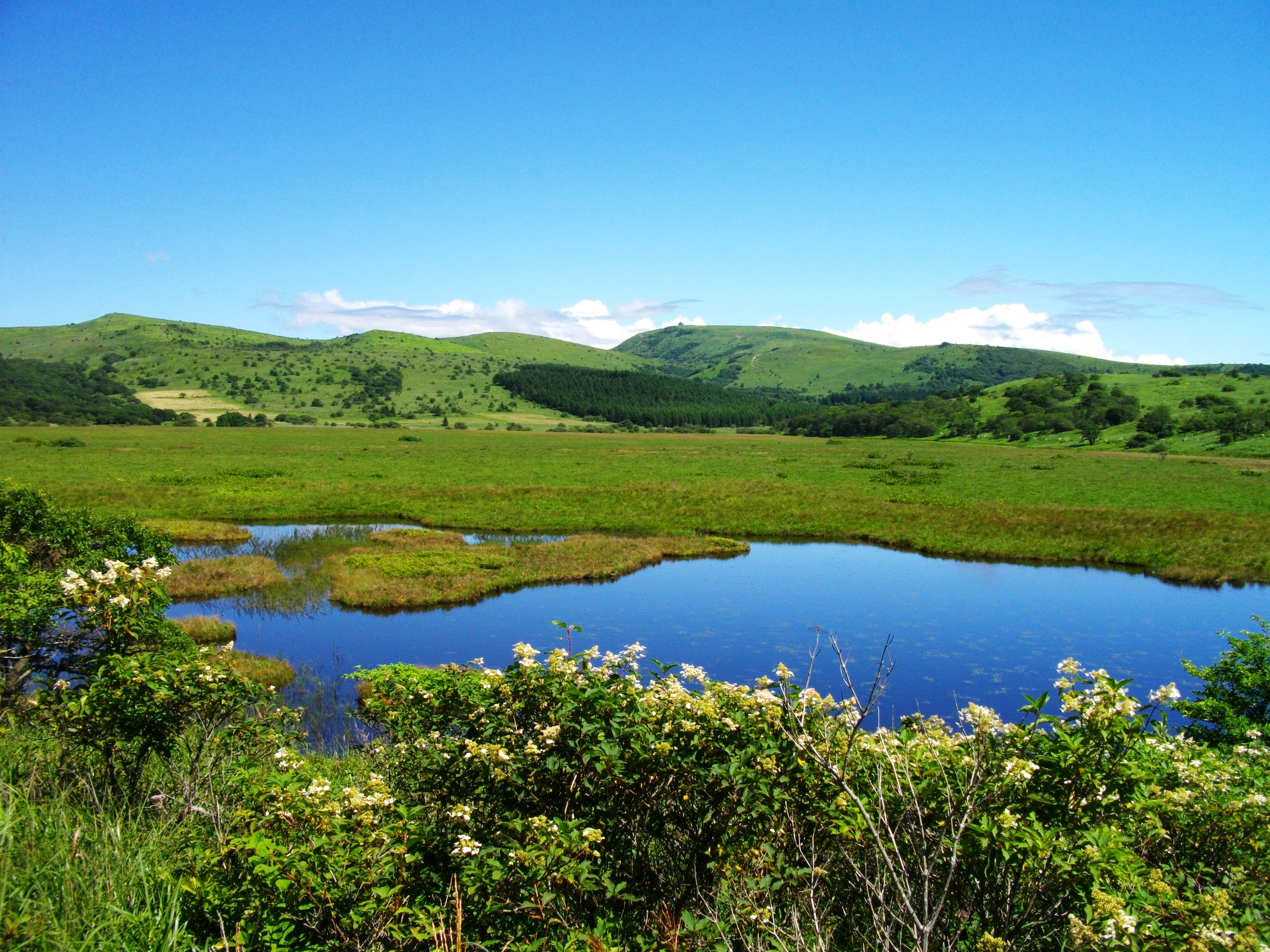
Mount Kirigamine and Yashimagahara Wetland

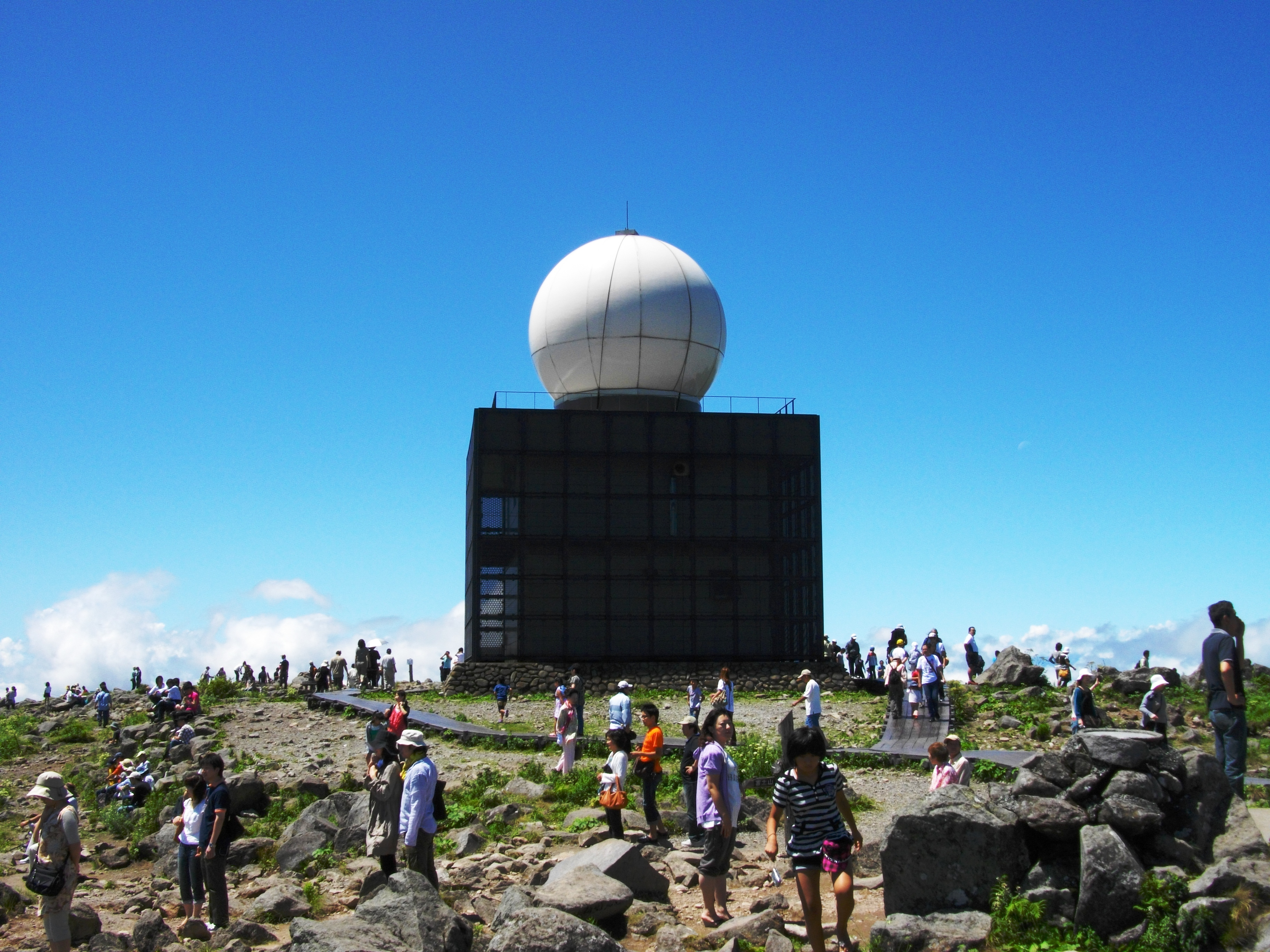
A weather radar site on the top of Mount Kuruma

== See also ==
- List of volcanoes in Japan
- List of mountains in Japan
