= Mount Yoko (Southern Yatsugatake) =

Mountain in Honshū, Japan

- 横岳
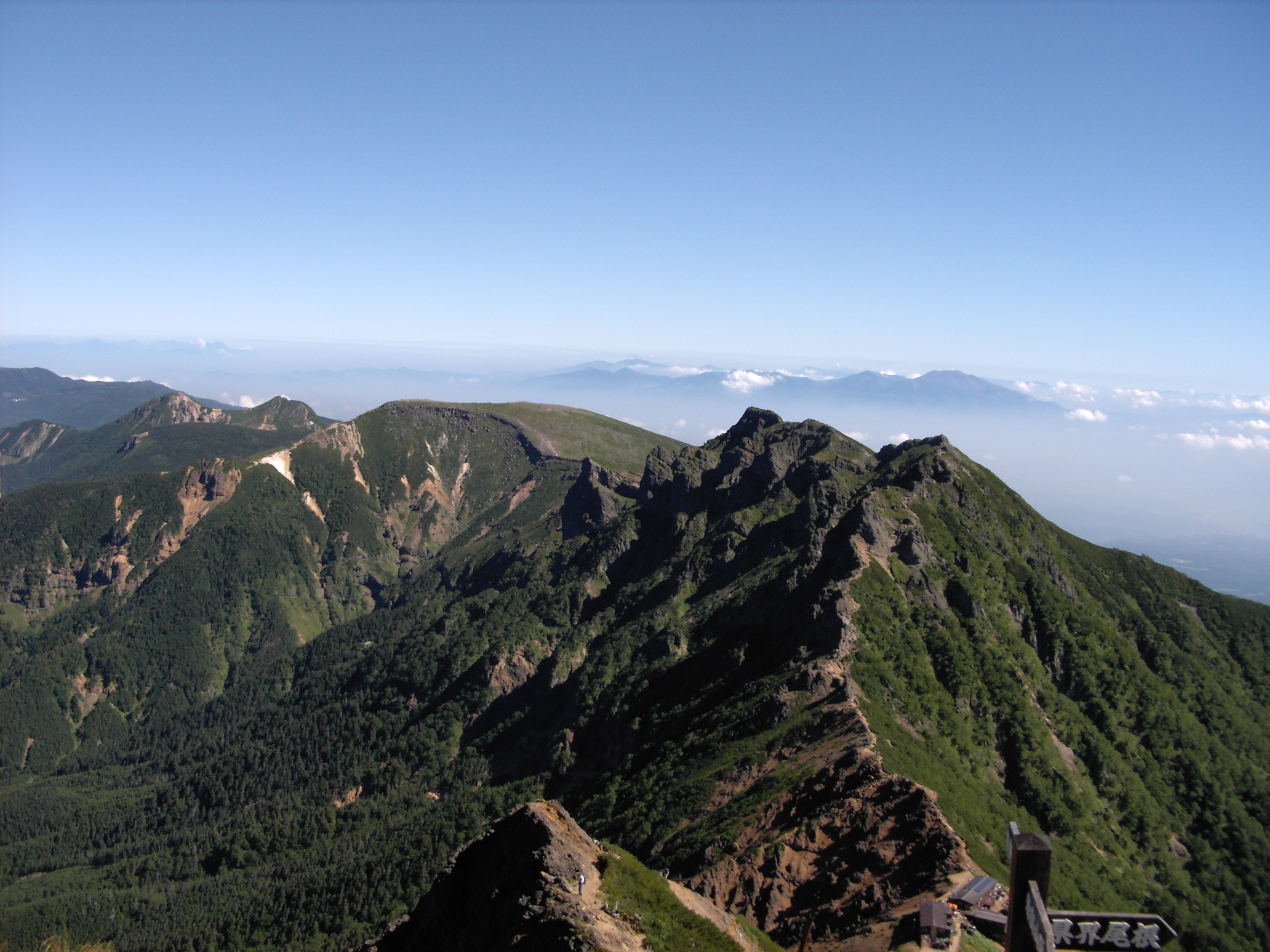
- Mount Iō and Mount Yoko, from Mount Aka. (August 2007)

Highest point
- Elevation: 2,829 m (9,281 ft)
- Prominence: 140 m (460 ft)
- Parent peak: Mount Aka
- Listing: List of mountains and hills of Japan by height
- Coordinates: 35°58′59″N 138°22′27″E

Naming
- Language of name: Japanese

Geography
- Location within Japan
- Location: Honshū, Japan
- Parent range: Southern Yatsugatake Volcanic Group
- Topo map(s): Geographical Survey Institute 25000:1 八ヶ岳西部, 25000:1 八ヶ岳東部, 50000:1 八ヶ岳

Geology
- Rock age: Quaternary
- Mountain type: Volcanic
- Volcanic arc: Northeastern Japan Arc

Mount Yoko (横岳, Yoko-dake) is located in the Southern Yatsugatake Volcanic Group of the Yatsugatake Mountains, Honshū, Japan.

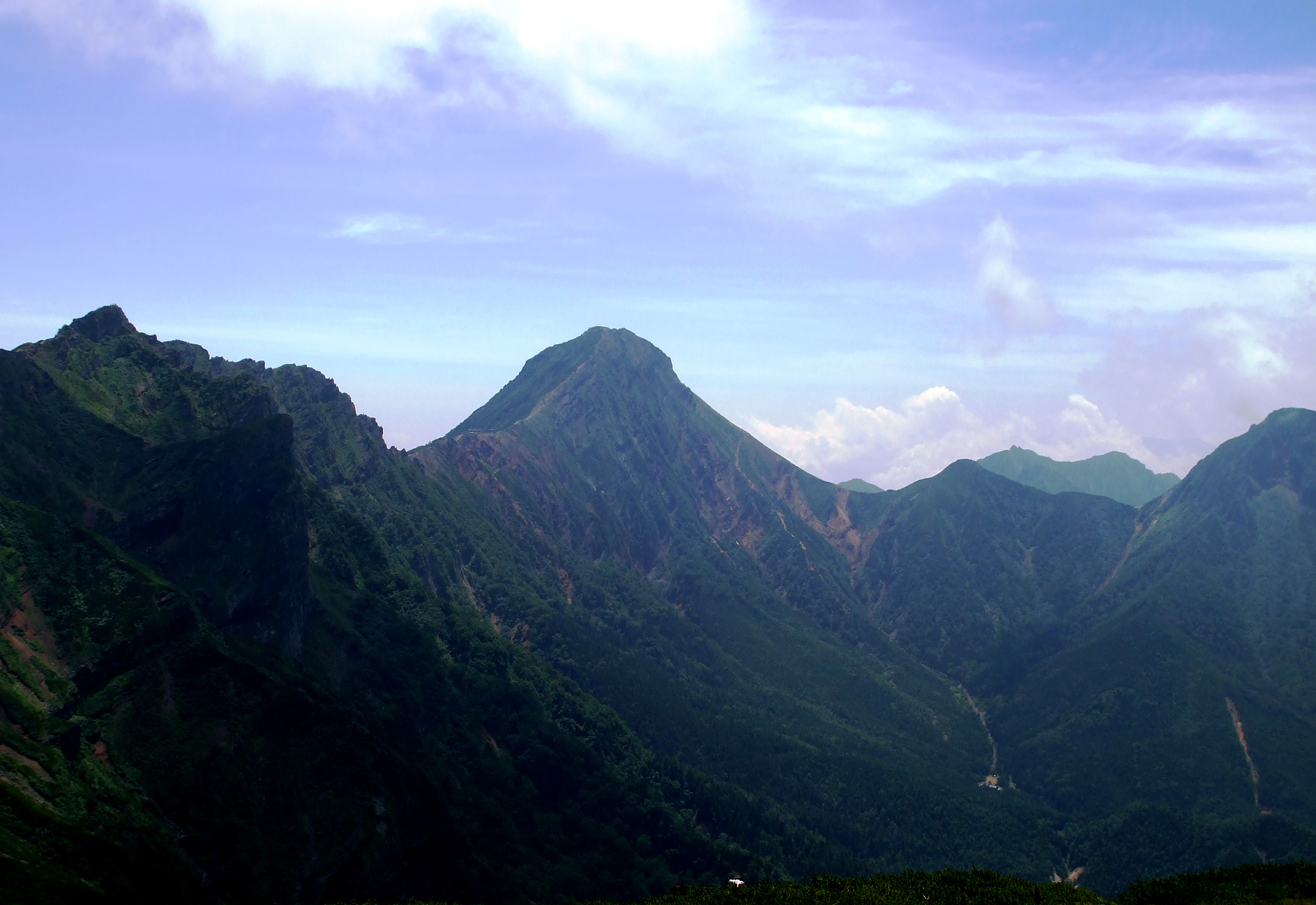
Mount Yoko, Mount Aka, and Mount Amida from Mount Iō. (August 2008)
