= Mount Aka (Yatsugatake) =

Mountain in the country of Japan

- 赤岳
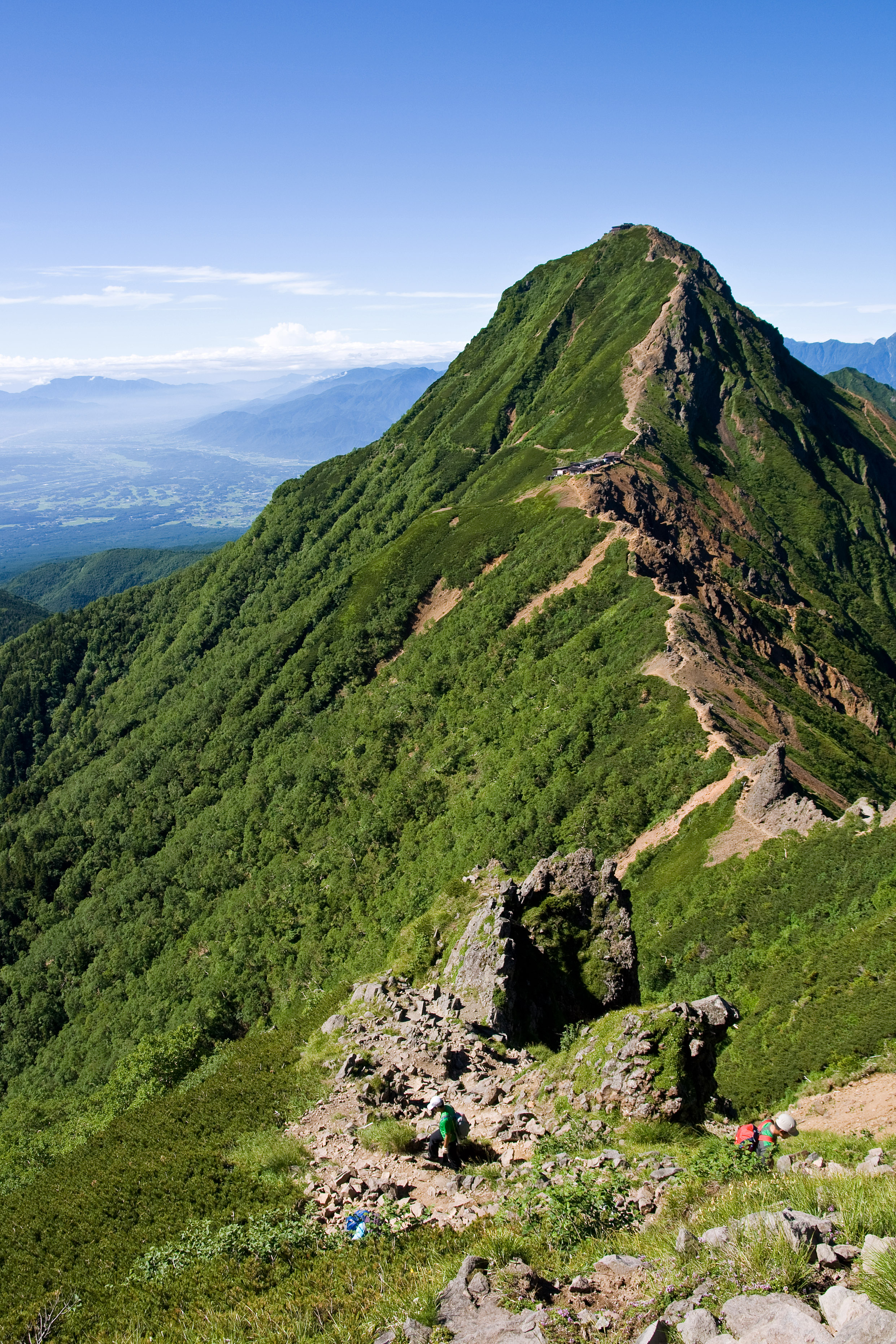
- Mount Aka

Highest point
- Elevation: 2,899 m (9,511 ft)
- Prominence: 1,916 m (6,286 ft)
- Listing: List of mountains and hills of Japan by height Ultra, Ribu
- Coordinates: 35°58′14″N 138°22′12″E

Naming
- English translation: Red Mountain
- Language of name: Japanese
- Pronunciation: Japanese: [akadake]

Geography
- Location within Japan
- Location: On the border of Chino, Hara of Nagano, and Hokuto of Yamanashi in Japan
- Parent range: Southern Yatsugatake Volcanic Group

Geology
- Mountain type: Stratovolcano
- Volcanic arc: Northeastern Japan Arc

Mount Aka (赤岳, Aka-dake) is a 2,899m mountain on the border of Chino, Hara of Nagano, and Hokuto of Yamanashi in Japan. This mountain is the tallest mountain of Yatsugatake Mountains.

== Description ==
Mount Aka is a stratovolcano. This mountain is a center of the Yatsugatake-Chūshin Kōgen Quasi-National Park.

== Climbing route ==
There are several routes to reach to the top of Mount Aka. The most popular route is from Minoto. It takes about four and half hours.

== Access ==
- Minotoguchi Bus Stop of Suwa Bus

== Gallery ==
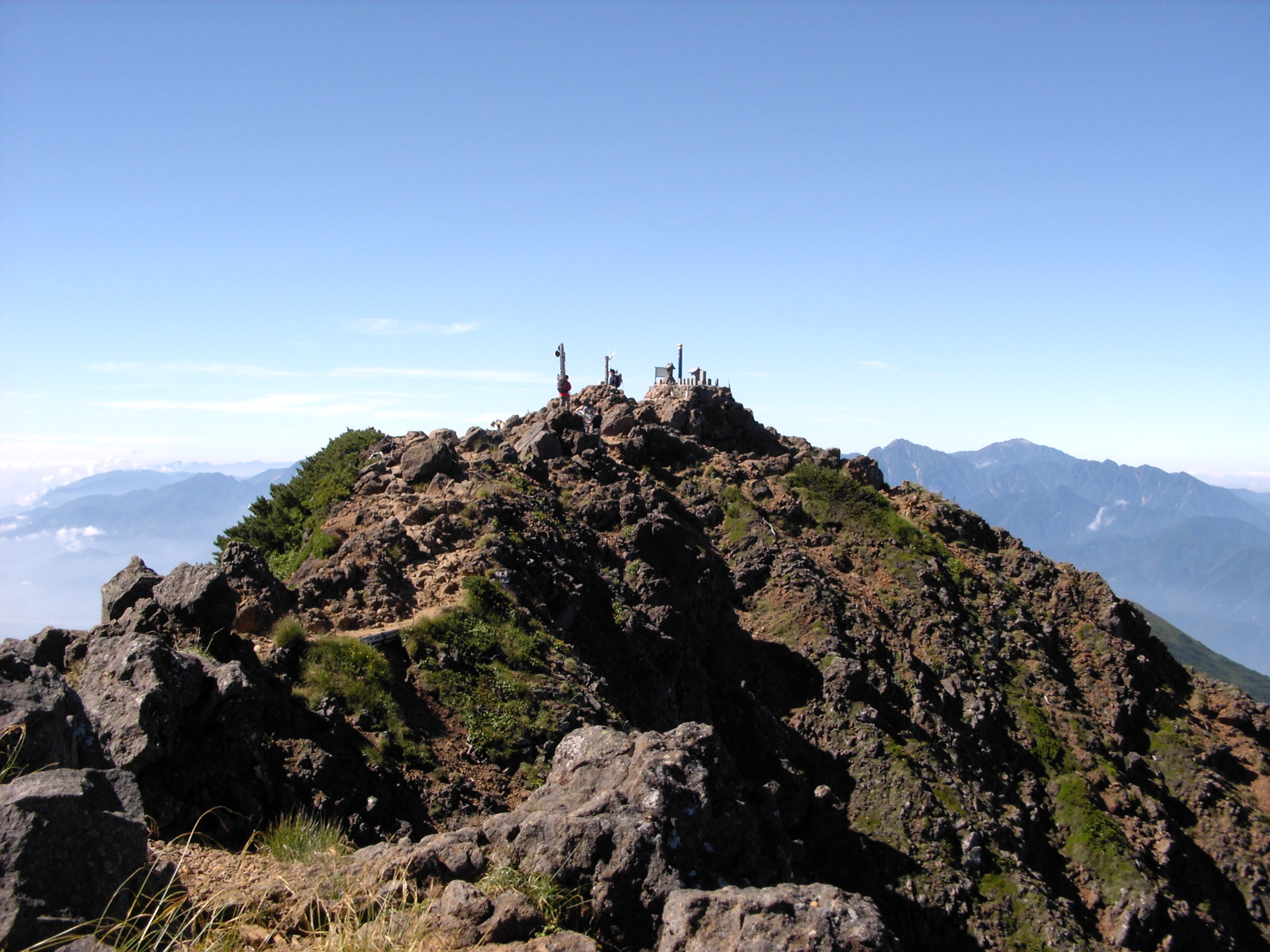
Mount Aka from north side

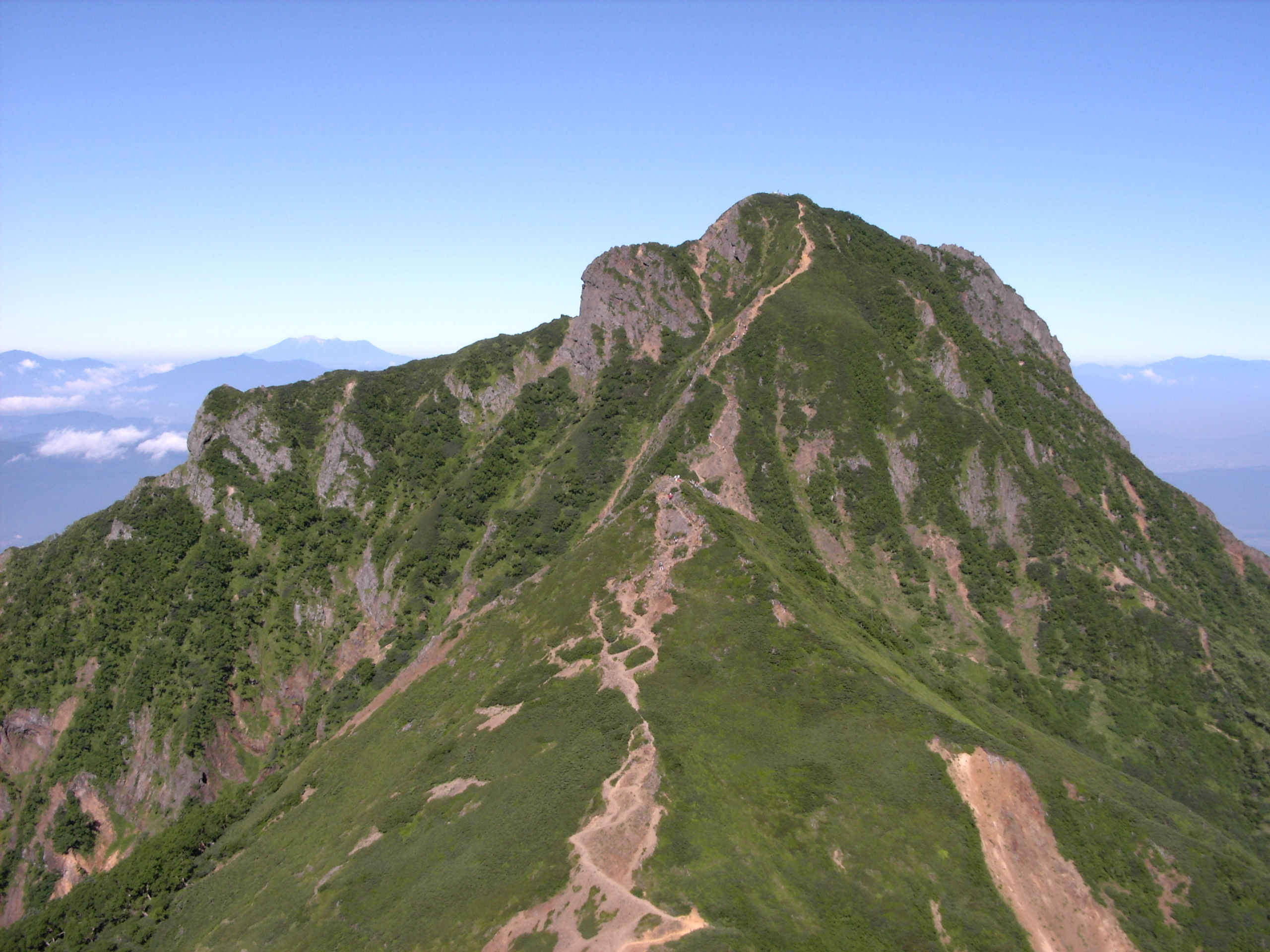
Mount Amida from Mount Aka

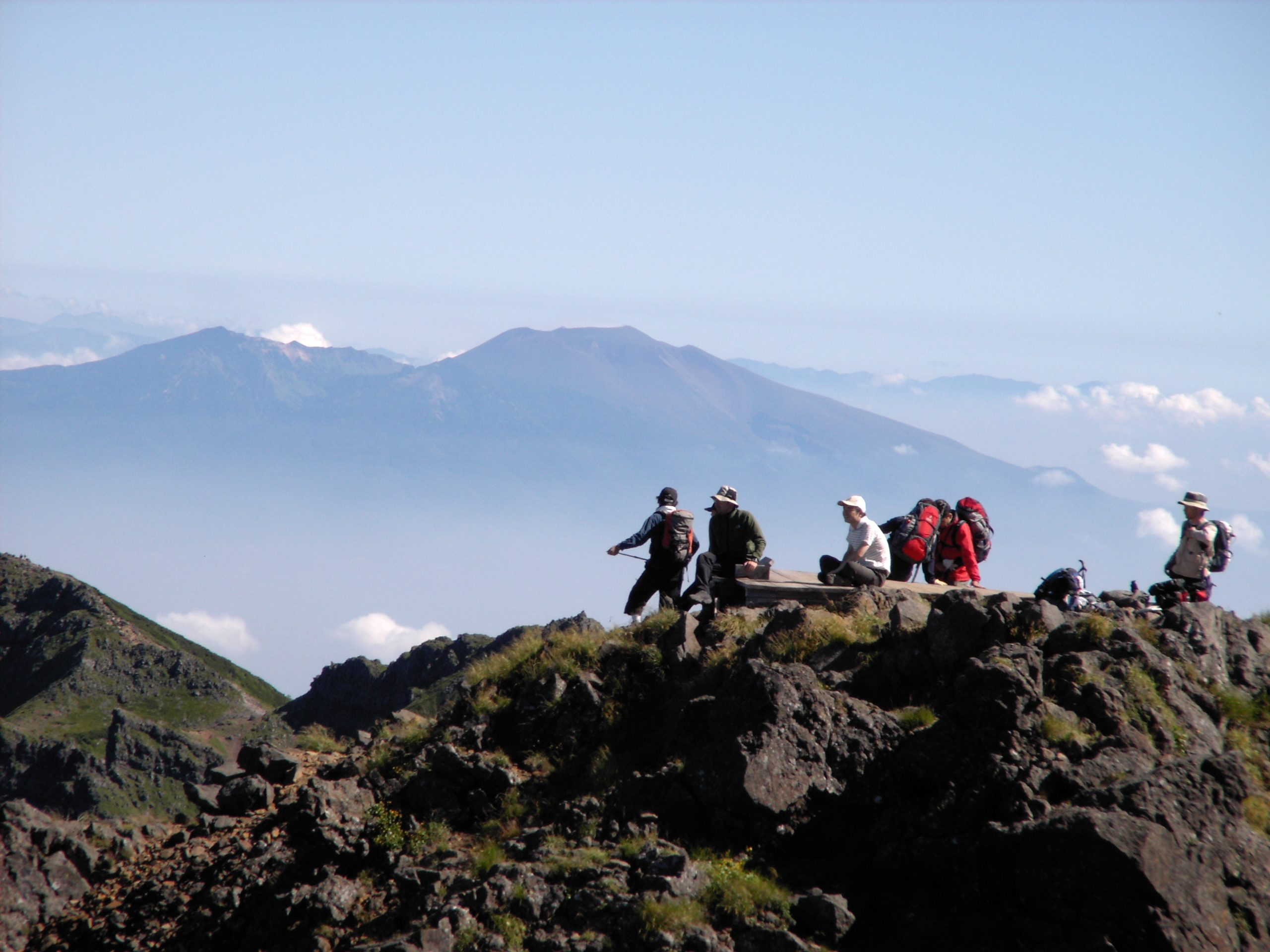
Mount Asama from Mount Aka

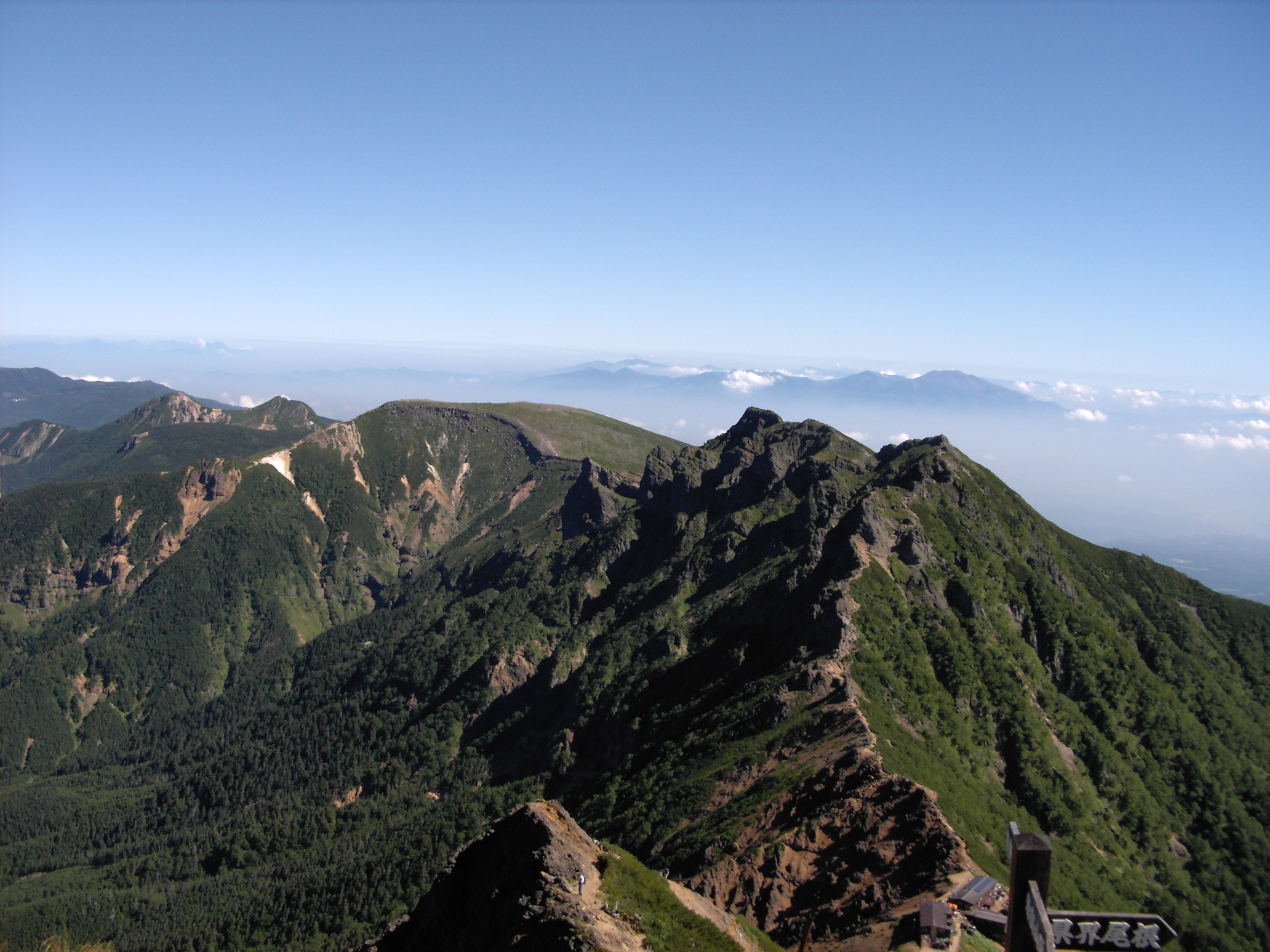
Mount Iō and Mount Yoko from Mount Aka

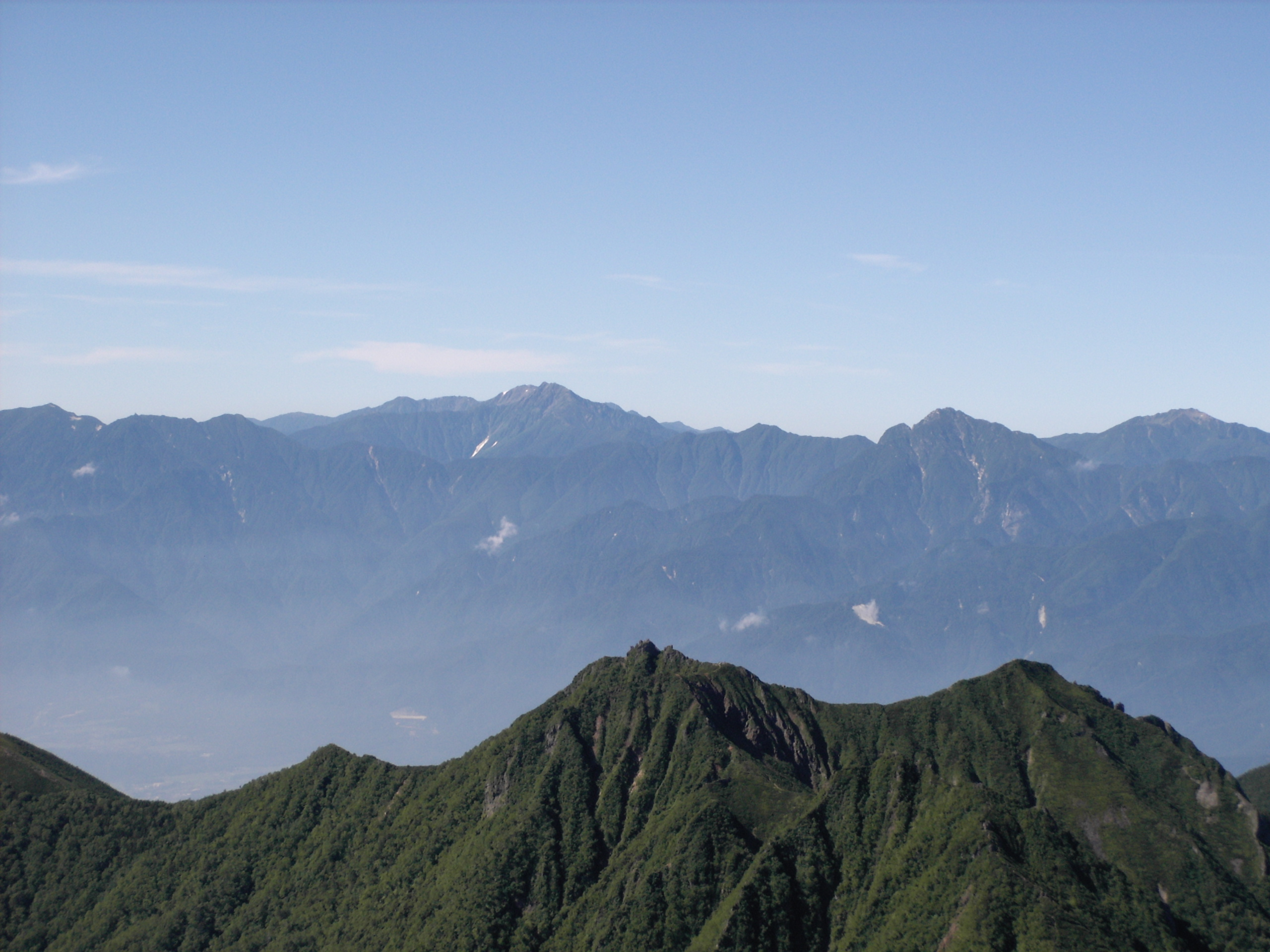
Akaishi Mountains from Mount Aka

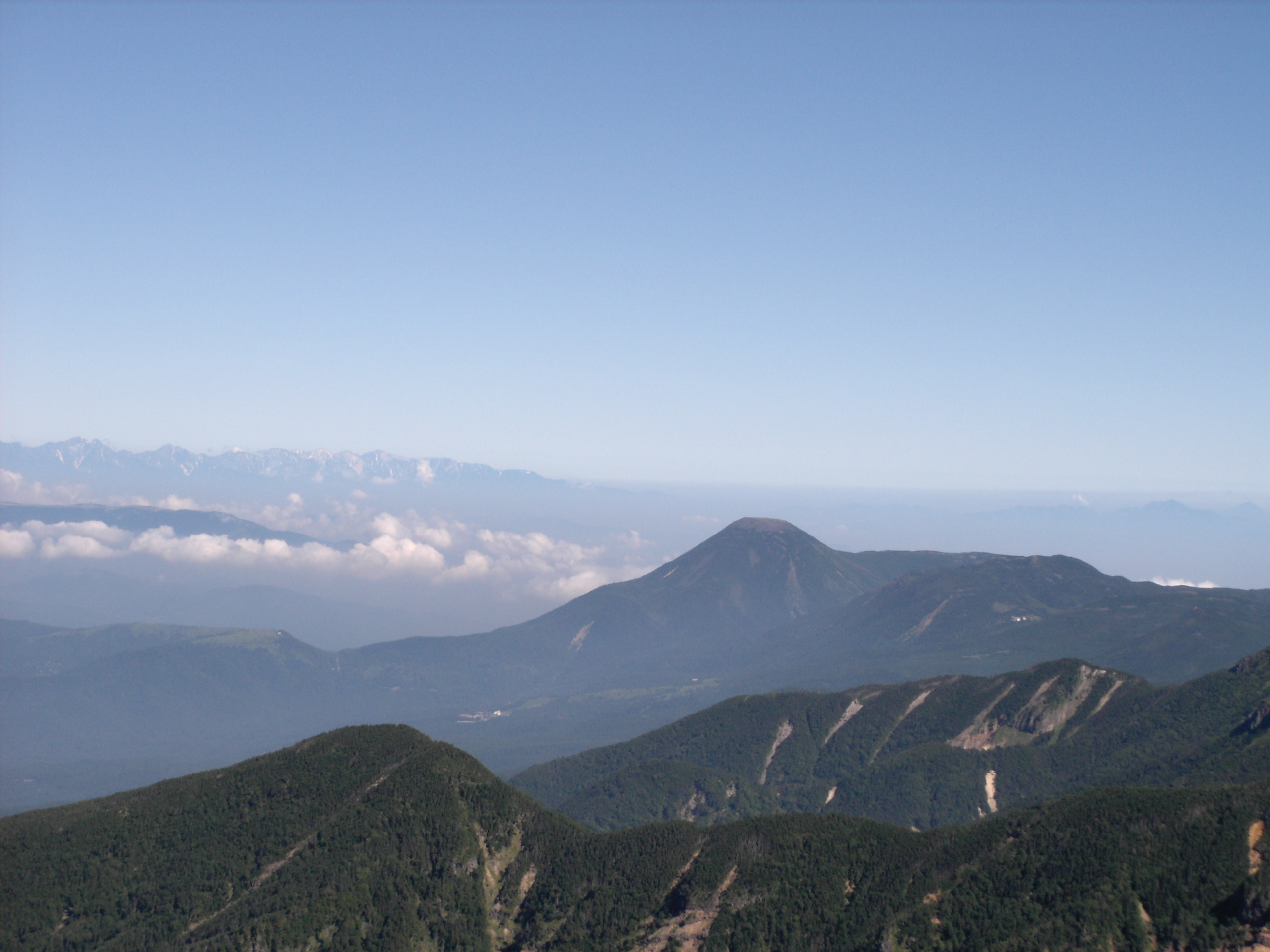
Mount Tateshina and Hida Mountains from Mount Aka

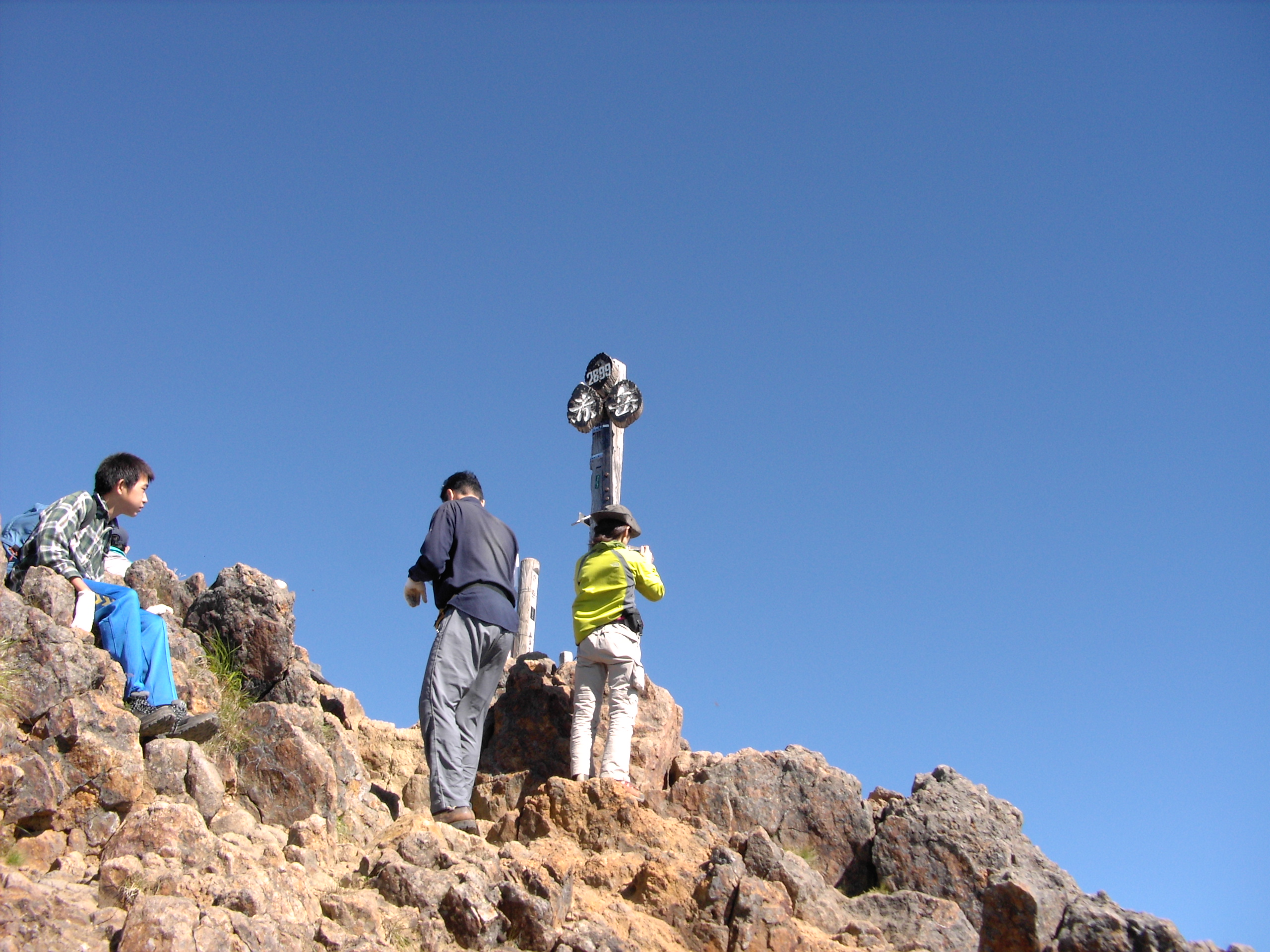
The top of Mount Aka

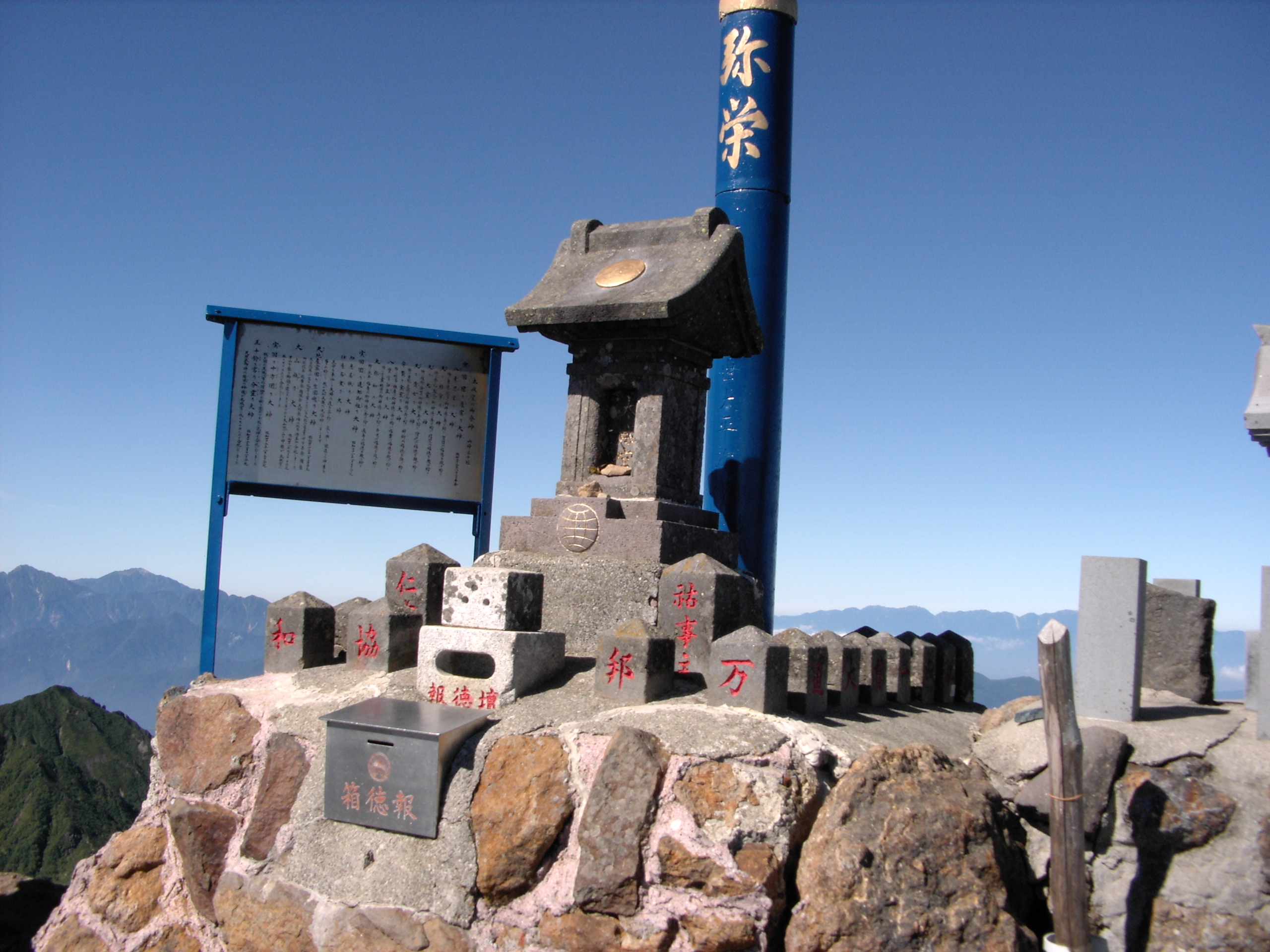
Akadake Shirine at the top of Mount Aka

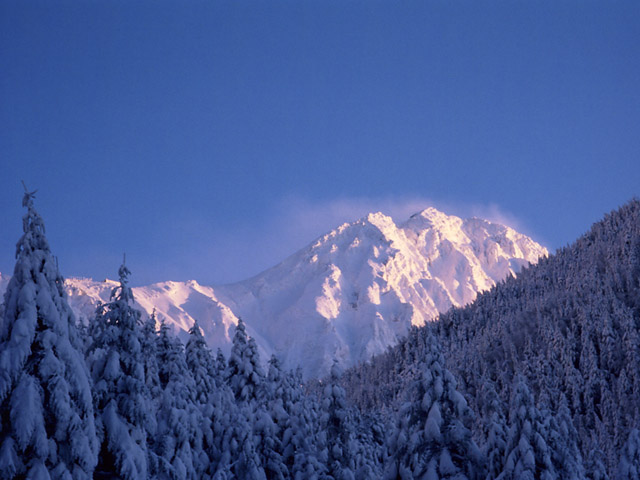
Mount Aka (December 2006)

== See also ==
- List of ultras of Japan
