= Mount Tateshina =

Complex volcano on the island of Honshu, Japan

- 蓼科山
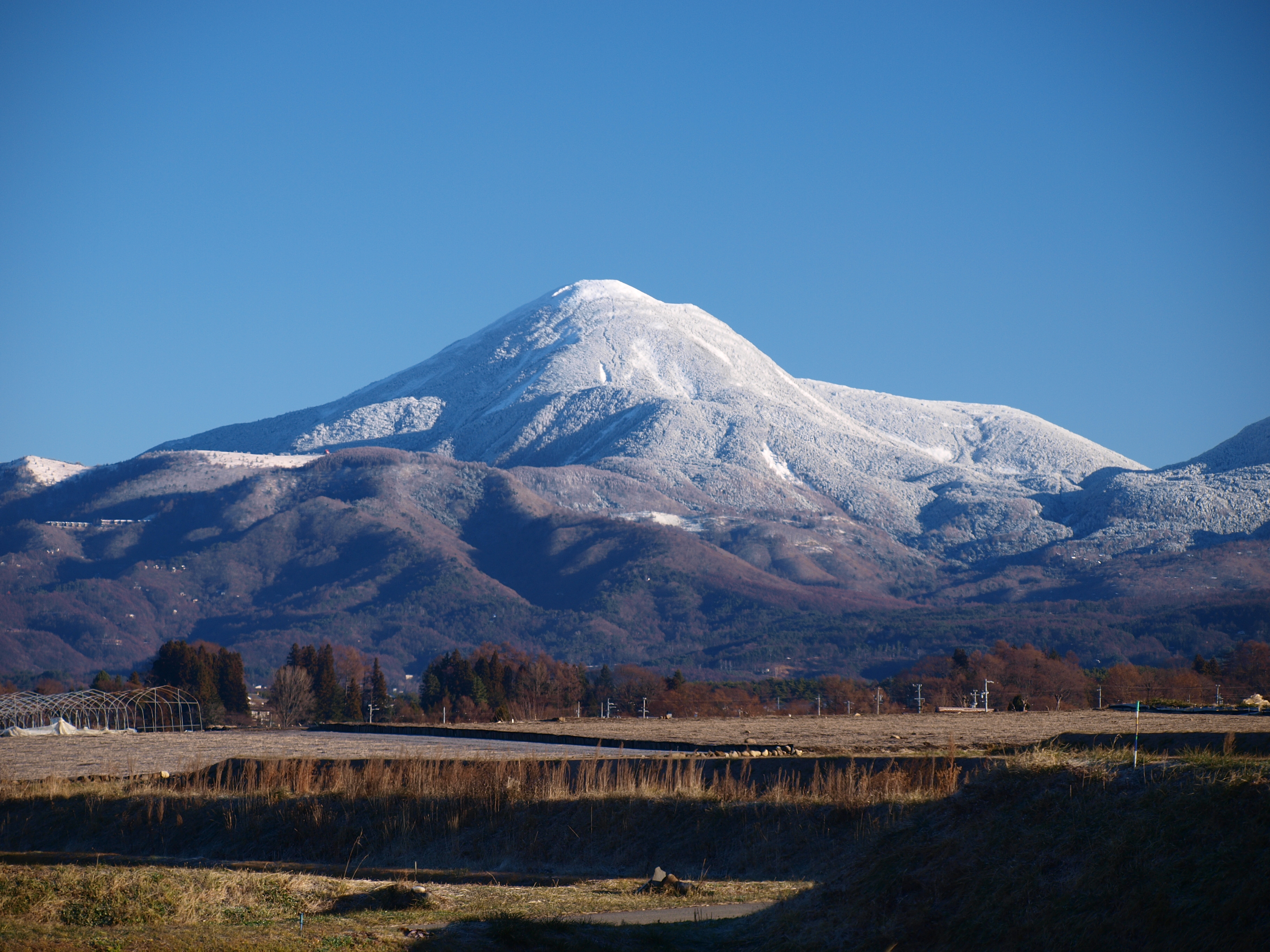
- SSW side

Highest point
- Elevation: 2,530 m (8,300 ft)
- Listing: 100 Famous Japanese Mountains
- Coordinates: 36°6′13″N 138°17′42″E

Naming
- English translation: high mountain of water-peppers
- Language of name: Japanese

Geography
- Location within Japan
- Location: Honshū, Japan
- Parent range: Northern Yatsugatake Volcanic Group

Geology
- Mountain type: Complex volcano
- Last eruption: Unknown

Mount Tateshina (蓼科山, Tateshina-yama) also Suwa Fuji is a complex volcano located on the border of the municipalities of Chino and Tateshina in Nagano Prefecture, Japan.

It has an elevation of 2,530 m (8,301 ft). This mountain is one of the 100 Famous Japanese Mountains.

== Outline ==
Mount Tateshina is a typical complex volcano. About the origin of the name of this mountain, tate means water-pepper, and shina means steps or high places. So Tateshina is literally a high mountain of water-peppers. The other name of this mountain Suwa Fuji, literally, Mount Fuji of the Suwa region.

Mount Tateshina is an important part of Yatsugatake-Chūshin Kōgen Quasi-National Park.

== Route ==
Routes to climb up Mount Tateshina are well-developed. The most popular route is to start from the Nanagome parking lot.

== Gallery ==
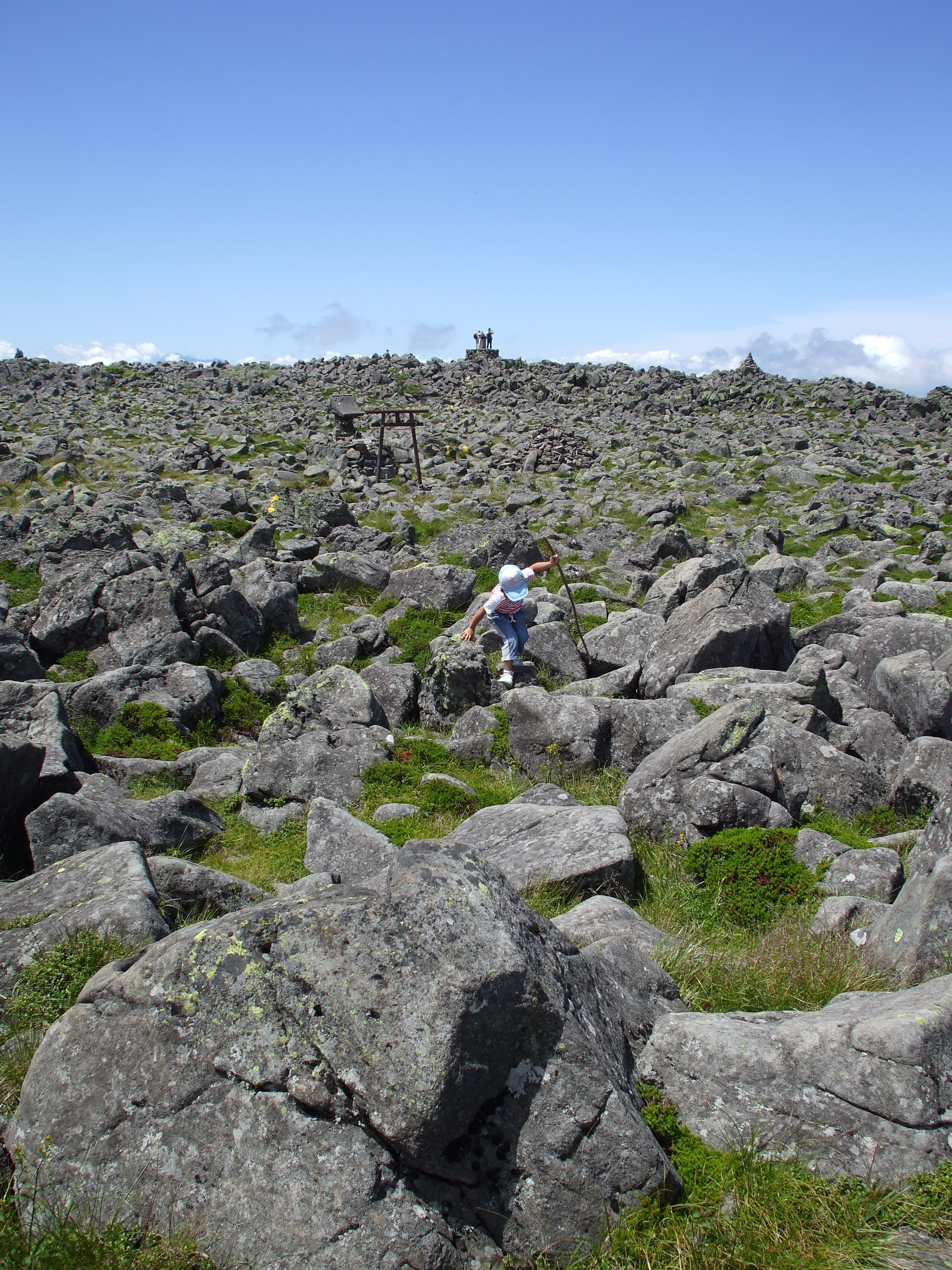
Ruin of the volcanic crater of Mount Tateshina

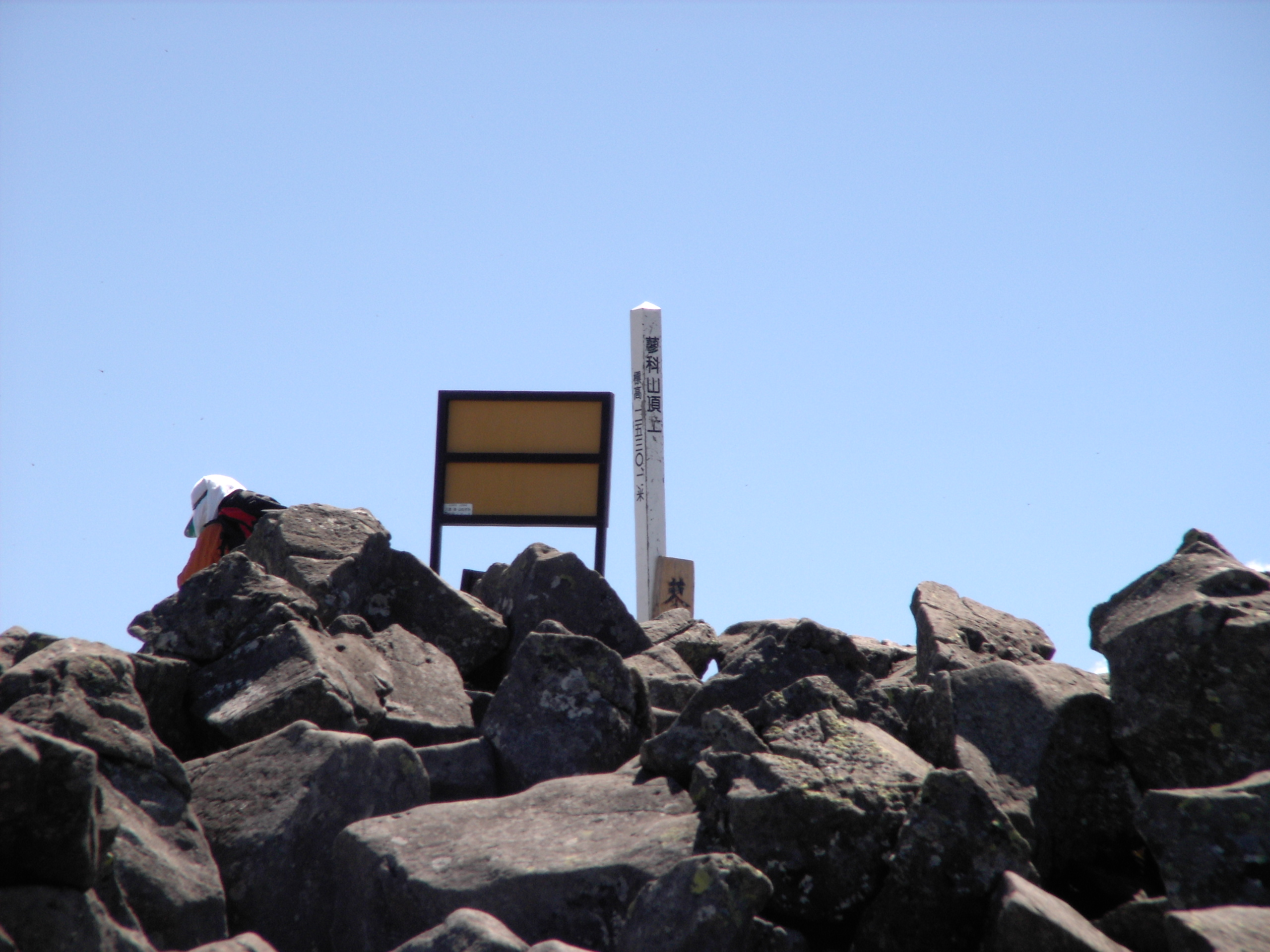
Top of Mount Tateshina

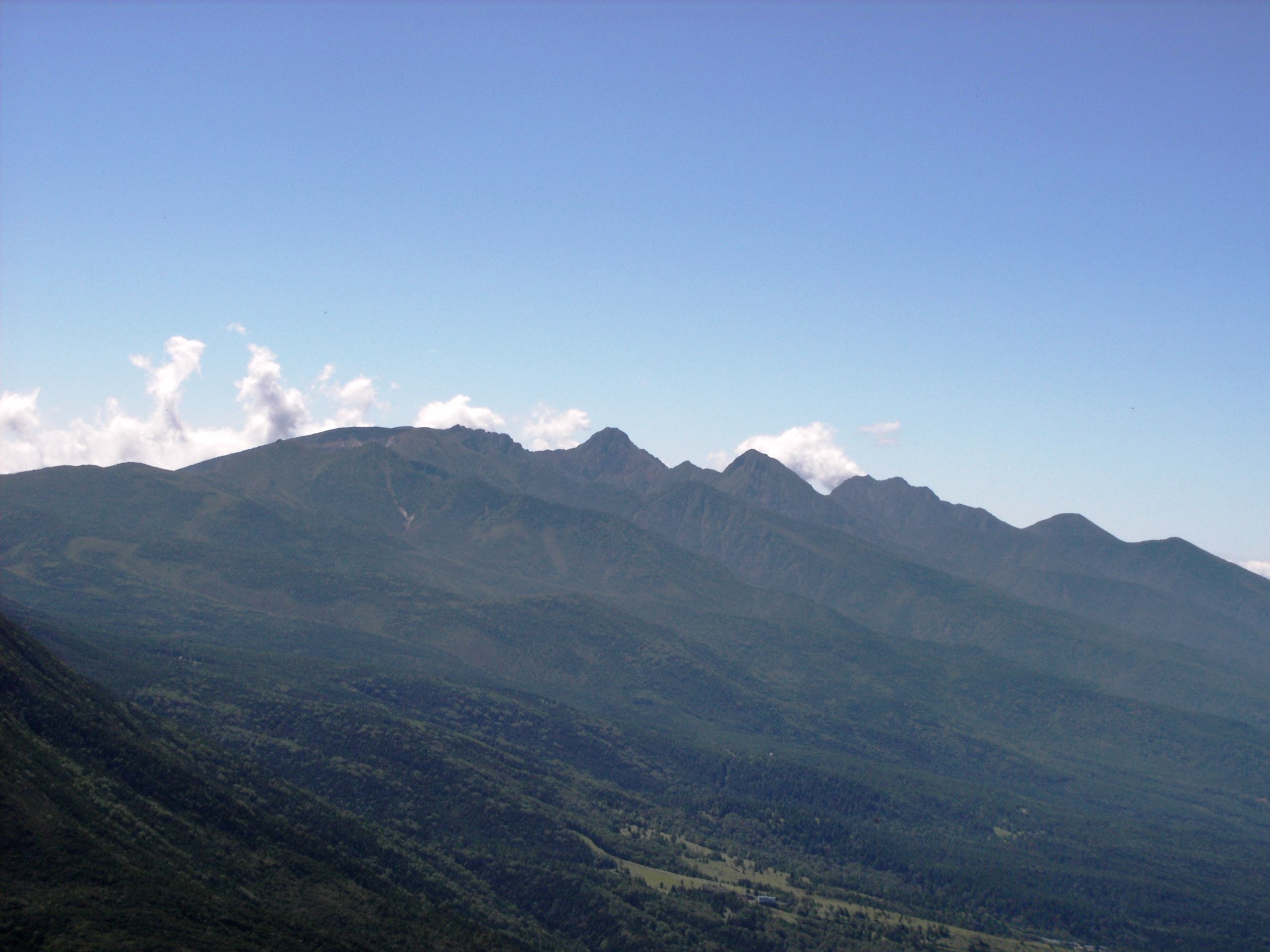
Yatsugatake Mountains from Mount Tateshina

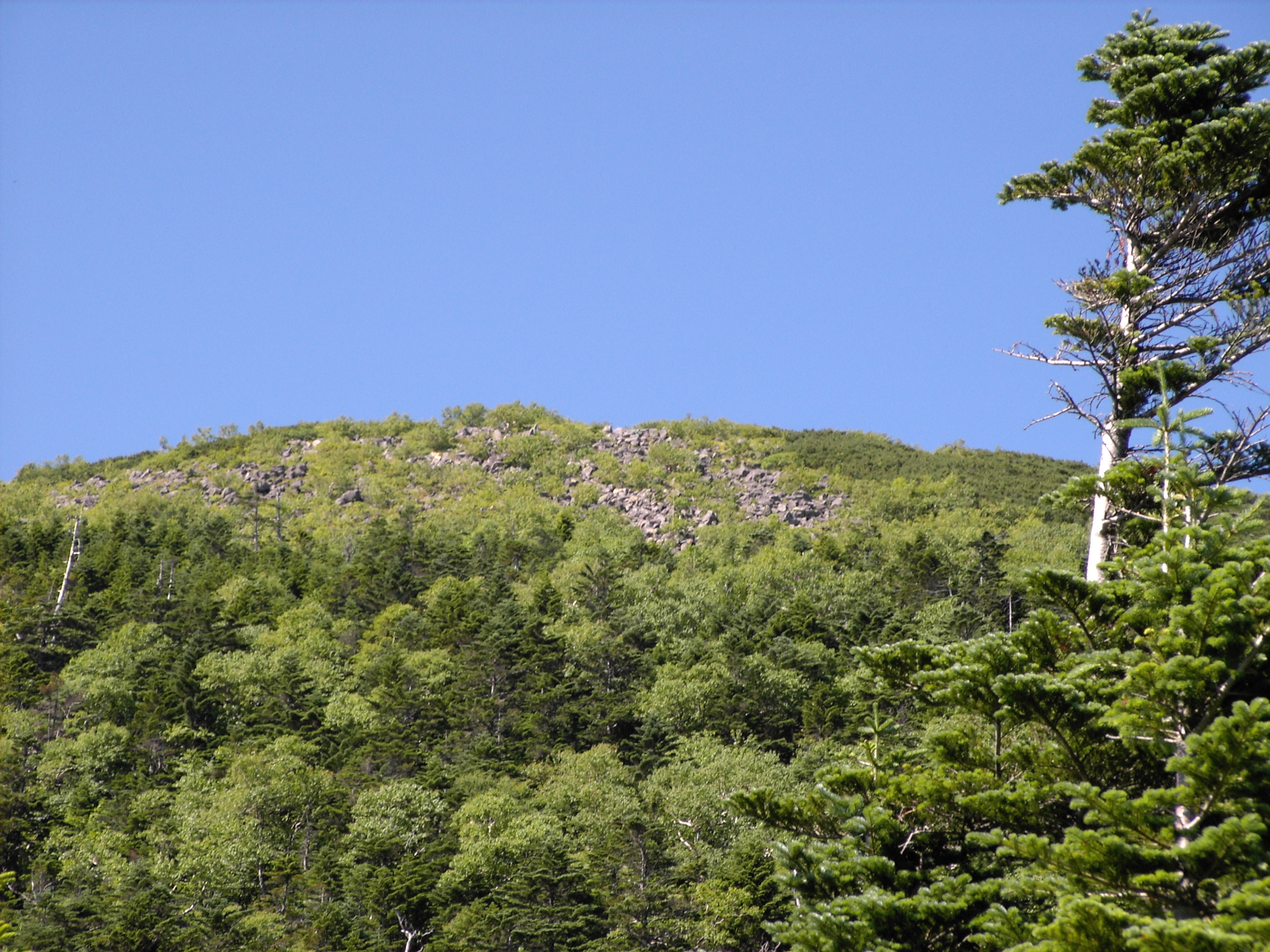
Mount Tateshina from the middle of the mountain

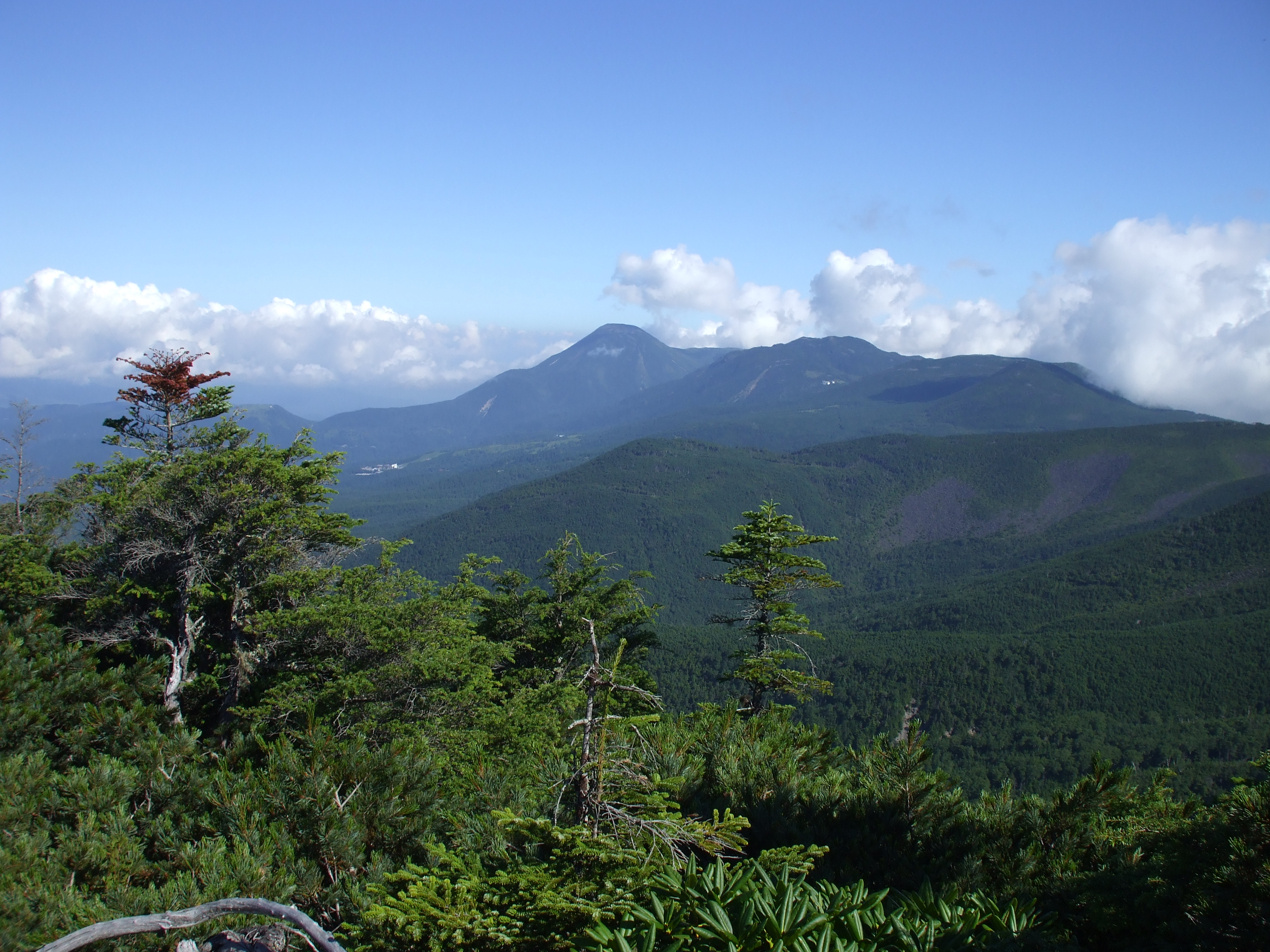
Mount Tateshina from Mount Tengu

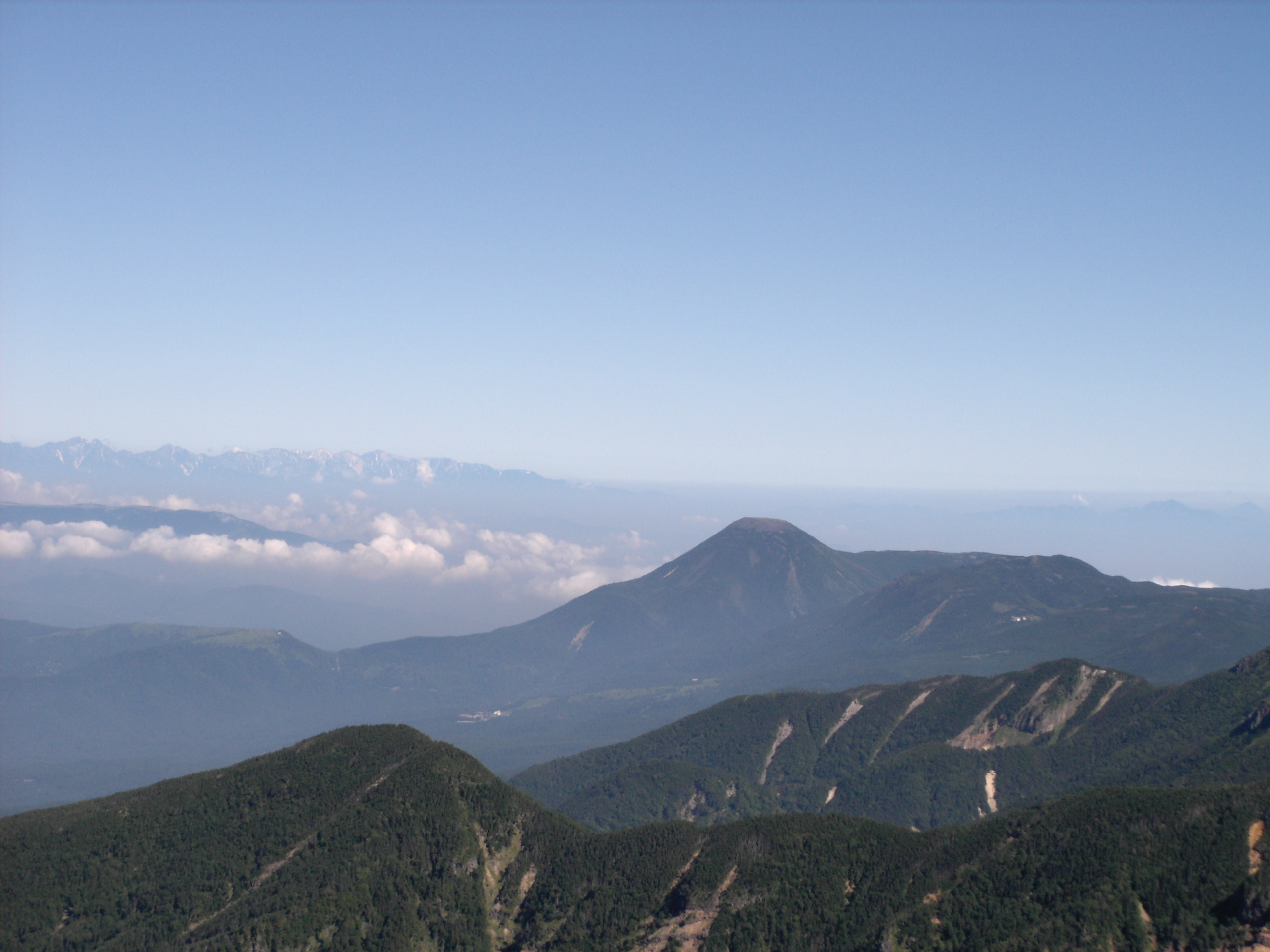
Mount Tateshina from Mount Aka

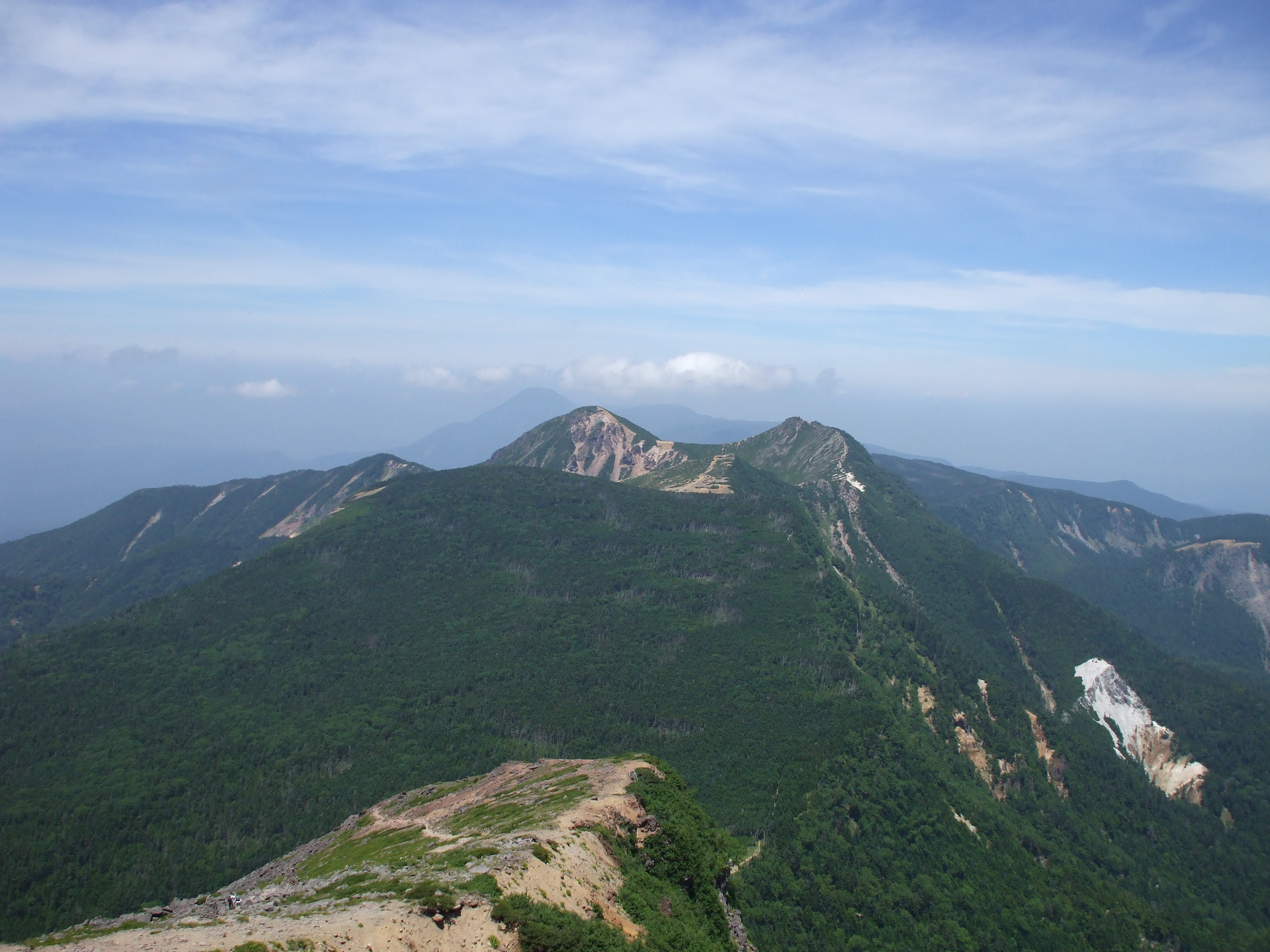
Mount Tateshina from Mount Iō

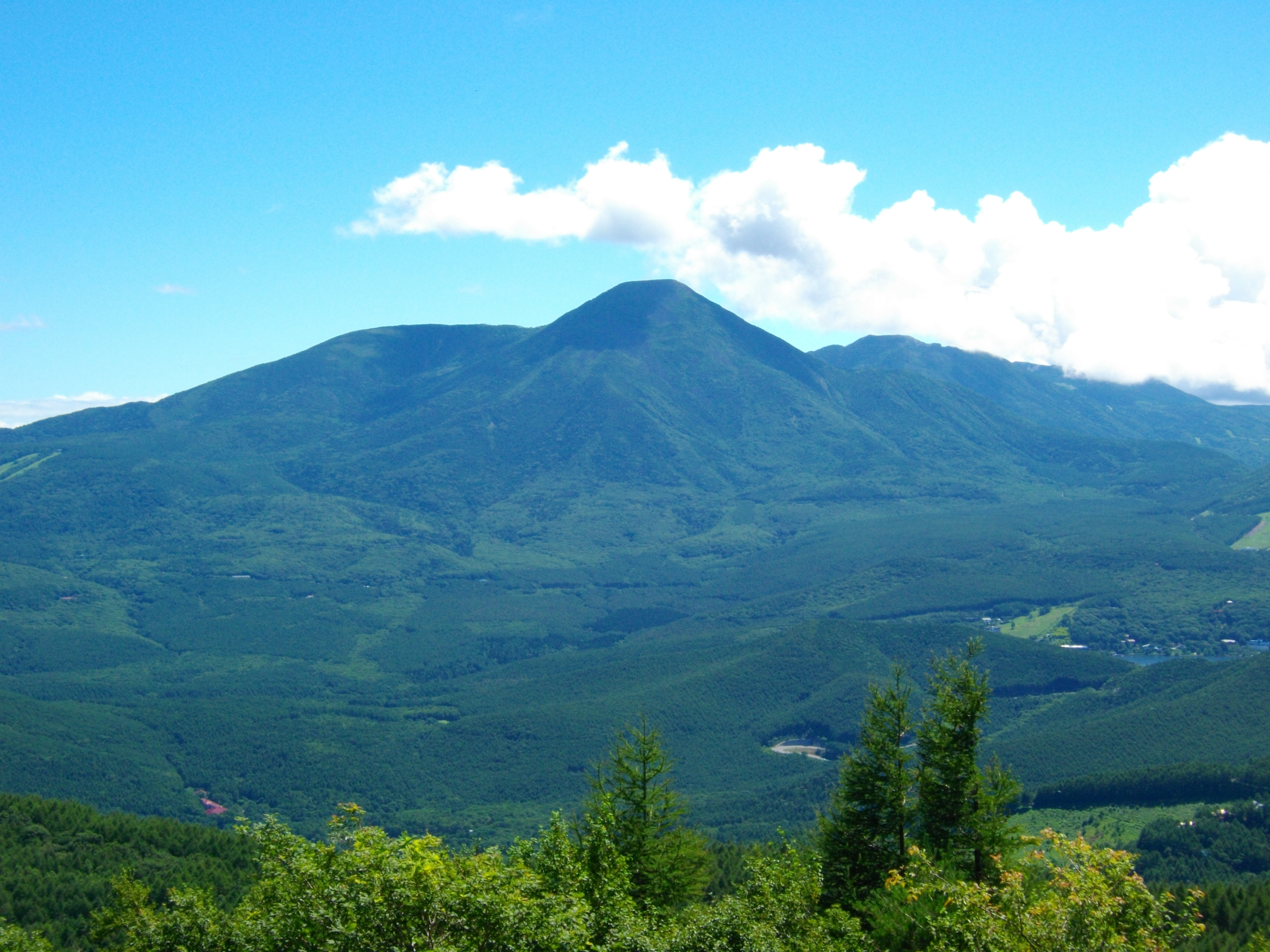
Mount Tateshina in August

== See also ==
- List of volcanoes in Japan
- List of mountains in Japan
