= Mount Iō (Yatsugatake) =

Volcanic mountain in Japan

- 硫黄岳
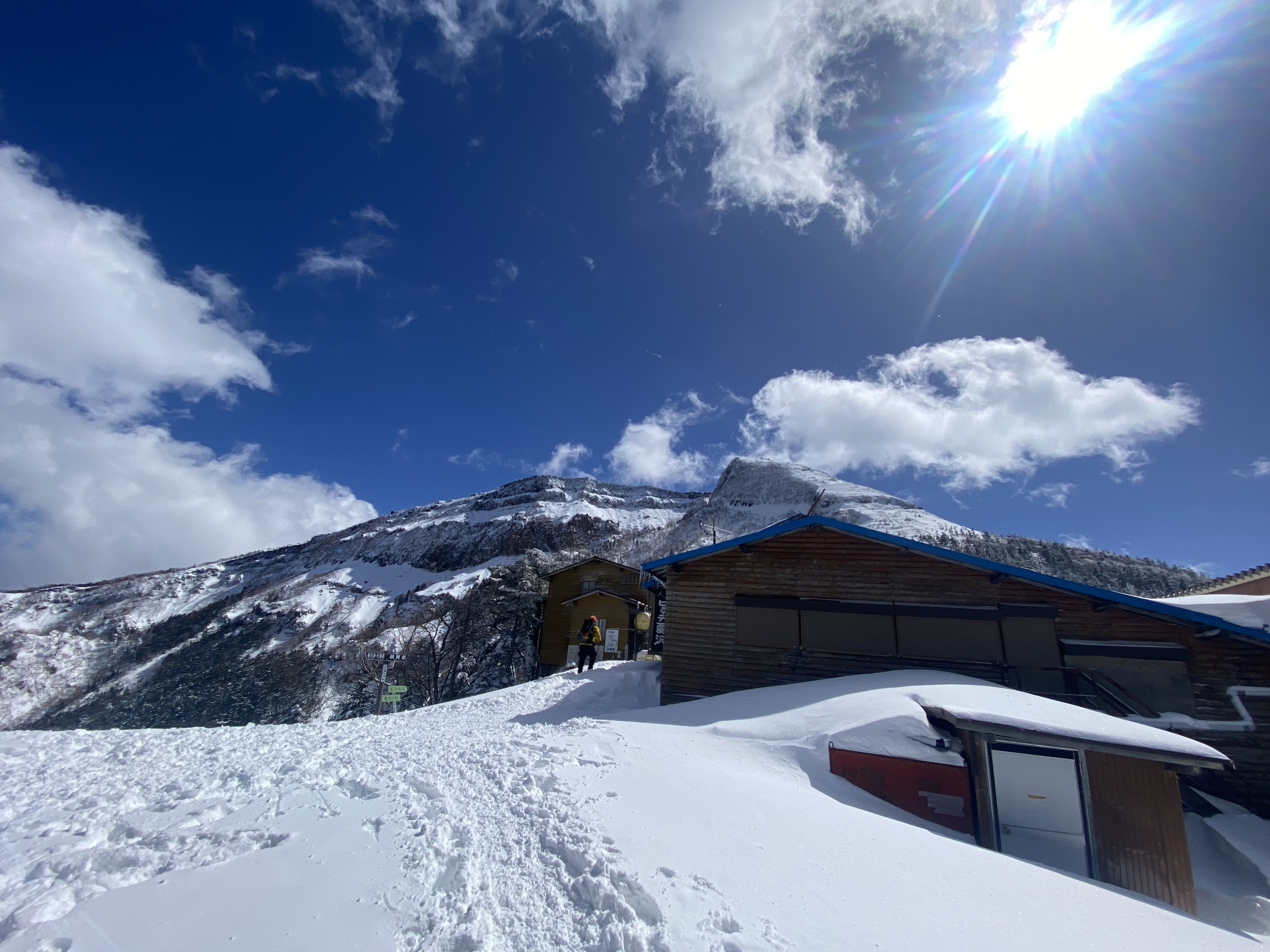
- Mt Io taken from Natsuzawa Pass in March 2024

Highest point
- Elevation: 2,760 m (9,060 ft)
- Prominence: 110
- Listing: List of mountains and hills of Japan by height
- Coordinates: 35°59′55″N 138°22′11″E

Naming
- English translation: Sulphur Mountain
- Language of name: Japanese
- Pronunciation: [ioːdake]

Geography
- Location: On the border of Chino and Minamimaki of Nagano in Japan
- Parent range: Southern Yatsugatake Volcanic Group

Geology
- Mountain type: Stratovolcano

Mount Iō (硫黄岳, Iō-dake) is a mountain on the border of Chino and Minamimaki, Nagano Prefecture, Japan. This mountain is one of the major mountains of Yatsugatake Mountains. Mount Iō literally means, sulphur mountain.

== Outline ==
Mount Iō is a stratovolcano in Southern Yatsugatake Volcanic Group, with sharp cliffs on both the northern and southern side. This mountain belongs to the Yatsugatake-Chūshin Kōgen Quasi-National Park.

In 100 Famous Japanese Mountains, Kyūya Fukada mentions the loss of a younger climbing mate, Kyoichi Yoshimura, who fell to his death while descending the northern cliffs of Mt Iō. The incident happened when Fukada was a student at Tokyo Imperial University.

== Mountaineering ==
This mountain is one of the major mountains in the Yatsugatake Mountains, and is considered an easy climb for most climbers to reach to the top. The summit is accessible year-round but winter speciality climbing gear is necessary from October through April.

One of the easiest routes is from Sakuradaira (櫻平), 1,894 m (6,214 ft), and takes approximately 6 hours. From Sakuradaira, the climb is approximately 5 km, and passes Natsusawa Kosen (夏沢鉱泉, Natsuzawa kousen), 2,054 m (6,739 ft), a mountain hut with hot spring that is open year-round, O-ren Hut (オーレン小屋, O-ren goya), 2,316 m (7,598 ft), a seasonly-opened mountain hut, and Natsuzawa Pass (夏沢峠, Natsuzawa touge), 2,423 m (7,949 ft). Sakuradaira is accessible by car, or by shuttle from Chino Station if staying at one of three mountain huts in the Iodake Sanso group, Iodake Mountain Hut, Natsusawa Kosen, Neishi Mountain Hut.

A second route is from Honzawa Onsen (本沢温泉), 2,100 m (6,890 ft), to Natsuzawa Pass. It is also possible to climb from Mount Akadake, the only 100 Famous Mountain in the Yatsugatake Range.

== Access ==
- seasonally from Minotoguchi or Tatsunokan Bus Stop of Alpico Kōtsū from Chino Station
- Sakuradaira (car parking available)

== Gallery ==
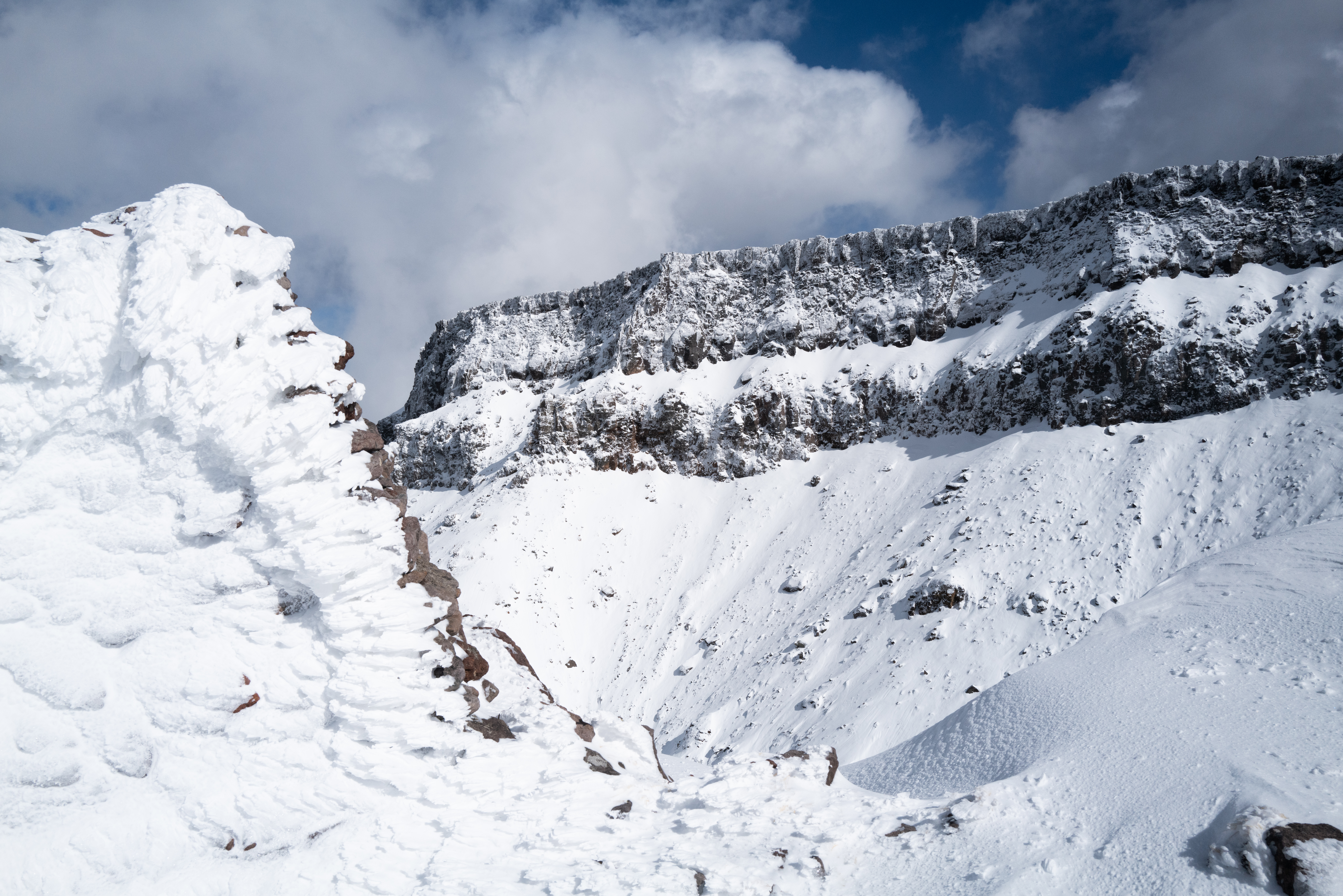
The northern cliff of Mt Io in March 2024

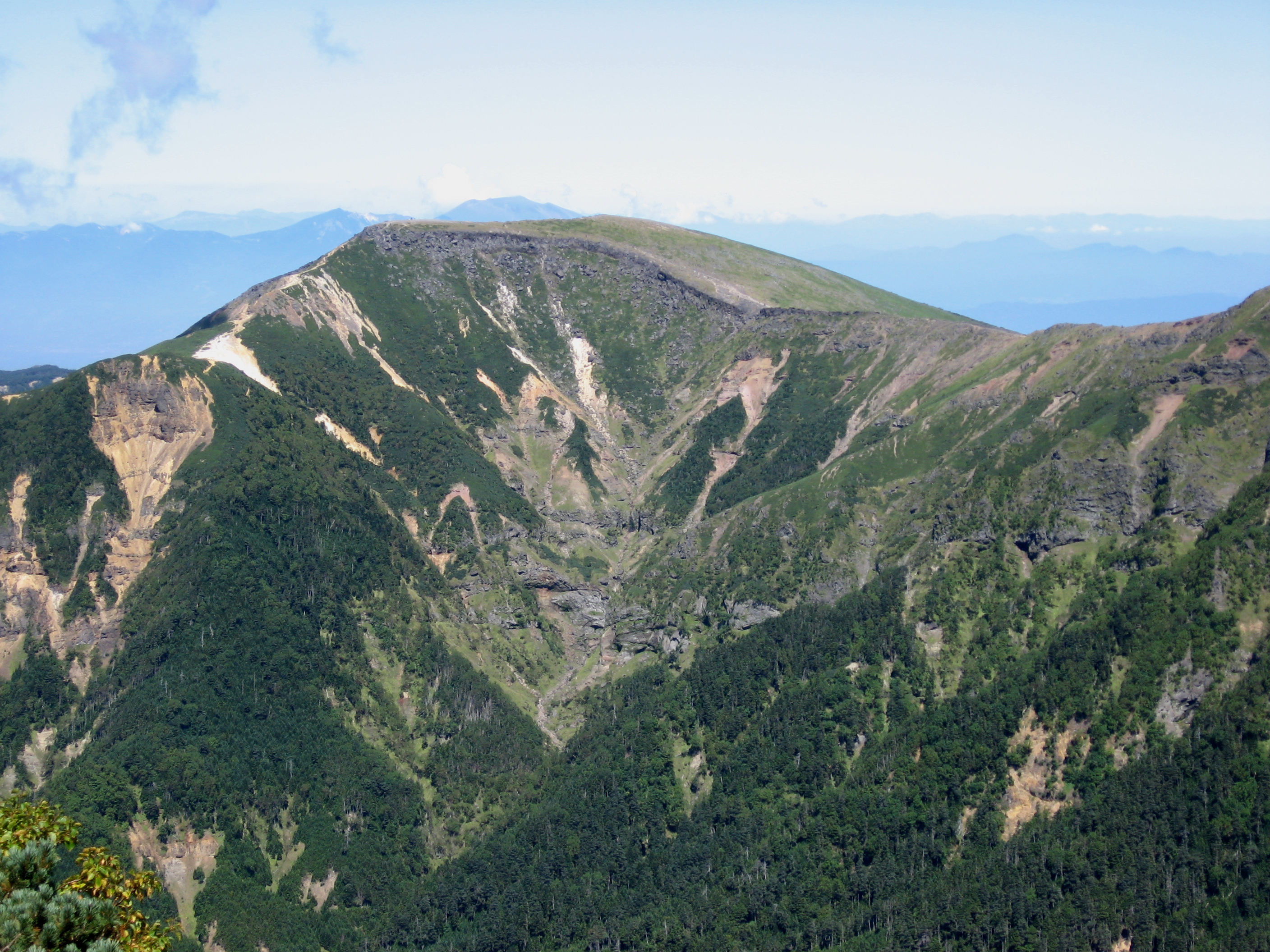
SSW side of Mount Iō

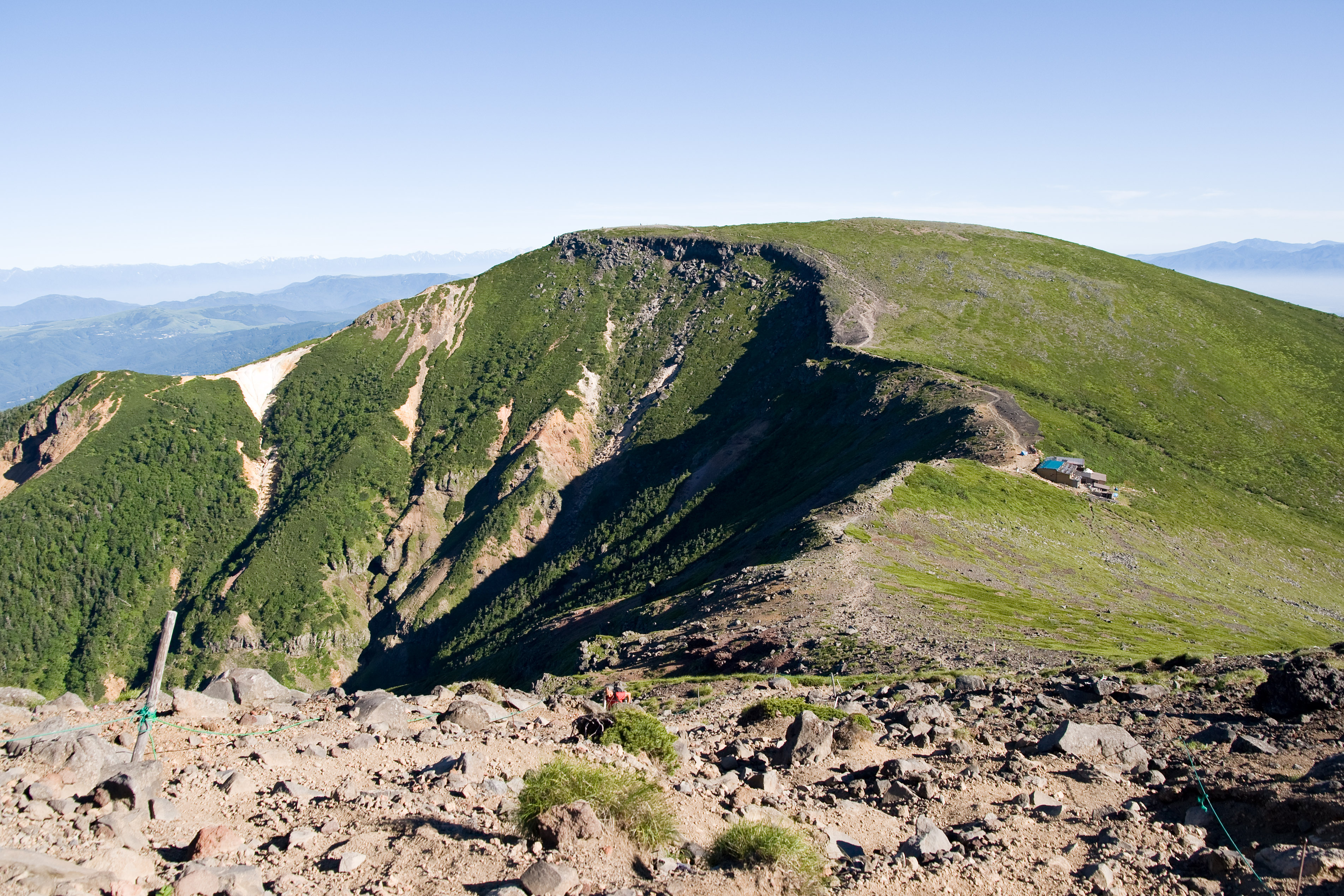
Summit of Mount Iō from the SSE

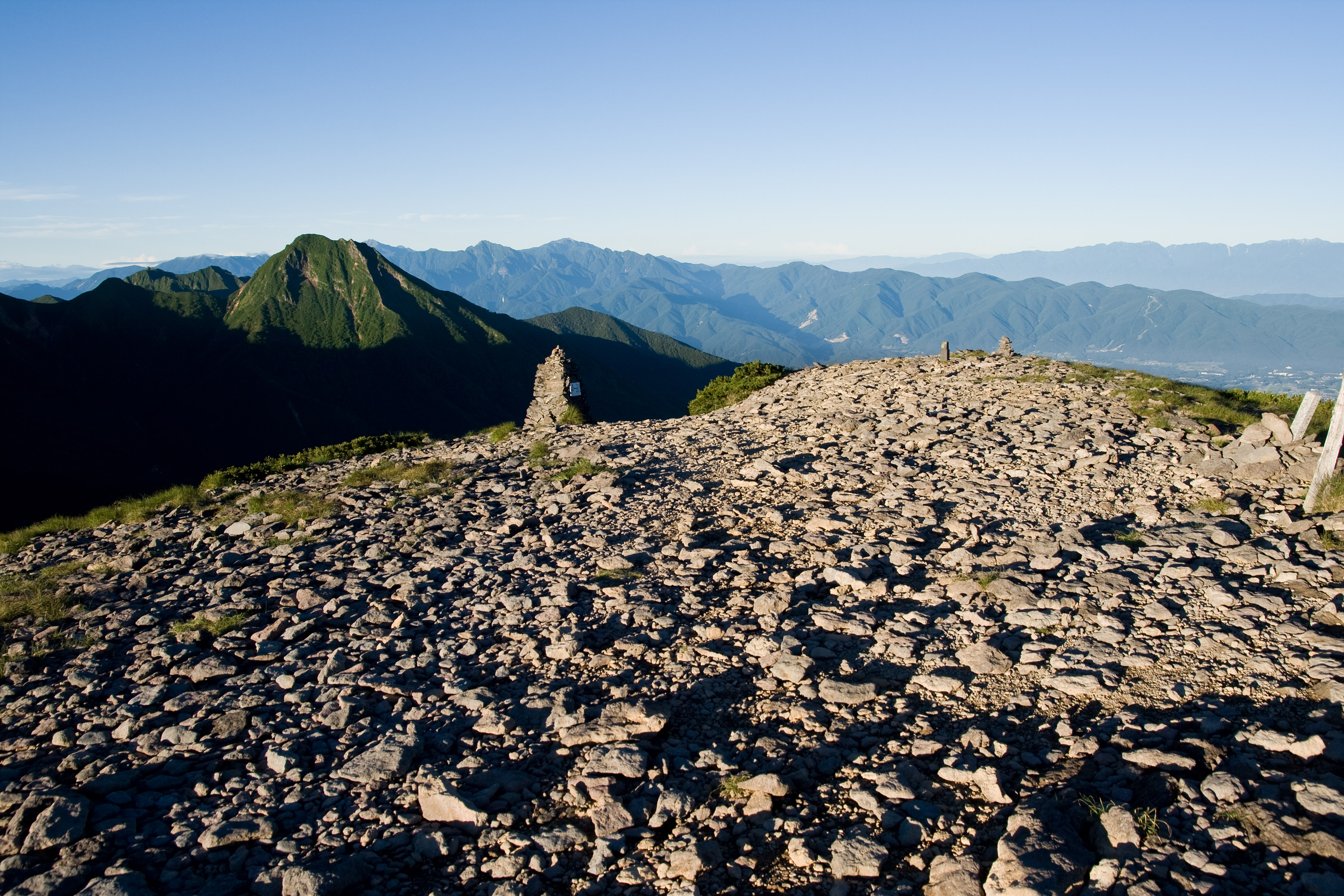
View from summit of Mount Iō. Mount Amida on the left.

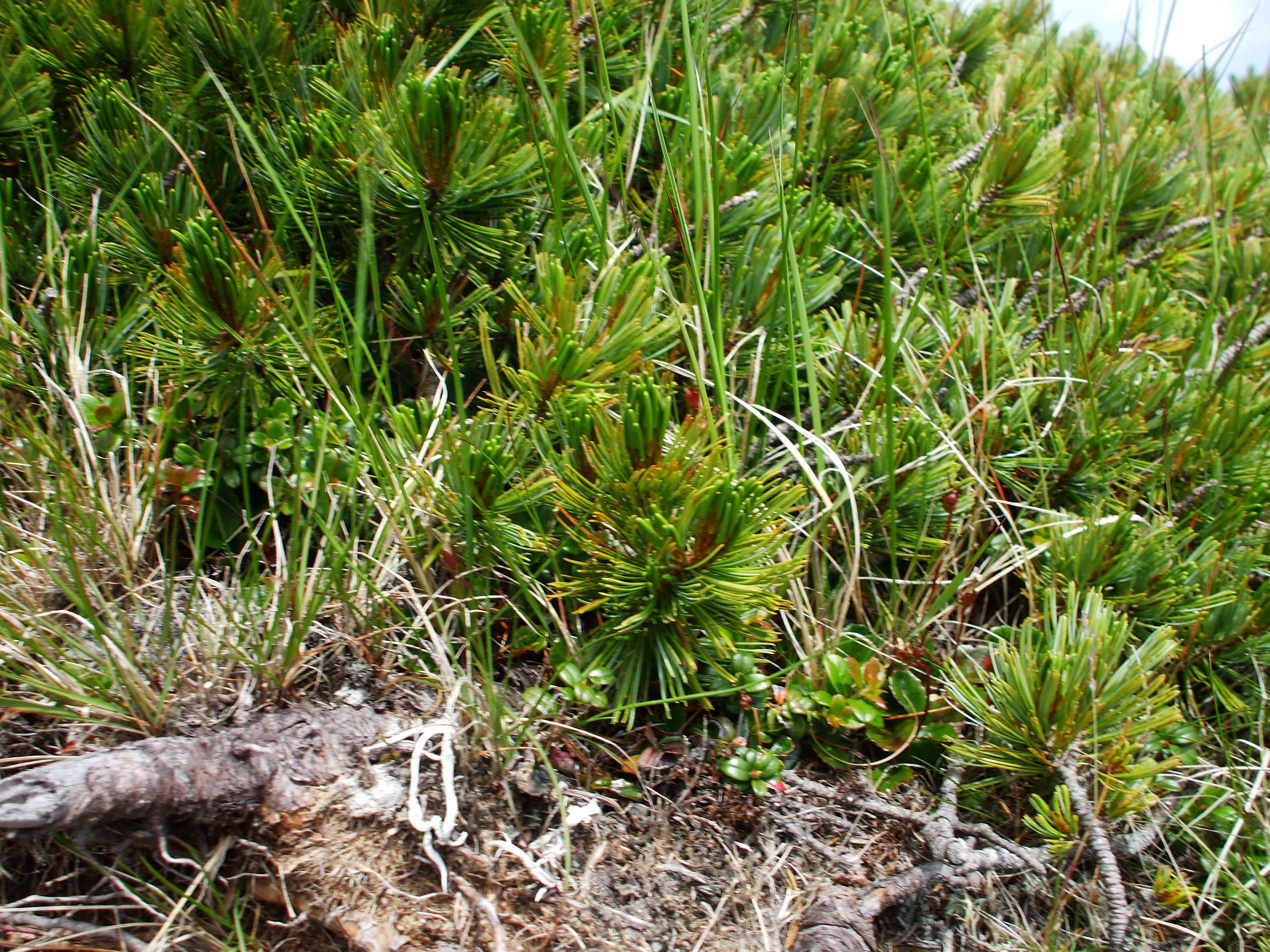
Siberian Dwarf Pines at the Top of Mount Iō
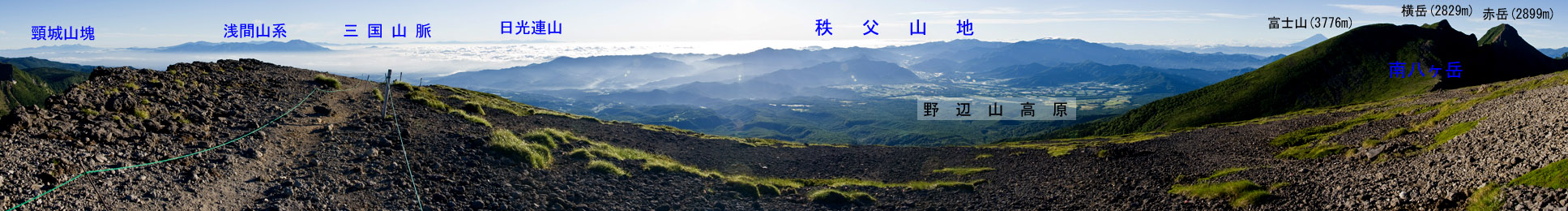
View from Summit of Mount Iō
