= Yatsugatake Mountains =

Volcanic mountain range in Japan

Coordinates: 35.9708°N 138.3700°E

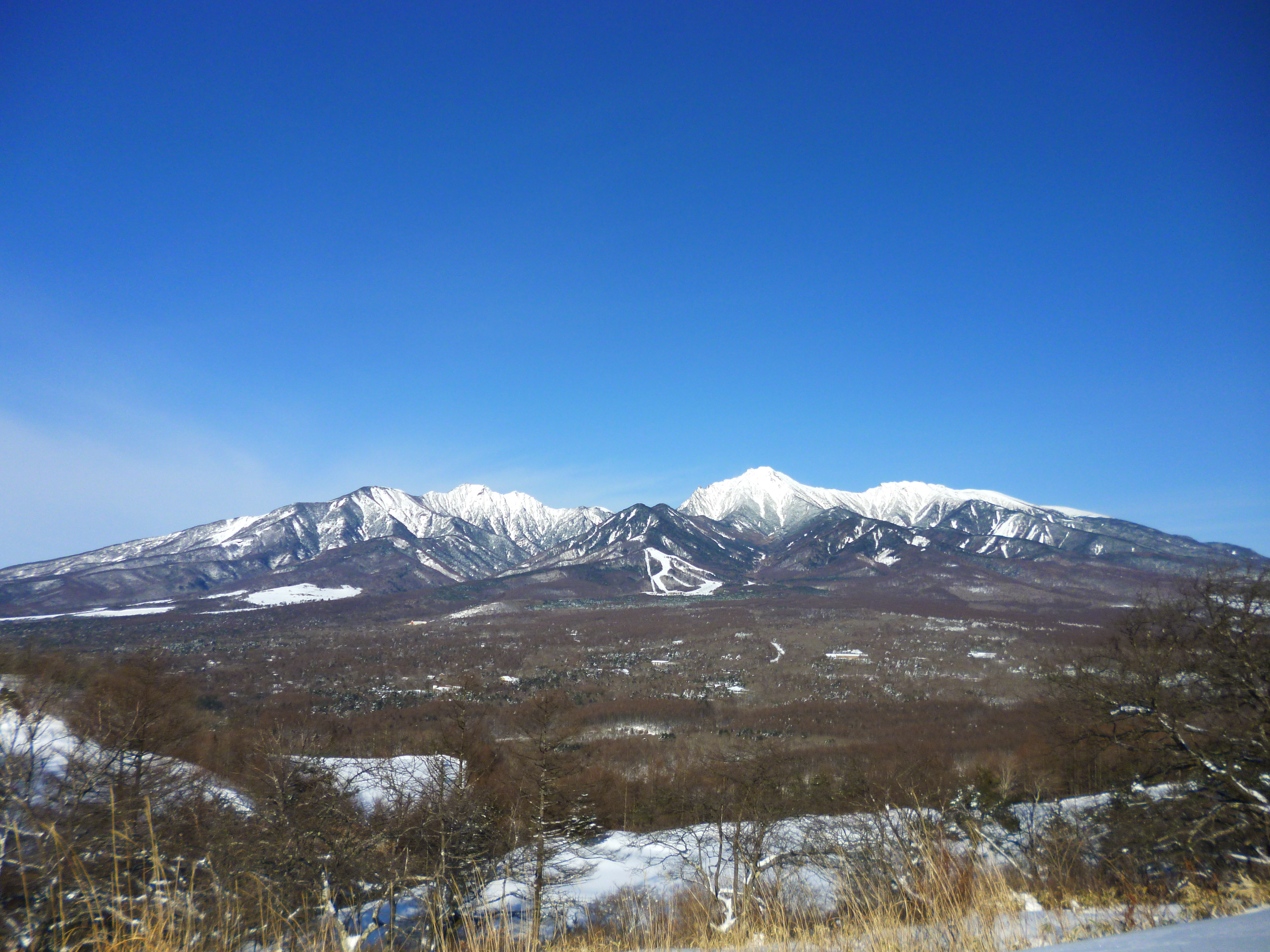
- Yatsugatake Mountains, viewed from Minamimaki, Nagano.

Highest point
- Peak: Mount Aka
- Elevation: 2,899 m (9,511 ft)

Dimensions
- Length: 30 km (19 mi) North-South

Naming
- Etymology: Mountain with eight peaks
- Native name: 八ヶ岳連峰 (Japanese)

Geography
- Country: Japan
- States: Nagano Prefecture and Yamanashi Prefecture
- Region: Chūbu
- Biome: Alpine climate

Geology
- Orogeny: Island arc
- Rock age: Quaternary
- Rock type: Volcanic

The Yatsugatake Mountains (八ヶ岳連峰, Yatsugatake-renpō) are a volcanic mountain range on the border between Nagano Prefecture and Yamanashi Prefecture on the island of Honshū in Japan.

== Description ==
The mountain range consists of two volcanic groups, Northern Yatsugatake Volcanic Group and Southern Yatsugatake Volcanic Group. The two volcanic groups of Yatsugatake, North and South, have different characteristics. The North Yatsugatake mountains are gradual and lower while the South Yatsugatake mountains are steep and are more alpine in nature.

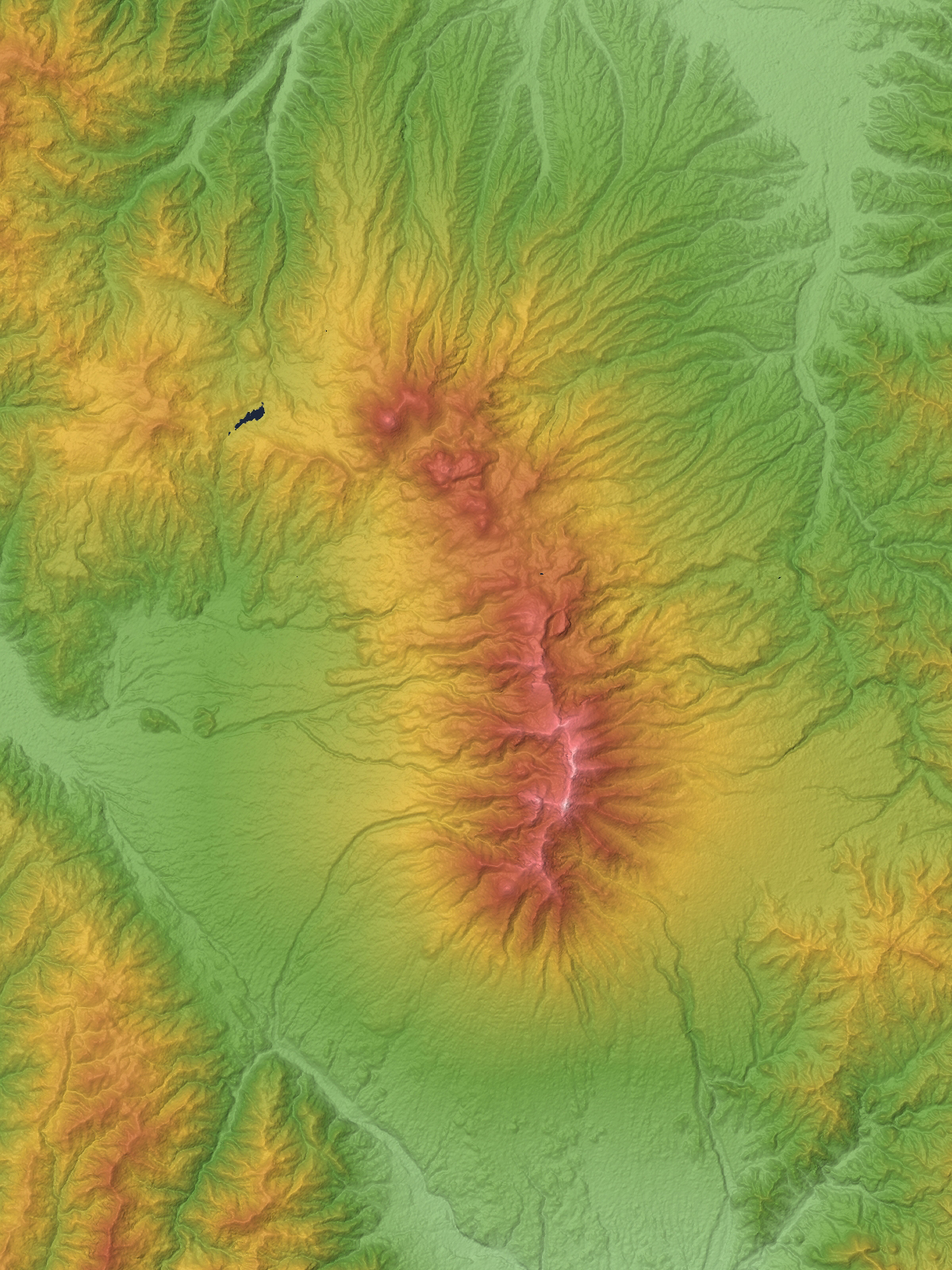
Yatsugatake Mountains

The southern group ranges from the Natsuzawa Pass to the end of the mountain range. The northern range includes Mount Yoko to the other end of the range. Mount Tateshina is also included.

These mountains form a major part of the Yatsugatake-Chūshin Kōgen Quasi-National Park.

== Geology ==
These mountains consist of older eroded complex volcanoes, which were made by repeated volcanic eruptions over many thousands years. The last eruption was estimated from 600 to 800 years ago at Mount Yoko of North Yatsugatake Mountains. This is the only remaining active volcano. The other volcanoes are extinct.

The volcanoes consist mostly of pyroxene andesite. Yatsugatake also lies nearby to the Fossa Magna (ja).

== Local legend ==
According to legend, Yatsugatake was once higher than Mount Fuji, but Konohanasakuya-hime, the goddess of Mount Fuji, tore it down out of jealousy, leaving the collection of peaks that exists today. Paul Hunt muses that this might not be far from the truth considering that Yatsugatake is older than Fuji and as Fuji rose in prominence Yatsugatake wore away.

== Ecology ==
Deciduous forests reach up 800-1700m above sea level. Above this zone is the subalpine zone reaching up to 2500m. Siberian dwarf pine inhabits this subalpine zone. On one part of Mount Nishi under 1700m grows a rare form of spruce, Picea koyamae. Rock Ptarmigan (Lagopus muta) are also native to these mountains, but are under threat due to loss of the Siberian dwarf pine habitat and also due to expansion of the range of the red fox. Humans have enabled the expansion of the red fox by leaving trash behind in the mountains. Also growing in the subalpine zone are Abies veitchii and Abies mariesii.

== Gallery ==
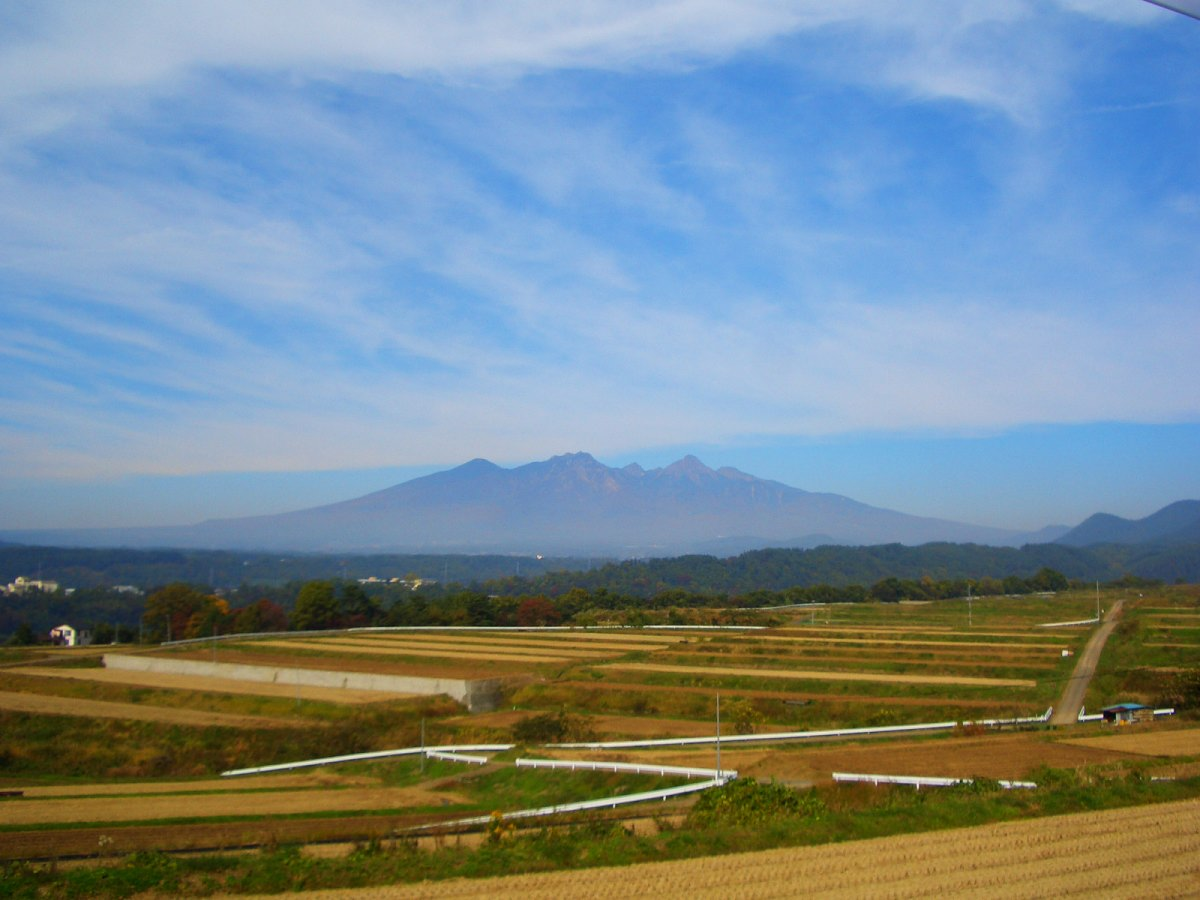
Southern Yatsugatake Volcanic Group from the SSE

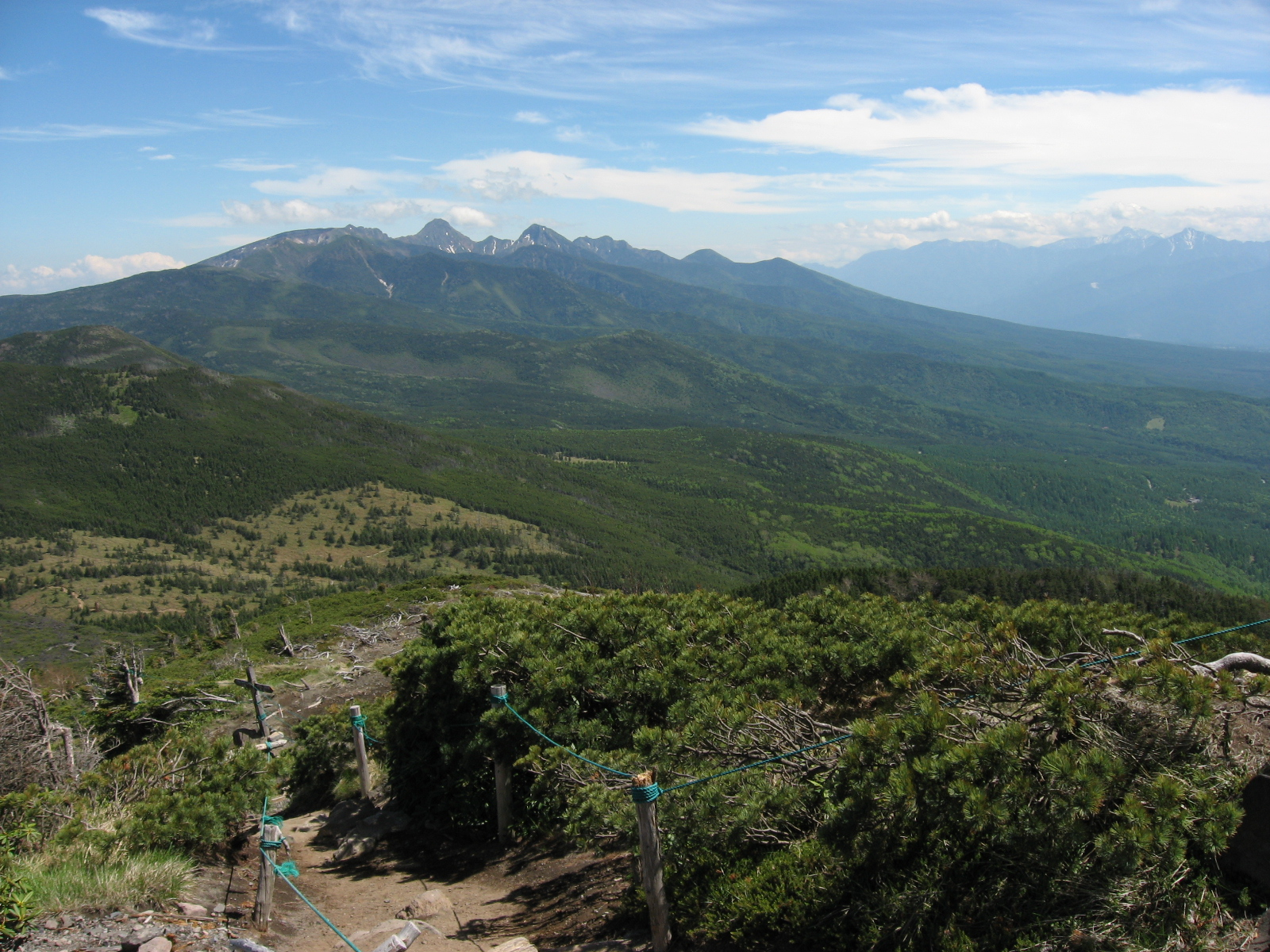
Southern Yatsugatake from the NNW

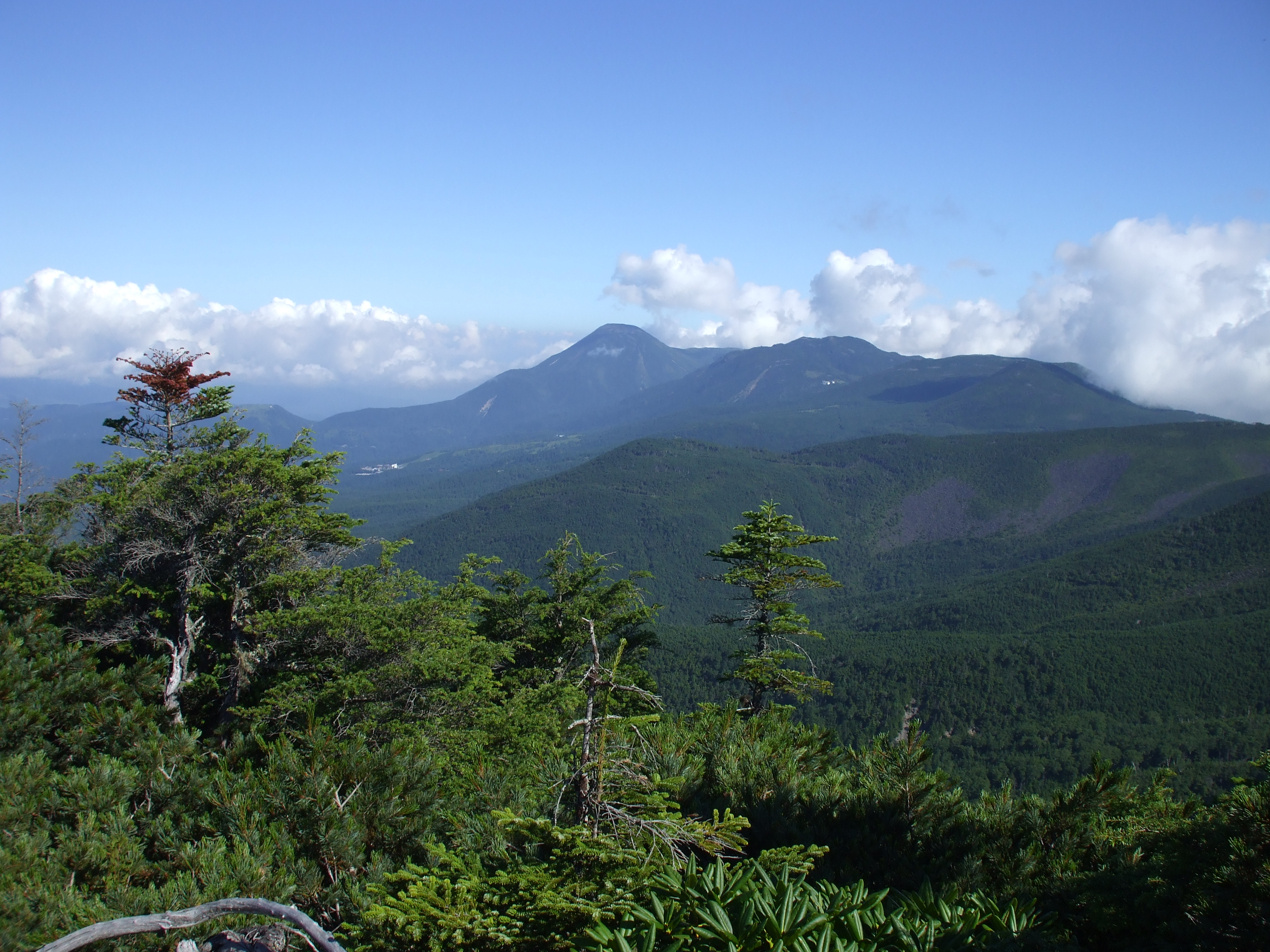
Northern Yatsugatake Volcanic Group from the S

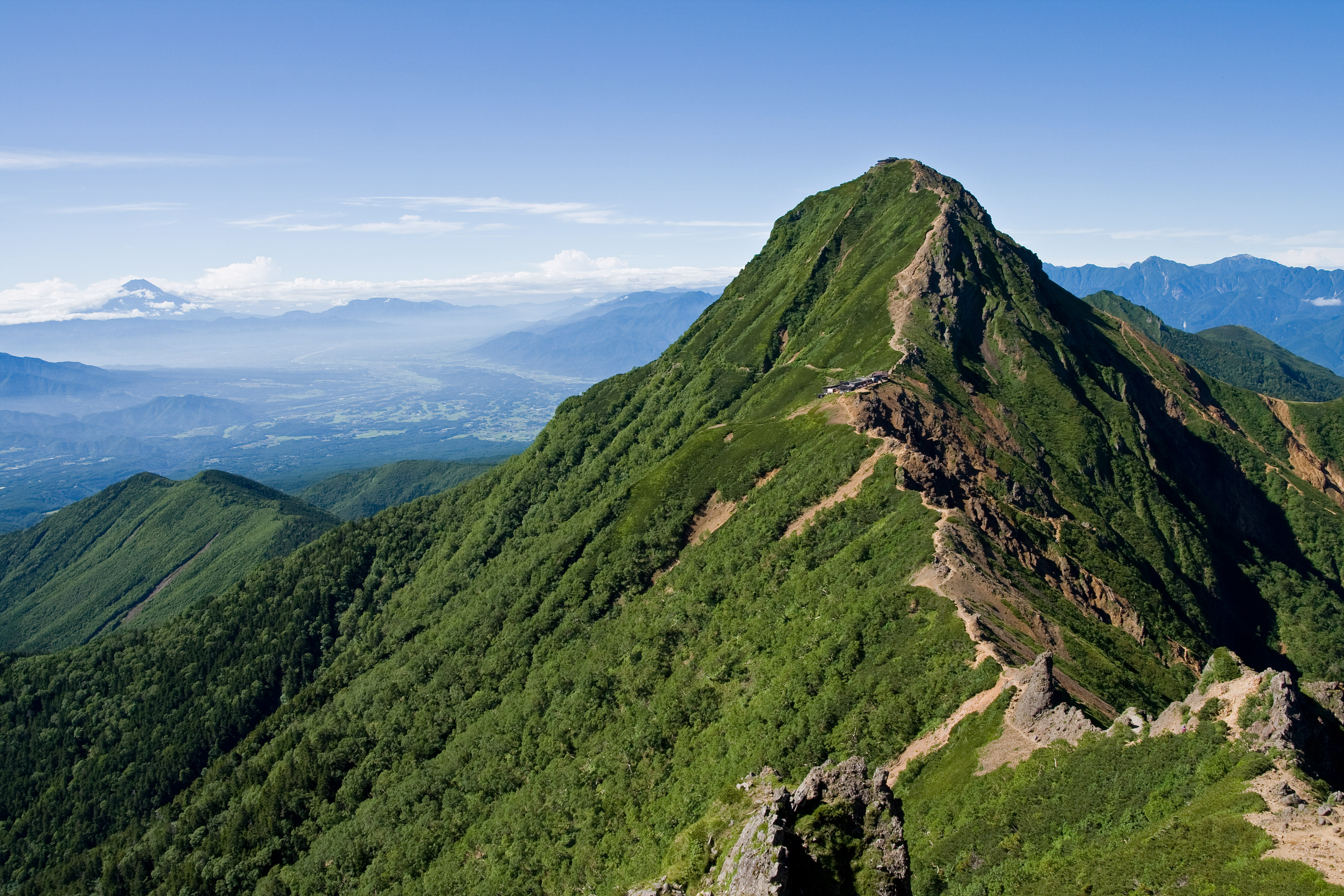
Mount Aka

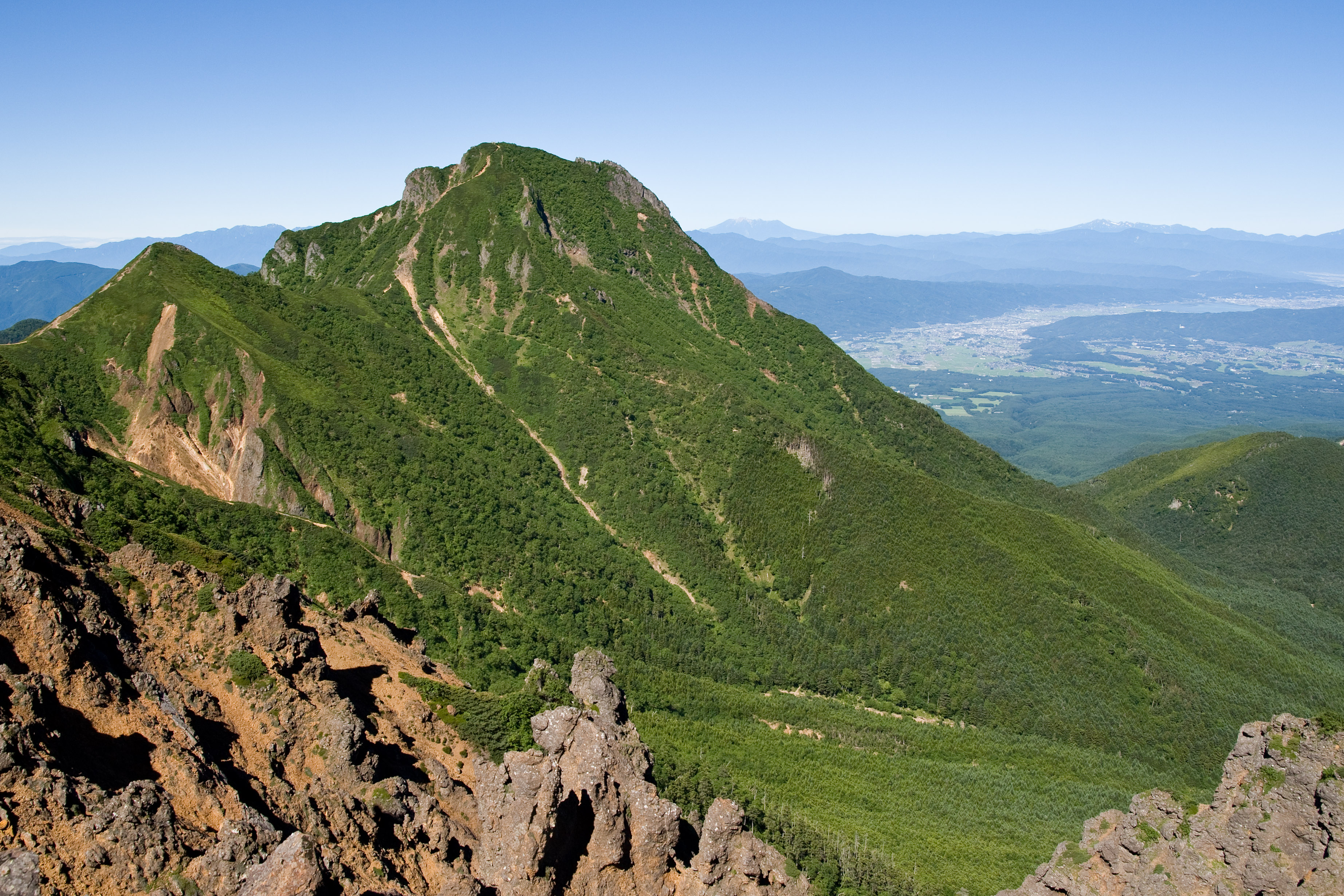
Mount Amida

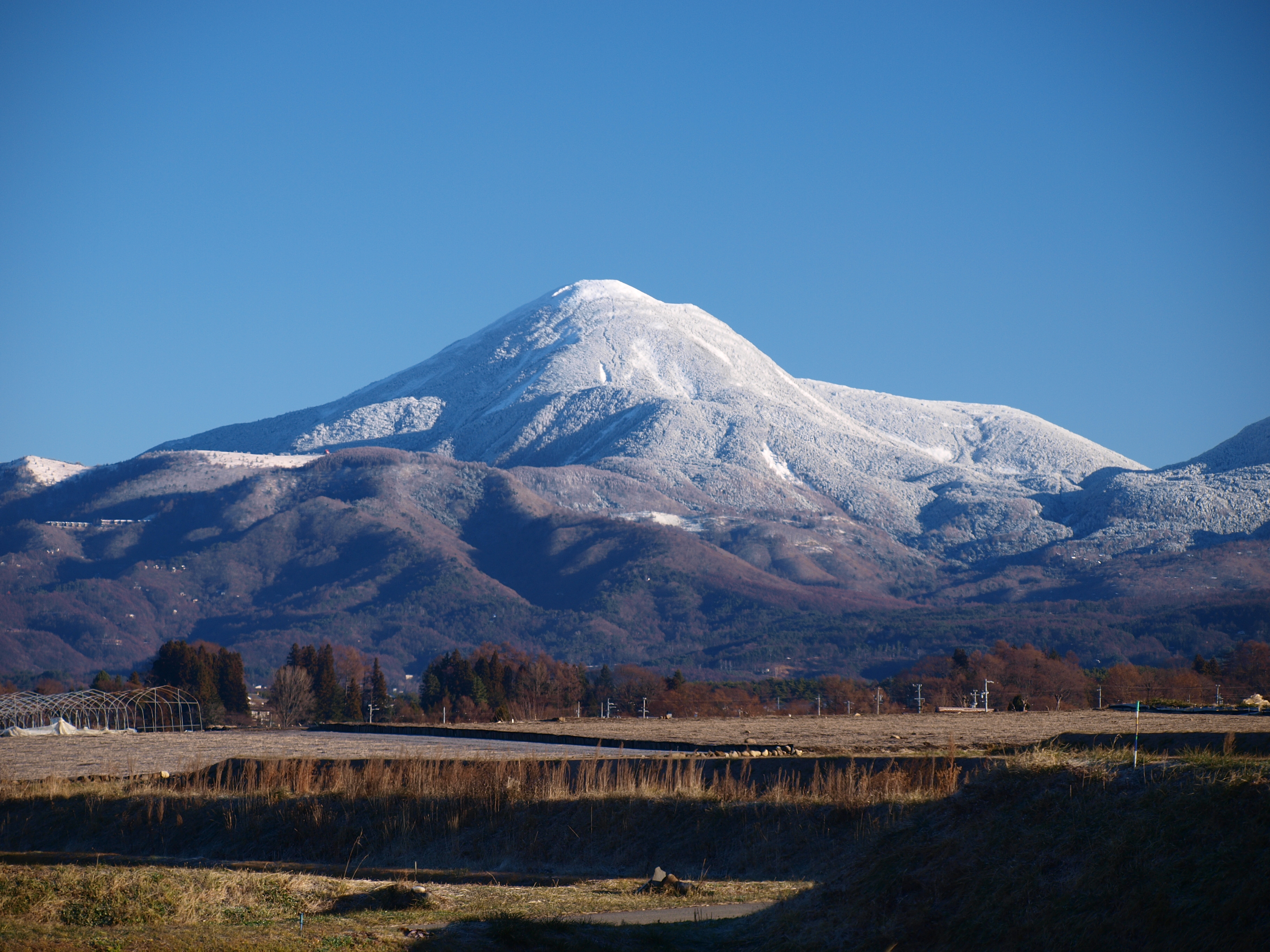
Mount Tateshina

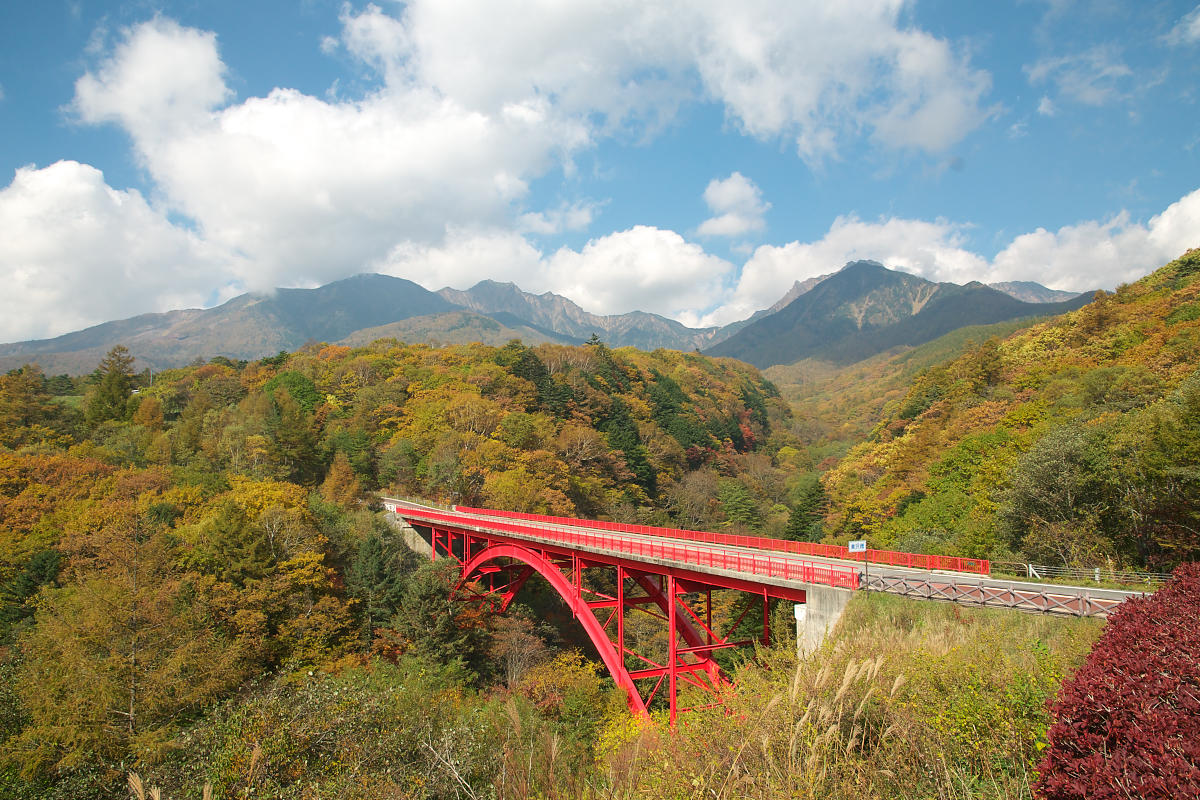
Mt. Yatsugatake and Higashizawa Bridge Hokuto, Yamanashi
