= Omuro =

Omuro or Ōmuro may refer to:

== Places ==
- Mount Ōmuro (Mount Fuji), mountain at the foot of Mount Fuji, Japan
- Mount Ōmuro (Shizuoka), mountain in Izu-Tobu, Japan
- Mount Ōmuro (Tanzawa), mountain in the Tanzawa Mountains, Japan
- Omuro-Ninnaji Station, tram stop in Kyoto, Japan

== People ==
- Hideki Omuro (born 1990), Japanese athlete

== Archaeology ==
- Ōmuro Kofun group, burial mounds in Japan

== Entertainment ==
- Ōmuro-ke, spin-off web manga of YuruYuri
- Takahiro Omuro, character in Kamen Rider Agito
