= Senryū-Shōgunzuka Kofun =

Pair of Kofun period tumuli in Japan

Coordinates: 36°34′11″N 138°06′34″E

Senryū-Shōgunzuka Kofun - Himezuka Kofun
- 川柳将軍塚古墳・姫塚古墳 (Japanese)
- Location in Japan Senryū-Shōgunzuka Kofun (Japan)
- Type: kofun
- Periods: Kofun period
- Location: Nagano, Nagano, Japan
- Region: Chubu region

Site notes
- Condition: ruins
- Public access: Yes (no public facilities)

Yes

The Senryū-Shōgunzuka Kofun - Himezuka Kofun (川柳将軍塚古墳・姫塚古墳) is a pair of Kofun period tumuli, located in the Shinonoi-ishikawa neighborhood of the city of Nagano in the Chubu region Japan. They have has been protected under a single National Historic Site designation since 1977.

== Overview ==
The Senryū-Shōgunzuka Kofun is a zenpō-kōen-fun (前方後円墳), which is shaped like a keyhole, having one square end and one circular end, when viewed from above. It is located on the western slope of Mount Shimomoi at the western edge of the Nagano Basin, with the ruins of a small settlement and rice fields at its base. The size of the mound is 93 meters in length, with a 45-meter diameter posterior circular portion, ten meters in height and a 26 meter long anterior rectangular portion, five meters in height, and is orientated north-northeast. It was once covered with fukiishi and cylindrical haniwa and had an encircling moat, small traces of which still exist. The tumulus had two vertical burial chambers arranged parallel to the main axis, one on each portion of the mound. Both chambers were lined with split andesite stone blocks, and were painted in vermillion. The chamber in the posterior domed-portion was 10.3 meters in length by 1.8 meters wide. The anterior chamber was 2.7 meters long by 1.2 meters wide.

The tomb was robbed by local farmers in 1800, who found that it contained a large number of grave goods, including 42 bronze mirrors, wheel-like stones, copper tubes, jewelry and beads, magatama, and fragments of armor. The site was re-excavated in 1927. The number of bronze mirrors from this tumulus was extraordinarily large, but the whereabouts of only six are known today. Of these six, one had been determined to have been of Western Han provenience, and the others were made in Japan.

The style of the haniwa recovered at the site is very similar to that of the Mori-Shōgunzuka Kofun, leading archaeologists to concur that this tomb was built from the end of the 4th century to the first half of the 5th century. As with the Mori-Shōgunzuka Kofun, it is regarded as a tomb of the local king with close relations to the imperial dynasty.

The Himezuka Kofun is a "two conjoined rectangles" typed zenpō-kōhō-fun (前方後方墳), and is located 200 meter north of the Senryū-Shōgunzuka Kofun on the same ridge. Its total length is 31 meters. The rear portion is 20 meters high with a height of four meters and the front portion has height of two meters. It has not been excavated, but from its style is thought to date to around the middle of the 4th century, and to thus pre-date the Senryū-Shōgunzuka Kofun.

The site is approximately ten minutes by car from Shinonoi Station on the JR West Shin'etsu Main Line; however, there are no public facilities and the tombs are located in an area with dense forests.

== See also ==
- List of Historic Sites of Japan (Nagano)
