= Tobayama Cave =

Archaeological site

- 鳥羽山洞窟 (Japanese)
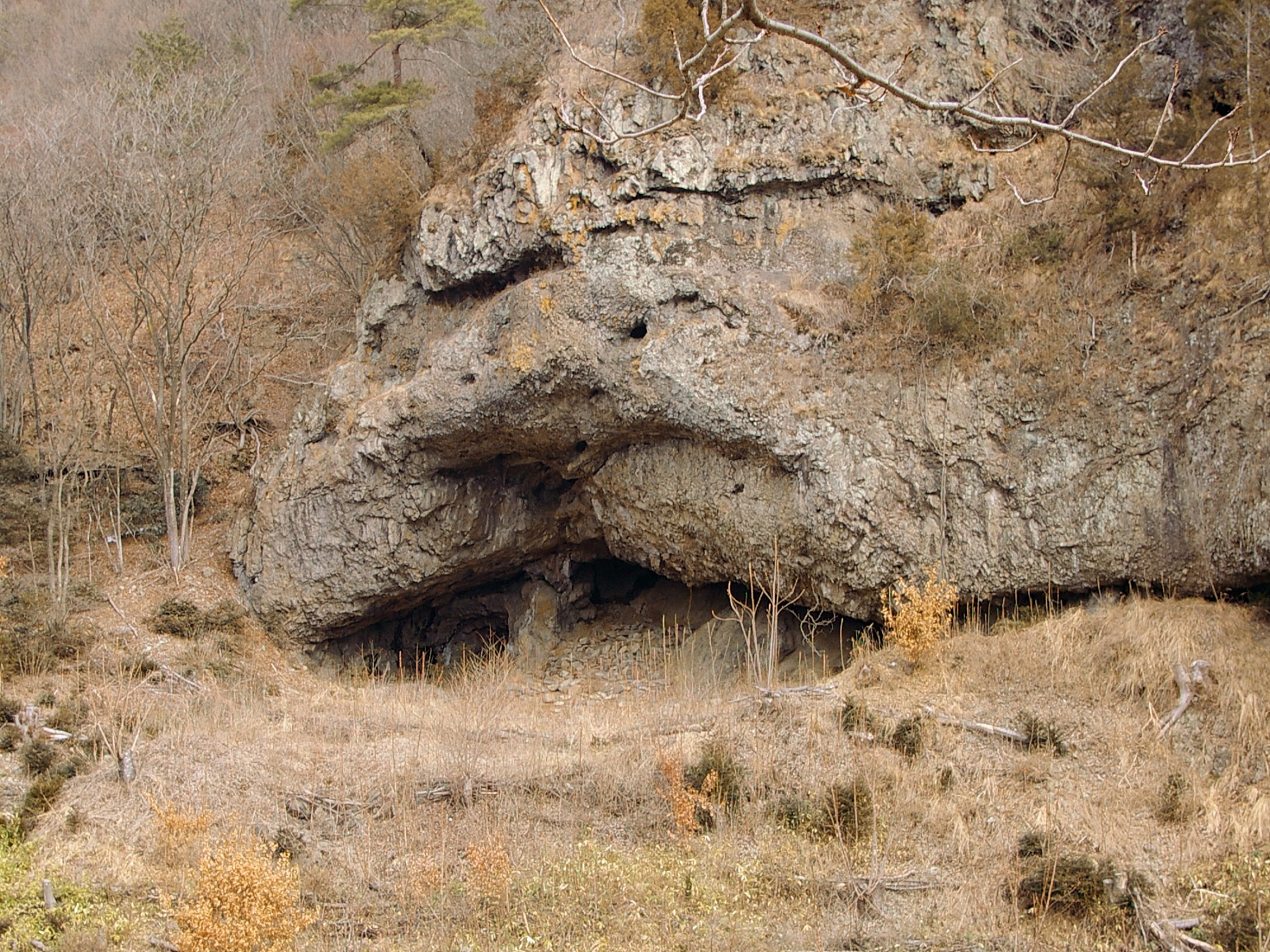
- Tobayama Cave

- Tobayama Cave Tobayama Cave (Japan)
- 36°17′54″N 138°15′29″E
- Type: grave
- Periods: Kofun period
- Location: Ueda, Nagano, Japan
- Region: Chūbu region

Site notes
- Public access: None

The Tobayama Cave (鳥羽山洞窟, Tobayama dōkutsu) is an archaeological site consisting of a cave dwelling and cave tomb in use from the late Jōmon, through the Yayoi and early Kofun periods, located in the Koshigoe neighborhood of the city of Ueda, Nagano in the Chūbu region of Japan. The site was designated a National Historic Site of Japan in 1978.

== Overview ==
Tobayama Cave is located in the foothills of Mount Toba, approximately 15 meters from the Chikuma River, near its confluence with the Yoda River. The cave is a natural formation with an entrance height of 25 meters and a depth of only 15 meters. Archaeological excavations were initially centered on the Kofun period (approximately 5th century AD) relics which were found within the cave, which included a paved floor of cobblestones from the Yoda River. The cave was used as a tomb, presumably by local clans who did not build kofun tumuli. Human remains were found in three strata from this period, including one strata where multiple remains consisted all of crushed bones. Similar graves have been found in Southeast Asia and in Okinawa, but are very rare on Honshu in mainland Japan. Grave goods included numerous iron weapons, horse fittings, whetstones, copper bracelets and Sue ware pottery. Beneath this strata were relics from the Jōmon and Yayoi periods, indicating that this cave had been inhabited for several centuries prior to its use as a tomb as a cave dwelling.

The excavated relics are on permanent display at the Ueda City Maruko Cultural Museum (上田市立丸子郷土博物館, Ueda shiritsu Maruko Gyōdo Hakubutsukan). The cave is located a 20-minute walk from the "Shimooki" bus stop on the Chikuma Buss from Ueda Station however, there is no public access.

== See also ==
- List of Historic Sites of Japan (Nagano)
