= Former Nakagomi School =

- 旧中込学校
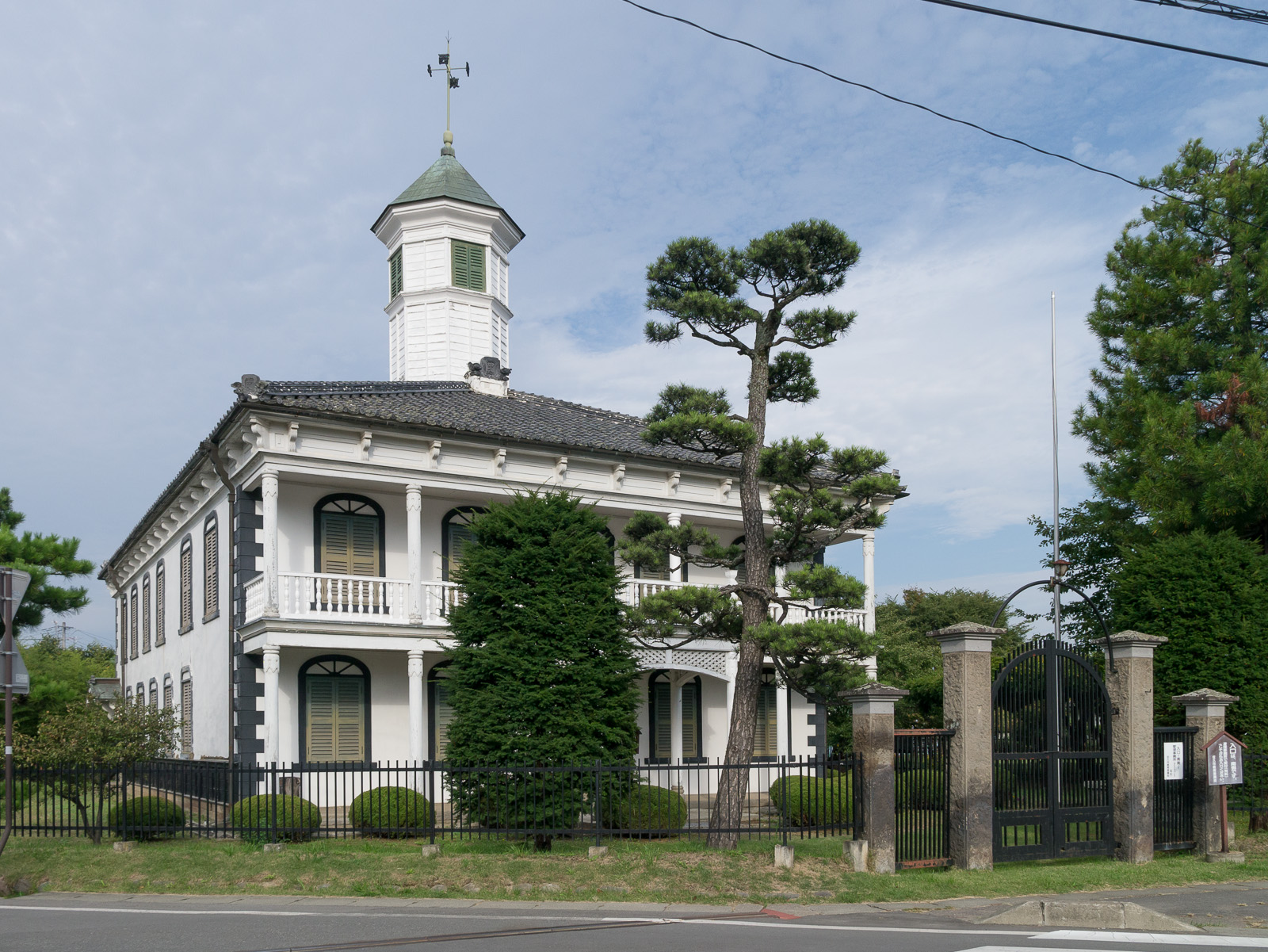
- Former Nakagomi School

- Location within Nagano Prefecture Location within Japan

General information
- Type: Schoolhouse
- Architectural style: Giyōfū architecture
- Location: Saku, Nagano, Japan, Japan
- Coordinates: 36°14′14″N 138°28′20″E
- Opened: 1875

Technical details
- Floor count: 2
- Floor area: 259.4 square meters
- National Historic Site of Japan National Important Cultural Property

The Former Nakagomi School (旧中込学校, kyū-Nakagomi gakkō) is a surviving Giyōfū-style building from the Meiji period located in the Nakagomi neighborhood of the city of Saku, Nagano、Japan. The building was designated a National Important Cultural Property of Japan in March 1969 and a National Historic Site of Japan in April 1969.

== Overview ==
The Nakagome School was built by public donation by the inhabitants of the village of Shimomura in 1875. It is currently the oldest western-style school building in Japan. The architect was a local village carpenter, Ichikawa Shirojiro, who had studied in Sacramento, California in the United States from 1869 to 1873.

The building is in a pseudo-Western style incorporating both western and Japanese elements. The two-story structure has a Japanese-style tile roof and the internal construction makes use of Japanese traditional carpentry techniques; however, the design is symmetric with western elements such as front porch and veranda and an octagonal tower reminiscent of a lighthouse. All the windows are fitted with shutters. The design also makes extensive use of glass, which was unusual for the time due to its expense, and there are also some stained glass decorative elements. The building also contains a drum for sounding the time, which was a traditional Japanese method.

The outer walls are of white plaster with no exposed beams or pillars, with the arches around the windows and the corners of the building in black stucco mimicking stone. The round floor contains small gender-segregated wardrobes to the left and right of the entrance and a large single classroom. The upper story contains six rooms including the principal's office, teacher's room, classrooms, etc. arranged on the right and left of a central corridor. The total area of the building is 259.4 square meters.

The building continued to be used as a school until 1919, when it was converted to a town hall, and later to a public hall. It was extensively repaired in 1971, and underwent a restoration in 1995 to bring it back to its original design. It is open to the public as a museum. The grounds also contains an old JNR Class C56 locomotive on display. It is located about a 5-minute walk from Namezu Station on the JR East Koumi Line.

== Gallery ==
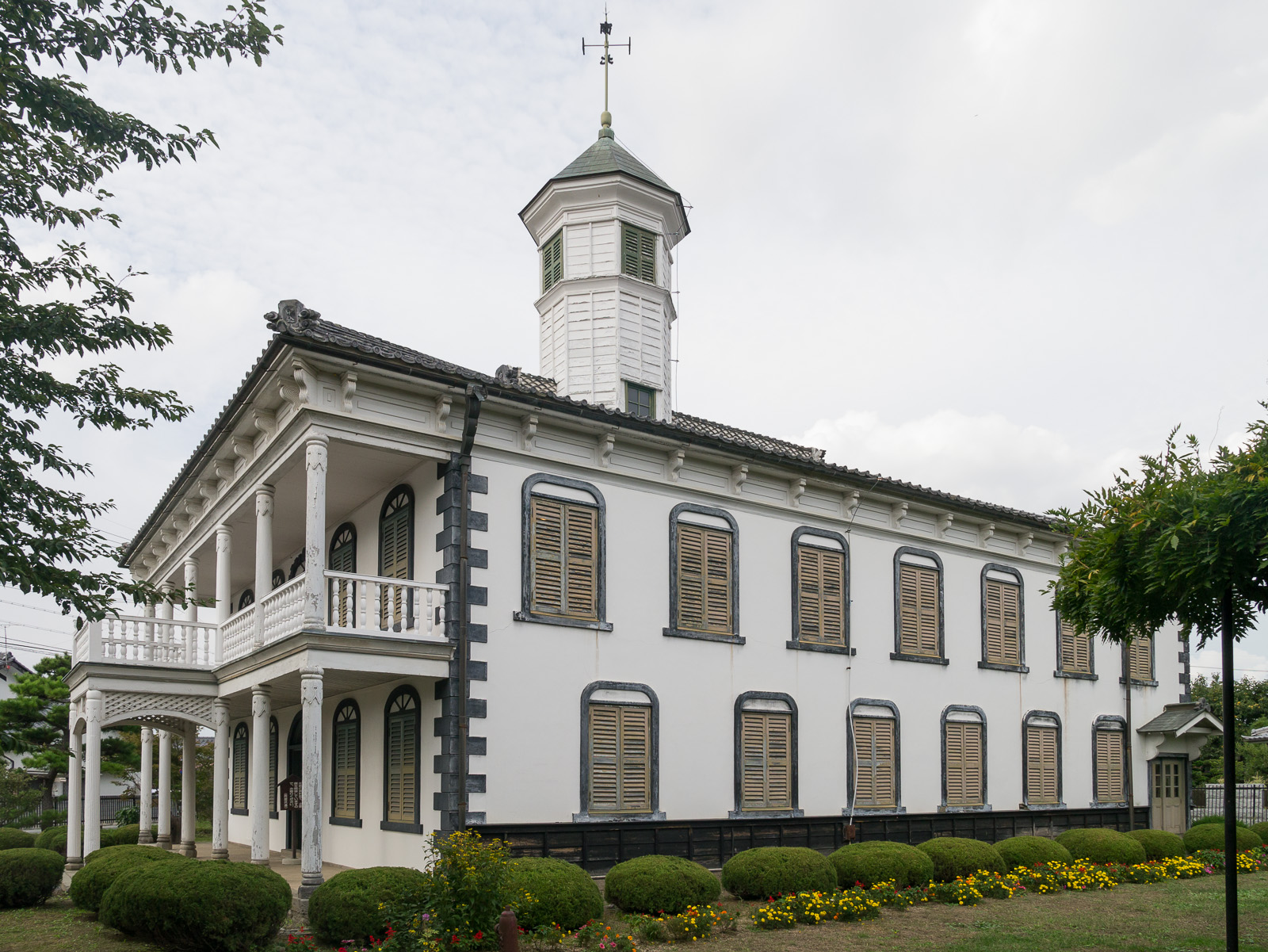
Side view

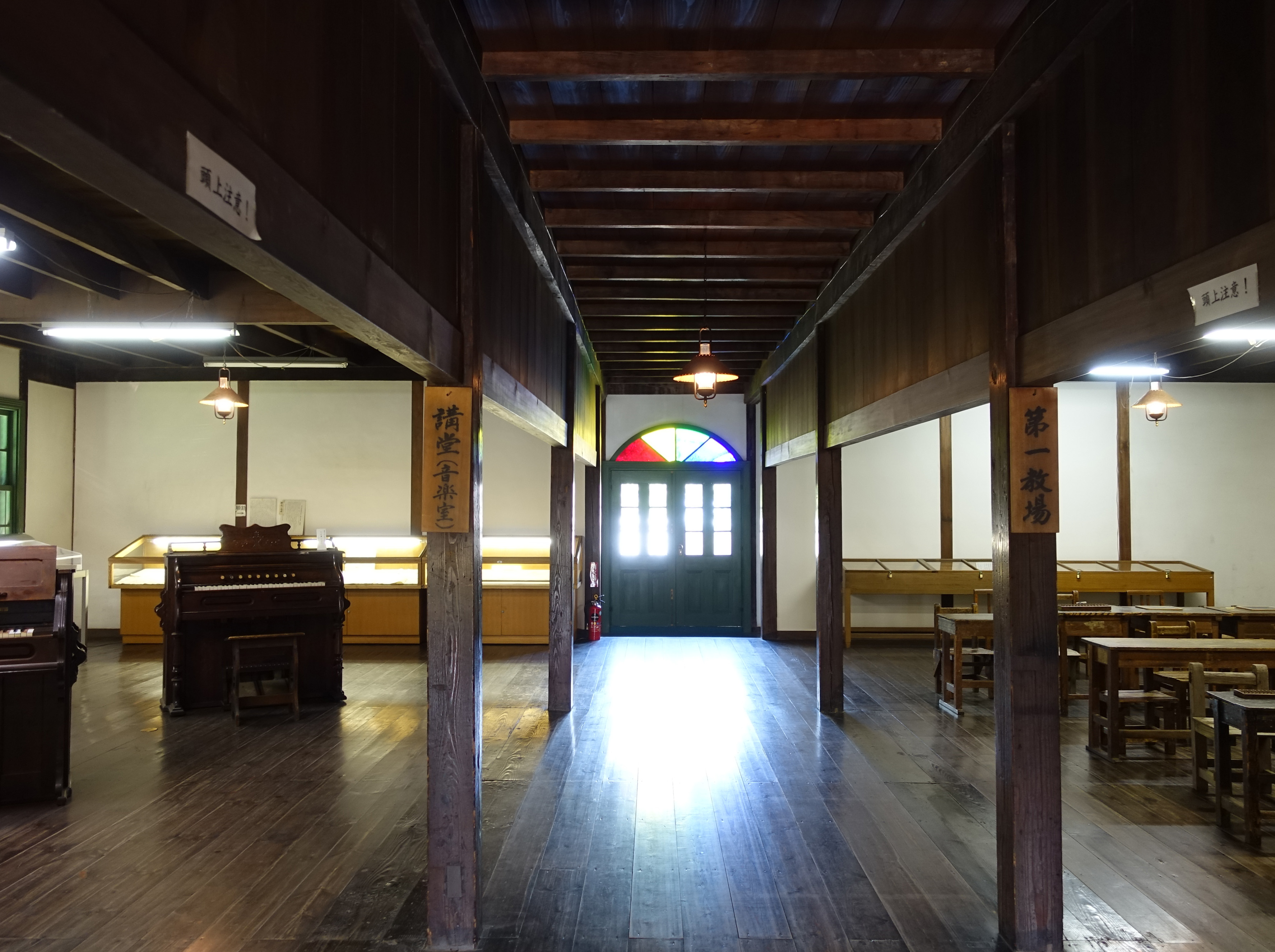
Interior

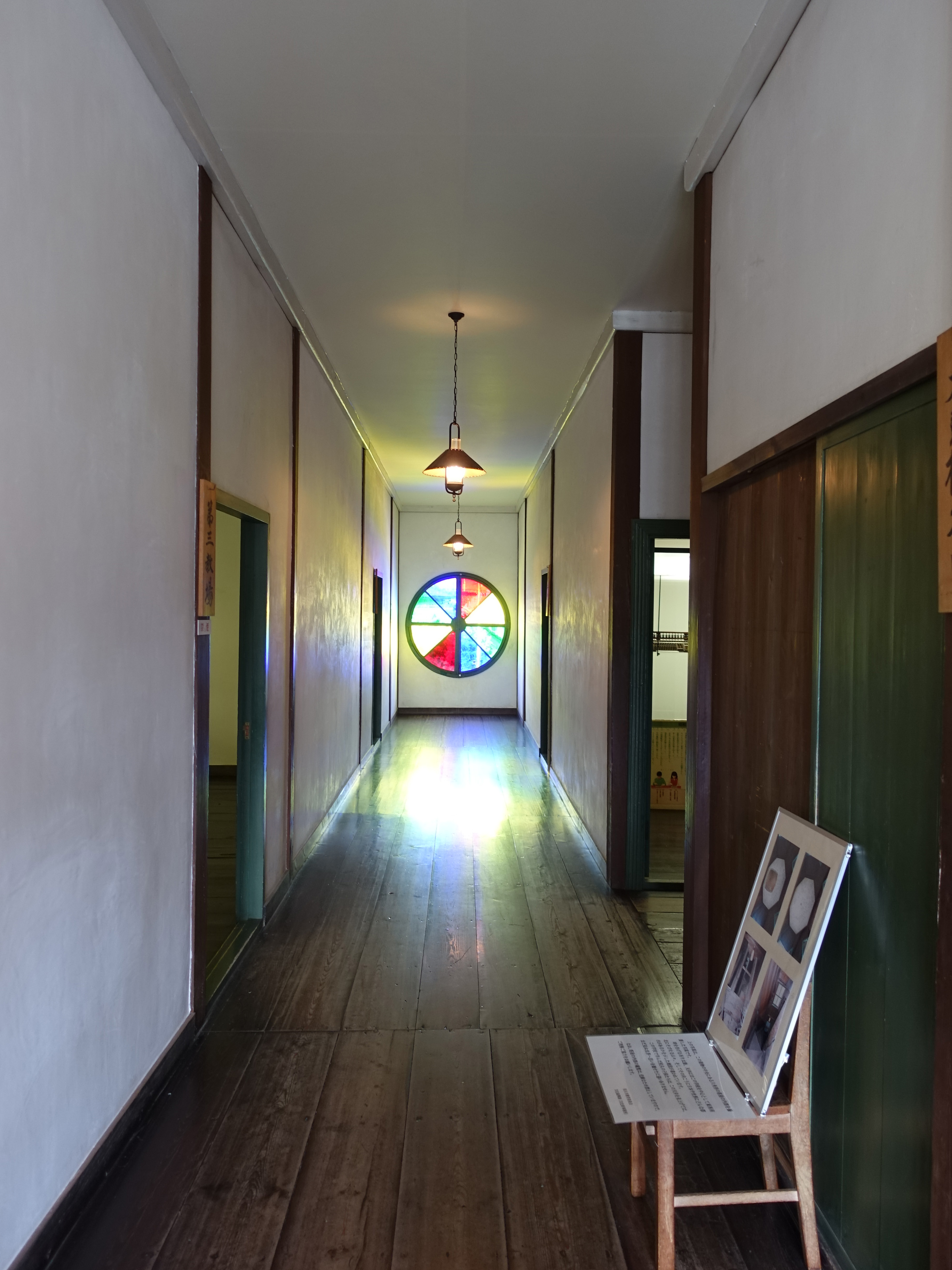
Hallway

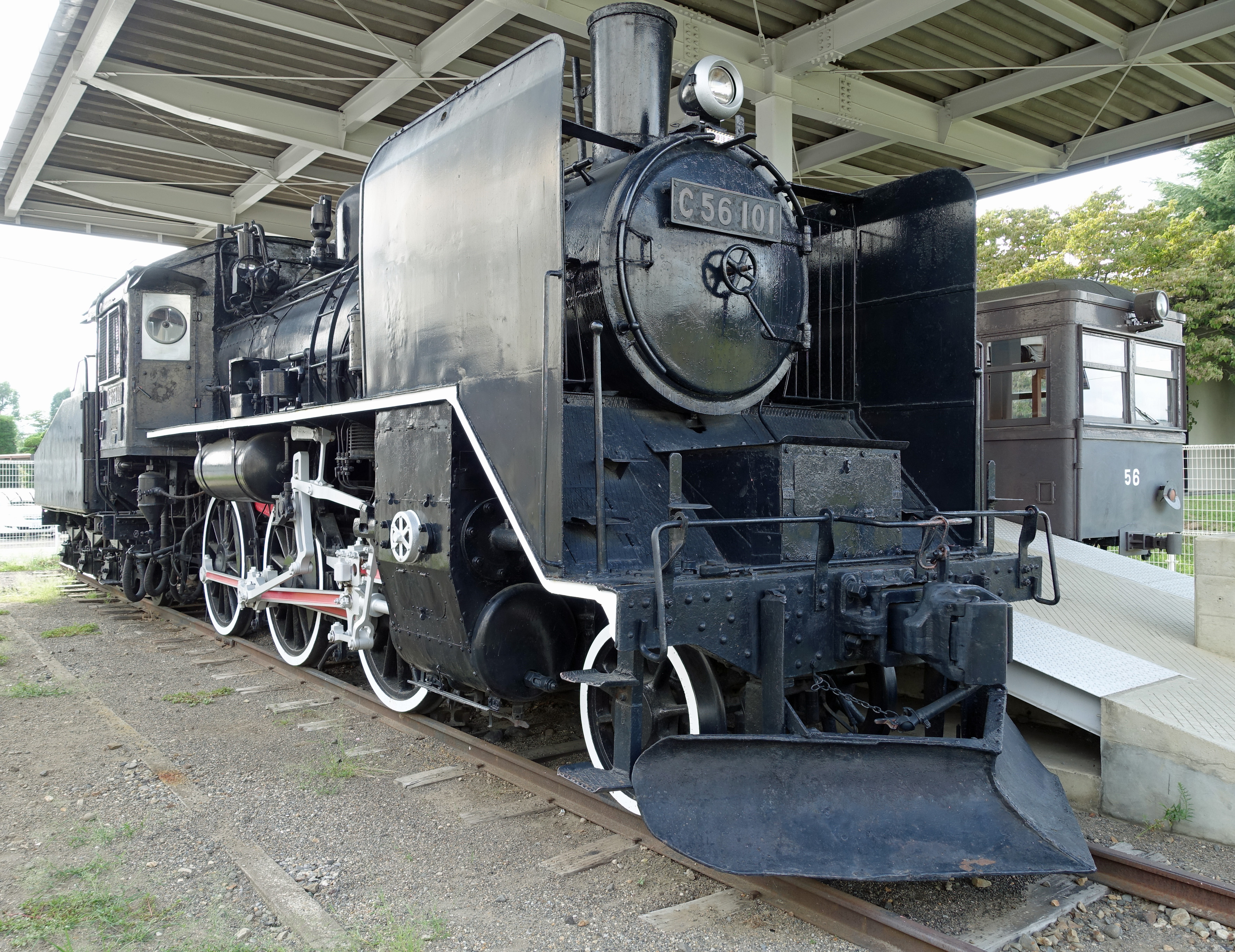
JNR C56 101 locomotive

== See also ==
- List of Historic Sites of Japan (Nagano)
