= Sanada-shi Yakata =

Castle in Nagano, Japan

- 真田氏館
- Ueda, Nagano Prefecture, Japan
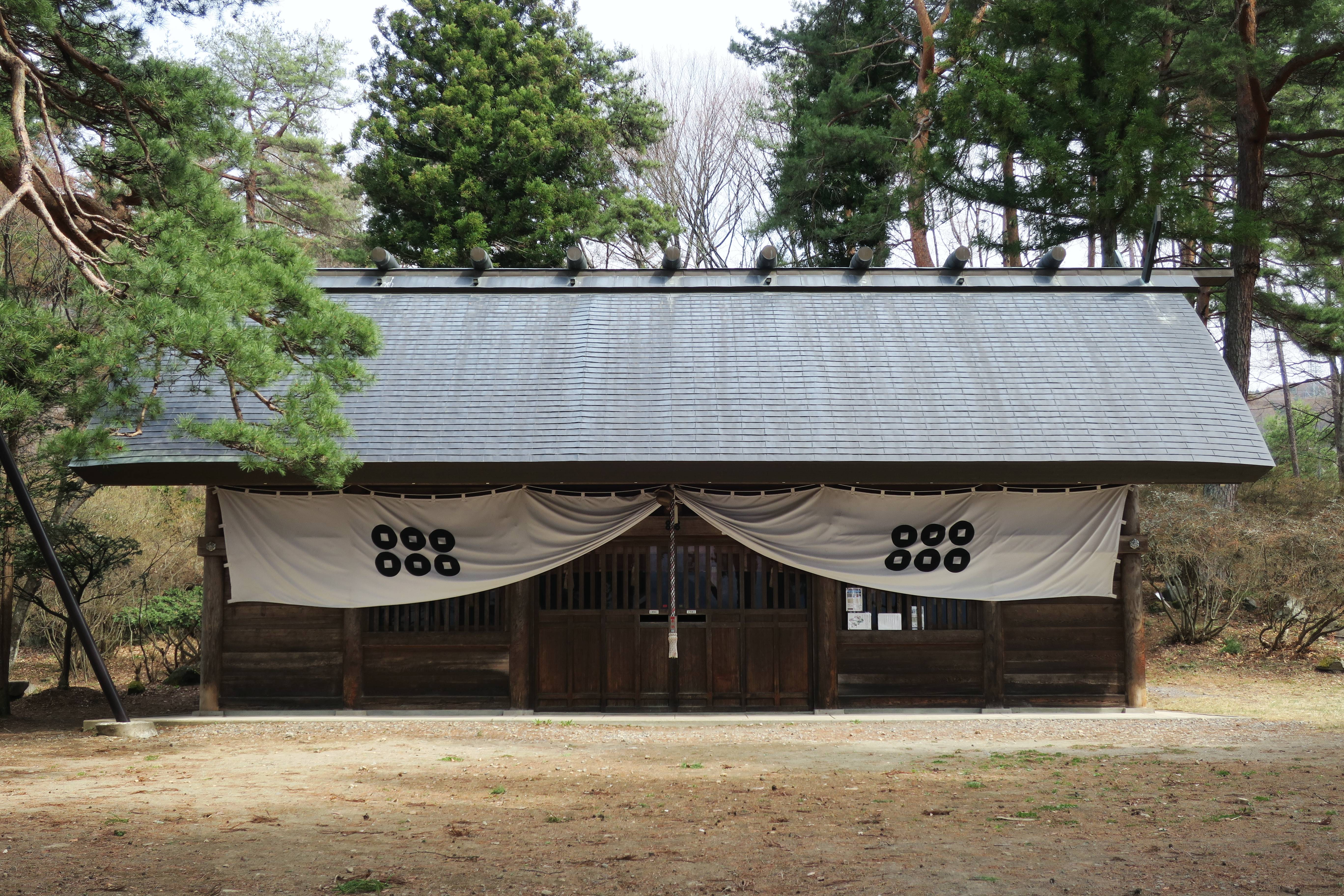
- Sanada-shi Yakata (Kōtai Shrine)

Site information
- Type: Hirajiro-style castle
- Owner: Sanada clan
- Condition: ruins

Site history
- Built: 1551
- Built by: Sanada Yukitaka
- Demolished: 1585

Garrison information
- Past commanders: Sanada Yukitaka; Sanada Nobutsuna; Sanada Masayuki

Sanada-shi Yakata (真田氏館, Sanada-shi Yakata) is the remains of a fortified residence of the Sanada clan in Ueda, Nagano Prefecture, Japan. The site is believed that it was a main bastion of the Sanada clan until Sanada Masayuki moved their base to Ueda Castle in 1585.

Sanada-shi Yakata was considered unsuitable for withstanding a siege and Sanada clan had such castles as Sanada-shi Honjō Castle and Tenpaku Castle near the residence.

Its ruins have been protected as a Prefectural Historic Sites. The residence is now only ruins, with some stone walls, moats, and earthworks. Kōtai Shrine which was built by Sanada Masayuki when Sanada clan left the residence is on site. Sanada clan Historical Museum is adjacent to the site.

== Gallery ==
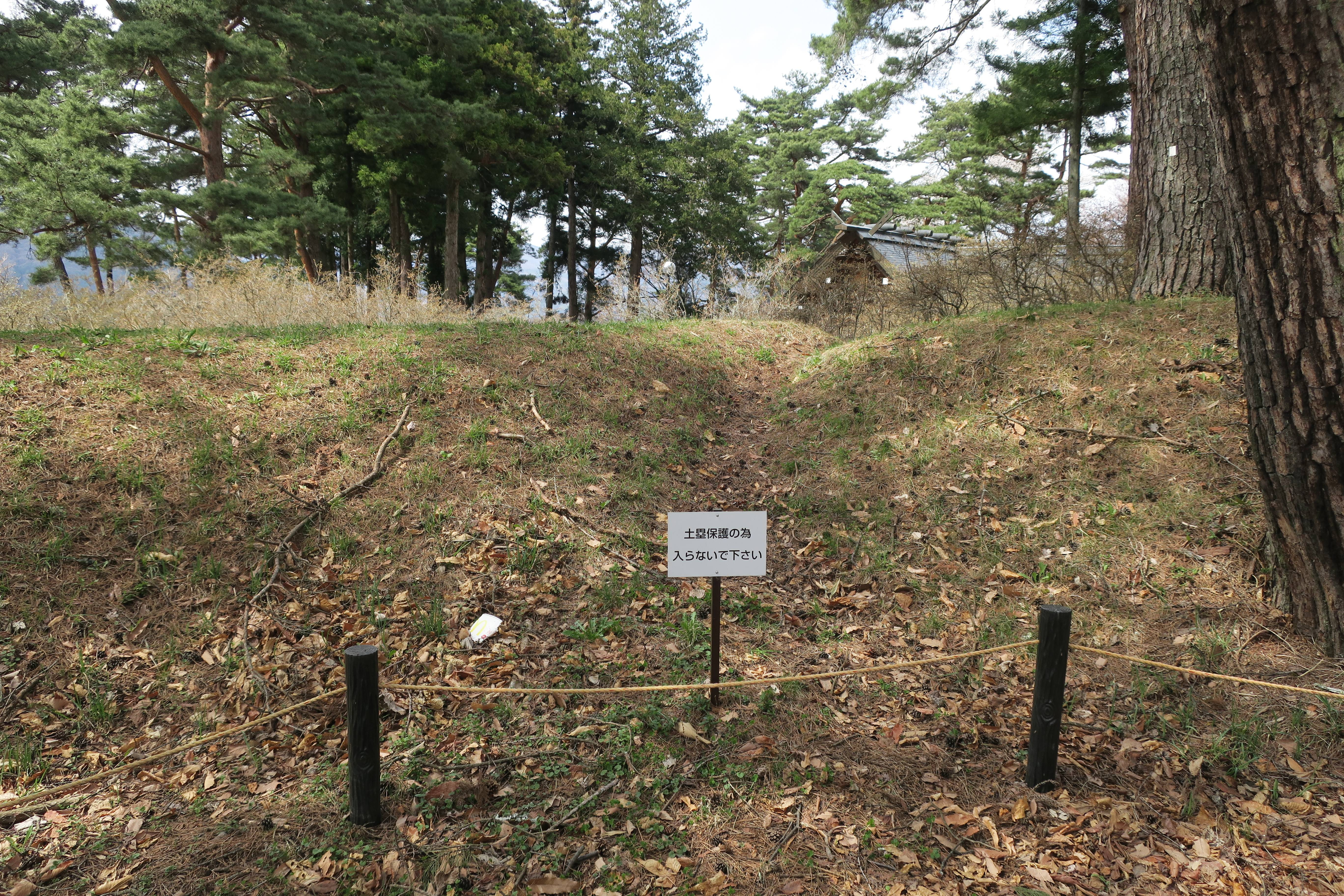
Earthwork of Sanada-shi Yakata

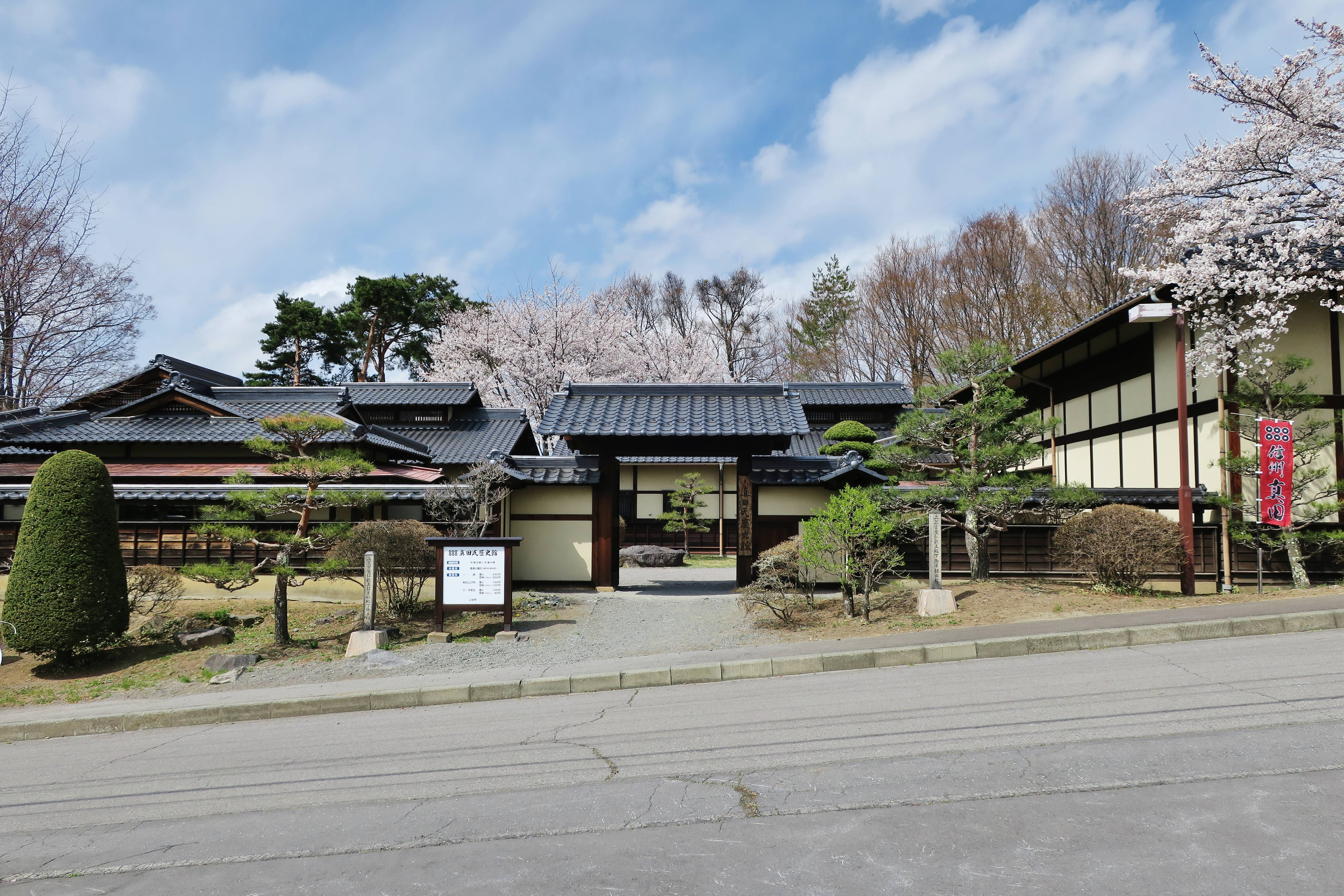
Sanada clan Historical Museum

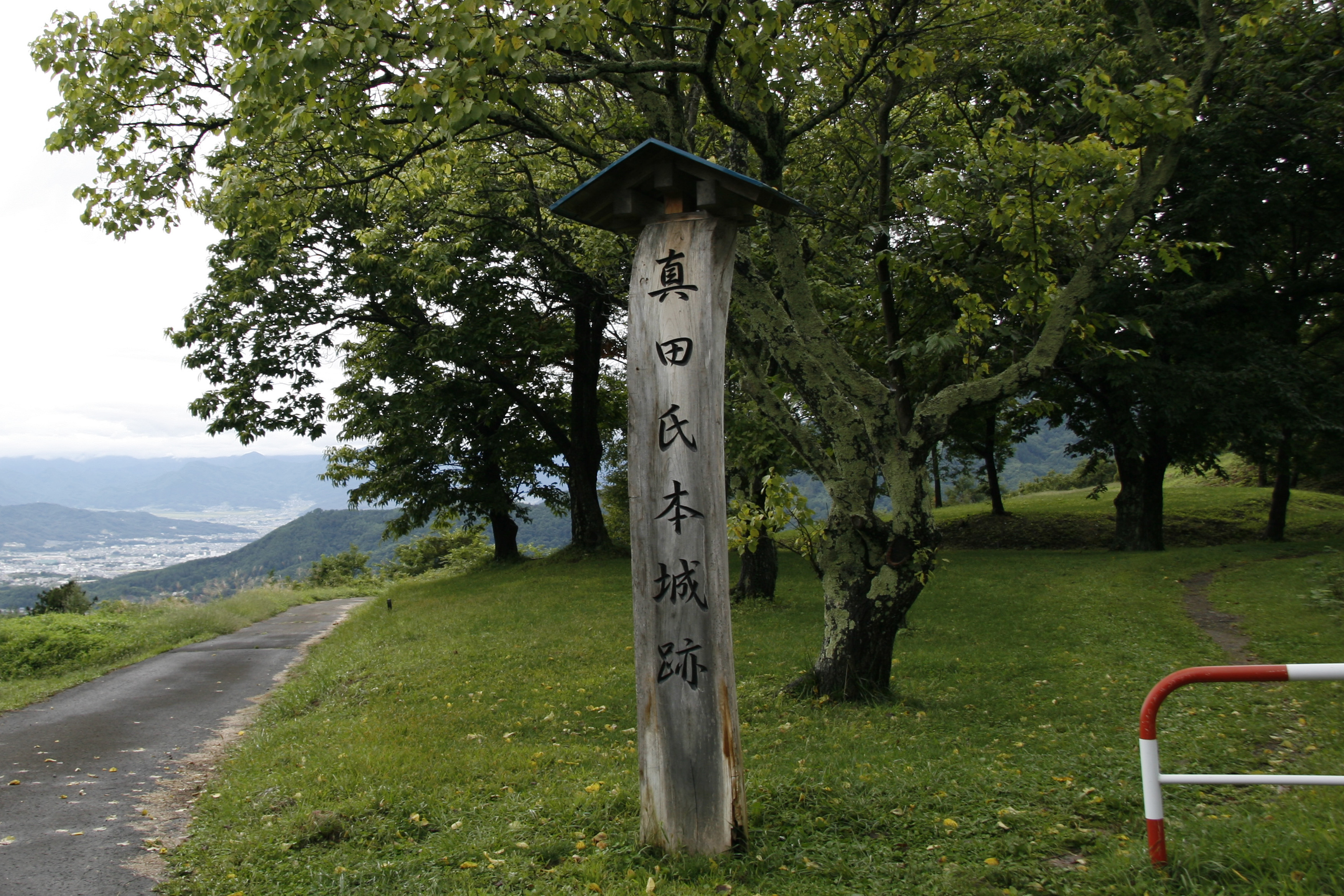
Sanada-shi Honjō Castle

== See also ==
- List of Historic Sites of Japan (Nagano)
- Sanada
