= Onsen-ji (Nagano) =

- 温泉寺
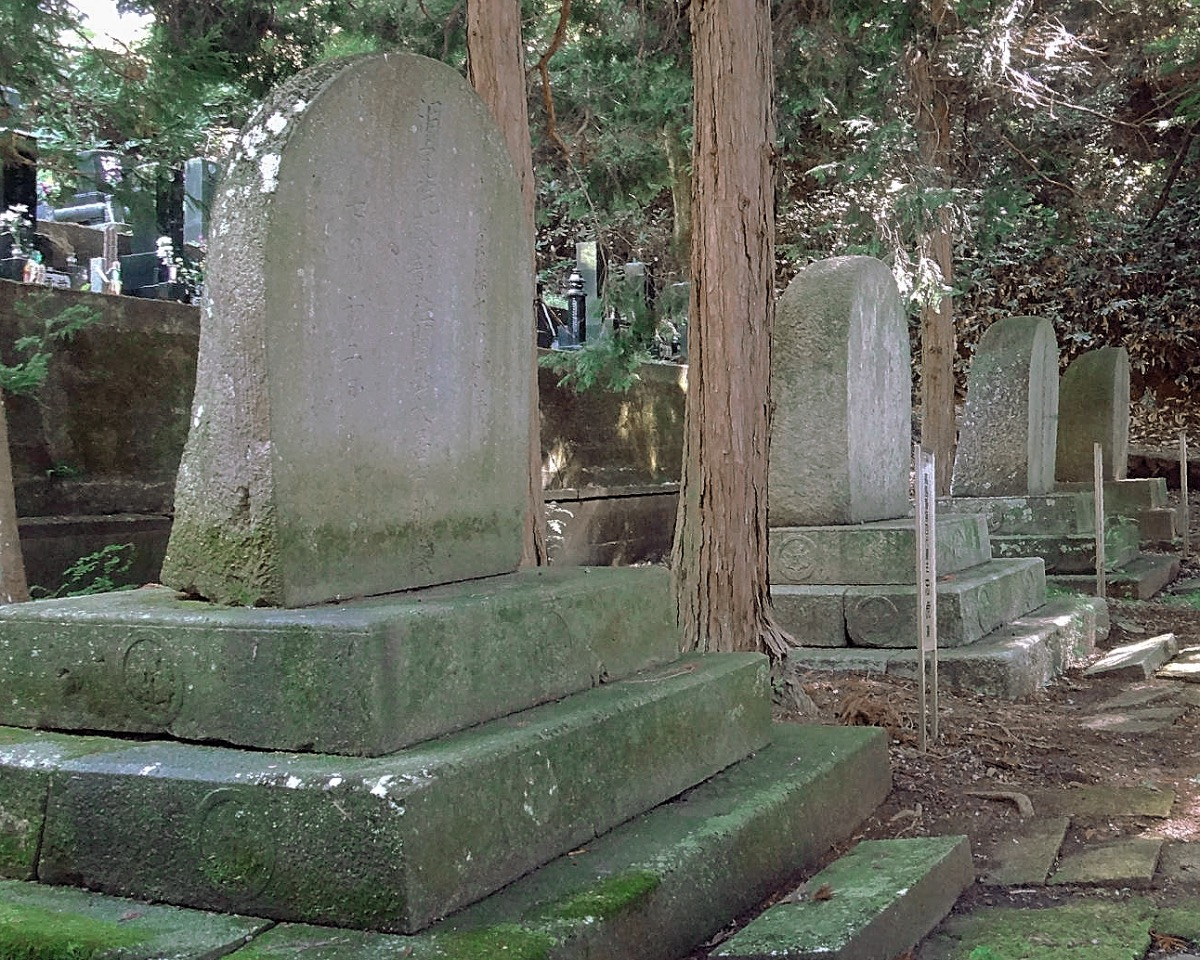
- Suwa clan Cemetery

- Onsen-ji Onsen-ji (Nagano) (Japan)

Religion
- Affiliation: Buddhism
- Deity: Yakushi Nyōrai
- Rite: Rinzai school

Location
- Location: 1-21-1 Yunowaki, Suwa-shi, Nagano-ken 392-0003
- Country: Japan
- Interactive map of Onsen-ji
- Coordinates: 36°03′01″N 138°07′09″E

Architecture
- Completed: 1640 AD

Onsen-ji (温泉寺) is a Buddhist temple belonging to the Rinzai school (Myōshin-ji branch) of Japanese Zen, located in the city of Suwa, Nagano, Japan. Its main image is a statue of Yakushi Nyōrai. The temple is located a 15-minute walk from Kami-Suwa Station.

== History ==
Onsen-ji was founded in 1640 AD as the bodaiji of the Suwa clan, daimyō of Takashima Domain; however, as all temple records were lost when the temple burned down in 1870. The current Sanmon was formerly a gate of Takashima Castle and was relocated to this site after that castle was demolished following the Meiji restoration. Likewise, the entry to the Hondō makes use of materials from the Noh stage formerly at Takashima Castle. The Kyōzō, built in 1780, is one of the few structures of the temple to have escaped the 1870 fire. The bell at Onsen-ji dates from the Muromachi period and is a Nagano Prefectural Important Cultural Property.

== Takashima Domain Suwa clan cemetery ==
The Takashima Domain Suwa clan cemetery (高島藩主諏訪家墓所) is located at Onsen-ji. The cemetery contains the graves of the second through the eighth generations of daimyō of Takashima Domain, together with the graves of their wives, consorts, and many of their children, for over 100 graves in total. The graves of the daimyō all have a similar gravestone, but only that of Suwa Tadatsune, the second daimyō has a wooden chapel. The cemetery was designated a National Historic Site of Japan in 2018.

== See also ==
- List of Historic Sites of Japan (Nagano)
