= List of historic sites of Japan (Nagano) =

This list is of the historic sites of Japan located within the Prefecture of Nagano.

== National Historic Sites ==
As of 1 August 2025, thirty-nine Sites have been designated as being of national significance (including one *Special Historic Site); the Nakasendō spans the prefectural borders with Gifu.

Site	Municipality	Comments	Image	Coordinates	Type	Ref.
*Togariishi stone age ruins 尖石石器時代遺跡 Togariishi sekki jidai iseki	Chino	see Togariishi Museum of Jōmon Archaeology	Togariishi Stone Age ruins	36°00′49″N 138°13′59″E	1	1178
Akyū ruins 阿久遺跡 Akyū iseki	Hara	Jōmon period settlement ruins	Akyū ruins	35°57′53″N 138°11′18″E	1	1198
Idojiri ruins 井戸尻遺跡 Idojiri iseki	Fujimi	Jōmon period settlement ruins	Idojiri ruins	35°52′40″N 138°16′44″E	1	1186
Former Nakagomi School 旧中込学校 kyū-Nakagomi gakkō	Saku	Meiji period Giyōfū-style building	Former Nakagomi School	36°14′14″N 138°28′20″E	4	1189
Matsushiro Literary and Military School 旧文武学校 kyū-Bunbu gakkō	Nagano	Bakumatsu period samurai school	Bunbu School	36°33′46″N 138°11′45″E	4	1182
Komagata ruins 駒形遺跡 Komagata iseki	Chino	Jōmon period settlement ruins	Komagata ruins	36°02′22″N 138°11′21″E	1	3216
Kōbōyama Kofun 弘法山古墳 Kōbōyama kofun	Matsumoto	Kofun-period burial mound	Kōbōyama Kofun	36°12′48″N 137°58′58″E	1	1193
Gonga Kanga ruins 恒川官衙遺跡 Gonga kanga iseki	Iida	Nara-Heian period government complex ruins		35°30′53″N 137°49′19″E	2	00003837
Takatō Castle ruins 高遠城跡 Takatō-jō ato	Ina	Edo period Castle	Takatō Castle ruins	35°50′02″N 138°03′47″E	2	1192
Takanashi clan fortified residence ruins 高梨氏館跡 Takanashi-shi yakata ato	Nakano	Muromachi-Sengoku period fortified manor site	Takanashi Family Fortified Residence ruins	36°44′41″N 138°22′36″E	2	00003515
Sano ruins 佐野遺跡 Sano iseki	Yamanouchi	Jōmon period settlement ruins		36°43′56″N 138°24′26″E	1	1194
Teranoura stone age settlement ruins 寺ノ浦石器時代住居跡 Teranoura sekki jidai jūkyo ato	Komoro	Jōmon period settlement ruins	Teranoura stone age settlement ruins	36°21′36″N 138°23′17″E	1	1170
Kobayashi Issa former residence 小林一茶旧宅 Kobayashi Issa kyū-taku	Shinano	Edo period poet residence	Kobayashi Issa Former Residence	36°48′18″N 138°12′22″E	8	1184
Matsushiro Castle and Shingoten ruins 松代城跡 附 新御殿跡 Matsushiro-jō ato tsuketari Shingoten ato	Nagano	Edo period castle	Matsushiro Castle Site and Shingoten Site	36°33′58″N 138°11′45″E	2	1199
Matsushiro Domain Sanada clan cemetery 松代藩主真田家墓所 Matsushiro-han-shu Sanada-ke bosho	Nagano	Edo period cemetery at Chōkoku-ji	Matsushiro Domain Sanada Clan Grave Site	36°33′54″N 138°12′20″E	7	1204
Matsumoto Castle 松本城 Matsumoto-jō	Matsumoto	Edo period castle	Matsumoto Castle	36°14′20″N 137°58′10″E	2	1167
Ueda Castle 上田城跡 Ueda-jō ato	Ueda	Edo period castle	Ueda Castle	36°24′14″N 138°14′42″E	2	1173
Uenodan stone age ruins 上之段石器時代遺跡 Uenodan sekki jidai iseki	Chino	Jōmon period settlement ruins		36°02′37″N 138°13′38″E	1	1179
Hanishina Kofun group 埴科古墳群 Hanishina kofun-gun	Nagano, Chikuma	Jōmon period kofun; designation includes Mori-Shōgunzuka Kofun (森将軍塚古墳), Ariakeyama-Shōgunzuka Kofun (有明山将軍塚古墳), Kurashina-Shōgunzuka Kofun (倉科将軍塚古墳), and Doguchi-Shōgunzuka Kofun (土口将軍塚古墳)	Hanishina Kofun group	36°31′53″N 138°08′16″E	1	1190
Shinano Kokubun-ji ruins 信濃国分寺跡 Shinano kokubunji ato	Ueda	provincial temple of Shinano Province	Shinano Kokubunji ruins	36°22′50″N 138°16′14″E	3	1168
Misaka Pass 神坂峠遺跡 Misaka-tōge iseki	Achi	Jōmon period relics	Misaka Pass	35°28′16″N 137°37′58″E	3	1200
Hoshikuso Pass obsidian mine site 星糞峠黒曜石原産地遺跡 Hoshikuso-tōge kokuyōseki gensanchi iseki	Nagawa	Jōmon period archaeological site		36°09′07″N 138°12′38″E	1	3280
Senryū-Shōgunzuka Kofun - Himezuka Kofun 川柳将軍塚古墳・姫塚古墳 Senryū-Shōgunzuka kofun・Himezuka kofun	Nagano	Kofun-period burial mound		36°34′11″N 138°06′34″E	1	1195
Ōmuro Kofun group 大室古墳群 Ōmuro kofun-gun	Nagano	Kofun-period burial mound	Ōmuro Kofun group	36°35′23″N 138°13′51″E	1	1195
Ōmiyama ruins 大深山遺跡 Ōmiyama iseki	Kawakami	Jōmon period settlement ruins	Ōmiyama ruins	35°58′39″N 138°33′56″E	1	1187
Nakasendō 中山道 Nakasendō	Nagawa, Nagiso	designation includes areas of Nakatsugawa and Mitake in Gifu Prefecture	Nakasendō	35°32′44″N 137°35′11″E	6	1203
Tobayama Cave 鳥羽山洞窟 Tobayama dōkutsu	Ueda	Jōmon to Heian period cave dwelling	Tobayama Cave	36°17′54″N 138°15′29″E	1	1196
Tochibaraiwakage ruins 栃原岩陰遺跡 Tochibaraiwakage iseki	Kitaaiki	Jōmon period settlement ruins	Tochibaraiwakage ruins	36°03′43″N 138°30′53″E	1	1202
Fukushima Barrier Site 福島関跡 Fukushima-no-seki ato	Kiso	Edo-period checkpoint on the Nakasendō	Fukushima Barrier Site	35°51′03″N 137°42′09″E	6	1197
Hiraide ruins 平出遺跡 Hiraide iseki	Shiojiri	Jōmon period settlement ruins	Hiraide ruins	36°06′13″N 137°56′32″E	1	1181
Yadegawa ruins 矢出川遺跡 Yadegawa iseki	Minamimaki	Japanese Paleolithic settlement ruins		35°56′46″N 138°29′01″E	1	1205
Nashikubo ruins 梨久保遺跡 Nashikubo iseki	Okaya	Jōmon period settlement ruins	Nashikubo ruins	36°05′18″N 138°03′34″E	1	1201
Tatsuoka Castle 龍岡城跡 Tatsuoka-jō	Saku	Bakumatsu period star fort	Tatsuoka Castle	36°11′46″N 138°30′06″E	2	1172
Intate stone age settlement ruins 戌立石器時代住居跡 Intate sekki jidai jūkyo ato	Tōmi	Jōmon period settlement ruins	Intate Stone Age Residence ruins	36°21′41″N 138°23′07″E	1	1169
Hoshigatō obsidian mine site 星ヶ塔黒曜石原産地遺跡 Hoshigatō kokuyōseki gensanchi iseki	Shimosuwa	Jōmon period archaeological site		36°06′12″N 138°06′36″E	1	00003894
Iida Kofun group 飯田古墳群 Iida kofun-gun	Iida	Kofun period tumuli cluster	Iida Kofun group	35°30′08″N 137°50′43″E	1	00003947
Ogasawara clan castle sites 小笠原氏城跡 Ogasawara-shi jō-seki	Matsumoto	Sengoku period castle ruins; designation includes the sites of Igawa Castle and Hayashi Castle	Ogasawara Clan Castle Sites	36°13′29″N 138°00′34″E	2	00003965
Takashima Domain Suwa clan cemetery 高島藩主諏訪家墓所 Takashima-han Suwa-ke bosho	Chino, Suwa	Edo period daimyō graveyard at Onsen-ji	Takashima Domain Suwa Clan Cemetery	36°03′01″N 138°07′09″E	7	00003966
Kōsakayama Site 香坂山遺跡; Kōsakayama iseki	Saku			36°16′20″N 138°35′53″E	1	

== Prefectural Historic Sites ==
As of 1 March 2021, sixty-eight Sites have been designated as being of prefectural importance.

Site	Municipality	Comments	Image	Coordinates	Type	Ref.
Sugadaira Karasawa Iwakage Site 菅平唐沢岩陰遺跡; Sugadaira Karasawa Iwakage iseki	Ueda			36°30′26″N 138°22′56″E		for all refs see
Gotenba Site 御殿場遺跡; Gotenba iseki	Ina			35°48′47″N 137°59′49″E		
Nakakoshi Site 中越遺跡; Nakakoshi iseki	Miyada			35°45′53″N 137°52′20″E		
Ikenodaira Goze-iwa Site 池ノ平御坐岩遺跡; Ikenodaira Goze-iwa iseki	Miyada			36°06′18″N 138°13′59″E		
Wappara Site 上原遺跡; Wappara iseki	Ōmachi			36°30′59″N 137°47′55″E		
Kuribayashi Site 栗林遺跡; Kuribayashi iseki	Nakano			36°44′41″N 138°19′25″E		
Mikawada Ōtsuka Kofun 三河田大塚古墳; Mikawada Ōtsuka kofun	Saku			36°14′56″N 138°27′48″E		
Nakasone Shin-Ōzuka Kofun 中曽根親王塚古墳; Nakasone Shin-Ōzuka kofun	Tōmi			36°22′05″N 138°18′14″E		
Shimosuwa Aozuka Kofun 下諏訪青塚古墳; Shimosuwa Aozuka kofun	Shimosuwa			36°04′35″N 138°05′21″E		
Matsushima Ōbo Kofun 松島王墓古墳; Matsushima Ōbo kofun	Minowa			35°55′21″N 137°59′00″E		
Osarudō Kofun 御猿堂古墳(上川路 西第1号); Osarudō kofun (Kamikawaji nishi dai ichi-gō)	Iida			35°27′42″N 137°48′45″E		
Shirotayama Kitsunezuka Kofun 代田山狐塚古墳; Shirotayama Kitsunezuka kofun	Iida			35°29′34″N 137°50′08″E		
Haritsuka Kofun 針塚古墳; Haritsuka kofun	Matsumoto			36°14′00″N 138°00′05″E		
Sugama Ōzuka Kofun 菅間王塚古墳; Sugama Ōzuka kofun	Nagano			36°33′55″N 138°12′13″E		
Kuwanei Soratsuka 桑根井空塚; Kuwanei Soratsuka	Nagano			36°33′05″N 138°13′51″E		
Hatchō Yoroizuka 八丁鎧塚; Hatchō Yoroizuka	Suzaka			36°37′25″N 138°19′27″E		
Nanase Futagotsuka Kofun 七瀬双子塚古墳; Nanase Futagotsuka kofun	Nakano			36°45′22″N 138°20′37″E		
Takatōyama Kofun 高遠山古墳; Takatōyama kofun	Nakano			36°43′44″N 138°22′40″E		
Kansukeyama Kofun 勘介山古墳; Kansukeyama kofun	Iiyama			36°49′27″N 138°20′39″E		
Netsuka Site 根塚遺跡; Netsuka iseki	Kijimadaira			36°51′13″N 138°24′03″E		
Misayama Site 御射山遺跡; Misayama iseki	Suwa			36°06′44″N 138°10′20″E		
Suwa Taisha Kami-sha Maemiya Site 諏訪大社上社前宮神殿跡; Suwa Taisha kami-sha maemiya gōdono ato	Chino			35°59′28″N 138°07′59″E		
Ryōzen-ji Site 霊仙寺跡; Ryōzen-ji ato	Shinano			36°44′57″N 138°10′07″E		
Togakushi Jinja Sacred Site 戸隠神社信仰遺跡; Togakushi Jinja shinkō iseki	Nagano, Ogawa			36°44′32″N 138°05′06″E		
Tomono Castle ruins 伴野城跡; Tomono-jō ato	Saku			36°13′32″N 138°28′10″E		
Nenoi Clan Yakata ruins 根井氏館跡; Nenoi-shi yakata ato	Saku			36°15′35″N 138°27′17″E		
Ōi Castle ruins 大井城跡; Ōi-jō ato	Saku			36°16′30″N 138°28′56″E		
Iwao Castle ruins 岩尾城跡; Iwao-jō ato	Saku			36°15′13″N 138°25′44″E		
Hiraga Clan Castle Site 平賀氏城跡; Hiraga-shi-jō seki	Saku			36°13′33″N 138°30′32″E		
Toishi Castle ruins 戸石城跡; Toishi-jō ato	Ueda			36°25′28″N 138°17′29″E		
Shioda Castle ruins 塩田城跡; Shioda-jō ato	Ueda			36°20′27″N 138°11′44″E		
Sanada-shi Yakata Site 真田氏館跡; Sanada-shi yakata ato	Ueda			36°25′53″N 138°18′58″E		
Suwa Clan Castle Site 諏訪氏城跡; Suwa-shi-jō ato	Suwa, Chino			36°01′31″N 138°08′02″E		
Uenodaira Castle ruins 上ノ平城跡; Uenodaira-jō ato	Minowa			35°55′52″N 138°00′06″E		
Fukuyo Castle ruins 福与城跡; Fukuyo-jō ato	Minowa			35°53′45″N 138°00′01″E		
Funayama Castle ruins 船山城跡; Funayama-jō ato	Matsukawa, Nakagawa			35°36′54″N 137°54′51″E		
Suzuoka Castle ruins 鈴岡城跡; Suzuoka-jō ato	Iida			35°29′02″N 137°49′36″E		
Matsuo Castle ruins 松尾城跡; Matsuo-jō ato	Iida			35°29′14″N 137°49′41″E		
Ogasawara Clan Castle Sites 小笠原氏城跡; Ogasawara-shi jō-seki	Matsumoto	also a National Historic Site		36°13′29″N 138°00′34″E		
Aoyagi Clan Fortified Residence Site 青柳氏城館跡; Aoyagi-shi jōkan ato	Chikuhoku			36°25′52″N 138°02′01″E		
Omi Castle ruins 麻績城跡; Omi-jō ato	Omi			36°28′05″N 138°02′42″E		
Takei Castle ruins 武居城跡; Takei-jō ato	Asahi			36°07′01″N 137°52′52″E		
Tsumago Castle ruins 妻籠城跡; Tsumago-jō ato	Nagiso			35°35′05″N 137°35′44″E		
Inoue Clan Castle ruins 井上氏城跡; Inoue-shi jō-seki	Suzaka			36°37′41″N 138°16′53″E		
Takanashi Clan Castle ruins 高梨氏城跡; Takanashi-shi jō-seki	Nakano			36°44′37″N 138°22′33″E		
Iiyama Castle ruins 飯山城跡; Iiyama-jō ato	Iiyama			36°51′24″N 138°22′01″E		
Murakami Clan Fortified Residence and Castle Site 村上氏城館跡; Murakami-shi jōkan ato	Chikuma, Sakaki					
Makinoshima Castle ruins 牧ノ島城跡; Makinoshima-jō ato	Nagano			36°33′43″N 137°59′56″E		
Uchibori Residence Site 内堀館跡; Uchibori-tate ato	Nakano			36°45′00″N 138°19′08″E		
Minamihonjō Castle ruins 南本城城跡; Minamihonjō-jō ato	Iida			35°32′08″N 137°51′08″E		
Takemizuwake Jinja Kannushi Matsuda Family Residence Site 武水別神社神主松田家館跡; Takemizuwake Jinja kannushi Matsuda-ke tate ato	Chikuma			36°31′08″N 138°06′06″E		
Yamaura Shinyū Residence Site 山浦真雄宅跡; Yamaura Shinyū taku ato	Tōmi			36°20′23″N 138°22′27″E		
Tada Kasuke Residence Site 多田加助宅跡; Tada Kasuke taku ato	Azumino			36°16′30″N 137°53′46″E		
Sakuma Shōzan Residence Site 佐久間象山宅跡; Sakuma Shōzan taku ato	Nagano			36°33′33″N 138°11′45″E		
Etan Zenji Site Shōju-an 恵端禅師旧跡正受庵; Etan Zenji kyūseki Shōjuan	Iiyama			36°51′07″N 138°21′22″E		
Fukushima Masanori Residence Site 福島正則屋敷跡; Fukushima Masanori yashiki ato	Takayama			36°39′58″N 138°20′53″E		
Gorobee Irrigation Channel 五郎兵衛用水; Gorobee yōsui	Saku			36°15′34″N 138°23′35″E		
Miyota ichirizuka 御代田一里塚; Miyota ichirizuka	Miyota			36°19′13″N 138°30′38″E		
Namiai Barrier Site (Namiai Kuchidome Bansho) 浪合関(浪合口留番所)跡; Namiai-seki (Namiai Kuchidome bansho) ato	Achi			35°22′21″N 137°40′47″E		
Haibara Pasture Site 埴原牧跡; Haibara-maki ato	Matsumoto			36°11′38″N 138°00′40″E		
Former Nomugi Kaidō 旧野麦街道 kyū-Nomugi kaidō	Matsumoto			36°02′54″N 137°36′58″E		
Kiso no Kakehashi Site 木曽桟跡; Kiso kakehashi ato	Agematsu			35°48′24″N 137°41′16″E		
Zakōji Stone River Guards 座光寺の石川除; Zakōji no ishi kawayoke	Iida			35°31′58″N 137°51′14″E		
Mikage Jin'ya Site 御影陣屋跡; Mikage jin'ya ato	Komoro			36°18′10″N 138°28′24″E		
Ina Prefectural Office (Iijima Jin'ya) Site 伊那県庁(飯島陣屋)跡; Ina kenchō (Iijima jin'ya) ato	Iijima			35°40′49″N 137°55′30″E		
Nakano Prefectural Office (Nakano Jin'ya) Site 中野県庁(中野陣屋)跡; Nakano kenchō (Nakano jin'ya) ato	Nakano			36°44′41″N 138°22′22″E		
Kamai-an 釜井庵; Kamai-an	Shiojiri			36°06′26″N 137°54′40″E		
Hokkō Zenji Grave Marker 北高禅師墓碑; Hokkō Zenji bohi	Saku					

== Municipal Historic Sites ==
As of 1 May 2019, a further six hundred and seventy-three Sites have been designated as being of municipal importance.

== See also ==
- Cultural Properties of Japan
- Shinano Province
- Nagano Prefectural Museum of History
- List of Places of Scenic Beauty of Japan (Nagano)
- List of Cultural Properties of Japan - paintings (Nagano)
- List of Cultural Properties of Japan - historical materials (Nagano)
