= Gonga Kanga ruins =

- 恒川官衙遺跡 (Japanese)
- Gonga Kanga Ruins Gonga Kanga ruins (Japan)
- 35.53171483°N 137.86298983°E
- Type: settlement
- Periods: Nara to Heian period
- Location: Iida, Nagano, Japan
- Region: Chūbu region

Site notes
- Public access: No public facilities

The Gonga Kanga ruins (恒川官衙遺跡, Gonga kanga iseki) is an archaeological site containing the ruins of the Nara to early Heian period government administrative complex for Ina District, Shinano Province, located in what is now part of the town of Iida, Nagano in the Chūbu region of Japan. The ruins were designated a National Historic Site of Japan in 2014, with the area under protection extended in 2016.

== Overview ==
In the late Nara period, after the establishment of a centralized government under the Ritsuryō system, local rule over the provinces was standardized under a kokufu (provincial capital), and each province was divided into smaller administrative districts, known as (郡, gun, kōri), composed of 2–20 townships in 715 AD. An administrative complex, or Kanga (官衙) was constructed for each gun with a tax warehouse complex, per a common template.

The Gonga Kanga ruins is located in the southern end of Ina Valley at the southern tip of modern Nagano Prefecture at an elevation of 320 to 430 meters. An archaeological excavation of the ruins began in 1974 by the Iida City Board of Education noted that the layout of the ruins was that of a typical district office during the Nara period, and further excavation surveys confirmed the extent of the ruins from 1986 to 1984.

The site dates from latter half of the 7th century and appears to have been in use through the early 10th century. It was a trapezoidal enclosure measuring 215 meters on its long side by 150 meters on its short side. The enclosure was not square, as was typical with similar complexes in other locations, as it was built next to an earlier keyhole-shaped kofun tumulus, which was not included within its borders. Inside the enclosure, the foundations of a granary complex for the storage of tax rice, an administrative building with an attached kitchen, and the remnants of a moat were discovered. The complex was destroyed and rebuilt several times through the Heian period. In the center of the complex was a pond fed by a natural spring, from which a large number of wooden artifacts were recovered. These included wooden tag markers, roof tiles, belt decorations, a large number of pottery shards, and numerous wadōkaichin coins, as well as objects which were clearly of some ritual significance.

The site is a two minutes walk from Motozenkoji Station on the JR East Iida Line.

== See also ==
- List of Historic Sites of Japan (Nagano)
