= Chōkoku-ji (Nagano) =

Buddhist temple in Nagano, Japan

Chōkoku-ji 長国寺
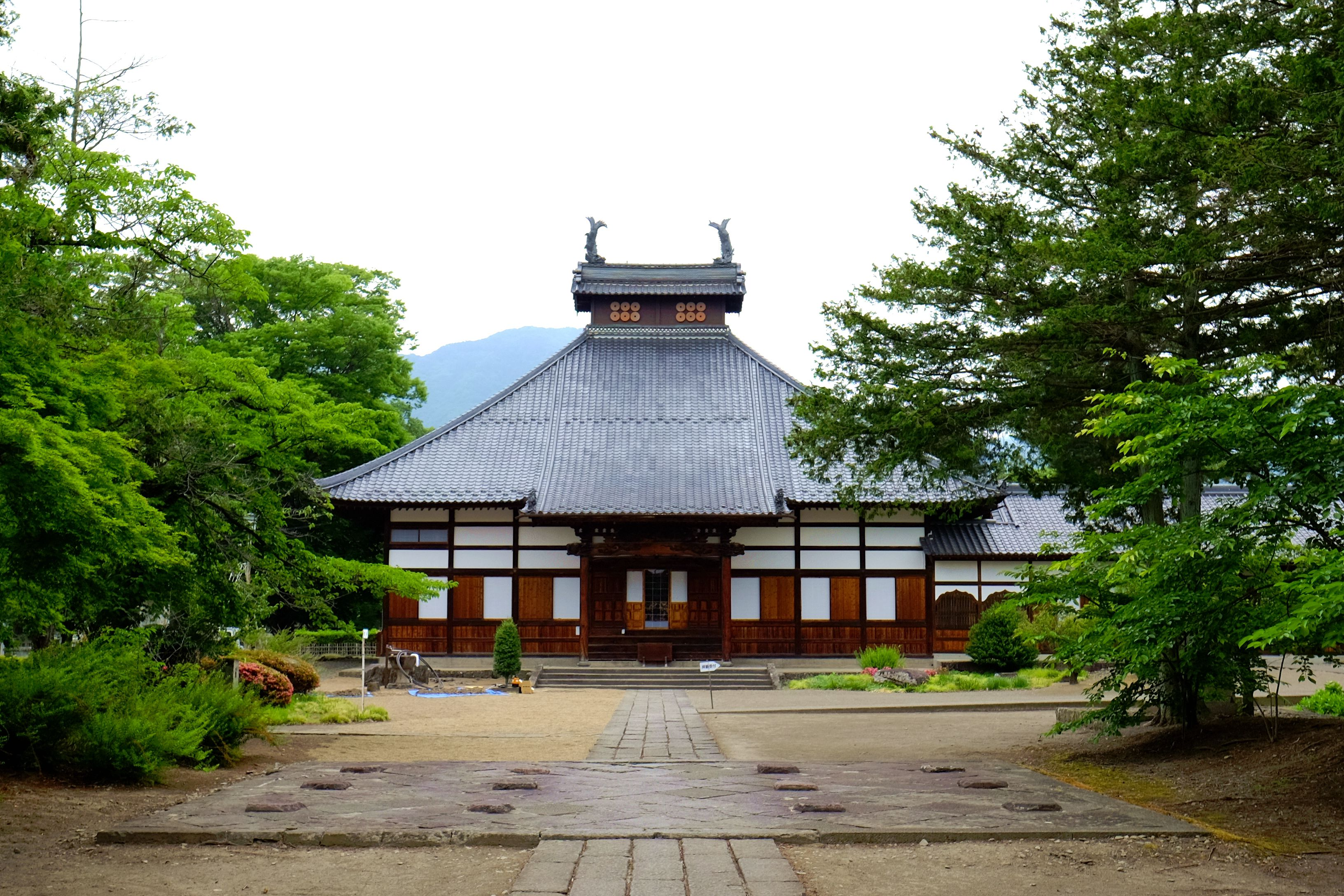
- Chōkoku-ji main hall

- Chōkoku-ji Chōkoku-ji (Nagano) (Japan)

Religion
- Affiliation: Buddhism
- Deity: Shaka Nyōrai
- Rite: Sōtō sect

Location
- Location: 1015 Matsushiro, Matsushiro-cho, Nagano-shi, Nagano-ken
- Country: Japan
- Interactive map of Chōkoku-ji 長国寺
- Coordinates: 36°33′54″N 138°12′20″E

Architecture
- Founder: Sanada Yukitaka
- Completed: 1547

Website
- chokoku-ji.jp

Chōkoku-ji (長国寺) is a Buddhist temple belonging to the Sōtō sect of Japanese Zen located in the former town of Matsushiro (presently part of the city of Nagano in Nagano Prefecture, Japan. It is the mortuary temple of the Sanada clan, local warlords in the Sengoku period and daimyō of Matsushiro Domain under the Edo period Tokugawa shogunate.

== History ==
Chōkoku-ji was originally founded by Sanada Yukitaka in 1547 in what is now part of the city of Ueda, Nagano. After the Tokugawa shogunate relocated the Sanada clan to neighboring Matsushiro, Sanada Nobuyuki physically relocated the temple and its graveyard to its present location, and granted the temple a stipend of 200 koku for its upkeep. As a seminary and training center for Sōtō sect monks, the temple grew to a large size and was also awarded an additional 100 koku directly from the shogunate. However, the temple experienced a number of major disasters, including a fire in 1717 and flooding in 1742. It was rebuilt in 1810, only to be almost completely razed by a fire in 1872. The present main hall is a reconstruction from 1886. For many years, the rectory of the temple was a former structure of the Matsushiro Literary and Military School; however, that structure was returned to its original location and replaced with a modern building in 1997. Five of the memorial chapels to the Sanada daimyō were among the few structures to have survived the 1872 fire, and of these five, the chapels to the first, third and fourth Sanada daimyō still exist.

== Sanada clan cemetery ==
The Matsushiro Domain Sanada Clan Cemetery (松代藩主真田家墓所, Matsushiro-han-shu Sanada-ke bosho) was designated a National Historic Site of Japan in 1987. The cemetery covers 800 square meters, and contains 33 graves of the ten successive generations daimyō along with a number of their children. The Sengoku period warlords Sanada Nobutsuna, Sanada Masayuki and Sanada Yukimura are also represented. However, the graves of their wives and concubines are not located within this cemetery, but are to be found at a different location.

The mortuary chapel of Sanada Nobuyuki, with black-lacquer walls, irimoya roof and ornate carvings, is a National Important Cultural Property of Japan. It was built in 1660. The memorial chapels to Sanada Yukimichi (built in 1727) and Sanada Nobuhiro (built in 1736) are both Nagano Prefectural Important Cultural Properties.

The grave of Onda Tamichika (1717–1762) a noted karō of Matsushiro Domain, is a Nagano City Important Cultural Property.

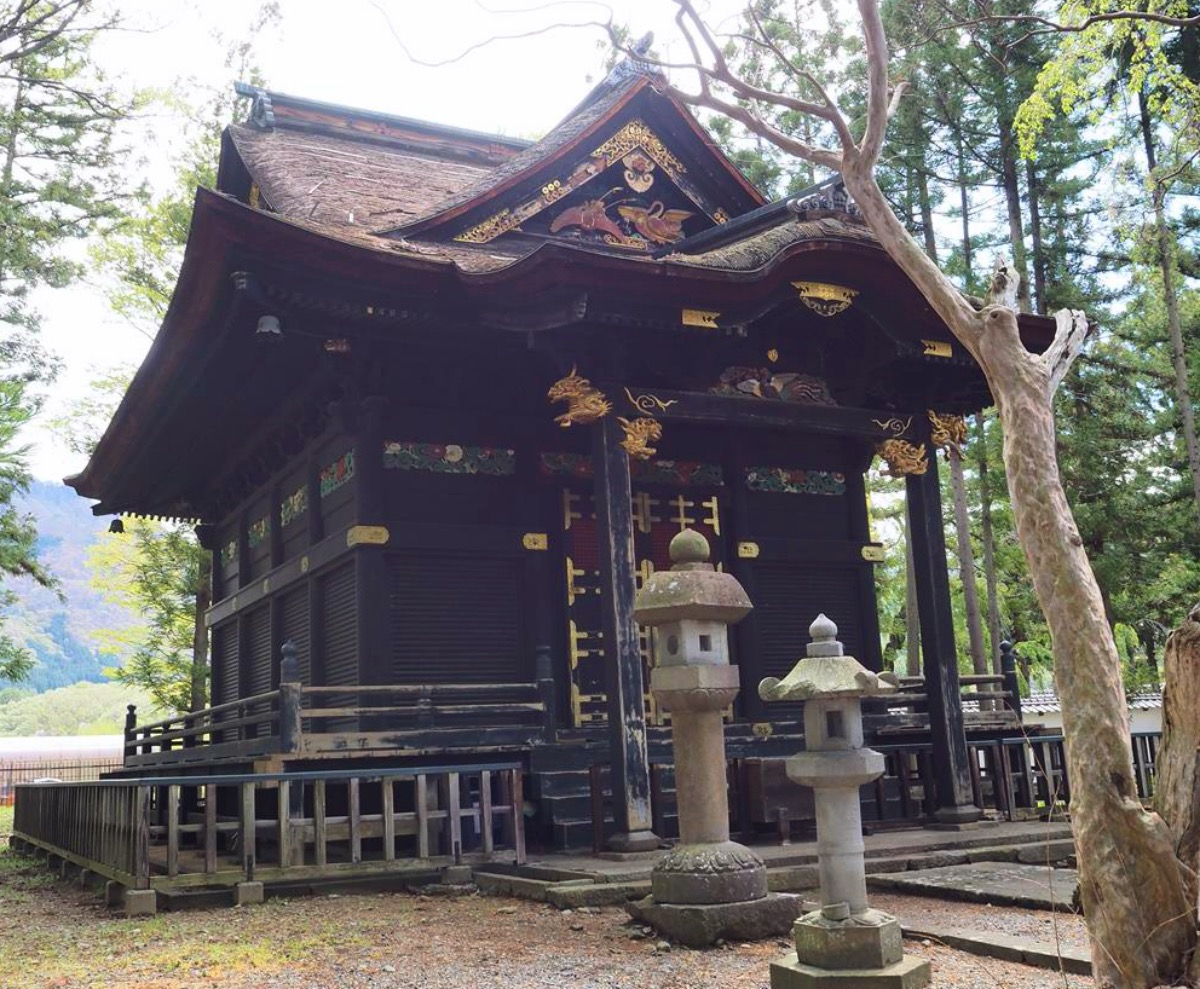
Sanada Nobuyuki Byosho

The temple is approximately 25 minutes by car from Nagano Station.

== See also ==
- List of Historic Sites of Japan (Nagano)
