= Iida Kofun group =

Iida Kofun cluster
- 飯田古墳群 (Japanese)
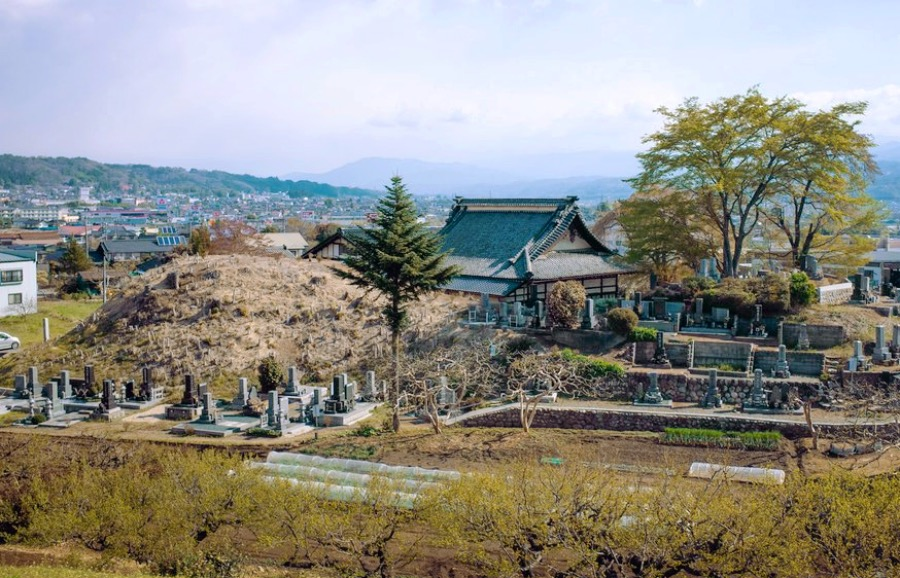
- Iinuma Unzaiji Kofun

- Iida Kofun cluster Iida Kofun group (Japan)
- 35°30′08″N 137°50′43″E
- Type: kofun
- Periods: Kofun period
- Location: Iida, Nagano, Japan
- Region: Chūbu region

History
- Built: late 5th to late 6th century AD

Site notes
- Public access: Yes (no facilities)

The Iida Kofun cluster (飯田古墳群, IIda Kofun-gun) is group kofun burial mounds located in the Shimoida neighborhood of the city of Iida, Nagano in the Chūbu region of Japan. Thirteen tumuli have been collectively protected as a National Historic Site since 2016.

== Outline ==
In the Shimoina area of southern Nagano prefecture is a group of ancient burial mounds distributed on river terraces of the right bank of the Tenryū River. There were once more than 520 kofun in Iida, of which a total of 22 are collectively called the "Iida Kofun cluster". These tumuli consist of 18 keyhole-shaped (zenpō-kōen-fun (前方後円墳)) and four scallop-shaped hotatekaigata-kofun (帆立貝形古墳) tumuli. The presence of so many of this style of tumuli point to a very strong political and cultural connection to the ancient Yamato kingdom. The Iida tumulus group is presumed to have been built in the middle-late Kofun period in the latter half of the 5th century and the end of the 6th century. During this period, it is postulated that the Iida area was a major horse breeding base for the Yamato kingdom, and the introduction of horses led to the development of inland transportation networks and inter-regional trade, which is reflected in various aspects of each tumulus. Of the group, 11 keyhole-shaped and two scallop-shaped tumulus received National Historic Site designation in 2016.

The largest of these tumuli is the Unsaiji Kofun (雲彩寺古墳, Unsaiji kofun), also known as the Iinuma Tenjindsuka Kofun, which is a keyhole-shaped tumulus with a total length of 74.5 meters. The burial chamber is a lateral type stone corridor with an entrance to the west, with the total length of 13 meters. The entrance is blocked, but the back wall on the east side has been removed. The length of the chamber itself is 5.7 meters by 2.3 meters, with a height of 1.7 meters. It was opened in the Edo period, at which time bronze mirrors, beads, rings, horse harnesses, and pottery was excavated, but most of these artifacts have been lost. The neighboring Unsai-ji temple, whose main hall partially encroaches on the tumulus, has preserved a golden ring and two bells from a horse harness. The tumulus was built in the middle of the 6th century. It was designated a Nagano Prefectural Historic Site in 1965.

Unit	Kofun name	Location	Coordinates	Type	Length	Burial Chamber	Date	Remarks
Zakoji	Takaoka No.1 Kofun	Zakoji	35°32′6.33″N 137°51′47.03″E	keyhole	72.3m	horizontal	early 6th c	
Kamigo	Unsaiji Kofun	Kamisatoiinuma	35°30′45.40″N 137°50′47.96″E	keyhole	74.5m	horizontal	early 6c	
Matsuo	Misajiro Shishidsuka Kofun	Matsuomisajiro	35°29′59.80″N 137°50′48.76″E	keyhole	60.0m		late 5c	
Matsuo	Misayama Shishidsuka Kofun	Matsuohisai	35°30′6.37″N 137°50′24.56″E	keyhole	58.0m	horizontal	late 5c/early 6c	
Matsuo	Himedsuka Kofun	Matsuoagemizo	35°30′11.94″N 137°50′48.36″E	keyhole	40.0m	horizontal	early 6c	
Matsuo	Agemizo Tenjindsuka Kofun	Matsuoagemizo	35°30′7.80″N 137°50′42.47″E	keyhole	41.5m	horizontal	mid 6c	
Matsuo	Okandsuka Kofun	Matsuoagemizo	35°30′8.62″N 137°50′37.92″E	keyhole	50m	horizontal	late 6c	
Tatsuoka	Otsuka Kofun	Kiribayashi	35°28′9.79″N 137°49′19.50″E	keyhole	50m	vertical	late 5c	
Tatsuoka	Tsukahara Futagodsuka Kofun	Kiribayashi	35°27′53.65″N 137°49′14.26″E	keyhole	73m	vertical	late 5c	
Tatsuoka	Kagamidsuka Kofun	Kiribayashi	35°27′53.49″N 137°49′8.63″E	scallop	45m	vertical	late 5c	
Tatsuoka	Yoroidsuka Kofun	Kiribayashi	35°27′51.03″N 137°49′9.41″E	scallop	45m	vertical	late 5c	
Tatsuoka	Osarudo Kofun	Kiribayashi	35°27′41.76″N 137°48′44.56″E	keyhole	65.4m	horizontal	mid 6c	bronze mirror (ICP) found
Tatsuoka	Masedsuka Kofun	Kamikawaji	35°27′48.68″N 137°48′51.50″E	keyhole	46.4m	horizontal	late 6c	last constructed

== See also ==
- List of Historic Sites of Japan (Nagano)
