= Teranoura stone age settlement ruins =

Archaeological site in Japan

- 寺ノ浦石器時代住居跡 (Japanese)
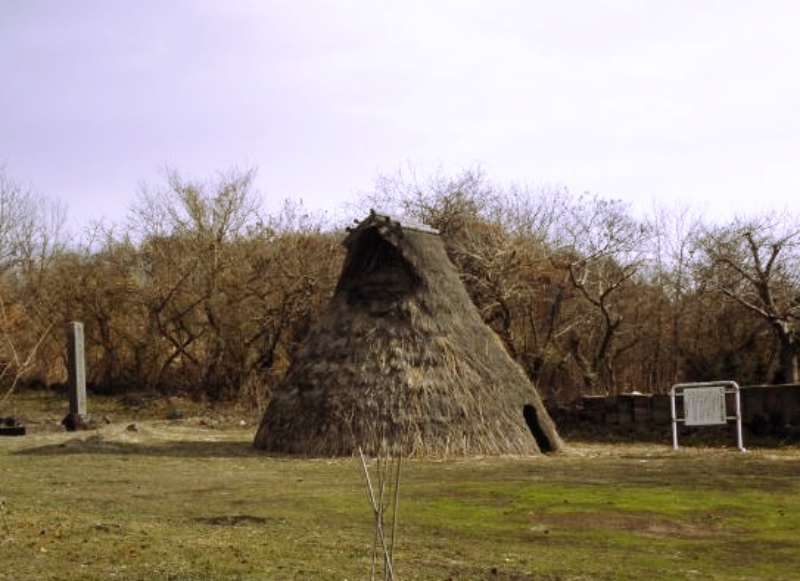
- reconstructed pit house at Teranoura Ruins

- Teranoura stone age settlement ruins Teranoura stone age settlement ruins (Japan)
- 36°21′36″N 138°23′17″E
- Type: settlement
- Periods: Jōmon period
- Location: Komoro, Nagano, Japan
- Region: Chūbu region

Site notes
- Elevation: 770 m (2,530 ft)
- Area: 7,234 m^{2} (77,870 sq ft)
- Public access: Yes (archaeological park)

The Teranoura stone age settlement ruins (寺ノ浦石器時代住居跡, Teranoura sekki jidai jūkyo ato) is an archaeological site containing the ruins of a late-Jōmon period settlement located in the Ikojinoura neighborhood of the city of Komoro, Nagano in the Chūbu region of Japan. The ruins were designated a National Historic Site of Japan in 1933. The site was the starting point for Jōmon period studies in the southern area of Mount Asama.

== Overview ==
The Teranoura site is located on the hilly southern slopes of Sanpogamine, a mountain in the outskirts of Komoro at an elevation of approximately 770 meters, and some 500 meters from the Oshimizawa River. It was first excavated in the 1930s, during which time the traces of pit dwellings, some with cobblestone floors, and a forge for smelting iron, along with numerous pottery shards, stone axes, whetstones and stone tools were discovered. A number of Japanese wolf fangs were also recovered. It is highly probable that house sites overlapped from different periods of time, as a number of hearth sites were discovered within the 12 meter east-to-west by 12.8 meter north-to-south ruin. A reconstructed pit house was later erected at the site, but there are no other public facilities. The site is approximately 16 minutes by car from Shigeno Station on the Shinano Railway.

== See also ==
- List of Historic Sites of Japan (Nagano)
