= Ōmuro Kofun group =

Group of burial mounds

Ōmuro Kofun Group
- 大室古墳群 (Japanese)
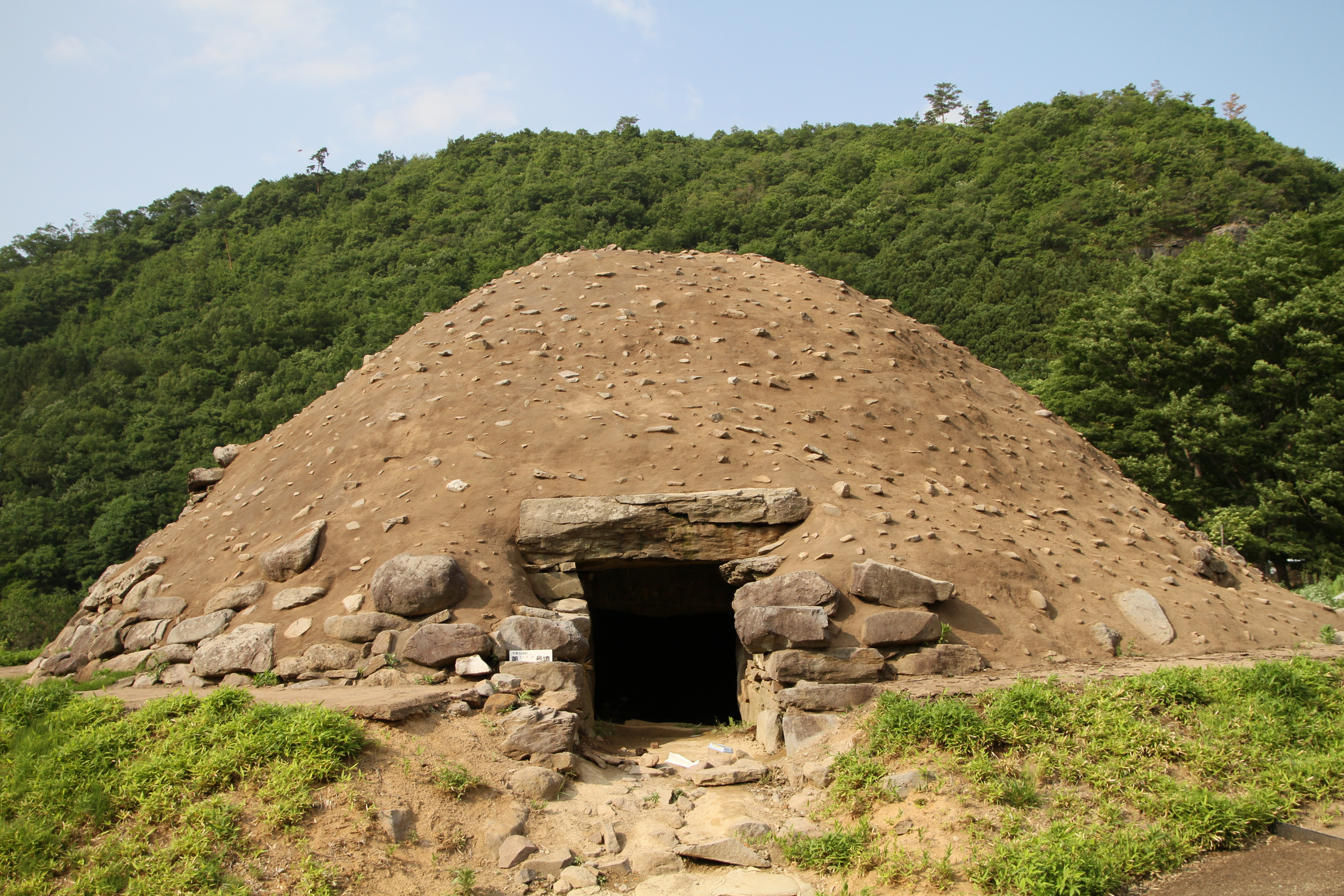
- Kofun No.244 is the largest in the Ōmuro Kofun Group

- Ōmuro Kofun Group Ōmuro Kofun group (Japan)
- 36°35′23″N 138°13′51″E
- Type: kofun
- Periods: Kofun period
- Location: Nagano, Nagano, Japan
- Region: Chubu region

Site notes
- Public access: Yes (archaeological park)

Ōmuro Kofun Group (大室古墳群, Ōmuro kofun-gun) is a group of late Kofun period burial mounds located in the Matsushiro neighborhood of the city of Nagano in the Chubu region of Japan. The site was collectively designated a National Historic Site of Japan in 1997.

== Overview ==
The Ōmuro Kofun Group is a large necropolis consisting of over 500 tumuli spread across two valleys on the south side of the Chikuma River at an elevation of 350 to 500 meters approximately six kilometers southeast of Nagano city. The tombs were built over a 250-year period from the 5th to the 8th centuries. They have been grouped by archaeologists into five groups ( Kanaiyama, Kitatani, Kajo, Omurodani, and Kitayama) by their geographic location, stretching across an area of roughly 2.5 square kilometers.

There is only one keyhole-shaped kofun (zenpō-kōen-fun (前方後円墳)), but at least 330 smaller circular-shaped kofun (empun (円墳)) made of stacked river stones from the Chikuma River. Most of these circular-shaped kofun have a diameter of approximately ten meters, and there is no other burial mound cluster in Japan where there are so many such circular-shaped kofun in such a small area. These mounds can be divided into 40 different variations, some with a scallop-shaped stone burial chamber, or with a triangular gabled burial chamber ceiling. Theories that these tombs were built by immigrants to Japan from the ancient Korean states of Goguryeo or Baekje remain controversial. Excavated grave goods include Sue ware and Haji ware pottery, bronze mirrors, armor, swords, horse fittings and jewelry. The number of horse bones found was unusually large, and included the skull of a horse which was buried in the vestibule of one of the horizontal burial chambers.

The site is now an archaeological park with a museum, the Ōmuro Kofun Museum (大室古墳館, Ōmuro kofun-kan) displaying some of the artifacts discovered.

== Access ==
- By car, 15 minutes from the Nagano IC on the Jōshin-etsu Expressway
- By bus, 20 minutes on foot from Ōmuro Station (大室駅, Ōmuro eki) (there are sign posts from the bus stop). From JR East Nagano Station, take the Nagaden Bus, No. 8, the Suzaka-Yashima Line, departing from the south exit of Nagano Station.

== Gallery ==
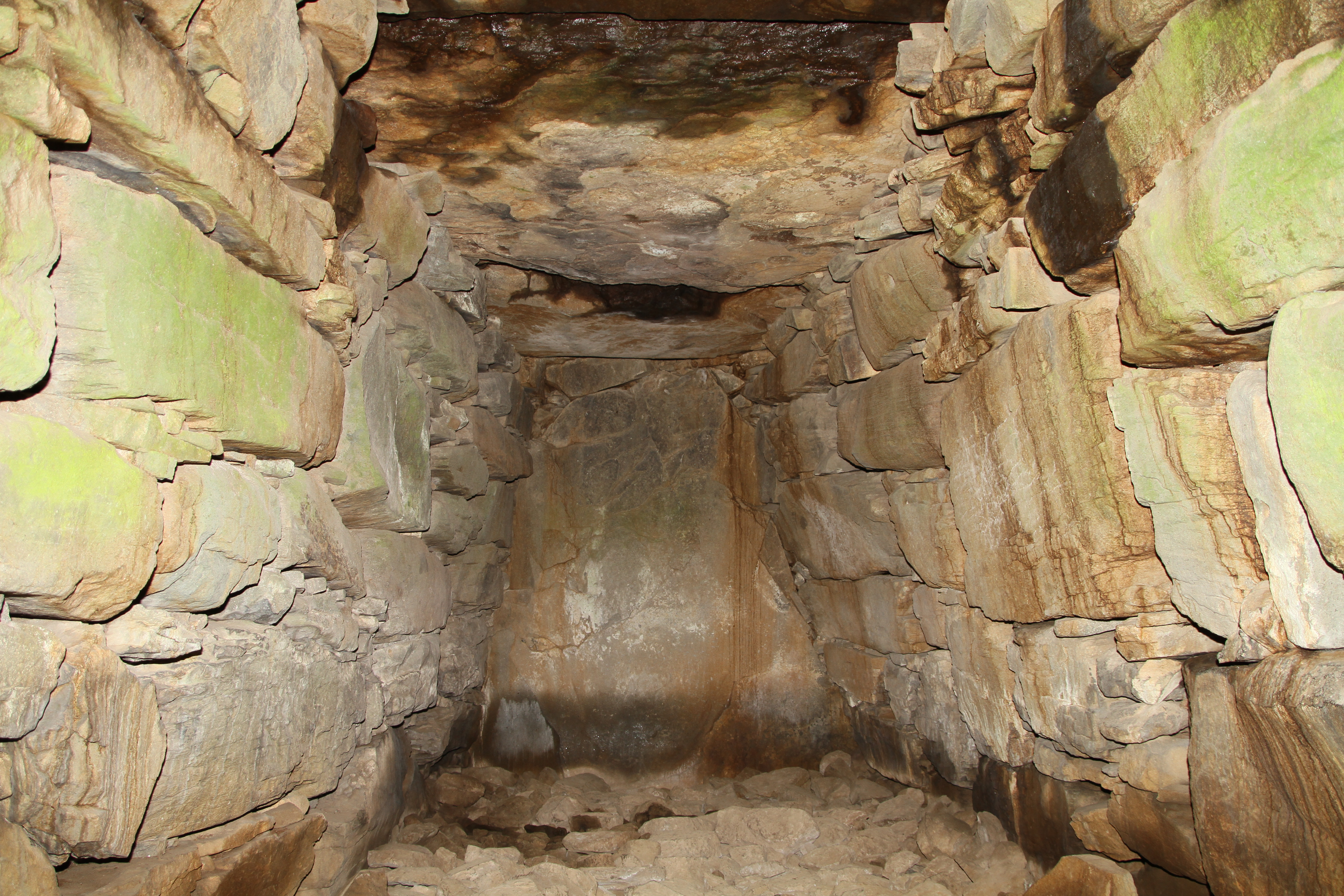
Burial chamber of Tomb 244

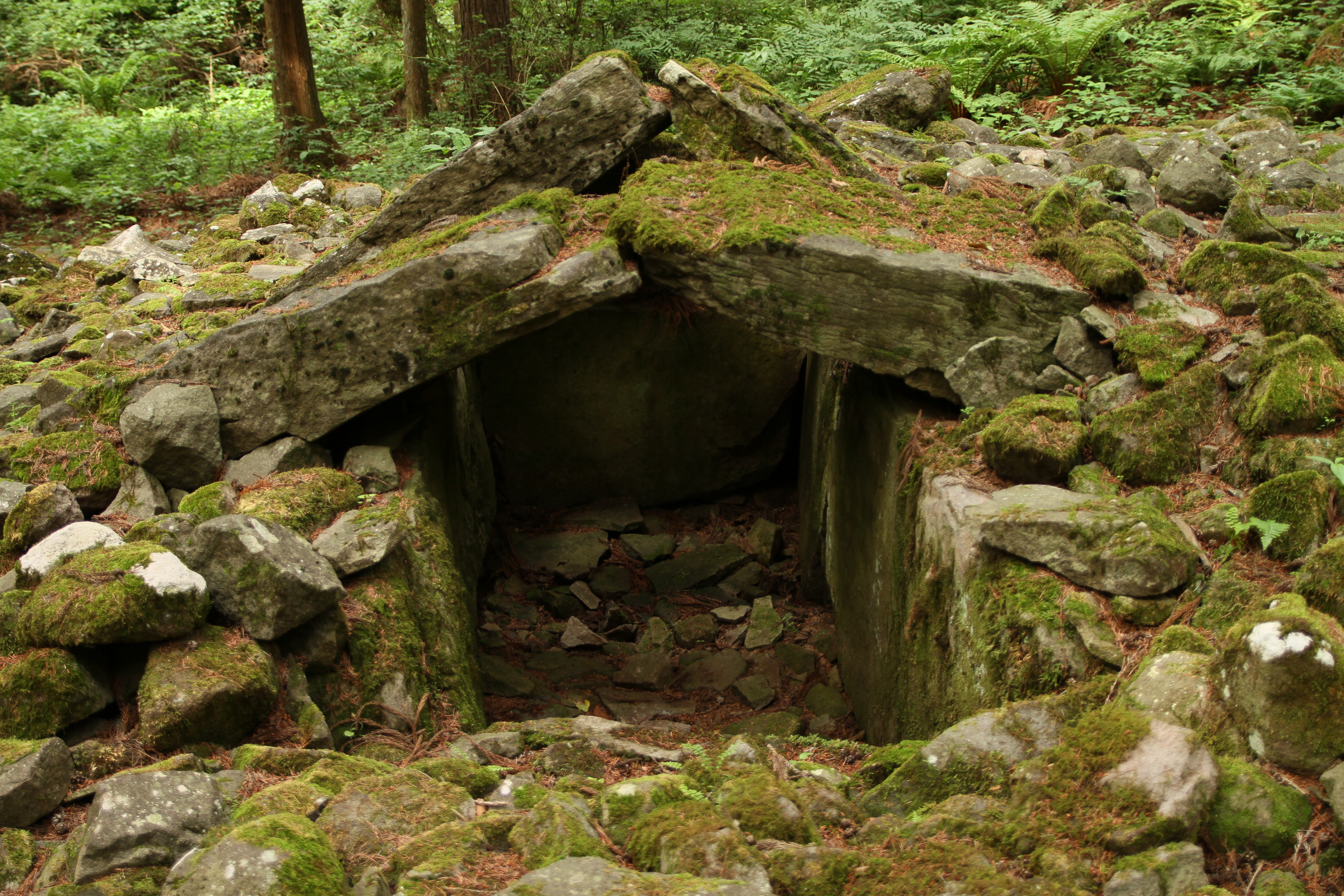
Tomb 168

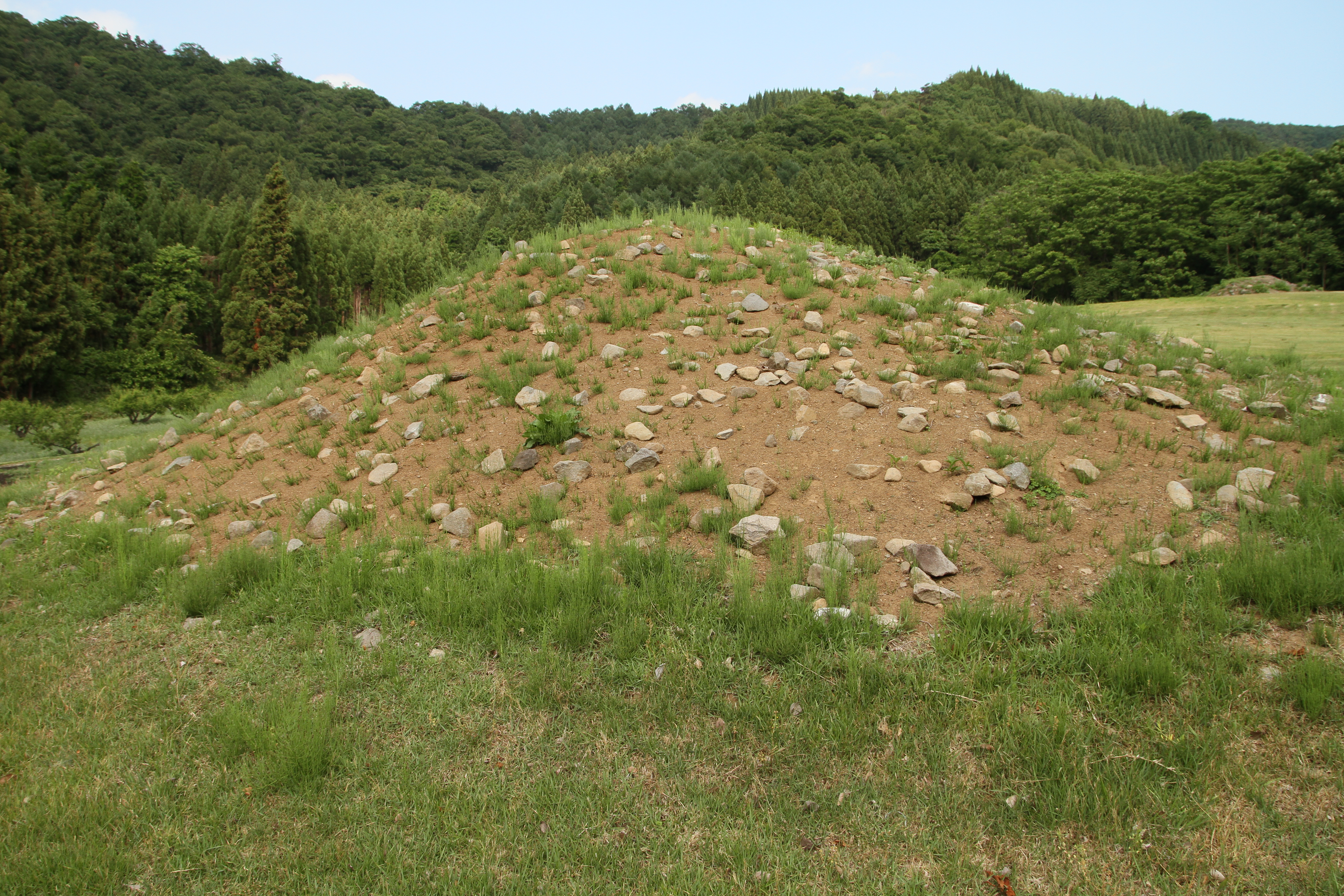
Tomb 238

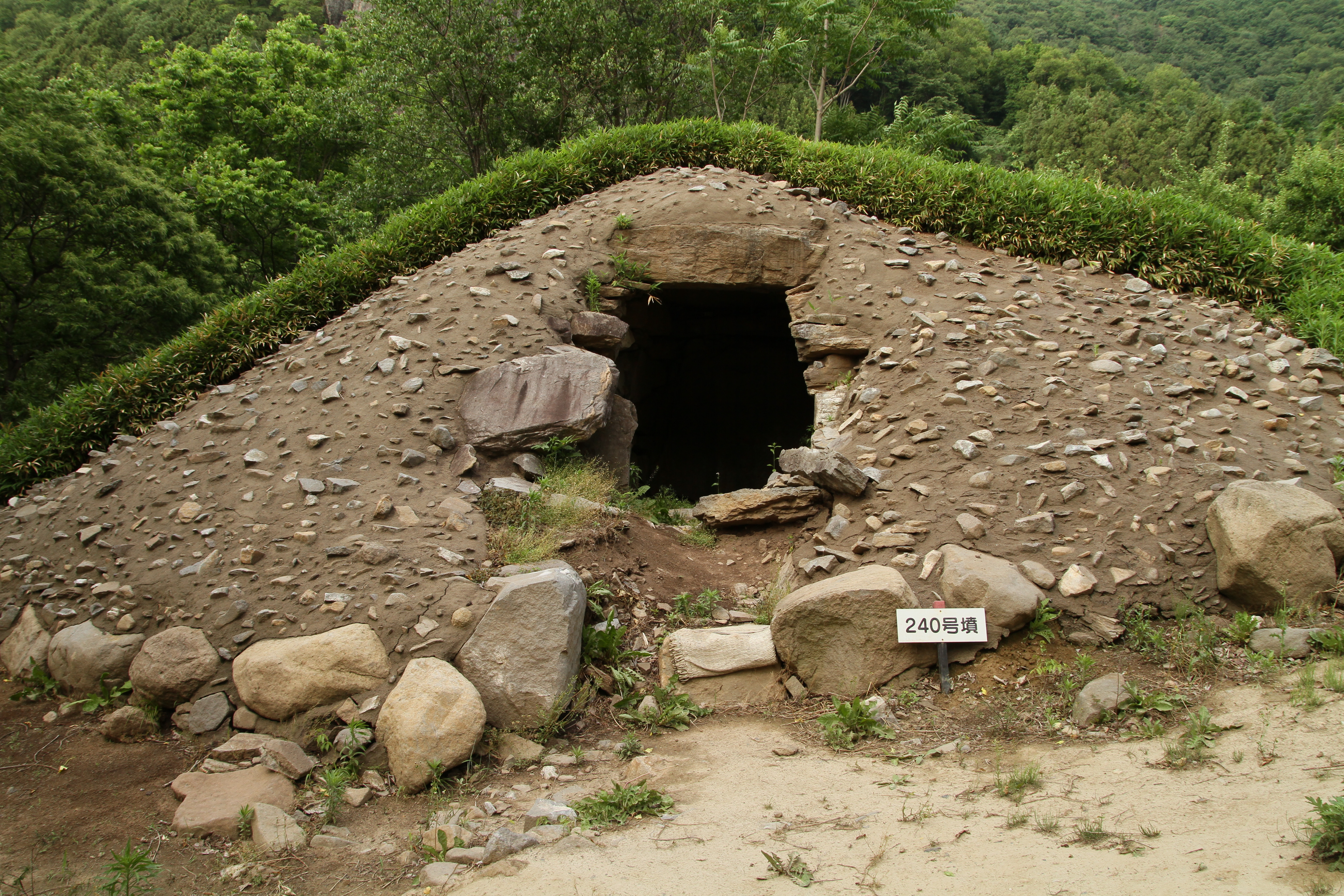
Tomb 240

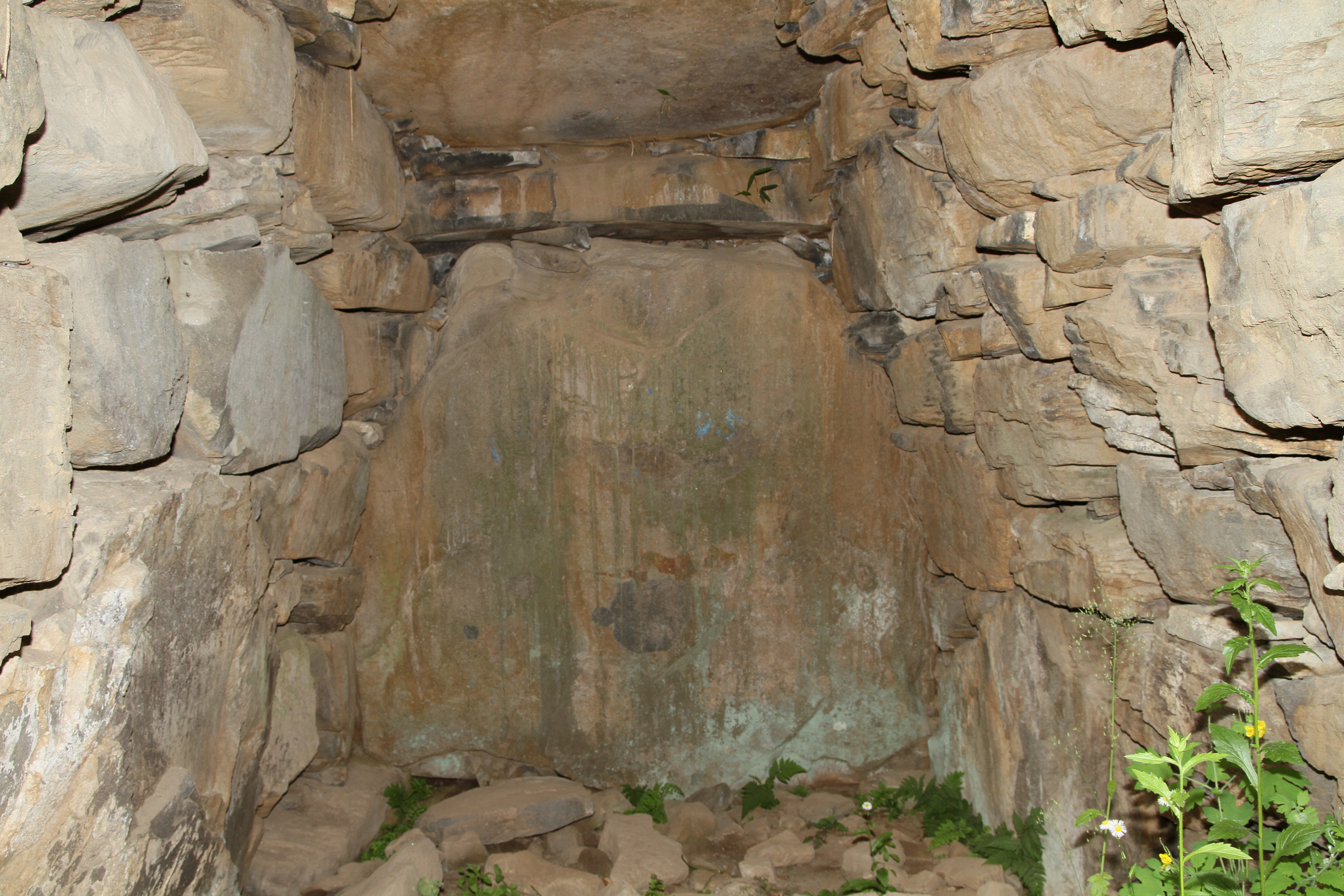
Burial chamber of Tomb 240

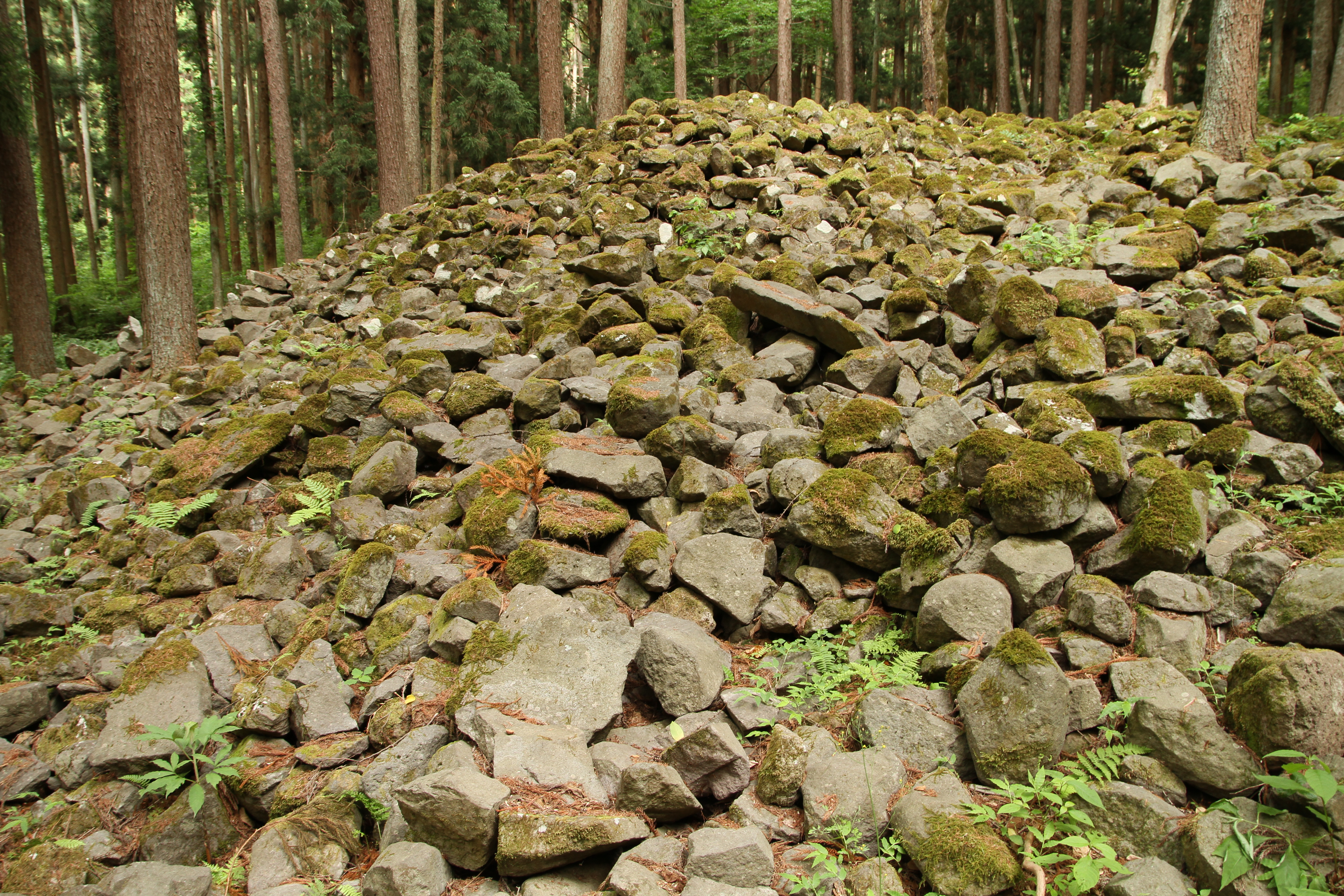
Tomb 276

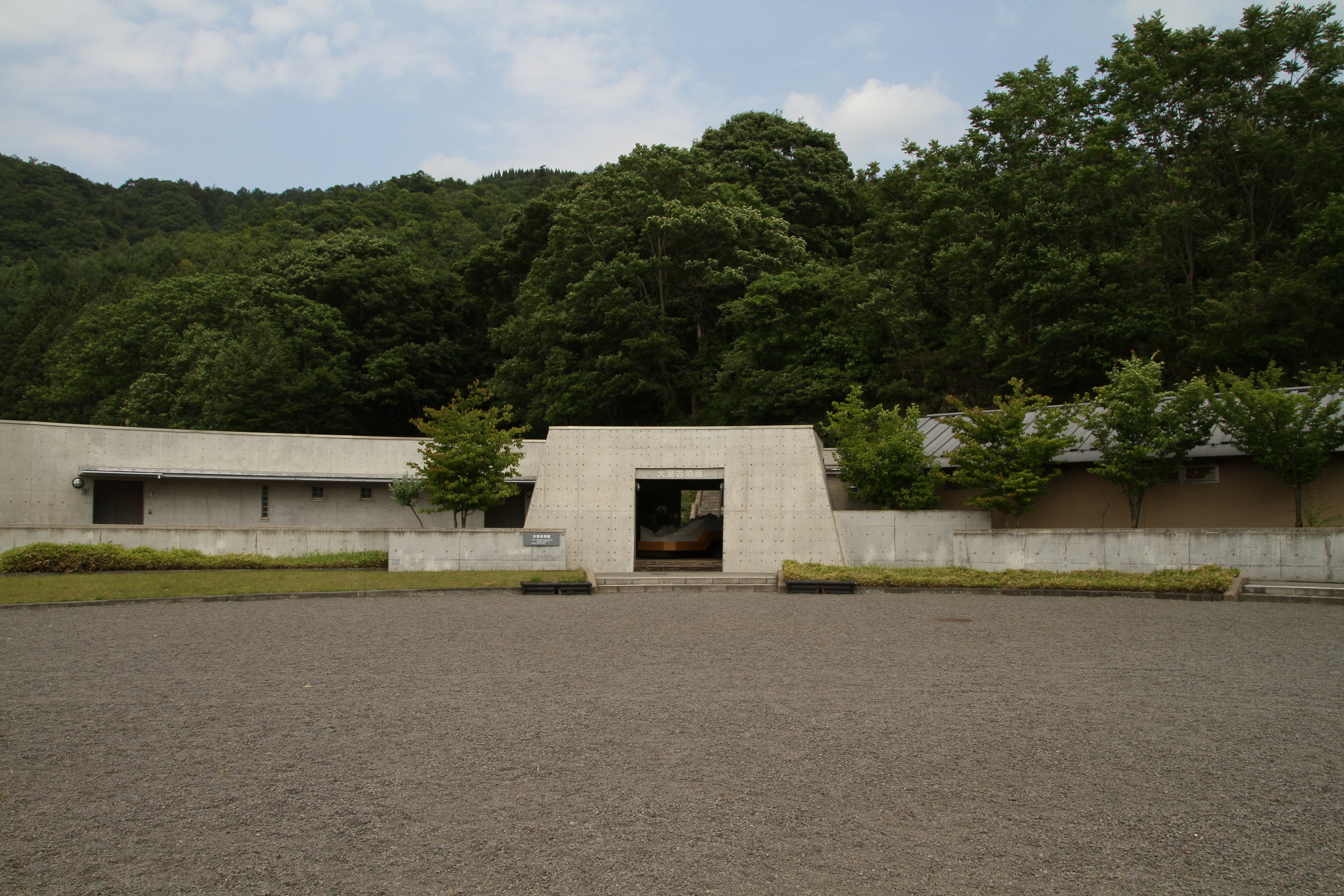
Ōmuro Kofun Museum

== See also ==
- List of Historic Sites of Japan (Nagano)
