= Hanishina Kofun group =

Tumulii (Kofun Period) in Nagano Prefecture, Japan

Hanishina Kofun Group
- 埴科古墳群 (Japanese)
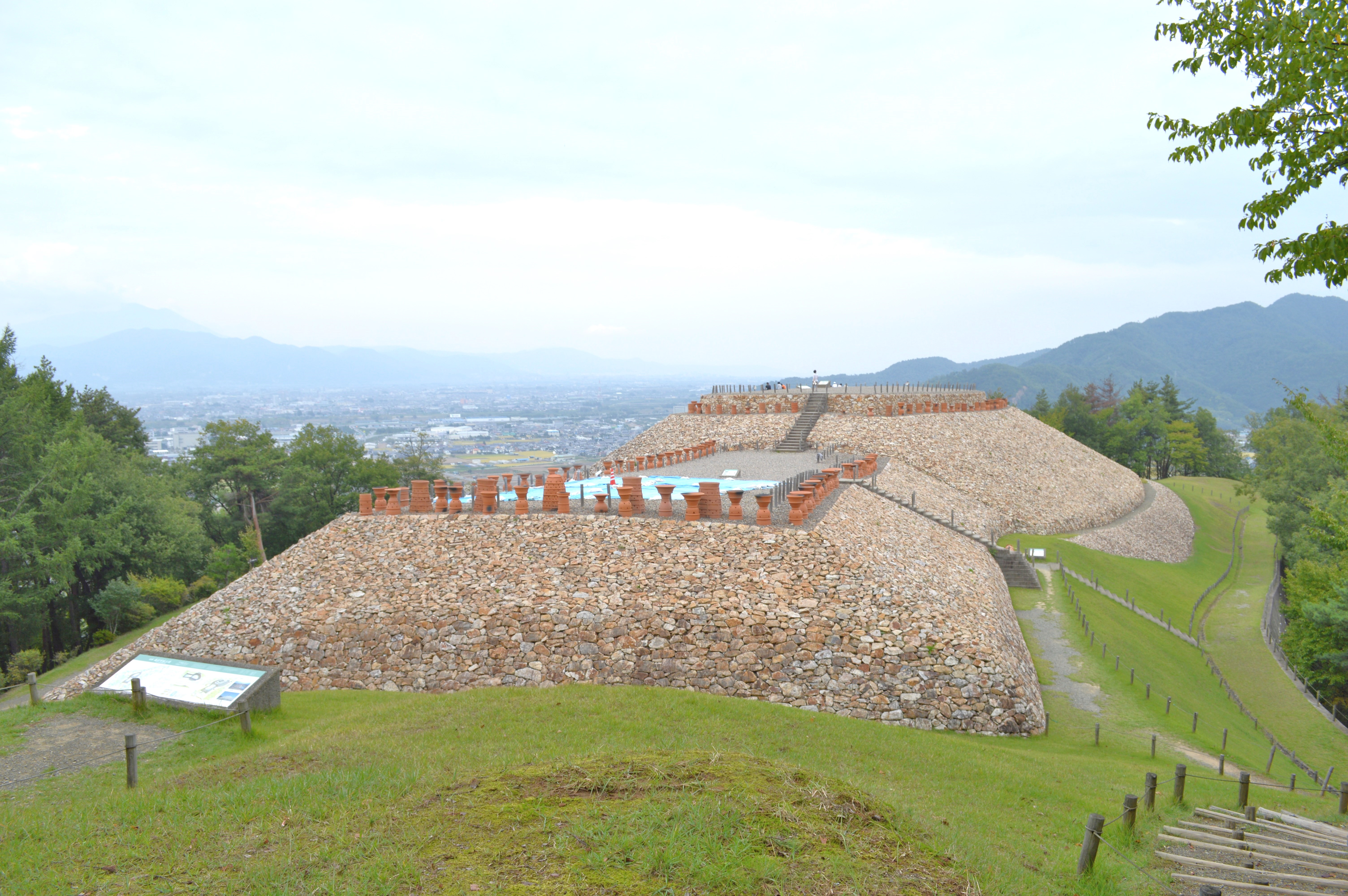
- Mori-Shōgunzuka Kofun

- Hanishina Kofun Group Hanishina Kofun group (Japan)
- 36°31′53″N 138°08′16″E
- Type: Kofun
- Periods: Kofun period
- Location: Chikuma and Nagano, Japan
- Region: Chūbu region

History
- Built: 4th to 6th century AD

Site notes
- Public access: yes (park and museum)

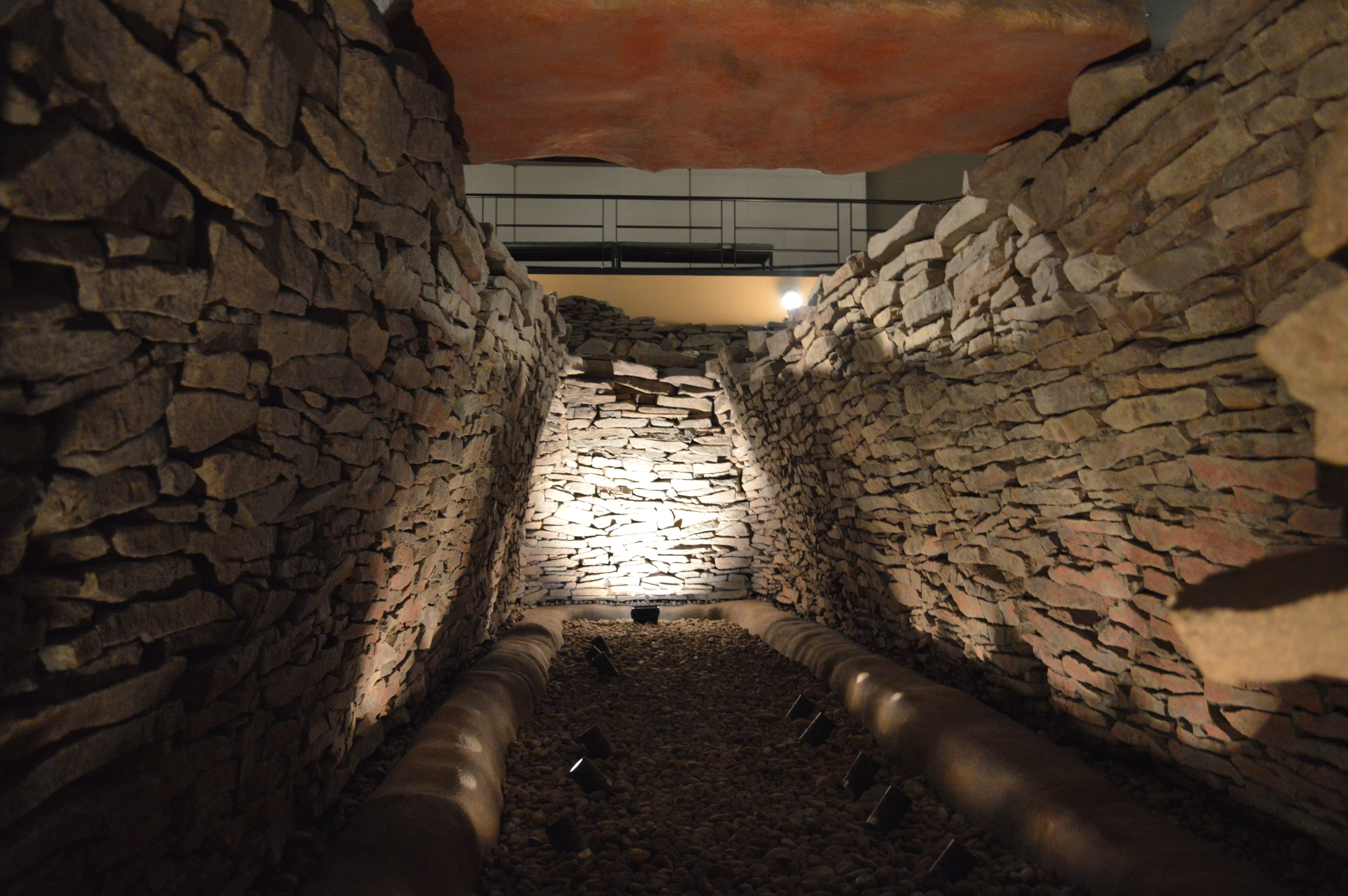
inside the Mori-Shōgunzuka Kofun

The Hanishina Kofun Group (埴科古墳群, Hanishina Kofun gun) is an archaeological site containing three keyhole-shaped burial tumulii from the Kofun period located in what is now part of the cities of Chikuma and Nagano, Nagano Prefecture, in the Chūbu region of Japan. The site was designated a National Historic Site of Japan in 1971. The site includes the Mori-Shōgunzuka Kofun (森将軍塚古墳), Ariakeyama-Shōgunzuka Kofun (有明山将軍塚古墳), Kurashina-Shōgunzuka Kofun (倉科将軍塚古墳), and Doguchi-Shōgunzuka Kofun (土口将軍塚古墳). In addition to the four large tombs which have National Historic Site protection, the surrounding area has many smaller kofun dating from the late fourth to early sixth centuries indicating that this was a center for the pre-Yamato Shinano kingdom. At the base of the hill containing the Mori Shōgunzuka Kofun is the Shinano no Sato Historic Park (科野の里歴史公園, Shinano-no-sato rikishi Kōen) an archaeological park containing faux reconstructions of pit dwellings and raised floor dwellings. It is about 25 minutes on foot from Yashiro Station on the Shinano Railway.

== Mori-Shōgunzuka Kofun ==
The Mori-Shōgunzuka Kofun is located on a ridge of Mount Ariake at an elevation of 490 meters on the right bank of the Chikuma River, which flows through the southern part of the Nagano Basin in what is now part of Chikuma city. It is the largest zenpō-kōen-fun (前方後円墳) (which is shaped like a keyhole, having one square end and one circular end, when viewed from above) in Nagano Prefecture with a total length of over 100 meters. However, it is not bilaterally symmetrical due to being built on a curved ridge with a height of 130–140 meters, and the posterior circular portion is nearly elliptical. The tumulus was once covered fukiishi stones, and had many cylindrical haniwa. The anterior portion has a length of 40 meters and width of approximately 30 meters, with a height of four meters. The posterior circle has a diameter of 45 meters and height of four meters. From the style, it was constructed at the end of the fourth century AD, and is assumed to be the tomb of a local king prior to the establishment of Shinano Province.

The mound contains a double stone walled burial chamber, 7.6 meters wide, with a height of 2.3 meters. This is the largest burial chamber in eastern Japan, but the tomb was robbed in antiquity. Remaining grave goods include broken bronze mirrors indicating a connection with the imperial dynasty and numerous pottery shards which also indicate a connection with the Kansai region. Other artifacts included swords, spears, iron agricultural implements, jade jewelry and other items. On the outside periphery of the tomb were over 13 smaller circular-type (empun (円墳)) kofun and over 76 smaller graves from the latter half of the fifth century to the end of the sixth century. The kofun was extensively reconstructed from 1981 to 1992 to restore to what archaeologists consider to be its original appearance, complete with fukiishi and haniwa. The interior is open to the public, and many of the artifacts discovered are on display at the Nagano History Museum (長野県立歴史館, Nagano-kenritsu Rekishi-kan) located at site.

== Ariakiyama Shōgunzuka Kofun ==
The Ariakeyama-Shōgunzuka Kofun is located on the same ridge as the Mori-Shōgunzuka Kofun, but was much smaller, with a length of 37 meters. It dated from the end of the fifth century to the early sixth century, and has also been robbed in antiquity. Some small bronze mirrors, pottery shards and beads have been found. It was backfilled after a complete excavation survey in 1999, and no trace of it remains today.

== Kurashina Shōgunzuka Kofun ==
The Kurashina-Shōgunzuka Kofun is the third largest kofun in Nagano Prefecture, with a length of 83 meters. It has a vertical pit-type burial chamber in the posterior circular portion and a box-type sarcophagus in the anterior rectangular portion. Although it was robbed in antiquity, a fragment of a triangular plate of leather-bound armor was found in the ruins of the burial chamber, indicating that it was built later than the Mori-Shōgunzuka Kofun and the Ariakeyama-Shōgunzuka Kofun in the first half of the 5th century. It was partially demolished to provide building materials for the early Washio Castle in the Muromachi period. It is not open to the public.

== Doguchi Shōgunzuka Kofun ==
The Doguchi-Shōgunzuka Kofun is contemporary with the Kurashina-Shōgunzuka Kofun, dating from the mid-Kofun period. It has a length of 67.7 meters, and is located on the border between the cities of Nagano and Chikuma. It was excavated from 1982 to 1986 and was found to also have two burial chambers, which were side-by-side in the posterior circular portion. It had been robbed in antiquity, but fragments of armor, pottery and glass beads were found.

== Gallery ==
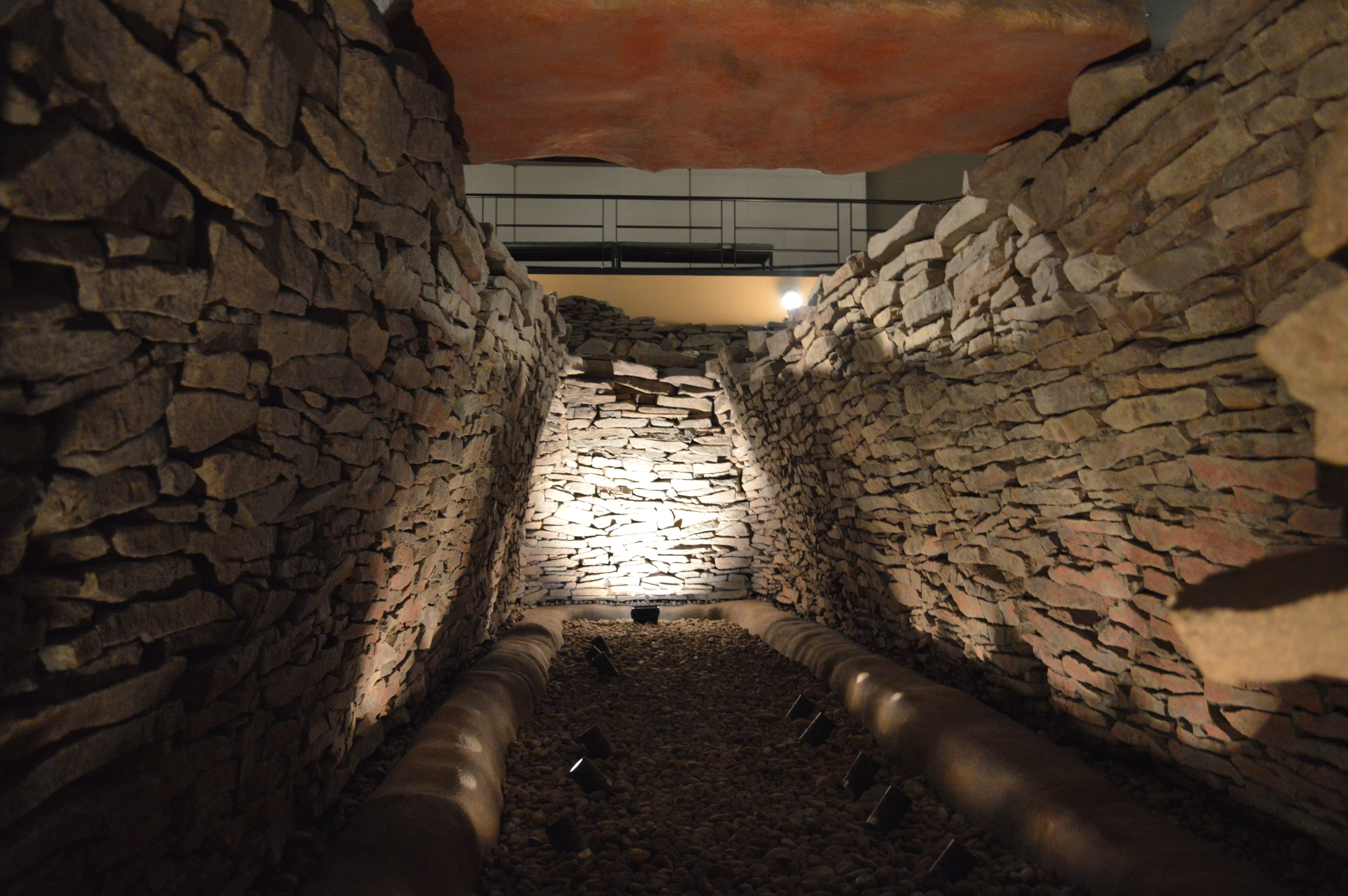
Mori-Shōgunzuka Kofun Burial Chamber reconstruction

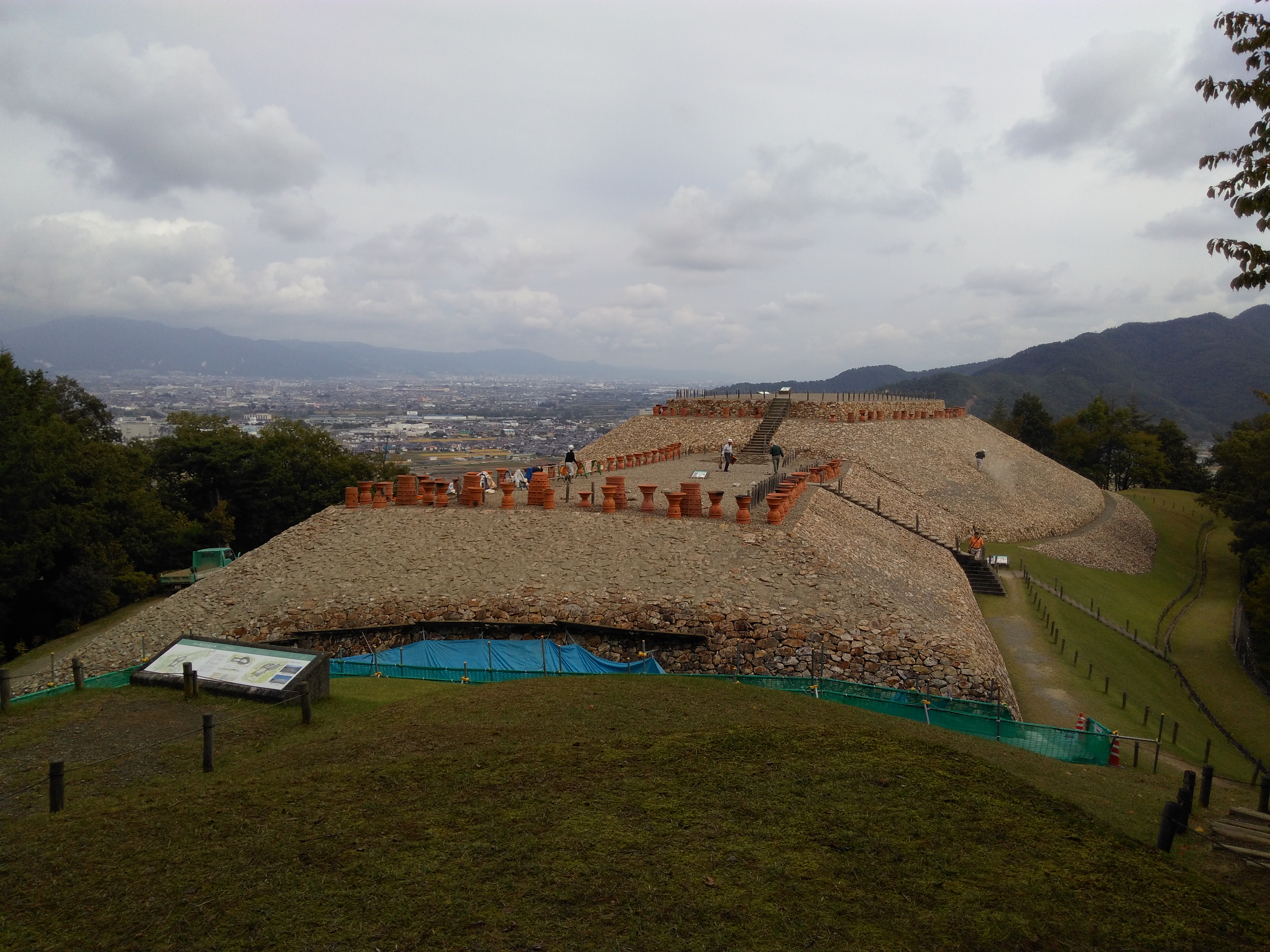
Mori-Shōgunzuka Kofun with haniwa

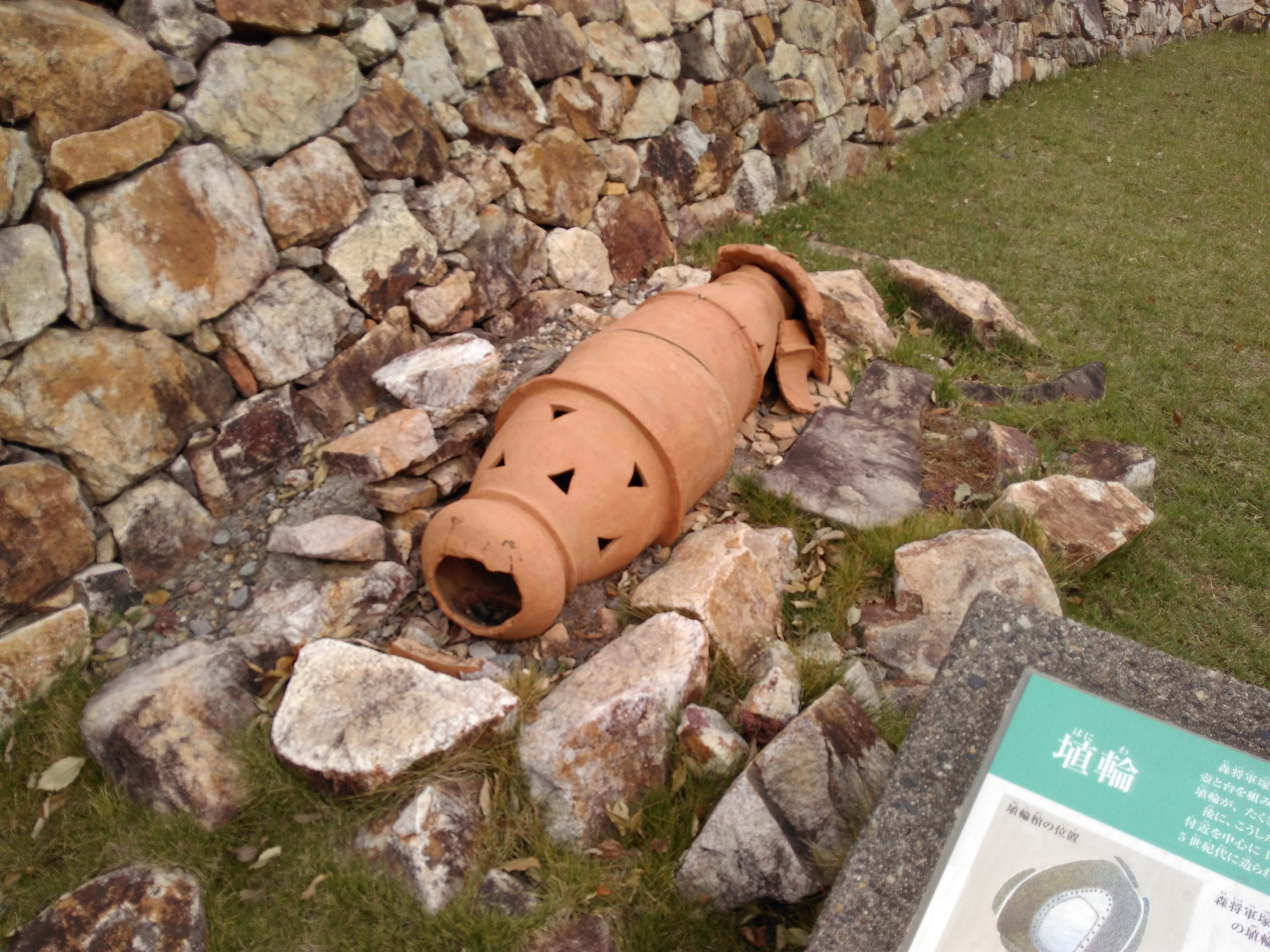
Haniwa

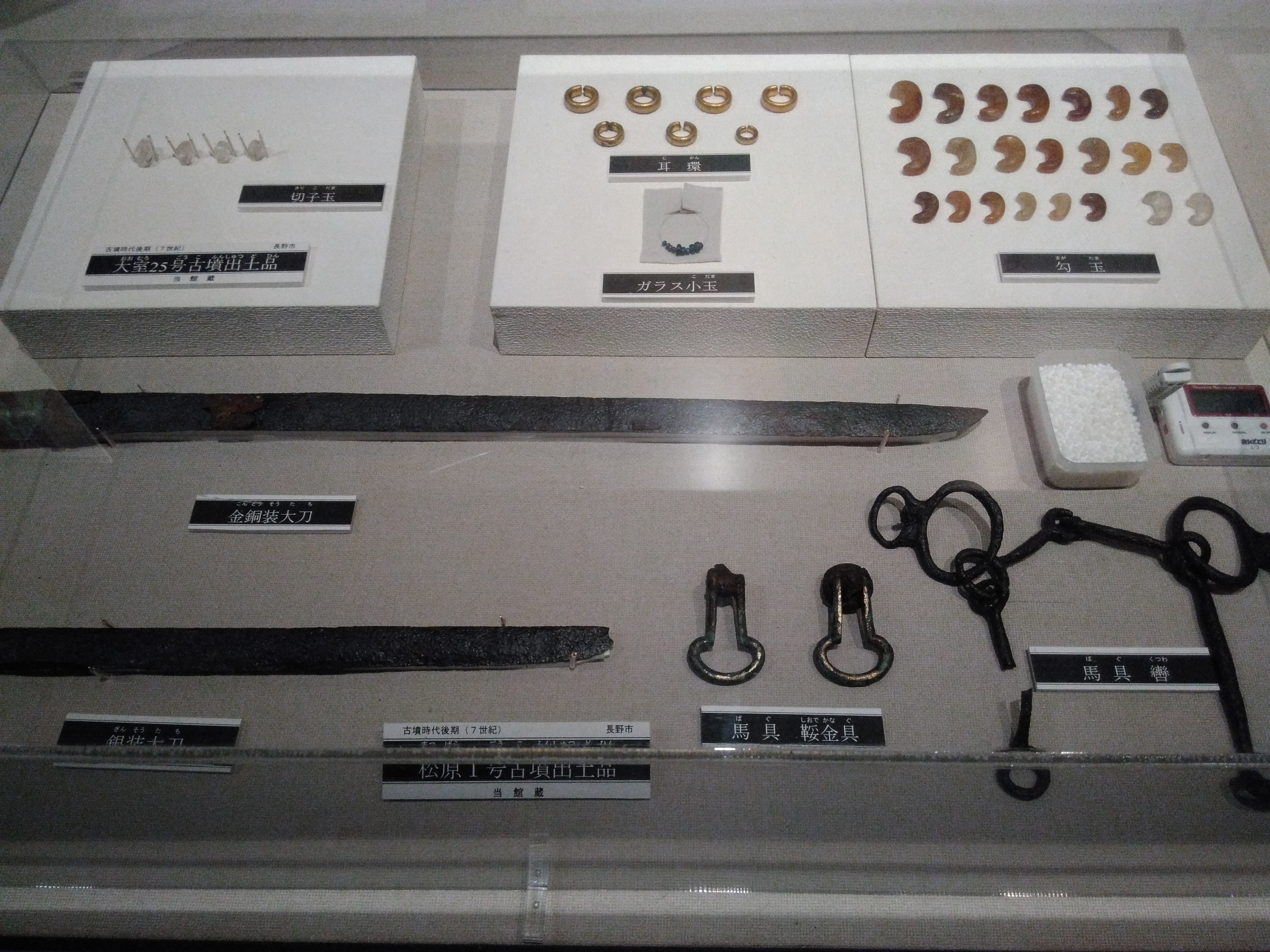
Grave goods

== See also ==
- List of Historic Sites of Japan (Nagano)
