= Iwabitsu Castle =

- 岩櫃城
- Higashiagatsuma, Gunma Prefecture, Japan
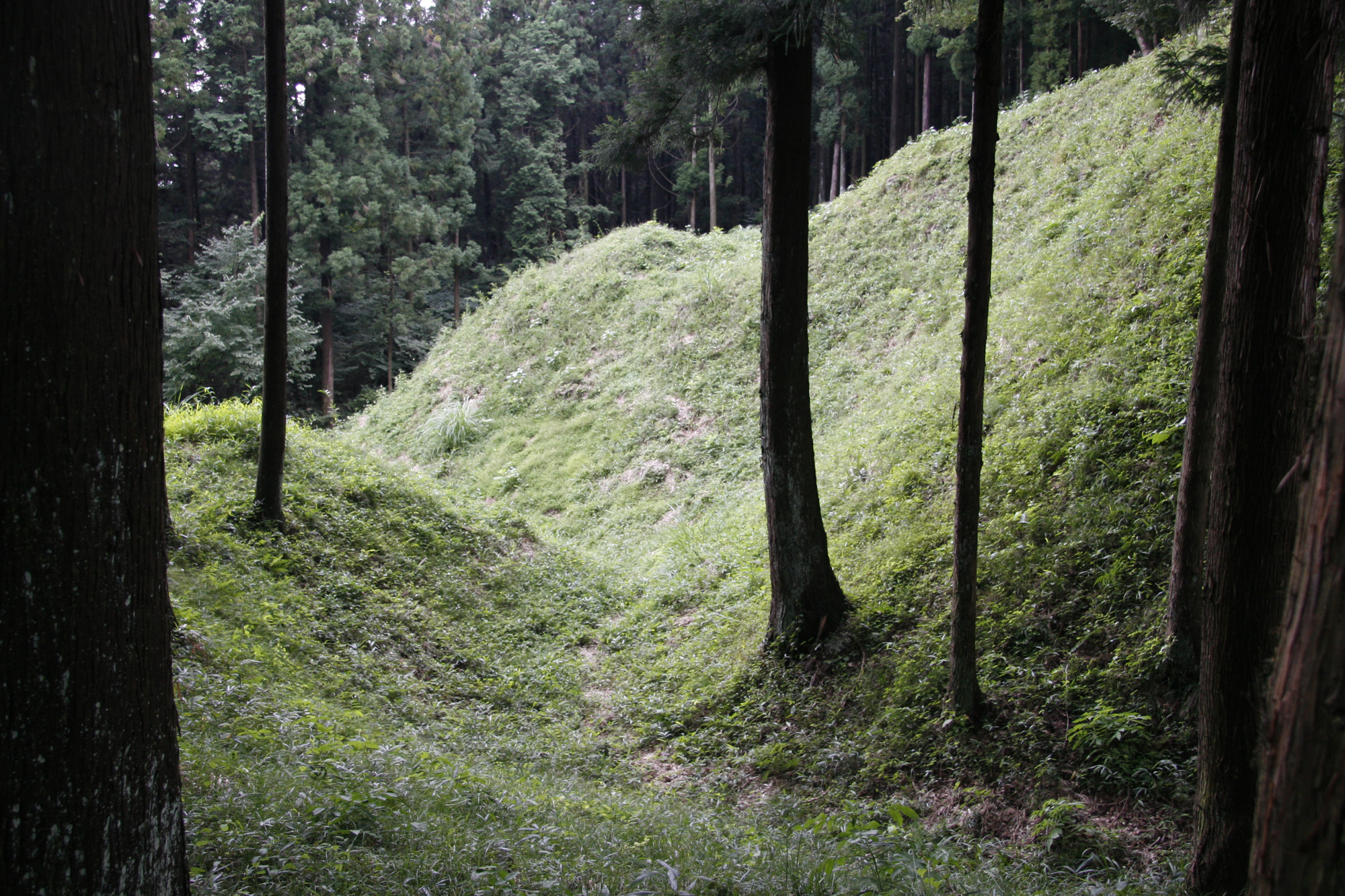
- Mounds around the foundation of Iwabitsu Castle

Site information
- Type: yamashiro-style Japanese castle
- Condition: ruins

Location
- Morioka Castle Iwabitsu Castle (Japan)
- Coordinates: 36°33′33.1″N 138°48′17.3″E

Site history
- Built: c.13th century
- Built by: Agatsuma clan
- Demolished: 1614

Garrison information
- Past commanders: Sanada Yukitaka, Sanada Masayuki

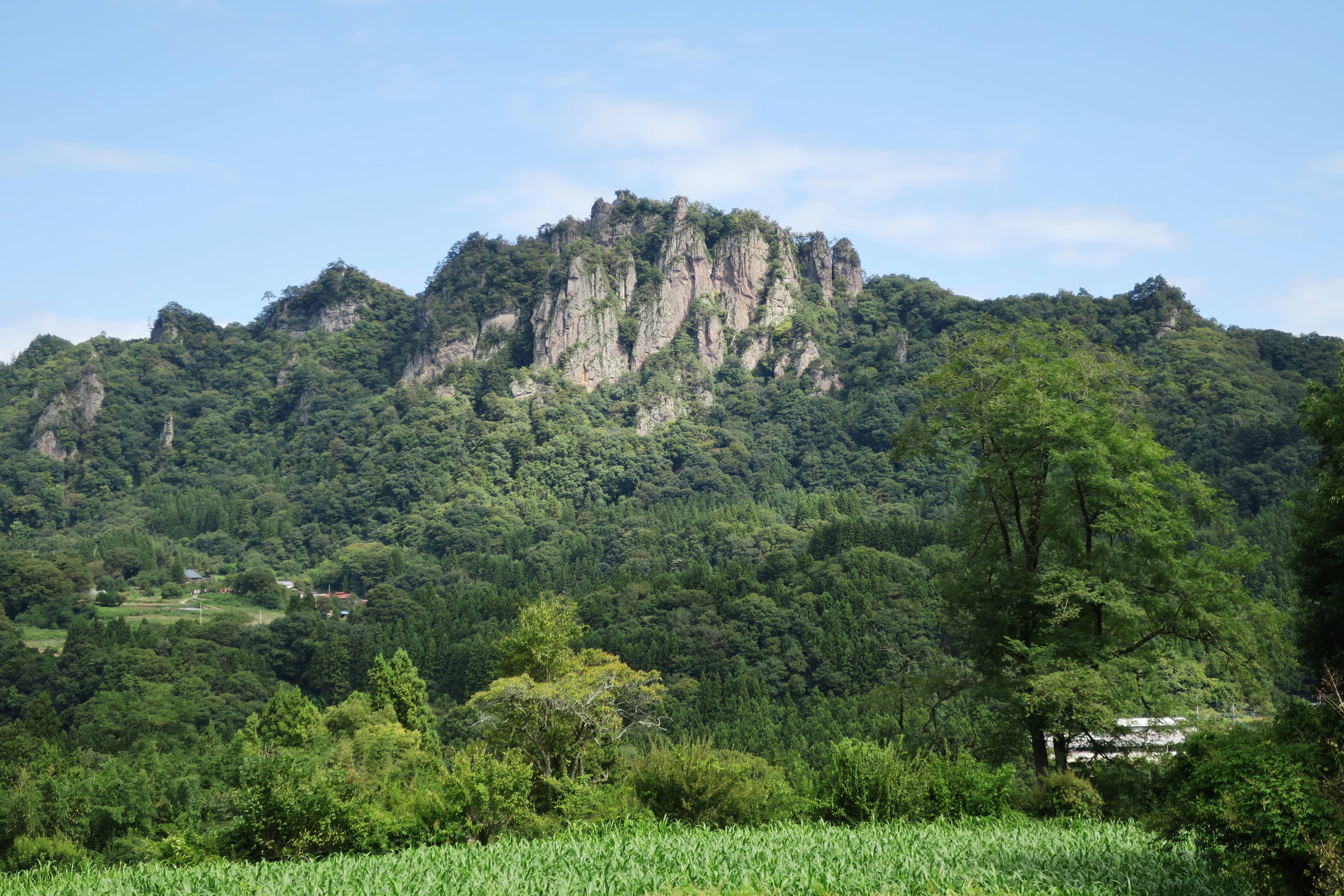
Mount Iwabitsu (Iwabitsu Castle)

Iwabitsu Castle (岩櫃城, Iwabitsu-jō) is a "yamashiro"-style (castle located on Mount Iwabitsu in Higashiagatsuma, Gunma Prefecture, Japan. The ruins have been protected by the central government as a National Historic Site since 2019.

== Overview ==
Iwabitsu Castle is located in northwestern Gunma Prefecture in the middle of a long valley created by the Agatsuma River (a tributary of the Tone River). This valley was the route of the Shinshu Kaidō, a road which led from Takasaki to Shinano Province via the Torii Pass, and the castle thus controlled a strategic point on this highway.

== History ==
The origins of the Iwabitsu Castle are uncertain, but it is believed to have been built by the local Agatsuma clan sometime in the 13th century. During the Muromachi period, it was held by the Saitō clan, another local warlord. However, in the early Sengoku period, it was captured by Sanada Yukitaka, who had expanded from Shinano Province into northern Kōzuke Province with the backing of his overlord, Takeda Shingen. The Saitō clan had turned to Uesugi Kenshin of Echigo Province for assistance, but due to the distance from Echigo and the stratagems employed by the Sanada, the castle fell in 1563.

Sanada Masayuki used Iwabitsu Castle as his base to continue his expansion into northern Kōzuke, capturing Numata Castle in 1579. He also rebuilt the Iwabitsu jōkamachi into a fortified shukuba by surrounding the entire town with a series of forts and gates, similar to the layout which he later employed when designing the new stronghold for the Takeda clan at Shinpu Castle as few years later. After the fall of the Takeda clan in 1582, Sanada Masayuki had planned to provide refuge for Takeda Katsuyori at Iwabitsu Castle, but Katsuyori was unable to reach it due to treachery by some of his remaining retainers and committed seppuku.

The famed samurai Karasawa Genba was an officer at the castle.

Following the establishment of a stable regime under Toyotomi Hideyoshi, Iwabitsu and Numata were awarded to Sanada Nobuyuki, while his father Masayuki retained Ueda Castle. Following the death of Toyotomi Hideyoshi, Sanada Masayuki remained loyal to Toyotomi Hideyori and his regent Ishida Mitsunari, whereas Sanada Nobuyuki, sided with Tokugawa Ieyasu. With the victory by Tokugawa forces at the Battle of Sekigahara in 1600, Sanada Nobuyuki was confirmed in his holdings in northern Kōzuke, but due to the Tokugawa shogunate’s rule of “one domain – one castle” in 1615, Iwabitsu Castle was abolished. The jōkamachi survived as post station on the highway, but was relocated closer to the Agatsuma River.

At present, nothing survives of the original castle. The entrance to the site is approximately 30 minutes on foot from Gunma-Haramachi Station on the JR East Agatsuma Line, followed by another 30 minute hike up the side of the mountain to reach the location of the inner bailey.

Iwabitsu Castle was listed as one of the Continued Top 100 Japanese Castles in 2017.

== See also ==
- List of Historic Sites of Japan (Gunma)

== Literature ==
- Schmorleitz, Morton S. (1974). Castles in Japan. Tokyo: Charles E. Tuttle Co. pp. 144–145. ISBN 0-8048-1102-4.
- Motoo, Hinago (1986). Japanese Castles. Tokyo: Kodansha. p. 200 pages. ISBN 0-87011-766-1.
- Mitchelhill, Jennifer (2004). Castles of the Samurai: Power and Beauty. Tokyo: Kodansha. p. 112 pages. ISBN 4-7700-2954-3.
- Turnbull, Stephen (2003). Japanese Castles 1540-1640. Osprey Publishing. p. 64 pages. ISBN 1-84176-429-9.
