= Numata (disambiguation) =

Numata is a city in Gunma Prefecture, Japan.

Numata may also refer to:

== Places ==
- Numata, Hokkaido, a town in Sorachi Subprefecture, Hokkaido, Japan
- Numata Domain, a former domain of Japan
- Numata Castle, a castle in Numata, Gunma
- Numata Station, a railway station in Numata, Gunma

== Other uses ==
- Numata (surname), a Japanese surname
- Numata (moth), a moth genus
