= Karasawa Genba =

Karasawa Genba (唐沢 玄蕃) was a samurai of the Sengoku period, in the 16th century of the common era, who served as an important retainer of the Sanada clan.

Genba was allegedly born in Sawatari, Shinano province, and was originally an officer of Iwabitsu Castle.

Sanada Masayuki and Sanada Yukitaka were very good at persuading their opponents to defect. Their great talent in this field led them to win victories over many castles when infiltrated. Genba was one of those former enemies persuaded to defect, and thereafter went on to serve under the Sanada.

As a Sanada retainer, Genba snuck into Shiritaka Castle with his colleagues and burned it. He participated in the Battle of Nagashino in 1575. When Takeda, the lord of Sanada, lost that battle, Genba escaped and returned to his land.

In popular culture, Genba is frequently depicted as a ninja.
