= Numata Domain =

Feudal domain in Edo period Japan

Numata Domain 沼田藩
- under Tokugawa shogunate Japan
- 1656–1871
- Capital: Numata Castle
  - Type: Daimyō
- Historical era: Edo period
  - Established: 1656
  - Disestablished: 1871
- Today part of: part of Gunma Prefecture

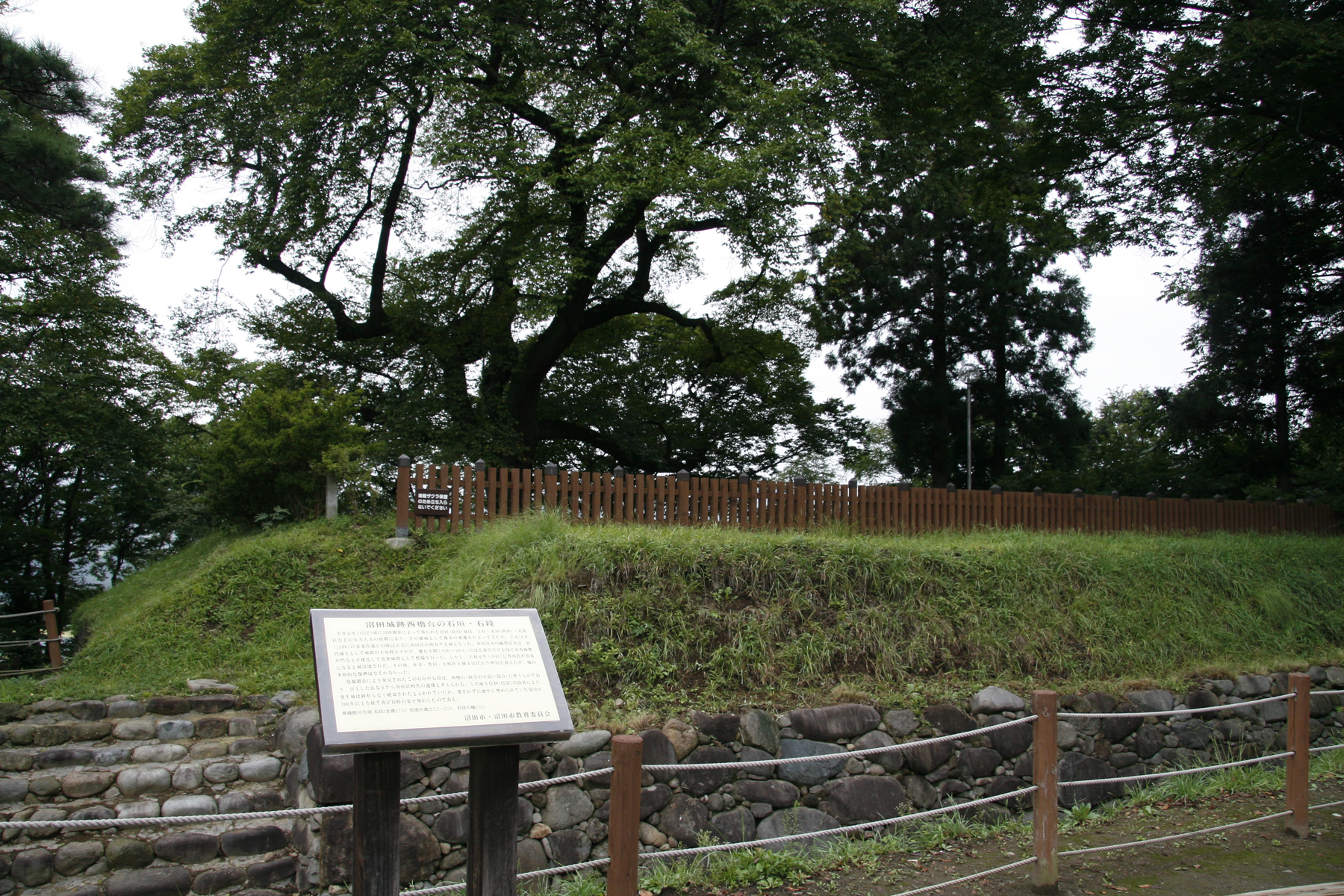
Ruins of Numata Castle, administrative center of Numata Domain

Numata Domain (沼田藩, Numata-han) was a feudal domain under the Tokugawa shogunate of Edo period Japan, located in Kōzuke Province (modern-day Gunma Prefecture), Japan. It was centered on Numata Castle in what is now the city of Numata, Gunma.

== History ==
Following the Battle of Odawara in 1590, Toyotomi Hideyoshi awarded a 27,000 koku area of Numata to Sanada Masayuki. However, Yukimasa was based at Ueda Castle in Shinano Province, and thus entrusted the lands to his son, Sanada Nobuyuki. In the subsequent conflict between the Toyotomi and Tokugawa, the Sanada clan hedged its bets with Sanada Nobuyuki siding with Tokugawa Ieyasu and fighting against his brother, Sanada Yukimura at the Battle of Sekigahara. As a reward for his services, Sanada Nobuyuki was subsequently confirmed by the Tokugawa shogunate in 1600 as daimyō over the combined Ueda and Numata territories and his revenues were increased to 95,000 koku. In 1616, Nobuyuki relocated from Numata to Ueda, entrusting Numata to his son, Sanada Nobuyoshi, but Numata was not officially recognized as a separate domain until 1656. The final Sanada daimyō, Sanada Nobutoshi, profited tremendously by under-representing his income to the shogunate and with the lumber trade. This enabled him to rebuild Numata Castle on a large scale with a 5-story donjon, and rebuilt the clan's residences in Edo on a large scale. The financial irregularities were eventually discovered, and the shogunate seized the domain in 1681.

In 1703, the domain was revived when a branch of the Honda clan was transferred from Shimosa Province, and ruled for three generations until they were transferred to Tanaka Domain in Suruga Province in 1730. In 1732, a branch of the Kuroda clan was transferred from Hitachi Province to Numata, and ruled over two generations to 1742. The Kuroda clan was replaced by Toki Yoritoshi in 1742, formerly from Tanaka Domain and a former rōjū, and the Toki clan would continue to rule Numata to the Meiji Restoration. During the Boshin War, the final daimyō, Toki Yorioki sided with the imperial forces and participated in the Battle of Aizu.

After the end of the conflict, with the abolition of the han system in July 1871, Numata Domain became "Numata Prefecture", which later became part of Gunma Prefecture.

The domain had a population of 47,177 people in 13,715 households per a census in 1681.

== Holdings at the end of the Edo period ==
As with most domains in the han system, Numata Domain consisted of several discontinuous territories calculated to provide the assigned kokudaka, based on periodic cadastral surveys and projected agricultural yields.

- Kōzuke Province
  - 5 villages in Gunma District
  - 50 villages in Tone District
- Kawachi Province
  - 5 villages in Wakae District
  - 5 villages in Shiki District
- Mimasaka Province
  - 6 villages in Shōboku District
  - 51 villages in Aida District
  - 3 villages in Shōnan District

== List of rulers (before become domain) ==
- Sanada Yukiyoshi
- Sanada Yukitaka (r.?–1574)
- Sanada Nobutsuna (r.1574–1575)
- Sanada Masayuki (r.1575–1590)
- Hojo Ujinao (r.1590–1590)
- Sanada Masayuki (r.1590–1600)
- Sanada Nobuyuki (r.1600–1616)
- Sanada Nobuyoshi (r.1616–1634)
- Sanada Nobumasa (r.1634–1656)

== List of daimyō ==
#	Name	Tenure	Courtesy title	Court Rank	kokudaka
Sanada clan (tozama) 1656–1681
1	Sanada Nobutoshi (真田信利)	1656–1681	Iga-no-kami (伊賀守)	Lower 5th (従五位下)	30,000 koku
	tenryō	1681–1703			
Honda clan (fudai) 1703–1730
1	Honda Masanaga (本多正永)	1703–1711	Hōki-no-kami (伯耆守); Jijū (侍従)	Lower 4th (従四位下)	20,000->40,000 koku
2	Honda Masatake (本多正武)	1711–1721	Tōtōmi-no-kami (遠江守)	Lower 5th (従五位下)	40,000 koku
3	Honda Masanori (本多正矩)	1721–1730	Buzen-no-kami (豊前守)	Lower 5th (従五位下)	40,000koku
Kuroda clan (fudai) 1732–1742
1	Kuroda Naokuni (黒田直邦)	1732–1735	Buzen-no-kami (豊前守)；Jijū(侍従)	Lower 4th (従四位下)	30,000 koku
2	Kuroda Naozumi (黒田直純)	1735–1742	Yamato-no-kami (大和守)	Lower 5th (従五位下)	30,000 koku
Toki clan (fudai) 1742–1871
1	Toki Yoritoshi (土岐頼稔)	1742–1744	Tango-no-kami (丹後守); Jijū(侍従)	Lower 4th (従四位下)	35,000 koku
2	Toki Yorioki (土岐頼煕)	1744–1755	Iyo-no-kami (伊予守)	Lower 5th (従五位下)	35,000 koku
3	Toki Tadatsune (土岐定経)	1755–1782	Mino-no-kami (美濃守)	Lower 4th (従四位下)	35,000 koku
4	Toki Yorihiro (土岐頼寛)	1782–1782	Iyo-no-kami (伊予守)	Lower 5th (従五位下)	35,000 koku
5	Toki Yoriyoshi (土岐定吉)	1782–1786	Mino-no-kami (美濃守)	Lower 5th (従五位下)	35,000 koku
6	Toki Yoritomi (土岐定富)	1786–1790	-none-	-none-	35,000 koku
7	Toki Yorinobu (土岐頼布)	1790–1813	Yamashiro-no-kami (山城守)	Lower 5th (従五位下)	35,000 koku
8	Toki Yorimitsu (土岐頼潤)	1813–1826	Yamashiro-no-kami (山城守)	Lower 5th (従五位下)	35,000 koku
9	Toki Yorikatsu (土岐頼功)	1826–1843	Yamashiro-no-kami (山城)	Lower 5th (従五位下)	35,000 koku
10	Toki Yoriyasu (土岐頼寧)	1843–1867	Iyo-no-kami (伊予守)	Lower 5th (従五位下)	35,000 koku
11	Toki Yoriyuki (土岐頼之)	1857–1871	Yamashiro-no-kami (山城守)	Lower 5th (従五位下)	35,000 koku
12	Toki Yorioki (土岐頼知)	1867–1871	Hayato-no-kami (隼人正)	Lower 5th (従五位下)	35,000 koku
