= Numata Castle =

Coordinates: 36°38′55.4″N 139°2′20.5″E

Numata Castle 沼田城
- Numata, Gunma Prefecture, Japan
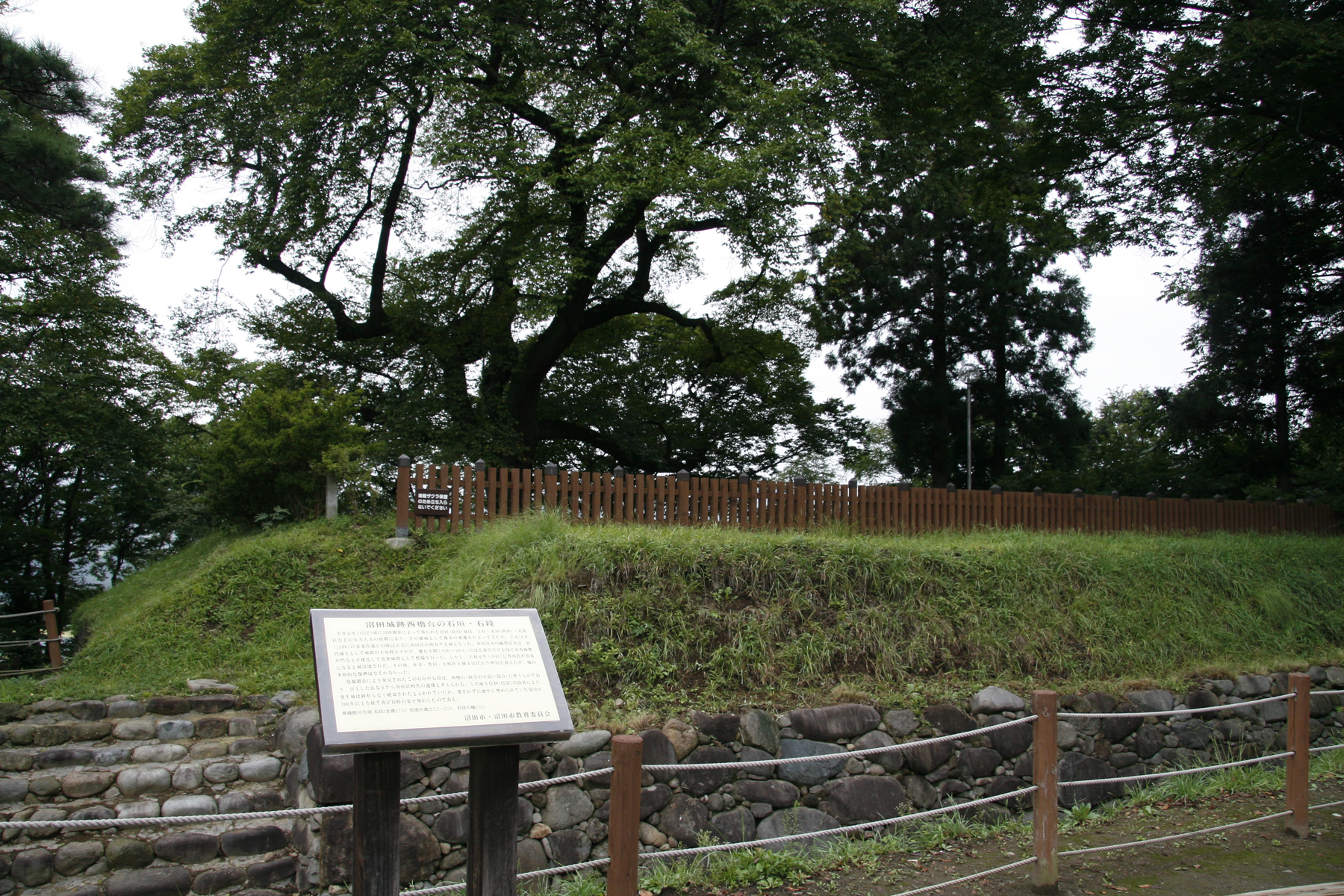
- ruins of Numata Castle

Site information
- Type: hilltop-style Japanese castle
- Open to the public: yes

Location
- Location within Gunma Prefecture Location within Japan

Site history
- Built: 1532 rebuilt 1597, 1703
- Built by: Numata Akiyasu, Sanada Nobuyuki, Honda Masanaga
- In use: Edo period
- Demolished: 1681, 1872

Numata Castle (沼田城, Numata-jō) is a Japanese castle located in Numata, northern Gunma Prefecture, Japan. At the end of the Edo period, Numata Castle was home to the Toki clan, daimyō of Numata Domain, but the castle was ruled by various clans over its history, and is noted as the site of a major battle in the Sengoku period. The castle was also known as "Kurauchi-jō" (倉内城).

== History ==
During the Muromachi period, the area around Numata was controlled by the Numata clan, with a fortification built on this location by Numata Akiyasu in 1532. Sanada Masayuki, a vassal of Takeda Katsuyori captured the castle in 1580, and most of the Numata clan perished in a failed attempt to retake their ancestral home the following year. The area was subsequently contested between the Sanada clan and the Odawara Hōjō clan. In 1589, Toyotomi Hideyoshi attempted to arbitrate the dispute by giving Numata to the Hōjō and awarding nearby Nagurumi Castle to the Sanada. However, the Hōjō castellan Inomata Kuninori was dissatisfied with this arrangement and attacked the Sanada. However, after the defeat of the Hojo at the Battle of Odawara in 1590 the control of Numata was firmly restored to the Sanada.

Sanada Nobuyuki comprehensively rebuilt on a vast scale Numata Castle in 1597, incorporating stone walls and a large five-story donjon and several three-story yagura. Numata became a separate domain from the main Sanada holding at Ueda Castle in 1656. However, in 1681 Sanada Nobutoshi was dispossessed by the Tokugawa shogunate for gross under-representation of his revenues, and the castle of destroyed.

Numata Domain was restored in 1703 and given to Honda Masanaga, who rebuilt Numata Castle on a smaller scale by re-excavating some of the filled-in moats and restoring some of the earthen works, but a new donjon or yagura were never built. The castle then passed into the hands of a junior branch of the Kuroda clan before passing into the hands of the Toki clan in 1742. The Toki resided in a residence built within the third bailey, but the "castle" remained little more than a jin'ya.

In 1912, a former samurai in the service of the Toki clan, Kume Tamenosuke, purchased the castle site, and he donated it to the town of Numata in 1926 for use as a park. The park contains the Ubukata House, an Edo period structure that was once used as a pharmacy in the Numata castle town. The structure is an Important Cultural Property and serves as a local history museum. It also contains a scale model of Numata Castle under the Sanada.

Numata Castle was listed as one of the Continued Top 100 Japanese Castles in 2017.

== Literature ==
- De Lange, William (2021). An Encyclopedia of Japanese Castles. Groningen: Toyo Press. pp. 600 pages. ISBN 978-9492722300.
- Schmorleitz, Morton S. (1974). Castles in Japan. Tokyo: Charles E. Tuttle Co. pp. 144–145. ISBN 0-8048-1102-4.
- Motoo, Hinago (1986). Japanese Castles. Tokyo: Kodansha. p. 200 pages. ISBN 0-87011-766-1.
- Mitchelhill, Jennifer (2004). Castles of the Samurai: Power and Beauty. Tokyo: Kodansha. p. 112 pages. ISBN 4-7700-2954-3.
- Turnbull, Stephen (2003). Japanese Castles 1540-1640. Osprey Publishing. p. 64 pages. ISBN 1-84176-429-9.
