= Nobutsuna =

- Gender: Male

Origin
- Origin: Japanese
- Meaning: Different meanings depending on the kanji used

Nobutsuna (written: 信綱) is a masculine Japanese given name. Notable people with the name include:

- Kamiizumi Nobutsuna (上泉 伊勢守 信綱), Japanese samurai
- Matsudaira Nobutsuna (松平 信綱) (1596–1662), Japanese daimyō
- Sanada Nobutsuna (真田 信綱) (1537–1575), Japanese samurai
- Sasaki Nobutsuna (佐佐木 信綱) (1872–1963), Japanese poet
