= Samurai Warriors: Spirit of Sanada =

2016 video game

- Game cover featuring Yukimura Sanada and Masayuki Sanada
- Developer: Omega Force
- Publisher: Koei Tecmo
- Series: Samurai Warriors
- Platforms: PlayStation 3 PlayStation 4 PlayStation Vita; Nintendo Switch; Microsoft Windows
- Release: PlayStation 3, PlayStation Vita: JP: November 23, 2016; PlayStation 4: JP: November 23, 2016; NA: May 23, 2017; EU: May 26, 2017; Microsoft Windows: WW: May 23, 2017; Nintendo Switch: JP: November 9, 2017
- Genre: Hack and slash
- Mode: Single-player

Samurai Warriors: Spirit of Sanada, known in Japan as Sengoku Musou ~Sanada Maru~ (戦国無双 ～真田丸～), is a hack and slash game by Koei Tecmo through their development subsidiary, Omega Force. It is a spin-off of Samurai Warriors 4, part of the Samurai Warriors series, which in turn is a spin-off of the long-running Dynasty Warriors series, both of which are also hack and slash games. It was released on November 23, 2016 in Japan to coincide with the airing of the climax episode of the ongoing NHK TV taiga drama Sanada Maru. It was released in North America and Europe in 2017.

== Development ==
The game's existence was first revealed in a Dengeki PlayStation in July 2016. Famitsu covered the first details and screenshots, including the nature of its collaboration with the taiga drama Sanada Maru. The current version of the game is 1.05 which was released in July 2017. Various weapons set were released as DLC. PS4 Pro owners have the option to play in 4K.

== Gameplay ==
The game retains the basic hack and slash play of the main series. The player controls a character through a specific battlefield against an army of enemy soldiers with the ultimate objective of killing the enemy's commander, although the player will be encouraged to complete side objectives that will raise the morale of the player's allies or acquiring rewards. Spirit of Sanada reuses the engine of Samurai Warriors 4 and its expansions and retains that game's play style and features. New features added include the addition of long-term battles, which are divided into several separate skirmishes affected by a day-and-night cycle that the player need to clear. A mechanic called "Stratagems" is added, which allows the player to use a gimmick midway through the battle to aid the player's cause, such as calling reinforcements or building bridges. Stratagems requires "Sanada Coins", obtained by meeting several conditions throughout the game or collected in the new Castle Town format.

The game also revamps the menu system. Like Dynasty Warriors 7: Xtreme Legends but unlike the main series, the player does not choose a game mode in a separate menu system. Instead, once the player starts a playthrough, they are given immediate control of their chosen character, albeit in a hub area called the "Castle Town". There, the player can access Story Mode, Gallery, and other modes by interacting with the environment, such as talking with the NPCs. The player can also do other activities such as purchasing horses, exploring the outskirts to face enemies and collect items, or go fishing to gather valuable materials or form bonds with other officers.

The game uses a Full 3D Map of the Warring States period of Japan for situational explanations. By moving the camera across the map, players are able to view the lands where battles have been held from various angles.

== Story ==
Like the main series, Spirit of Sanada explores and romanticizes the Sengoku period of Japan, a period of political and military conflict involving the daimyōs and their clans raising armies to fight against each other for power. While the main series features multiple viewpoints involving different factions, Spirit of Sanada focuses on one particular clan, the Sanada, who are led by Masayuki and his sons, Nobuyuki and Yukimura during the Sengoku period. The game's timeline is roughly 54 years (from 1561 to 1615) and follows different incarnations of the main characters, who are aged up accordingly.

== Characters ==
The game features the entire cast of Samurai Warriors 4 and its expansions and adds three new playable officers. There are also several different incarnations of the existing ones to fit the game's timeline. Altogether, the cast amounts to 61, not including the different incarnations. The new characters are:

- Masayuki Sanada is the head of the Sanada clan during the late Sengoku period and the father of Nobuyuki and Yukimura. Masayuki is playable in both his young and older adult incarnations. His weapon is a Bardiche with banner.
- Chacha is a concubine of Hideyoshi Toyotomi and a daughter of Nagamasa Azai and Oichi. Chacha is playable in both her child and young adult incarnations. Her weapon is a kanzashi.
- Sasuke is a ninja trained by Hattori Hanzō and assistant to Yukimura Sanada. His weapon is a pair of arm blades.
- Katsuyori Takeda is Shingen's son and successor as head of the Takeda clan. His weapon is a spear.
- Hidetada Tokugawa is Ieyasu's son and heir of the Tokugawa clan. Hidetada is playable in both his young and older adult incarnations. His weapon is a sword.

=== Returning characters ===
SW	SW2	SW3	SW4
Goemon Ishikawa	Ginchiyo Tachibana	Aya	Hisahide Matsunaga
Hanzō Hattori	Gracia	Hanbei Takenaka	Kagekatsu Uesugi
Hideyoshi Toyotomi	Ieyasu Tokugawa*	Kai	Kojūrō Katakura
Ina	Kanetsugu Naoe	Kanbei Kuroda	Koshōshō
Keiji Maeda	Katsuie Shibata	Kiyomasa Katō	Lady Hayakawa
Kenshin Uesugi	Kojirō Sasaki	Masanori Fukushima	Naomasa Ii
Kunoichi	Kotarō Fūma	Motonari Mōri	Nobuyuki Sanada*
Magoichi Saika	Mitsunari Ishida	Munenori Yagyū	Takakage Kobayakawa
Masamune Date	Motochika Chōsokabe	Muneshige Tachibana	Toyohisa Shimazu
Mitsuhide Akechi	Musashi Miyamoto	Naotora Ii	Yoshitsugu Ōtani
Nobunaga Oda	Nagamasa Azai	Takatora Tōdō	
Nō	Nene	Ujiyasu Hōjō	
Oichi	Sakon Shima		
Okuni	Toshiie Maeda		
Ranmaru Mori	Yoshihiro Shimazu		
Shingen Takeda			
Tadakatsu Honda			
Yoshimoto Imagawa			
Yukimura Sanada*			

(*) = Available in child, and young and older adult incarnations

== Reception ==
Reception

Aggregate scores
Aggregator	Score
GameRankings	(PS4) 73.67%
Metacritic	(PS4) 74/100

Review scores
Publication	Score
Destructoid	8.5/10
Famitsu	35/40
Hardcore Gamer	4/5

Samurai Warriors: Spirit of Sanada has received positive critical reception, with Famitsu giving a score of 35 out of 40 in all versions of the game. During the first week of release in Japan, the PS4 version of the game sold 26,682 physical retail copies, ranking fourth place amongst all Japanese software sales within that week, whilst the PS Vita version sold 13,049 physical retail copies, and the PS3 version sold 11,040 physical retail copies.
