= Siege of Ueda =

1600 siege in Japan

- Part of the Sengoku period
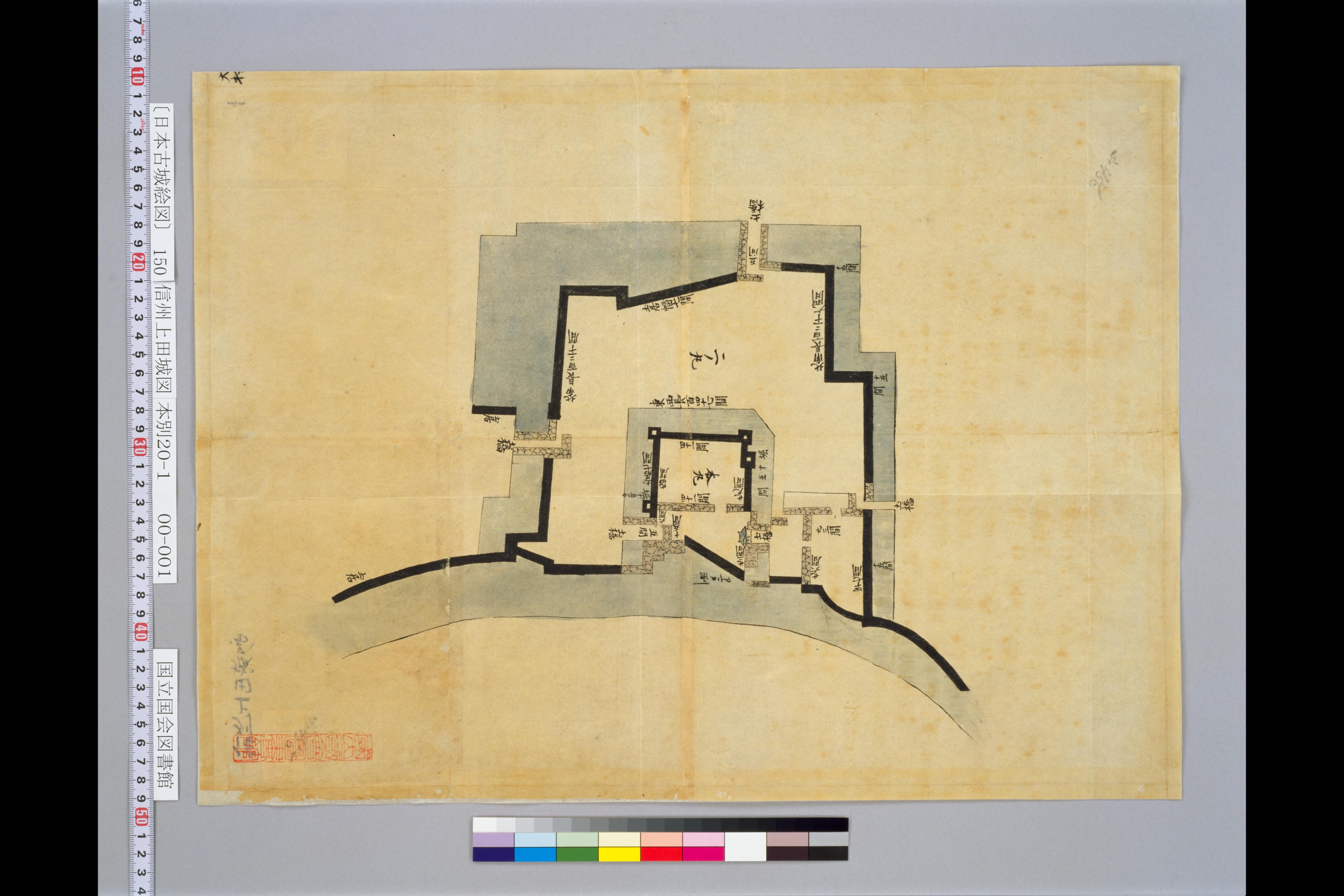
- Floor Plan of Ueda Castle
Date	1600
Location	Ueda Castle, Shinano province, Japan 36°24′15″N 138°14′38″E
Result	Sanada clan garrison victory
Territorial changes	Siege abandoned

Belligerents
Forces of Tokugawa clan	Forces of Sanada clan

Commanders and leaders
Tokugawa Hidetada; Sakakibara Yasumasa; Honda Masanobu; Sengoku Hidehisa; Okudaira Nobumasa; Ōkubo Tadachika; Koriki Tadafusa; Shizume Koreaki	Sanada Masayuki; Sanada Yukimura

Strength
38,000	2,000
- Location within Nagano Prefecture Siege of Ueda (Japan)

The siege of Ueda was staged in 1600 by Tokugawa Hidetada, son and heir of the warlord Tokugawa Ieyasu, against Ueda castle garrison in Shinano province, which was controlled by the Sanada family.

Hidetada came across the castle as he marched his army along the Nakasendō (central mountain road) from Edo to rendezvous with his father's forces. Sanada Masayuki resisted, and Sanada Yukimura, second son of Masayuki, was able to fight Hidetada's 38,000 men with only 2,000 men. However, when the castle did not fall as quickly as Hidetada had hoped and expected, he gave up and abandoned the siege and hurried to meet up with his father at Sekigahara. As a result of this delay, Hidetada missed the battle of Sekigahara, the decisive victory in his father's unification of Japan.

== In popular culture ==
In the 2009 movie Summer Wars, the fictional Jinnouchi family was descended from those who fought during the siege, making explicit reference to the victory of 2,000 men over 38,000 enemies; the director, Momoru Hosoda, chose Ueda as the primary setting of the film after visiting his then-fiancée's home in Ueda, and it was also close to Hosoda's birthplace.
