= Numata, Gunma =

Numata 沼田市
- City
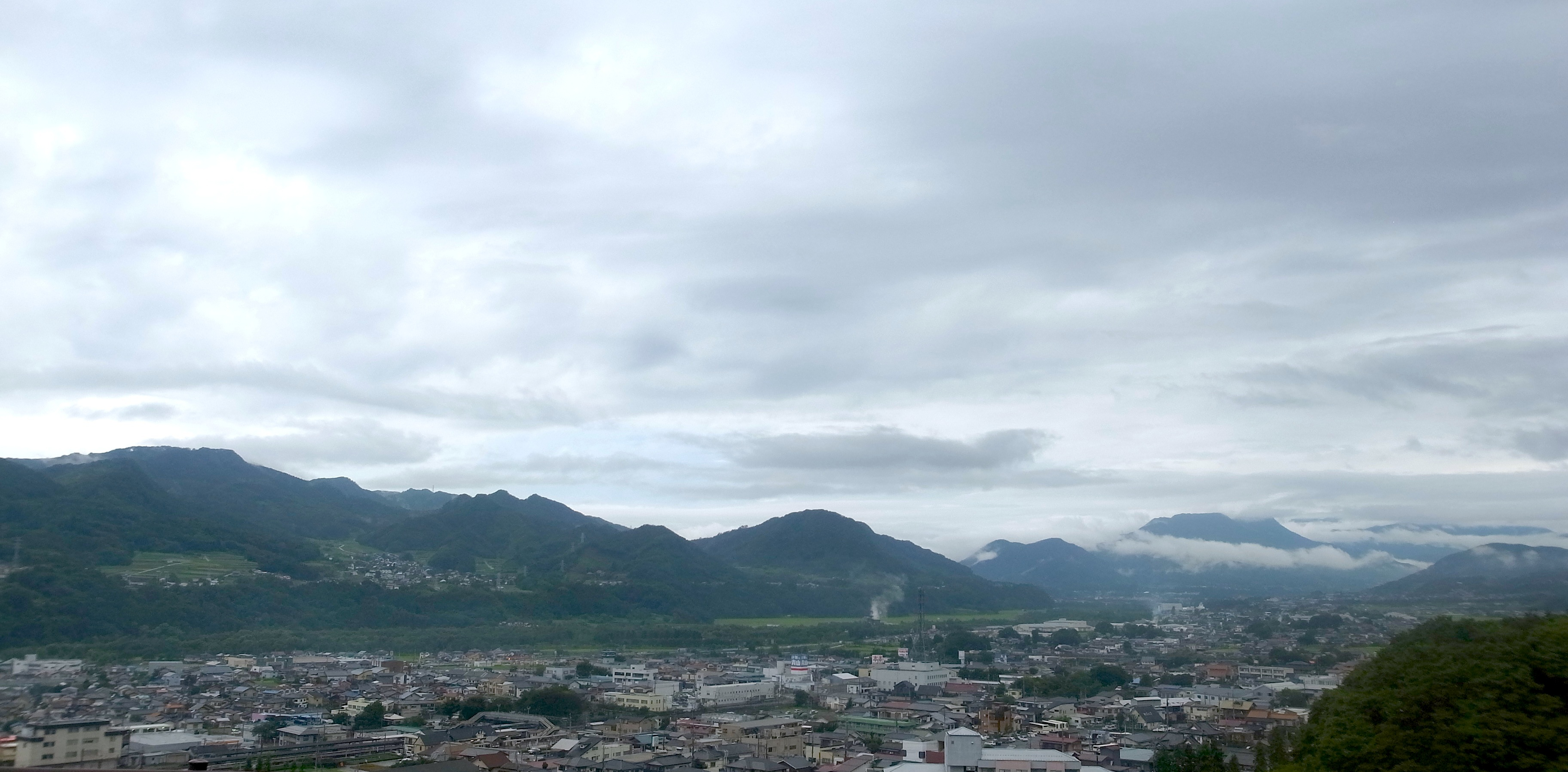
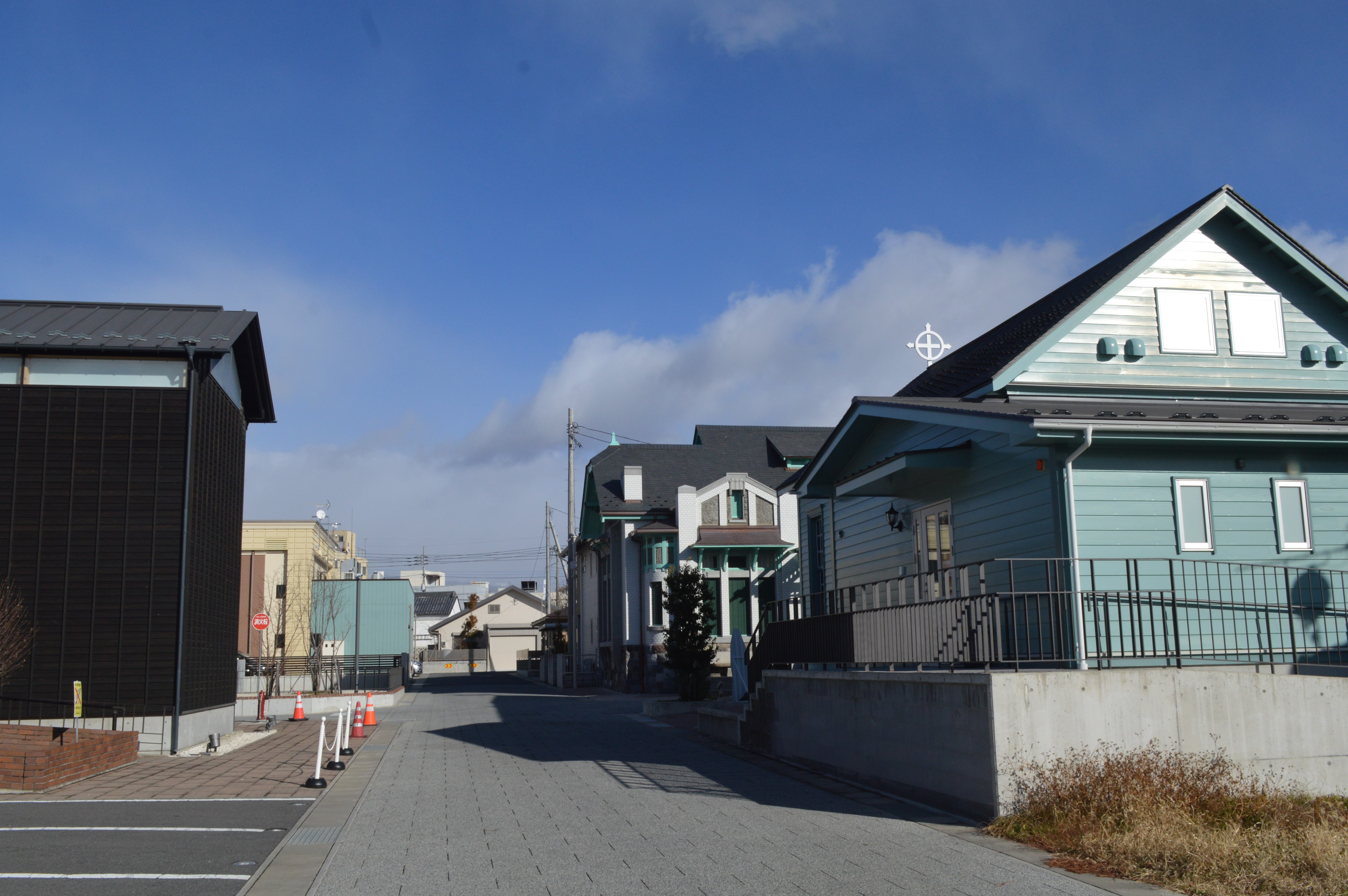
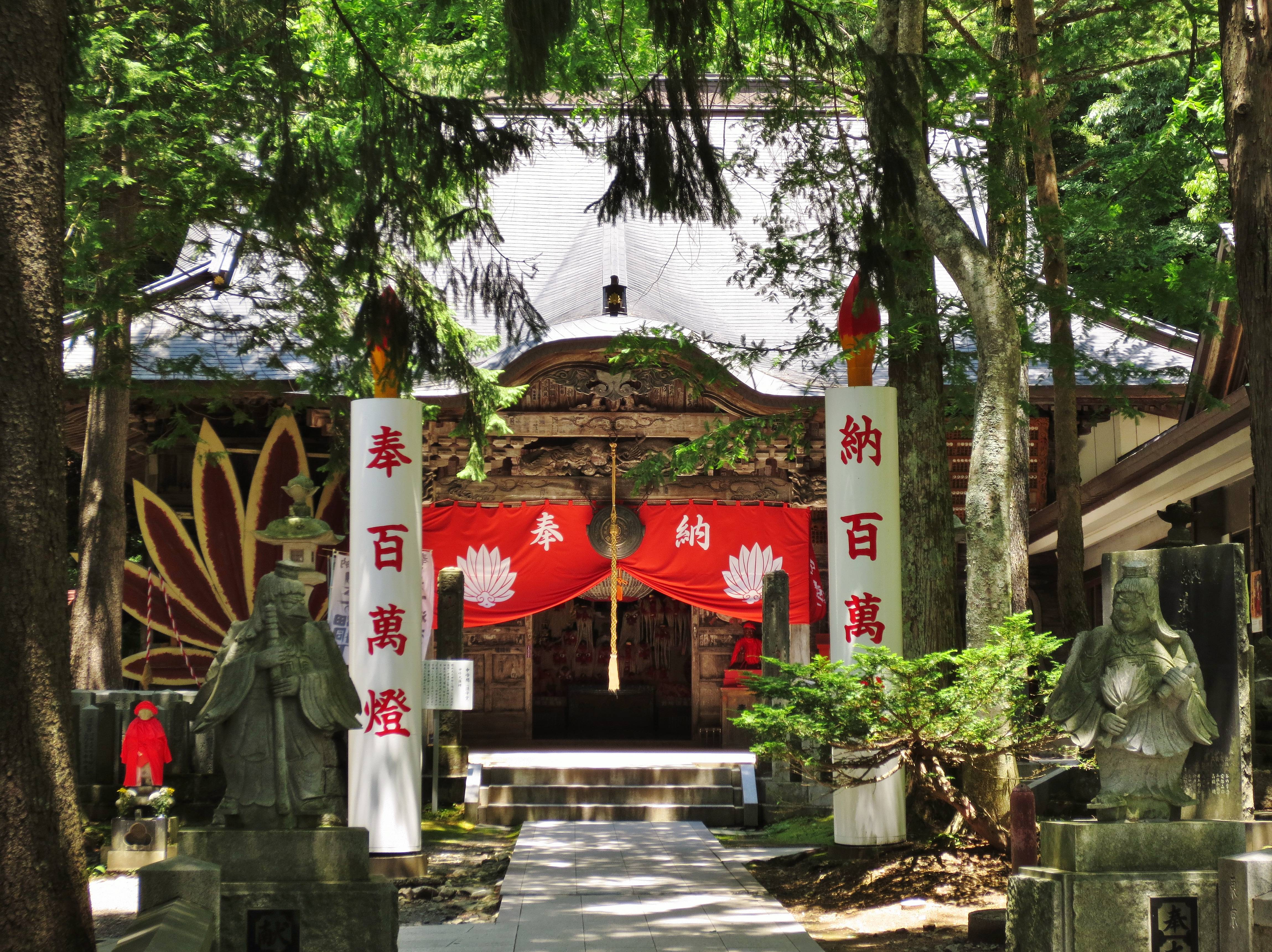
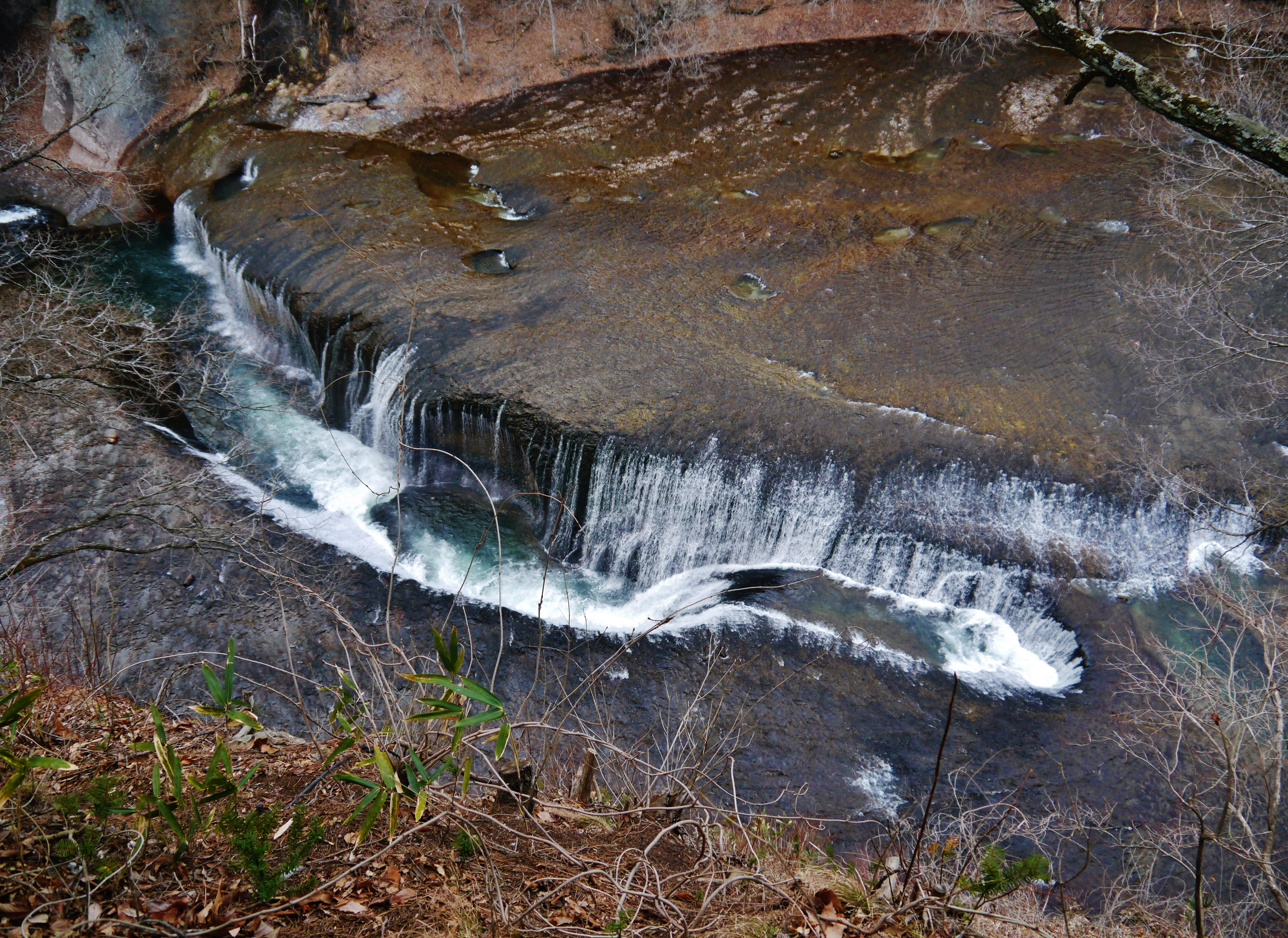
- City view Taishō-era Traditional Residence area Numata Miroku Temple Fukiware Falls

- Flag Emblem

- Location of Numata in Gunma Prefecture

- Coordinates: 36°38′45.7″N 139°2′39″E
- Country: Japan
- Region: Kantō
- Prefecture: Gunma
- Town settled: April 1, 1889
- City settled: April 1, 1954

Government
  - Mayor: Minoru Hoshino (星野稔) - from May 2022

Area
  - Total: 443.46 km^{2} (171.22 sq mi)

Population (July 2020)
  - Total: 46,908
  - Density: 105.78/km^{2} (273.96/sq mi)
- Time zone: UTC+9 (Japan Standard Time)
- Phone number: 0278-23-2111
- Address: Shimono-machi 999, Numata-shi, Gunma-ken 378-8501
- Climate: Cfa
- Website: Official website
- Symbols
- Flower: Chinese bellflower
- Tree: Sakura

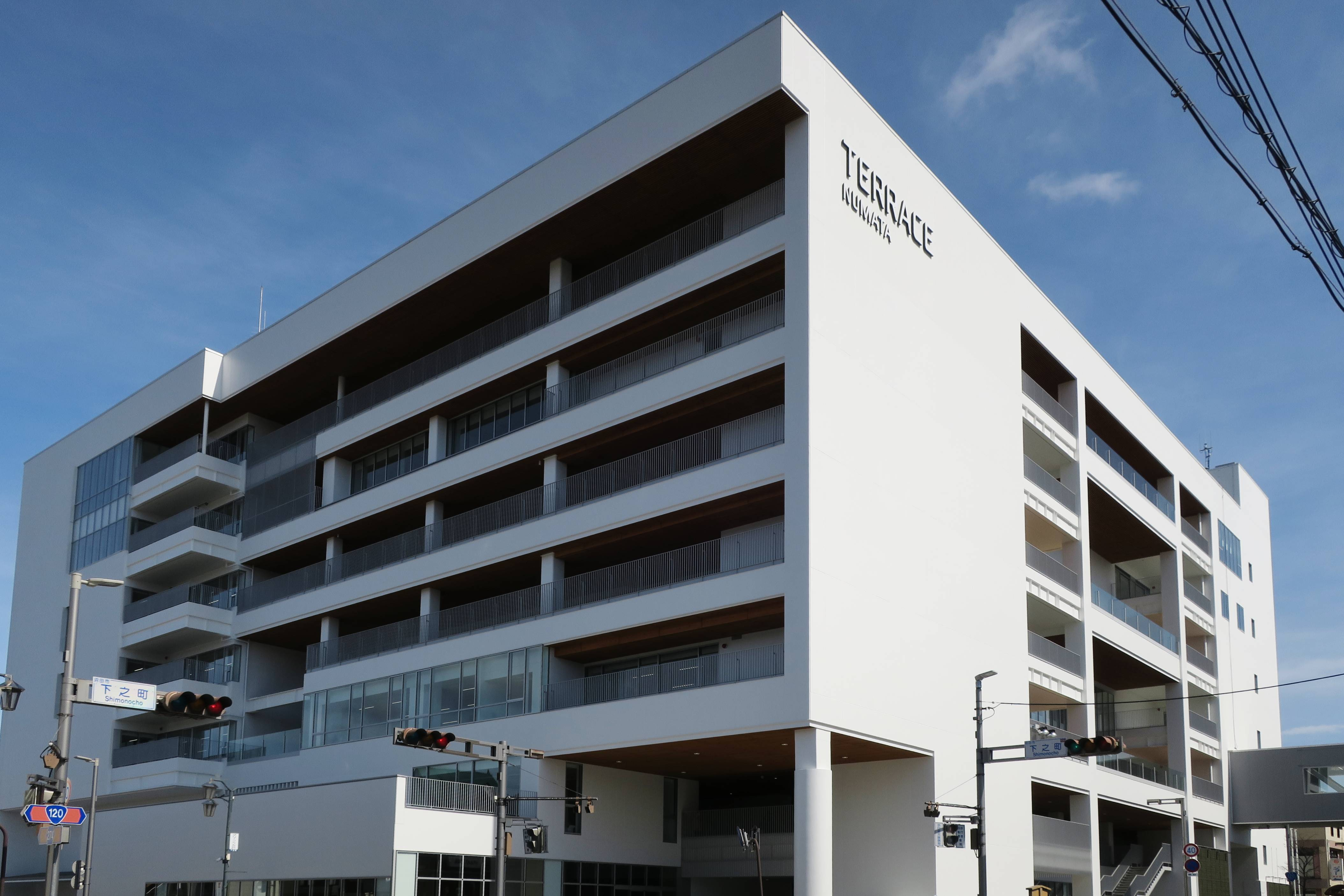
Numata city hall

Numata (沼田市, Numata-shi) is a city located in Gunma Prefecture, Japan. As of 31 July 2020, the city had an estimated population of 46,908 in 20,589 households, and a population density of 110 persons per km^{2}. The total area of the city is 443.46 square kilometres (171.22 sq mi), making it the largest city in terms of area within Gunma Prefecture. (The neighboring town of Minakami is the largest municipality in terms of area within Gunma.)

== Geography ==
Numata is located in northern Gunma Prefecture. The Tone River flows through the western part of the city and the tributary, the Katashina River, flows through the southern end, forming a large river terrace. The downtown area is located at the top of the terrace, along the Tone River.

- Mountains: Kesamaruyama (1961m), Mount Akagi (1828m)
- Rivers: Tone River, Katashina River

=== Surrounding municipalities ===
Gunma Prefecture

- Katashina
- Kawaba
- Kiryū
- Maebashi
- Midori
- Minakami
- Shibukawa
- Shōwa
- Takayama

Tochigi Prefecture

- Nikkō

== Climate ==
Numata has a humid subtropical climate (Köppen Cfa) characterized by warm summers and cold winters with heavy snowfall. The average annual temperature in Numata is 12.0 °C. The average annual rainfall is 1522 mm with September as the wettest month. The temperatures are highest on average in August, at around 24.7 °C, and lowest in January, at around 0.1 °C.

Climate data for Numata (1991–2020 normals, extremes 1977–present)
Month	Jan	Feb	Mar	Apr	May	Jun	Jul	Aug	Sep	Oct	Nov	Dec	Year
Record high °C (°F)	14.9 (58.8)	20.6 (69.1)	24.9 (76.8)	29.9 (85.8)	33.5 (92.3)	37.9 (100.2)	37.7 (99.9)	38.1 (100.6)	37.0 (98.6)	31.0 (87.8)	24.6 (76.3)	20.7 (69.3)	38.1 (100.6)
Mean daily maximum °C (°F)	5.0 (41.0)	6.2 (43.2)	10.3 (50.5)	16.7 (62.1)	22.2 (72.0)	25.2 (77.4)	29.0 (84.2)	30.3 (86.5)	25.6 (78.1)	19.6 (67.3)	13.8 (56.8)	8.1 (46.6)	17.7 (63.9)
Daily mean °C (°F)	−0.1 (31.8)	0.7 (33.3)	4.4 (39.9)	10.4 (50.7)	15.9 (60.6)	19.8 (67.6)	23.7 (74.7)	24.6 (76.3)	20.4 (68.7)	14.1 (57.4)	7.8 (46.0)	2.5 (36.5)	12.1 (53.8)
Mean daily minimum °C (°F)	−4.6 (23.7)	−4.1 (24.6)	−0.9 (30.4)	4.3 (39.7)	9.9 (49.8)	15.1 (59.2)	19.5 (67.1)	20.3 (68.5)	16.3 (61.3)	9.6 (49.3)	2.6 (36.7)	−2.2 (28.0)	7.2 (45.0)
Record low °C (°F)	−14.4 (6.1)	−14.0 (6.8)	−12.5 (9.5)	−5.5 (22.1)	−1.4 (29.5)	3.7 (38.7)	10.8 (51.4)	10.0 (50.0)	5.0 (41.0)	−2.2 (28.0)	−8.7 (16.3)	−12.2 (10.0)	−14.4 (6.1)
Average precipitation mm (inches)	42.0 (1.65)	42.8 (1.69)	64.7 (2.55)	65.3 (2.57)	90.4 (3.56)	130.1 (5.12)	178.4 (7.02)	168.1 (6.62)	152.3 (6.00)	113.1 (4.45)	47.4 (1.87)	37.8 (1.49)	1,132.3 (44.58)
Average precipitation days (≥ 1.0 mm)	7.0	7.5	9.1	8.6	9.8	13.2	14.9	12.7	11.9	9.2	6.3	6.7	116.8
Mean monthly sunshine hours	174.1	176.1	204.9	209.8	213.3	163.6	167.4	197.5	147.8	156.6	171.4	176.7	2,159.1
Source: Japan Meteorological Agency (1991–2020 normals, extremes 1977–present)

== Demographics ==
Per Japanese census data, the population of Numata declined slightly over the past 40 years.

Historical population
Year	Pop.	±%
1920	37,674	—
1930	52,906	+40.4%
1940	86,086	+62.7%
1950	95,533	+11.0%
1960	56,346	−41.0%
1970	54,311	−3.6%
1980	56,828	+4.6%
1990	56,099	−1.3%
2000	55,278	−1.5%
2010	51,265	−7.3%
2020	45,337	−11.6%

== History ==
Numata developed during the Sengoku period as a castle town surrounding Numata Castle, a stronghold in Kōzuke Province contested by the Uesugi, Takeda, Later Hōjō and Sanada clans. During the Edo period, the area of present-day Numata was the center of the Numata Domain, a 35,000 koku feudal domain held by then Toki clan under the Tokugawa shogunate.

Numata Town was created within Tone District, Gunma Prefecture on April 1, 1889 with the creation of the modern municipalities system after the Meiji Restoration. On March 1, 1954, Numata merged with neighboring Tonami, Ikeda, Usune and Kawada villages, and was raised to city status. On February 13, 2005, the villages of Shirasawa and Tone were incorporated into Numata.

== Government ==
Numata has a mayor-council form of government with a directly elected mayor and a unicameral city council of 20 members. Numata contributes one member to the Gunma Prefectural Assembly. In terms of national politics, the city is part of Gunma 1st district of the lower house of the Diet of Japan.

== Economy ==
Numata is a regional commercial center and transportation hub, but was traditionally known for lumber production.

== Education ==
Numata has 12 public elementary schools and nine public middle schools operated by the city government, and four public high schools operated by the Gunma Prefectural Board of Education. The prefecture also operates a special education school for the handicapped.

=== Elementary schools ===
- Hiragawa Elementary School
- Ikeda Elementary School
- Kawada Elementary School
- Masugata Elementary School
- Numata Elementary School
- Numata Higashi Elementary School
- Numata Kita Elementary School
- Shirasawa Elementary School
- Tana Elementary School
- Tonami Higashi Elementary School
- Tone Azuma Elementary School
- Tone Nishi Elementary School
- Usune Elementary School

=== Middle schools ===
- Ikeda Middle School
- Numata Middle School
- Numata Higashi Middle School
- Numata Minami Middle School
- Numata Nishi Middle School
- Shirasawa Middle School
- Tana Middle School
- Tone Middle School
- Usune Middle School

=== High schools ===
- Numata Girls' High School
- Numata High School
- Oze High School
- Tone Jitsu High School

== Transportation ==
=== Railway ===
- JR East – Jōetsu Line
- Numata - Iwamoto

=== Highway ===
- Kan-etsu Expressway – Numata IC
- National Route 17
- National Route 120
- National Route 145
- National Route 291

== Local attractions ==
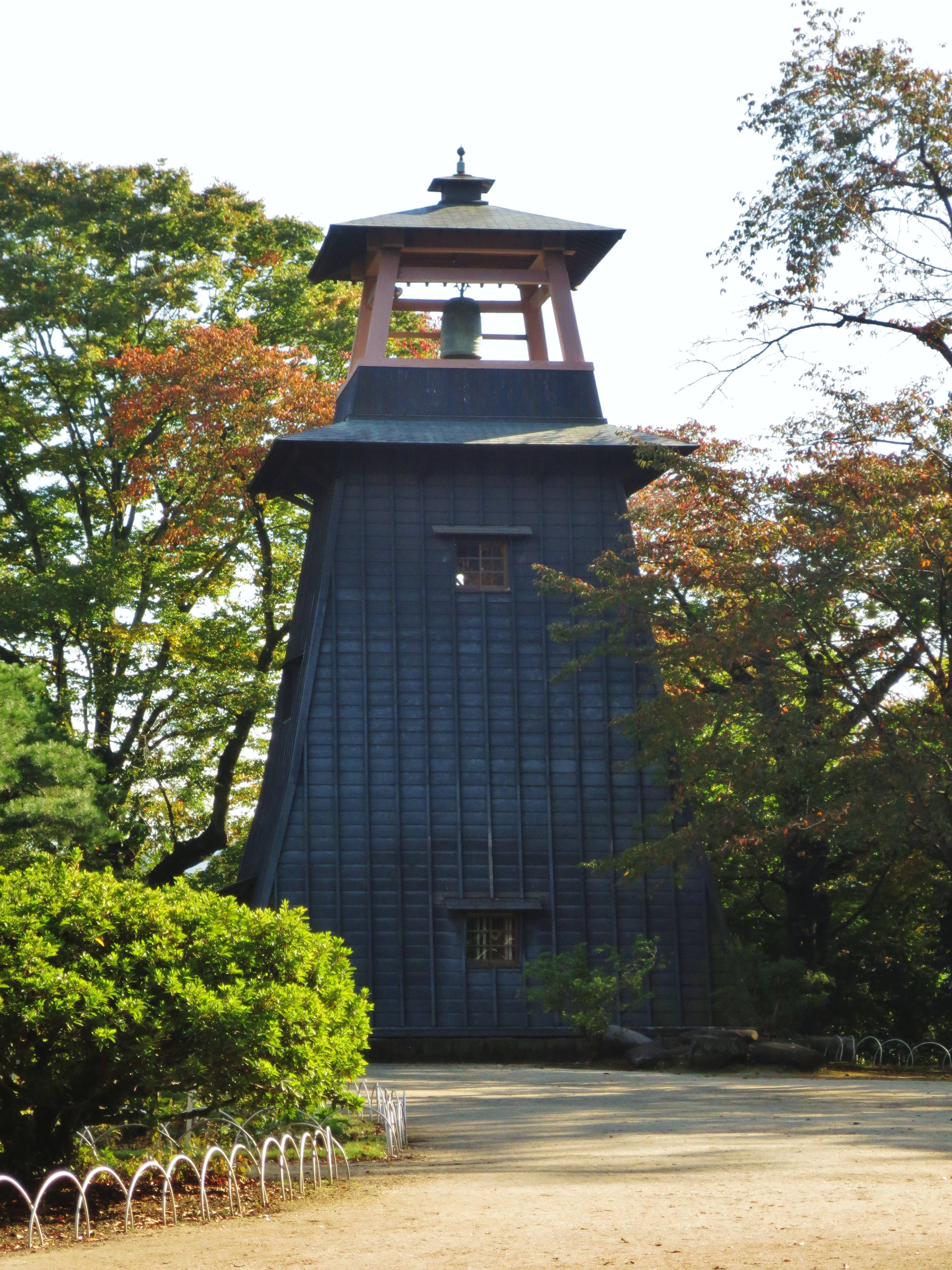
Numata Castle bell tower

- Fukiware Falls, National Place of Scenic Beauty and Natural Monument; One of Japan’s Top 100 Waterfalls
- Site of Numata Castle
- Oigami Onsen
- Tamahara Dam
- Tambara Ski Park

== Sister-city relations ==
- Shimoda, Shizuoka, Japan, since May 1966
- Füssen, Bavaria, Germany since September 1995

== Notable people ==
- Koji Omi, politician
- Ukyo Sasahara, racing driver
- Kona Takahashi, professional baseball player
- Tochiakagi Takanori, sumo wrestler
