= Nagurumi Castle =

Castle ruins in Tone, Japan

- 名胡桃城
- Tone, Gunma Prefecture, Japan
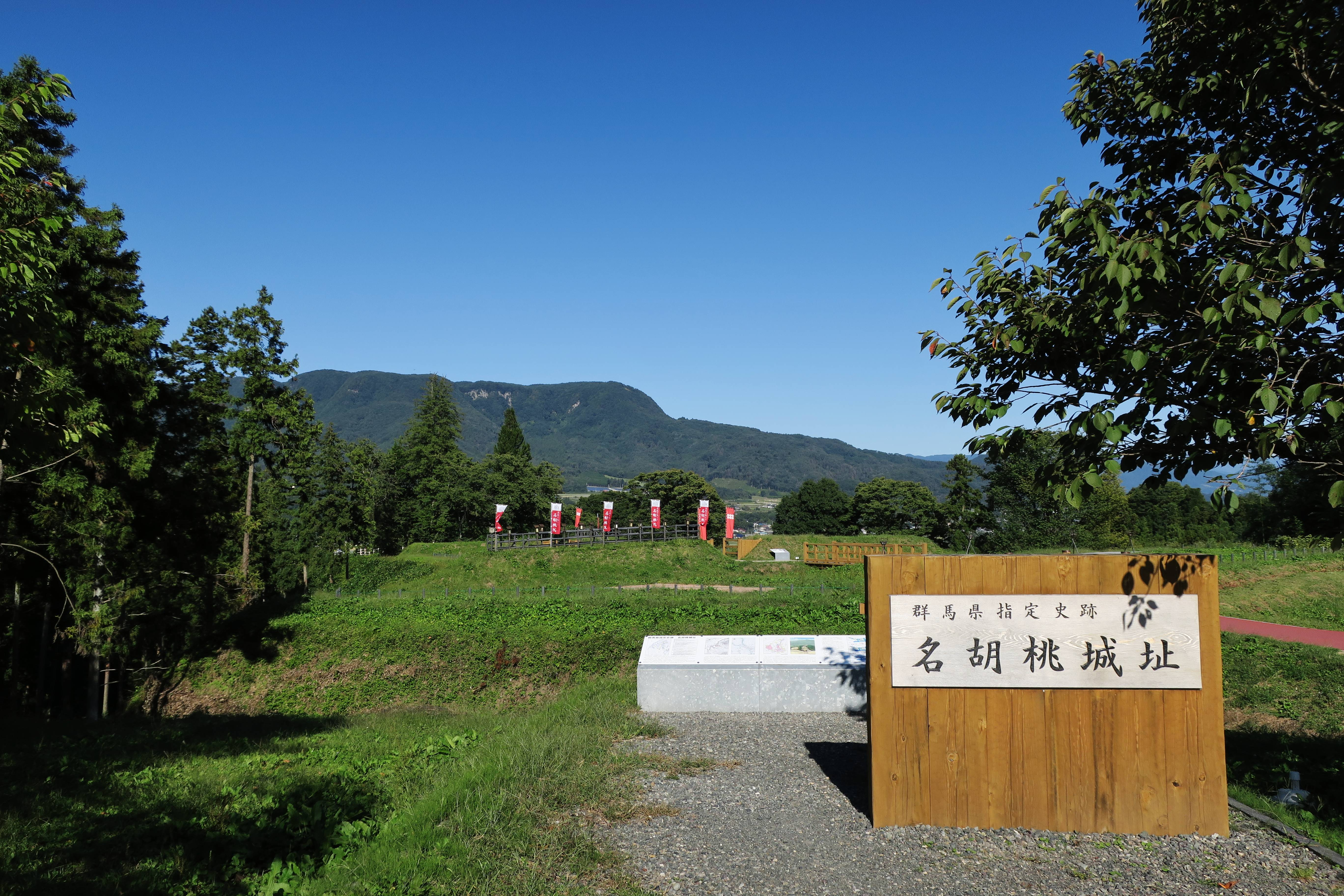
- Nagurumi Castle

Site information
- Type: Hirayama-style castle
- Owner: Numata clan, Sanada clan
- Condition: ruins

Location
- Coordinates: 36.6694°N 138.9913°E

Site history
- Built: 1492
- Built by: Numata clan
- Demolished: 1590
- Events: Siege of Nagurumi Castle

Garrison information
- Past commanders: Suzuki Shigenori

Nagurumi Castle (名胡桃城, Nagurumi-jō) is a castle structure in Tone, Gunma Prefecture, Japan. The castle played historically important role because invasion of the castle by the Later Hōjō clan caused Siege of Odawara (1590).

The castle is now only ruins, just some moats and earthworks. The castle was listed as one of the Continued Top 100 Japanese Castles in 2017.

== See also ==
- List of Historic Sites of Japan (Gunma)
