= Numata (surname) =

Numata (written: 沼田) is a Japanese surname. Notable people with the surname include:

- Hirofumi Numata (沼田 宏文; born 1952), Japanese basketball player
- Numata Jakō (沼田 麝香; 1544–1618), Japanese samurai
- Keigo Numata (沼田 圭悟; born 1990), Japanese footballer
- Kosei Numata (沼田 航征; born 2002), Japanese footballer
- Mahokaru Numata (沼田 まほかる; born 1948), Japanese writer
- Noriyasu Numata (沼田 憲保; 1966–2007), Japanese motorcycle racer
- Shinsuke Numata (沼田 真佑; born 1978), Japanese writer
- Suzuko Numata (1923–2011), Japanese peace activist
- Yaichi Numata (沼田 弥一; born 1951), Japanese cyclist
- Yoichi Numata (沼田 曜一; 1924–2006), Japanese actor
- Yoshiaki Numata (沼田 義明; born 1945), Japanese boxer
- Yūsuke Numata (沼田 祐介; born 1968), Japanese voice actor
