= Sanada Masayuki =

Sengoku Daimyo and Head of the Sanada Clan

- 真田 昌幸
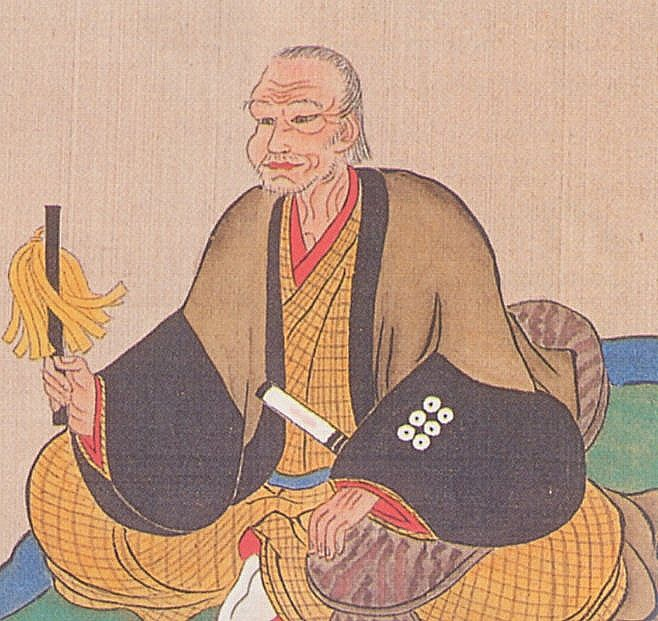

Head of Sanada clan
- In office 1575–1600
- Preceded by: Sanada Nobutsuna
- Succeeded by: Sanada Nobuyuki

Personal details
- Born: 1547
- Died: June 13, 1611 (aged 63–64) Kudoyama
- Spouse: Yamanote-dono
- Children: Muramatsu-dono; Sanada Nobuyuki; Sanada Yukimura; Sanada Masachika; Kikuhime (b.1580)
- Parent: Sanada Yukitaka (father)
- Relatives: Sanada Nobutsuna (brother); Sanada Masateru (brother); Komatsuhime (daughter-in-law); Chikurin-in (daughter-in-law); Seiin-in (niece and daughter-in-law)

Military service
- Allegiance: Takeda clan Oda clan Later Hōjō clan Tokugawa clan Uesugi clan Toyotomi clan Western Army
- Unit: Sanada clan
- Battles/wars: Battles of Kawanakajima (1561); Siege of Odawara (1569); Battle of Mimasetoge (1569); Battle of Mikatagahara (1573); Battle of Nagashino (1575); Tenshō-Jingo war (1582); Battle of Kamigawa (1585); Siege of Matsuida (1590); Siege of Ueda (1600)

Sanada Masayuki (真田 昌幸; 1547 – July 13, 1611) was a Japanese Sengoku period lord and daimyō. He was the head of Sanada clan, a regional house of Shinano Province, which became a vassal of the Takeda clan of Kai Province. Along with his father and brothers, Masayuki served the Takeda clan during its heyday, when it was led by Takeda Shingen. After its downfall, Masayuki took the lead of his clan and, despite little power, he managed to establish himself as an independent daimyō under the Toyotomi regime through skillful political maneuvers amidst the powerful Tokugawa, Hōjō and Uesugi clans.

Known for having defeated the powerful Tokugawa army in the Battle of Kami river and Siege of Ueda, Masayuki is now considered one of the greatest military strategists of his era. In recent times, a number of portrayals in novels, films and other forms of media have contributed to his increased popularity.

== Biography ==
He was born the third son of Sanada Yukitaka in 1547, but the exact date is unknown. His childhood name was Gengorō (源五郎). At birth, he had no right to succeed his father because of his two older brothers, Nobutsuna and Masateru.

In 1553, at seven years old, he was sent to the Takeda clan's headquarters in Kai as a hostage. There he becomes part of the Okukinjūshū (奥近習衆), a group of six young servants close to Takeda Shingen. According to the Kōyō Gunkan, Shingen favoured him as he soon recognized that Masayuki's talents and insight rivaled those of his father Yukitaka. As such, he is sometimes included among the Twenty Four Generals, alongside his father and two older brothers.

In 1558, he became the foster son of the Mutō family, a branch of the Ōi clan, of which Shingen's mother descended from, and adopted the name Mutō Kihei (武藤喜兵衛).

=== Service under Takeda ===
Towards 1564, he married Yamanote-dono (山手殿), a daughter of Uda Yoritada, who was a local lord of Tōtōmi Province. Later she gave birth to his two sons Nobuyuki and Nobushige. During this period, he participated in many battles under the Takeda clan, including his first battle in the Fourth Battle of Kawanakajima (1561), Siege of Odawara (1569) and the Battle of Mimasetōge (1569). Also most importantly, from 1572 onwards, he joined Shingen in his campaign towards Kyoto against the Oda and Tokugawa alliance and took part in the Battle of Mikatagahara (1573).

In May 1573, Shingen died amidst his campaign and so Masayuki continued to serve his heir Takeda Katsuyori.

In 1574, his father Yukitaka died. At that point, his eldest brother Sanada Nobutsuna had already succeeded his father as the head of the Sanada clan. However, during the disastrous Battle of Nagashino (1575) against the Oda clan, both his older brothers, Nobutsuna and Masateru, were killed, so he came back to Sanada clan and claimed his inheritance. In this, Masayuki supposedly had the support of Kōsaka Masanobu, who held Kaizu Castle in Northern Shinano and was also a chief retainer of the Takeda clan. Katsuyori accepted his claim without any qualms.

In 1579, a year after Uesugi Kenshin's death, an alliance between the Takeda and Uesugi clans was established. The following year, ordered by Takeda Katsuyori, Masayuki invaded western Kōzuke, which was a Hōjō domain at the time, and seized Numata Castle, putting it under control of the Takeda clan. The same year, he was appointed the title of Awa-no-kami (従五位下・安房守).

In 1581, he was ordered by Katsuyori to supervise the construction of the new Shinpu Castle at Nirasaki. In the same year, Numata Kageyoshi, former lord of Numata Castle, attempted to retake his old fief, but Masayuki schemed to assassinate him and thwarted his plans.

In April 1582, Oda and Tokugawa allied forces started an invasion of the Takeda territory. It is said that Masayuki had intended to shelter Katsuyori and advised him to abandon Kai Province and flee towards Sanada's domain in Kōzuke(Iwabitsu Castle). Instead, Katsuyori decided to take shelter at Oyamada Nobushige's Iwadono Castle, but was betrayed and ultimately died at Tenmokuzan.

After the fall of the Takeda clan, Masayuki yielded to Oda Nobunaga and was put under the orders of one of Nobunaga's chief commanders, Takigawa Kazumasu. Masayuki managed to retain most of his domain, but had to abdicate Numata Castle to Takigawa Masushigue, Kazumasu's relative.

=== Tenshō-Jingo Conflict ===
However, Nobunaga soon died at the Incident at Honnō-ji on June 21, 1582. Upon Nobunaga's death, Oda clan's grasp over former Takeda territories weakened. Amidst the chaos, Oda retainers who were assigned by Nobunaga to govern those territories, such as Mori Nagayoshi and Kawajiri Hidetaka amongst others, either fled or were killed by local insurrection.

After the chaos following the death of Nobunaga, Tokugawa Ieyasu invaded Kai and Shinano province to establish control there on the consent from senior vassals of Oda clan. (Note: Ieyasu's position and actions here are not those of an independent feudal lord, but as a feudal lord under the Oda regime, with the aim of defeating the Hōjō clan) However, at the same time, Uesugi clan and the Hōjō clan also aspired to seize the vast area in Shinano Province, Kōzuke Province, and Kai Province (currently Gunma Prefecture), which ruled by the remnants of the many small clans formerly serving Takeda clan. following of disorder post death of Nobunaga, at the same time with Ieyasu departure an army of 8,000 soldiers to those disputed region. This caused the triangle conflict between those three factions in the event which dubbed by historians as Tenshō-Jingo War (天正壬午の乱, Tenshō-Jingo no ran) broke out. (Note: The name of "Tenshō-Jingo War" was coined by Tashiro Takashi in 1980. Furthermore, is also a theory that from the perspective that local powers which continued to fight over the possession of the Oda clan's leftover territories, there is evidence that Tokugawa Ieyasu's transfer to the Kantō region following the fall of the Hōjō clan in 1590 and the placement of Toyotomi-line daimyo, until transfer of Uesugi Kagekatsu to Aizu, where the local daimyo were separated from their former territory and the establishment of control by the Azuchi–Momoyama period, was considered to be the extension of this conflict.)

On June 13, the Hōjō clan had captured Iwadono Castle in Tsuru District, and instructed Watanabe Shozaemon, a local magnate from Tsuru District to assist them in their conquest. Subsequently, Sanada Masayuki led his army and received Numata Castle to the Uesugi clan. On July 9, Masayuki changed his allegiance from the Uesugi clan to the Hōjō, he surrendered to Hōjō Ujinao.

On July 5, Takigawa Kazumasu lost decisively against the invading Hōjō army at the Battle of Kannagawa. In that occasion, Masayuki actually escorted back Kazumasu's remaining forces through Suwa, in Shinano. Though, seeing this chance, Masayuki sent his uncle Yazawa Yoritsuna and took back Numata Castle. Also, he put his oldest son Nobuyuki in charge of Iwabitsu Castle, further reinforcing eastern Kōzuke.

On July 10, Uesugi Kagekatsu invaded Northern Shinano. Masayuki sided with the Uesugi initially, but a couple of weeks later he defected to Hōjō's side. Both Uesugi and Hōjō's armies came to face each other at Kawanakajima on July 30, but direct combat was avoided as the Hōjō army turned back and advanced south towards Kai province, which was in turn invaded by Tokugawa forces. Meanwhile, one of Uesugi clan's major retainer, Shibata Shigeie, revolted and Uesugi's forces also had to turn back from Northern Shinano to deal with it.

On July 12 as the troops under Hōjō Ujinao advanced across Usui Pass, Nobushige resisted them, abandoned the Komoro Castle, and retreated to a fortress which he deemed more suitable to defend against the Hōjō army.

On October 19, Sanada Masayuki suddenly changed his allegiance again as now he helped the Tokugawa clan by attacking Nezu Masatsuna, a lieutenant of Hōjō Ujinao, and cooperating with Yoda Nobushige to resist the Hōjō clan forces around Komoro, as Ieyasu has instructed Masayuki. It was believed by historian that the Information about Masayuki's defection have reached the Hōjō clan in early October. In response for Masayuki betrayal, a commander of Hōjō forces named Fujita Ujikuni tried to capture Numata castle. However, he failed to do so as Masayuki resisted his attempt.

=== Conflict with Tokugawa ===
In 1583, Masayuki started the construction of Ueda Castle and the surrounding town. It became the headquarters of the Sanada clan in the following years.

In 1584, Tokugawa Ieyasu lead his army west towards Owari province in the Battle of Komaki and Nagakute against Hashiba Hideyoshi. Masayuki was left in northern Shinano to keep the Uesugi clan in check and took this opportunity to subjugate small, neighboring landlords and consolidate his power in the region. In December, as Ieyasu made peace with Hideyoshi and returned to his territory, he was pressed by Hōjō Ujinao to act on the terms of their treaty. In 1585, Masayuki moved their main bastion from Sanada-shi Yakata to Ueda Castle.

In that treaty, among other terms, Tokugawa Ieyasu agreed to transfer Numata Castle and its adjacent lands in Kōzuke province to the Hōjō clan. In April 1585, Ieyasu advanced his army into Kai province in a move to pressure Masayuki into abdicating Numata Castle. Masayuki however, resisted having to hand it over, having conquered it with great effort years before. Ultimately, he decided to cut relations with Tokugawa Ieyasu and once more switched allegiances by sending his second son Nobushige to Uesugi Kagekatsu as a hostage. With this move, he effectively joined Hashiba Hideyoshi's side, which opposed the Tokugawa-Hōjō alliance.

Months later, Tokugawa forces invaded Sanada clan's territory in northern Shinano province with 7,000 men and laid siege to Ueda Castle, which was defended by only 1,200 soldiers. However, Masayuki was able to inflict 1,300 casualties on Tokugawa's side and won a decisive victory. Meanwhile, Hōjō Ujinao attacked Numata Castle, but was also rebuffed by Sanada forces. This was the First Battle of Ueda Castle, a victory that earned Masayuki national prominence. Following this, Masayuki went from being just a former Takeda retainer to become recognized as an independent daimyō.

In 1586, after Ieyasu reconciled with Hideyoshi, He was given permission by Hideyoshi to attack Masayuki in Ueda. The reason of this allowance was because Masayuki did not even sent his family as hostages to Hideyoshi to symbolize his submission. However, as Masayuki immediately ask mediation of Kagekatsu to offer his surrender to the Toyotomi clan, Hideyoshi recalled Ieyasu to abort his invasion. Then Masayuki followed by personally came to Kyoto to offer his official submission to Hideyoshi.

=== Service under Toyotomi ===
Following his victory over the Tokugawa clan, Masayuki became a vassal to Toyotomi Hideyoshi. In doing so, he sent his son Nobushige (at the time a hostage to Uesugi clan) as a hostage to Osaka.

In 1586, the Hōjō clan tried to take Numata Castle once more, but again were repelled. Tokugawa forces also gathered and marched towards Ueda Castle again, but Toyotomi Hideyoshi interposed. At this point, Hideyoshi's political presence in Japan was too strong for the Tokugawa clan to oppose, and at his mediation, the attack was called off. However, he also designated Masayuki as a back-up power to the bigger Tokugawa forces in the region. This effectively meant that Masayuki now responded to Tokugawa Ieyasu in all military matters.

The following year, 1587, saw Masayuki travelling to Sunpu to meet with Tokugawa Ieyasu. Then, he went to Osaka to be received in audience by Toyotomi Hideyoshi, and thus formally become a vassal of the Toyotomi regime.

Two more years would pass until the dispute between the Sanada and Hōjō clans involving Numata Castle and adjacent areas would be mediated by Hideyoshi and resolved. In 1589, Hideyoshi decided the Sanada clan would relinquish all of its domain east of Tone River, including Numata Castle, to the Hōjō clan. In turn, he granted them some territory in southern Shinano. However, by the end of that year, Inomata Kuninori, a retainer from the Hōjō clan who was now holding Numata Castle, was deceived into attacking the nearby Nagurumi Castle, located west of Tone River and defended by Sanada forces. The attack was successful and the castle was seized by Hōjō forces, but by this time, Toyotomi Hideyoshi had sanctioned a rule which prohibited daimyōs from engaging in battle over private disputes. This incident fully breached this rule and it would go on to become the reason of the Siege of Odawara in 1590, and the subsequent fall of the Hōjō clan.

=== Sekigahara campaign ===
After Hideyoshi's death in 1598, Masayuki joined Ishida Mitsunari's side during the Battle of Sekigahara. Masayuki sent his eldest son, Nobuyuki, to the eastern side, while Masayuki and his second son, Yukimura, fought on the western side, a move that ensured the Sanada clan's survival.

Fortifying Ueda Castle, Masayuki and Yukimura fought against Tokugawa Hidetada's 38,000 men with only 2,000 soldiers. This was the Second Battle of Ueda Castle, and, whilst it was not exactly a victory, Masayuki was able to deliver a heavy blow to Hidetada and delay his forces for long enough that they were unable to show up at the main battlefield on time. However, the western side, led by Ishida Mitsunari, lost the main battle, and the victorious Tokugawa Ieyasu was able to redistribute fiefs at will. Masayuki and Yukimura were initially going to be executed, but, given Nobuyuki's participation in the eastern army, they were instead exiled to Kudoyama in Kii province. The Sanada clan was inherited by Sanada Nobuyuki.

During his time in exile, Masayuki received financial supports from Nobuyuki. According to the "Senko Jitsuroku" and other sources, he also received support from the Kishu Domain and Rengejoin Temple (Koyasan, Wakayama Prefecture), and was given 50 koku annually by the lord of the Kishu Domain, Asano Nagaakira. A letter from Masayuki dated January 5th, states that Masachika (Masayuki's third son) sent 20 ryo of the windfall of 40 ryo. (in 2021, 20 ryo is equivalent to about 2 million yen as 1 ryo is equal of 100,000 yen). On March 15, 1603 (Keicho 8), Masayuki also a letter to Shinkoji Temple (Ueda City, Nagano Prefecture) ("Shinkoji Documents") to ask Tokugawa Ieyasu to seek pardon through Honda Masanobu. In the postscript of the letter it is also written that Masayuki also felt grateful as Shinkoji Temple had sent him two momme (1,000 yen).

Sanada Masayuki died of an illness in Kudoyama in 1611.

== Legacy ==
Even though Masayuki was never able to expand his territories as well as other daimyōs, he is nevertheless often considered a talented daimyō, doomed by misfortune and the inconvenient terrains which surrounded his home domain. Toyotomi Hideyoshi had called Masayuki a person whose inside did not match his outside, that his allegiance was fickle and not to be trusted. Nevertheless, it was exactly his drifting alliances that helped the Sanada clan survive the onslaught of hostile clans, and, since the Edo period, he has been more extolled than vilified.

=== In popular culture ===
- Sanada Taiheiki 1985 TV series, played by Tetsuro Tamba.
- Sanada Maru NHK Taiga drama in 2016, played by Masao Kusakari.

=== Gallery ===
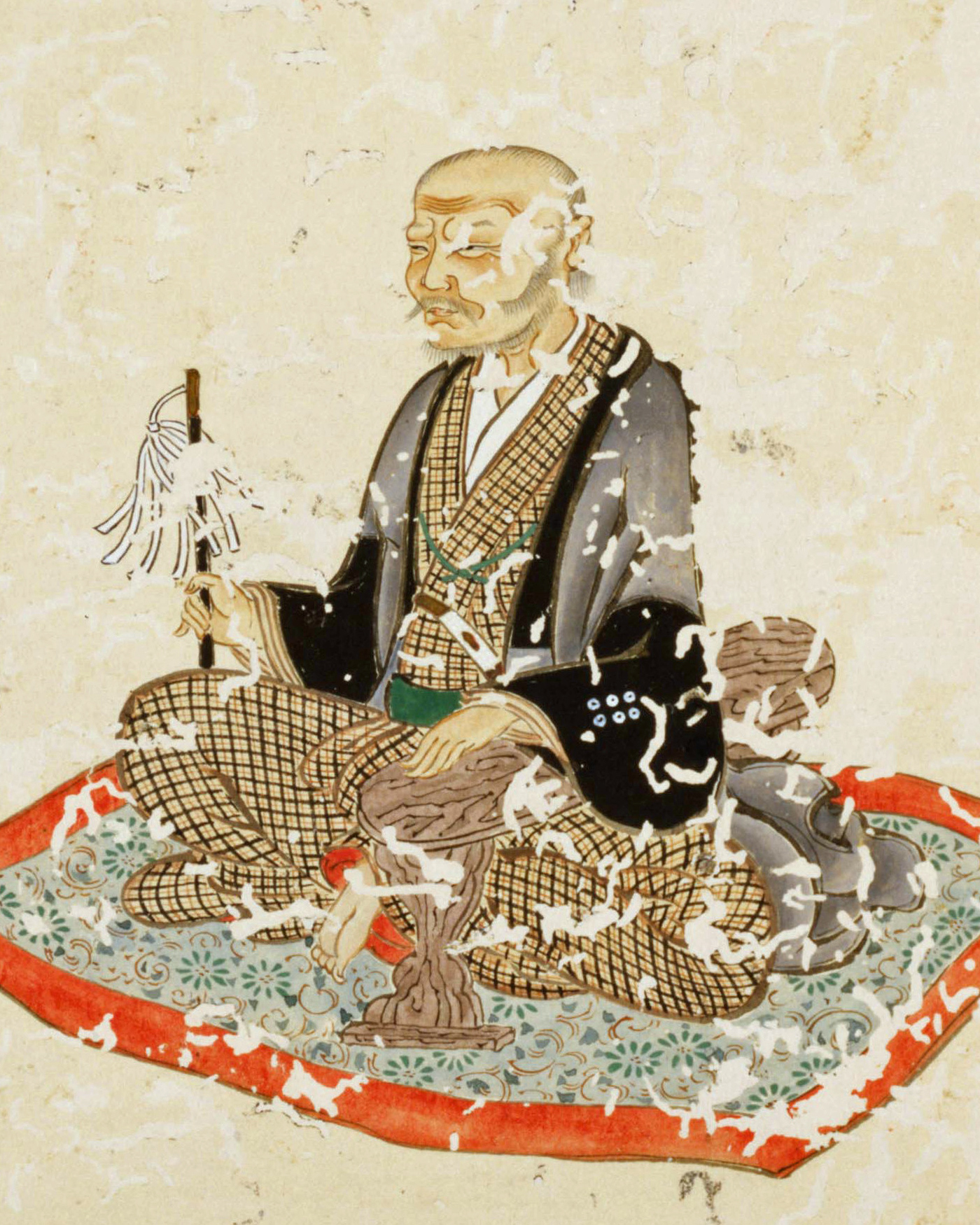
Portrait of Masayuki

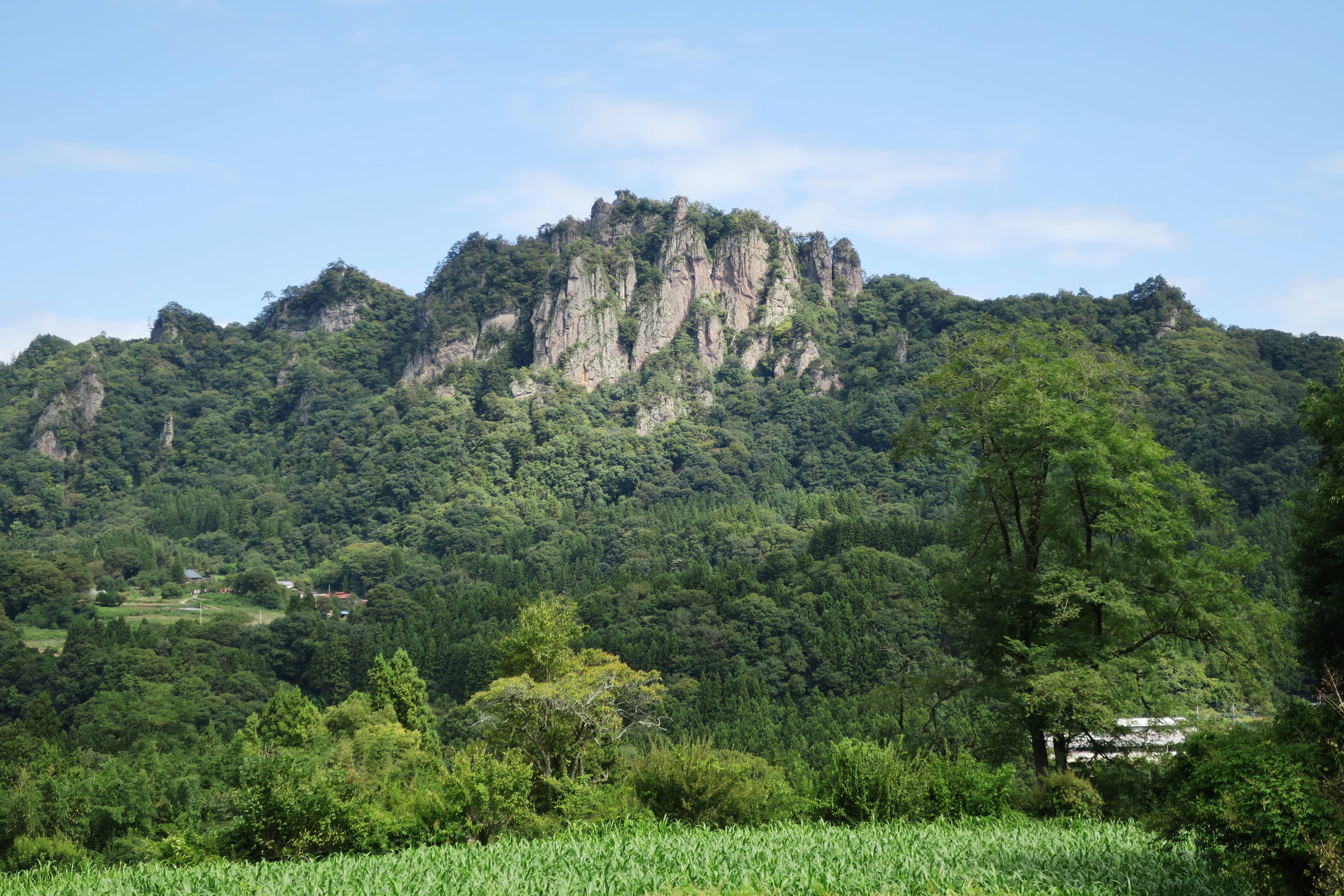
Iwabitsu mountain(Iwabitsu Castle)

== See also ==
- Sanada Nobuyuki
- Sanada Yukimura
- Samurai Warriors: Spirit of Sanada a hack and slash video game that focuses on the Sanada clan

== Appendix ==
=== Bibliography ===
- Hirayama, Yū (2011), 武田遺領をめぐる動乱と秀吉の野望 [Takeda's Territory and Hideyoshi's Ambitions], 戎光祥出版, ISBN 978-4-86403-035-9
- Hirayama, Yū (2015). 天正壬午の乱 [Tensho-Jingo war] (増補改訂版 ed.). 戎光祥出版. ISBN 978-4-86403-170-7.
- Shinichi, Saito (2005). 戦国時代の終焉. 中公新書 1809. 中央公論新社. ISBN 4121018095.
- Sansom, George (1961). A History of Japan: 1334–1615. Stanford, California: Stanford University Press. p. 325.
- Turnbull, Stephen (1998). The Samurai Sourcebook. London: Cassell & Co. p. 76.

Preceded by none	Daimyō of Ueda; 1585–1600	Succeeded by Sanada Nobuyuki
