= Sanada Nobuyuki =

Japanese samurai (1566–1658)

- 真田 信之
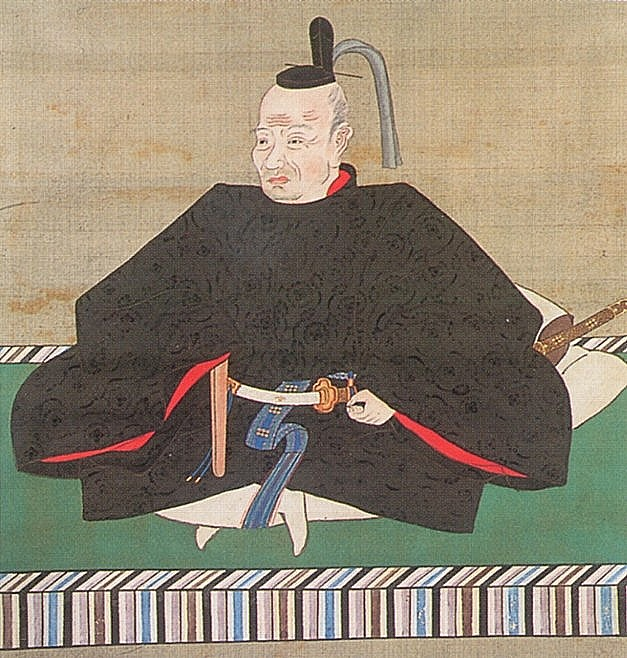

Head of Sanada clan
- In office 1600–1658
- Preceded by: Sanada Masayuki
- Succeeded by: Sanada Nobumasa

Lord of Matsushiro
- In office 1616–1656
- Preceded by: Sakai Tadakatsu
- Succeeded by: Sanada Nobumasa

Lord of Numata
- In office 1600–1656
- Succeeded by: Sanada Nobuyoshi

Lord of Ueda
- In office 1600–1622
- Succeeded by: Sengoku Tadamasa

Personal details
- Born: 1566
- Died: November 12, 1658 (aged 91–92)
- Spouse(s): Seiin-in; Komatsuhime
- Children: Manhime (b.1592); Sanada Nobuyoshi (1593-1634); Sanada Nobumasa (1597-1658); Sanada Nobushige (1599-1648); Dōkyō Etan (1642-1721)
- Parents: Sanada Masayuki (father); Kansho-in (mother)
- Relatives: Sanada Yukimura (brother); Sanada Nobutsuna (uncle and father-in-law); Honda Tadakatsu (father-in-law); Tokugawa Ieyasu (father-in-law)

Military service
- Allegiance: Takeda clan Oda clan Uesugi clan Later Hōjō clan Tokugawa clan Toyotomi clan Eastern Army; Tokugawa shogunate
- Unit: Sanada clan
- Battles/wars: Tenshō-Jingo war Battle of Kamigawa (1585); Siege of Odawara (1590); Battle of Sekigahara (1600); Siege of Osaka (1614-1615)

Sanada Nobuyuki (真田 信之; 1566 – November 12, 1658) was a Japanese samurai of the Sengoku period. He was the son of daimyō Sanada Masayuki and the older brother of Sanada Yukimura.

== Early life ==
He was the first son of Sanada Masayuki and his wife, Kansho-in. His younger brother was Sanada Yukimura. He was married to Komatsuhime (Inahime), Honda Tadakatsu's daughter and adopted daughter of Tokugawa Ieyasu.

Two other wives of Nobuyuki were his first wife and cousin Seiin-in, who lost her status to Komatsuhime and Ukyo (a daughter of Tamagawa Hidemasa).

At an early age, Nobuyuki's father served under the daimyō Takeda Shingen and his son Takeda Katsuyori and sent Nobuyuki as a hostage to prove the Sanada clan's loyalty to the Takeda clan. After the Takeda clan was destroyed by Oda and Tokugawa army, Nobuyuki fled to Ueda Castle, the stronghold of the Sanada Clan and where his family were.

In 1582, Later, Nobuyuki participated in the Tenshō-Jingo war. At first, Nobuyuki and his father allied with the Hojo clan. However, at the urging of Yoda Nobutada, a Takeda retainer who had loyally served Tokugawa Ieyasu , and his uncle, Sanada Nobutada, Nobuyuki recaptured Numata Castle from the Hojo forces.

In 1585, Tokugawa Ieyasu attacked Ueda Castle; Nobuyuki fought in Battle of Kami river alongside his father and was victorious. Later, as Masayuki served under Toyotomi Hideyoshi, Nobuyuki was sent to Tokugawa to be a retainer in order to preserve the clan if anything wrong happened to the Toyotomi clan.

== Battle of Sekigahara ==
Edo period screen depicting the Battle of Sekigahara.

During the Battle of Sekigahara, he fought on the side of Tokugawa Ieyasu (Eastern Army), against whom Masayuki and his brother, Yukimura were fighting. After the Western Army was defeated by Ieyasu, Nobuyuki used this position to save his father's and brother's lives.

After the battle, Masayuki's territory was seized, Masayuki and Yukimura were exiled to Kudoyama in Mt. Koya in the Kii Province. Ueda was given to Nobuyuki.

== Siege of Osaka ==
In 1614, the relationship between the Tokugawa and Toyotomi started heating up again. Ieyasu ordered an army of 10,000 to surround Osaka Castle, base of Toyotomi clan.

Yukimura escaped from Kudoyama and served Toyotomi to take the fight against the Tokugawa. Accepting the truth, Nobuyuki couldn't spare Sanada Yukimura again and his brother was killed in battle.

After the Siege of Osaka, Tokugawa generally had a high regard for Nobuyuki. In 1622, he became the first lord of the Matsushiro Domain and lived to 92 years of age.

== Honours ==
- Junior Fifth Rank

== See also ==
- Sanada Taiheiki a Japanese drama
- Sanada Maru a Japanese drama
- Samurai Warriors: Spirit of Sanada a hack and slash video game that focuses on the Sanada clan

Preceded by Sanada Masayuki	2nd Daimyō of Ueda (Sanada); 1600–1622	Succeeded by Sengoku Tadamasa
Preceded by none	First Daimyō of Numata (Sanada); 1600–1616	Succeeded by Sanada Nobuyoshi
Preceded by Sakai Tadakatsu	First Daimyō of Matsushiro (Sanada); 1616–1656	Succeeded by Sanada Nobumasa
