= Sanada Nobutsuna =

Japanese samurai (1537–1575)

- 真田 信綱

Head of Sanada clan
- In office 1574–1575
- Preceded by: Sanada Yukitaka
- Succeeded by: Sanada Masayuki

Personal details
- Born: 1537
- Died: June 29, 1575 (aged 37–38) Battle of Nagashino
- Children: Seiin-in
- Parent: Sanada Yukitaka (father)
- Relatives: Sanada Masateru (brother); Sanada Masayuki (brother); Sanada Nobuyuki (nephew and son-in-law); Sanada Yukimura (nephew)

Military service
- Allegiance: Takeda clan
- Unit: Sanada clan
- Battles/wars: Battle of Kawanakajima (1561); Siege of Odawara (1569); Battle of Mikatagahara (1573); Battle of Nagashino (1575)

Sanada Nobutsuna (真田 信綱; 1537 – June 29, 1575) was a Japanese samurai of the Sengoku period. He is known as one of the "Twenty-Four Generals of Takeda Shingen".

He was the eldest son of Sanada Yukitaka, a castle lord in Shinano Province, who by the time of his son's coming-of-age, had pledged his loyalty to the Takeda. During his coming-of-age ceremony, therefore, Sanada Nobutsuna was granted the shin (信) character from Takeda Shingen's name and took the name of Nobutsuna (信綱).

During the Battle of Nagashino in 1575, Nobutsuna was killed in combat his younger brother Masateru was also killed. According to Shinchō Kōki, Nobutsuna served as a member of the rearguard in the retreat and was killed.

After Nobutsuna's death his younger brother, Masayuki took the clan leadership. Nobutsuna's daughter Seiin-in was Sanada Nobuyuki (Masayuki's elder son)'s first wife.
