= Sanada Yukitaka =

Japanese samurai

- 真田 幸隆
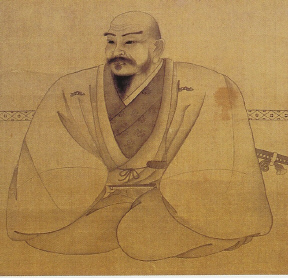

Head of Sanada clan
- Preceded by: Sanada Yukiyoshi
- Succeeded by: Sanada Nobutsuna

Personal details
- Born: c. 1512
- Died: June 8, 1574 (aged 61–62)
- Spouse: Kyō'un-in
- Children: Sanada Nobutsuna; Sanada Masateru; Sanada Masayuki

Military service
- Allegiance: Takeda clan
- Unit: Sanada clan
- Battles/wars: Battle of Odaihara (1547); Siege of Toishi (1550); Battles of Kawanakajima (1553-1564); Siege of Odawara (1569); Battle of Mikatagahara (1573)

Sanada Yukitaka (真田 幸隆; c. 1512 – June 8, 1574) was a Japanese samurai warrior of the Sengoku period. He is known as one of the "Twenty-Four Generals of Takeda Shingen". He was the father of Sanada Nobutsuna and Sanada Masayuki and grandfather of the legendary samurai warrior Sanada Yukimura, who served the Toyotomi clan.

Yukitaka was one of three "Danjo" generals to be named Danjōchū (Danjō stands for a formal title, Danjōchū; 弾正忠) by Shingen, along with Kōsaka Masanobu and Hoshina Masatoshi.

In 1541, Takeda Nobutora, the Suwa clan and Murakami Yoshikiyo cooperatively attacked the Unno clan and their relatives at the Battle of Unnodaira. The Unno clan, including the Sanada clan, left Shinano province, and their territory was divided among the invaders. After this battle, Takeda Shingen expelled his father Takeda Nobutora and became the new leader of the Takeda clan. A few years later, Yukitaka became a vassal of Takeda Shingen.

Under Shingen, Yukitaka participated in the Battle of Odaihara in 1547 and the sieges of Toishi in 1550 and 1551. After the conquest of Toishi, Yukitaka and the Sanada clan restored their old territory in Shinano.

Throughout his life, Yukitaka contributed to the expansion of the Takeda clan's domains.
