= Sanada clan =

Japanese clan

Sanada clan 真田氏
- The emblem (Rokumonsen) of the Sanada clan
- Home province: Matsushiro Domain
- Parent house: Unno clan
- Titles: Count; Baron
- Founder: Sanada Yukitaka
- Founding year: 16th century
- Dissolution: still extant

The Sanada clan (真田氏, Sanada-shi) is a Japanese clan. The Sanada were long associated with Matsushiro Domain in modern-day Nagano (city), Nagano Prefecture.

== History ==
The Sanada clan claimed descent from the Seiwa Genji. Historically, the clan's banner was established by Unno Yukiyoshi in the early 16th century. He emblazoned the Rokumonsen on his banner. The Sanada were key vassals in the Takeda army, with three famous generals being Sanada Yukitaka and his sons Sanada Nobutsuna, Sanada Masateru, and Sanada Masayuki.

Sanada Yukitaka, son of Unno Munetsuna, established the clan and its name at the beginning of the 16th century.

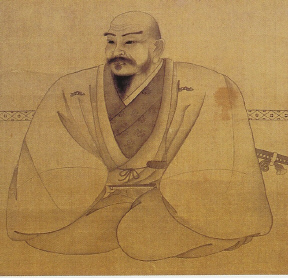
Sanada Yukitaka

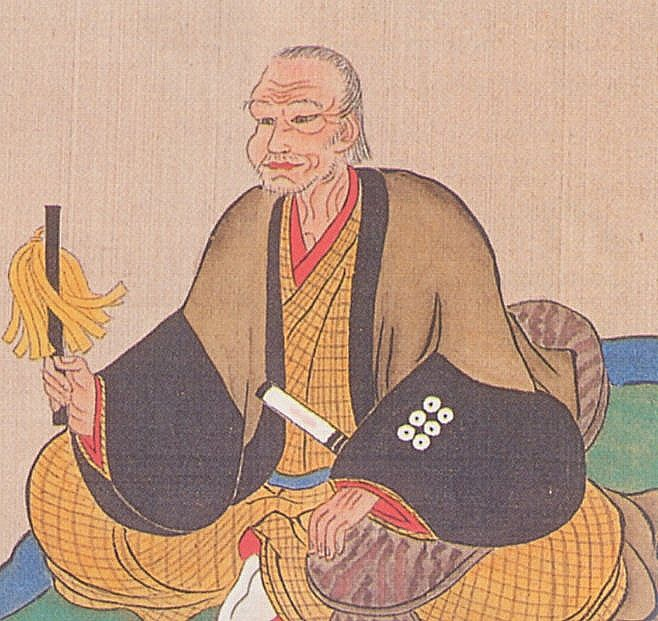
Sanada Masayuki

In the Sengoku period, Sanada Masayuki (1547–1611) led the clan. His second son Sanada Yukimura (1567–1615) was sent as a hostage to the Toyotomi clan in 1587. In 1594, he married Chikurin-in, an adopted daughter of Toyotomi Hideyoshi; therefore, he was officially Hideyoshi's son-in-law.

In 1600, at the Battle of Sekigahara, Yukimura sided with the Western army. He fought against Tokugawa Hidetada at Ueda Castle, successfully delaying him from reaching Sekigahara with 38,000 reinforcements. He opposed the Tokugawa again at the Battle of Osaka where he died.

=== Edo era ===
Sanada Nobuyuki (1566–1658) was the oldest son of Masayuki. In 1587 he married Komatsuhime, an adopted daughter of Tokugawa Ieyasu. Therefore he was officially Ieyasu's son-in-law. In 1600, he sided with the Eastern army. He was given control of Ueda Domain in Shinano Province and Numata Domain in Kōzuke Province with revenues of 65,000 koku. In 1622, Nobuyuki was transferred to Matsushiro Domain (100,000 koku) in Shinano. His descendants remained there until the Meiji Restoration in 1868.

Sanada clan forces took part in the attack on Aizu in 1868, on the side of the imperial army, but refused to take charge of Aizu prisoners of war.

=== Modern era ===
In 1871, the former daimyō was made a count in the kazoku peerage system. The head of a cadet branch of the clan was given the title of baron.

The Meiji-era ornithologist Yukiyasu Kiyosu was the son of Sanada Yukitami, the last lord of Matsushiro.

== Family heads ==
1. Sanada Yukiyoshi (Unno)
2. Sanada Yukitaka (幸隆)
3. Sanada Nobutsuna
4. Sanada Masayuki
5. Sanada Nobuyuki
6. Sanada Nobumasa
7. Sanada Yukimichi
8. Sanada Nobuhiro
9. Sanada Nobuyasu
10. Sanada Yukihiro
11. Sanada Yukitaka (幸専)
12. Sanada Yukitsura
13. Sanada Yukinori
14. Sanada Yukimoto

== Notable members ==
- Sanada Yukitaka (真田 幸隆, 1512–1574)
- Sanada Nobutsuna (真田 信綱, 1537–1575)
- Sanada Masateru (真田 昌輝, d. 1575)
- Sanada Masayuki (真田 昌幸, 1547–1611)
- Sanada Nobuyuki (真田 信之, 1566–1658)
  - Komatsuhime (小松姫, 1573–1620)
- Sanada Yukimura (真田 幸村, 1567–1615) also known as Sanada Nobushige (真田 信繁)
  - Chikurin-in (竹林院, 1579–1649)
- Sanada Nobuyoshi (真田 信吉, 1593–1634)
- Sanada Nobumasa (真田 信政, 1597–1658)
- Sanada Yukimasa (真田 幸昌, 1600–1615) also known as Sanada Daisuke (真田 大助)
- Sanada Morinobu (真田 守信, 1612–1671) also known as Sanada Daihachi (真田 大八)

== Notable retainers ==
- Sakuma Shōzan 佐久間象山 (1811–1864)
- Hayashi Sanada (sometimes spelled Hayashi Sanda) 真田林 (1803–1842)

== Television ==
NHK Television in Japan will be airing an annual Taiga broadcast about the Sengoku Jidai. This time (2016) it is the Sanada Maru.
