= Gen Sekine =

Japanese serial killer

- Born: January 2, 1942; Chichibu, Saitama Prefecture, Japan
- Died: March 27, 2017 (aged 75); Tokyo Detention House, Tokyo, Japan
- Conviction: Murder (4 counts)
- Penalty: Death

Details
- Victims: 4–7+
- Span of crimes: April – August 1993
- Country: Japan
- State: Saitama
- Date apprehended: January 5, 1995

Gen Sekine (関根元, Sekine Gen; 2 January 1942 – 27 March 2017) was a Japanese dog breeder and serial killer who, together with his common-law wife Hiroko Kazama (風間博子), murdered at least four clients in Kumagaya, Saitama Prefecture, between April and August 1993. Both were sentenced to death for their crimes, but Sekine died on death row prior to execution.

== Early life and accomplices ==
=== Gen Sekine ===
Gen Sekine was born on 2 January 1942 in Chichibu, Saitama Prefecture. After graduating high school, he worked at a pachinko parlor and later a Chinese restaurant in his hometown. One night, the restaurant burned down in a mysterious fire that also killed its owner; rumours persisted that Sekine had killed the owner and set the fire to cover his tracks, but this was never proven. When he was in his twenties, Sekine started breeding dogs, later earning celebrity status in the industry for popularizing the Alaskan Malamute breed in Japan. Some sources claim that Sekine was also responsible for popular interest in Siberian Huskies.

Sekine originally ran a pet shop and animal leasing business in Chichibu. However, he gained notoriety for malicious business practices, often stealing dogs and selling them to customers, or killing the customer's dog and selling them an entirely new one. Local residents also complained that he looked after dangerous animals such as tigers and lions. Due to growing tensions with local yakuza, Sekine temporarily moved to Itō, Shizuoka Prefecture. He returned to Saitama Prefecture in 1982 and opened the "Africa Kennel" in Kumagaya.

Sekine was adept at predicting human behavior, and many were thus drawn to his unique humor and speaking skills. On the other hand, many of Sekine's peers avoided involving themselves too deeply with him due to his business practices, propensity to threaten customers and his friendship with local yakuza. In addition, Sekine was a pathological liar who made many boastful claims to not only acquaintances and customers, but also to media interviewers with the aim of advertising his store. One such lie concerned his missing little finger, which he claimed had been bitten off by a lion in Africa; in reality, it had been cut off by members of the yakuza for failing to pay debts.

According to accomplice Eikō Yamazaki, Sekine followed a set of five rules which he called his "murder philosophy":

- 1. Kill those who are not good for the world
- 2. Do not kill for insurance purposes, as you will get caught
- 3. Kill the greedy
- 4. It is important not to shed blood
- 5. The most important thing is to make the body disappear

Yamazaki further claimed that Sekine often bragged in private about committing the perfect crime, that he would never get caught and "if there was an Olympic event for killing, [he] would get the gold medal." Despite his enthusiastic and boastful attitude, Sekine was often described as small-minded and nervous, which was reflected with his obsession to constantly get rid of any incriminating evidence. Yamazaki said that while he was always frightened, Sekine was confident that he would never be caught.

=== Hiroko Kazama ===
Hiroko Kazama was born on February 19, 1957, in Kumagaya. She was raised by her father, a childcare worker and later a real estate agent. A quiet but strong woman who loved big dogs, Kazama was studying to work as a land surveyor to help her father financially. In 1983, she visited the Africa Kennel where she met Sekine, and the pair married not long after.

Both partners had been previously married (Sekine having married three times before; Kazama was divorced with two children), so in order to show her devotion for him, Kazama carved a dragon tattoo on her back as a sign of their unity, as opposed to his previous wives, who had tattooed his name. Some theories suggest that Sekine had married Kazama due to her rich father's inheritance, while others suggest it was for her ability to present herself at dog shows and manage the kennel's finances. While both spouses engaged in infidelity, prompted by Sekine physically abusing Kazama and her children, they nevertheless supported each other in overseeing their business.

In order to prevent Sekine from wasting money, Kazama faked their divorce and started living as his common-law wife, which allowed for her to be appointed the president of the Africa Kennel. While on the surface it appeared to be a joint-stock agreement, the actual management was supervised by Sekine, while Kazama dealt exclusively with the finances.

=== Eikō Yamazaki ===
Eikō Yamazaki was born in Toyama Prefecture in January 1956. A bulldog breeder living out of a remodeled freight car in Katashina, Gunma Prefecture, he first heard of Sekine after seeing him participate in a dog show. When he visited the Africa Kennel to learn about Sekine's management philosophy, he was unexpectedly invited to work there as an executive. However, in reality, Yamazaki became Sekine's driver and unwilling accomplice.

== Murders ==
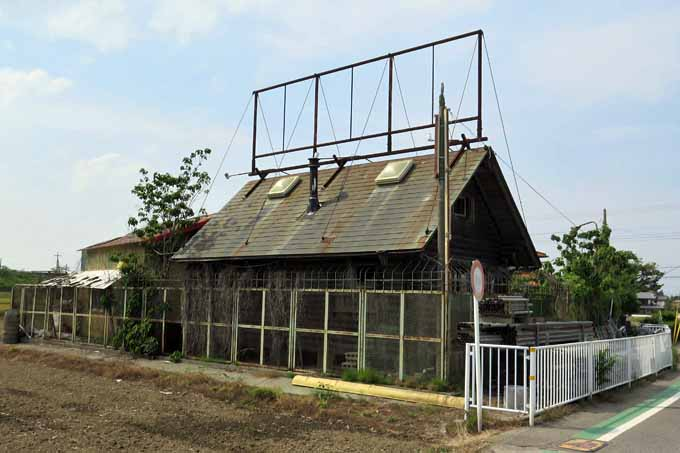
The former site of the Africa Kennel

Sekine's modus operandi consisted of dismembering the victims' corpses, which he called "making the body disappear." All four of his known victims were dismembered in Yamazaki's bathroom, and their bones, skin, tissues and internal organs were cut down to several centimeters. The bones were then incinerated in drums, along with clothing and personal items, the ashes of which were then disposed in forests and rivers. Sekine also devised to burn the body themselves, but as he knew it would generate an unpleasant and easily noticeable odor, he burned them until only the bones were left, then checked to make sure that there was no leftover flesh. When conducting this procedure, Yamazaki claimed that Sekine found it "interesting and fun."

=== Akio Kawasaki ===
Akio Kawasaki, a 39-year-old executive of an industrial waste treatment company in Gyōda, befriended Sekine after visiting the Africa Kennel to buy a dog. At the time, Kawasaki was inclined by his brother to expand his business ventures into dog breeding, and so purchased two Rhodesian Ridgebacks for ¥11 million. However, Kawasaki was later informed by an acquaintance that the market price for such dogs was much lower, and that both dogs were too old and unsuited for breeding. The female dog later escaped, rendering breeding impossible, causing an angered Kawasaki to return the male dog and ask for a refund. At the time, the Africa Kennel was in dire financial straits, prompting Sekine and Kazama to kill Kawasaki to avoid giving the money back.

On the evening of 20 April 1993, Kawasaki was invited to chat with Sekine in his station wagon, where he was served a drink laced with cyanide and was killed instantly. When Yamazaki returned to the garage, Sekine showed him the body and threatened to kill him if he ratted him out. He then started dismembering Kawasaki's body, ordering Yamazaki to dispose of his car in Tokyo with Kazama's help. The scene was staged to make it look as if the executive had disappeared, with the accomplices making sure that the car's numberplate was recorded on the ANPR.

After parting with Kazama in Kumagaya, Yamazaki returned to his domicile in Katashina. The next morning, Sekine presented him with drums containing Kawasaki's charred remains and belongings to be disposed of. As demanded, Yamazaki disposed of the body parts in the Usune River in Kawaba and of the burnt bones, ashes and personal items in Oze National Park.

=== Yasutoshi Endo and Susumu Wakui ===
Yasutoshi Endo was the leader of a criminal group affiliated with the Inagawa-kai yakuza clan, who acted as a supervisor of Sekine and was also a customer of the Africa Kennel. Suspecting Sekine's role in Kawasaki's disappearance, Endo began to extort him for a large amount of money. Eventually Sekine and Kazama, worried that these demands would jeopardize plans to expand their business, decided to eliminate Endo and his chauffeur, Susumu Wakui, the latter of whom had no prior interactions with the couple.

On the night of 21 July 1993, Sekine, Kazama and Yamazaki drove to a location designated by Endo. Sekine and Kazama left the car to meet Endo, while Yamazaki stayed inside. The couple pretended to comply with the gangster's demands and handed over a resignation certificate, and supplied drinks laced with strychnine to both Endo and Wakui. Endo collapsed shortly afterwards, but Wakui somehow resisted the effects of the poison. Sekine and Kazama told him to call an ambulance to save time, letting him run around the area searching for help. After that, the couple got into the car, put Wakui on the front seat and let Yamazaki leave on the pretext of looking after Endo. While driving on a deserted road along the Arakawa embankment, Wakui began convulsing violently, enough to crack the car's windshield, before dying.

After returning to pick up Endo's body, the trio took two cars and drove towards Katashina in separate directions. The men's bodies were dismembered in Yamazaki's bathroom, with Yamazaki sharpening the knives while Sekine and Kazama performed the dismemberment. Yamazaki later claimed that Sekine had threatened to dispose of him in the same manner if he told anyone, while Kazama hummed enka songs. After the couple finished the dismemberment, Kazama returned to Kumagaya while Sekine and Yamazaki were left behind to incinerate the bones and clothing. The remains and ashes were then thrown into the Usune, Nuri and Katashina rivers.

=== Mitsue Sekiguchi ===
Mitsue Sekiguchi, a housewife from Gyōda, began an affair with Sekine when her second son started working at the Africa Kennel. However, because the store was having financial difficulties due to Endo's extortion and the construction of a new kennel, Sekine pleaded with Sekiguchi to become a shareholder of the business. Sekine initially planned to only steal the money, but realized that the shareholder lie would be revealed eventually; if that happened, not only would the investments have to be returned, but the money paid for six Alaskan Malamutes, amounting to ¥9 million. This, coupled with the fact that he was becoming annoyed with Sekiguchi, prompted Sekine to kill her.

On the afternoon of 26 August 1993, while driving around Gyōda, Sekine killed Sekiguchi with strychnine and proceeded to steal ¥2.7 million from her. According to Yamazaki, Sekine dismembered her remains like his previous victims, but unlike them he committed sexual acts on the corpse before doing so. Early next morning, Sekiguchi's burned remains were thrown in the Nuri River.

Sekine is believed to have committed this murder entirely of his own accord, as nothing indicated Yamazaki knew the victim prior to her death. There were suspicions that Kazama might have been involved, but as all evidence to this theory is circumstantial, she was not charged with the killing.

== Investigation and arrests ==
On the day after his disappearance, Kawasaki's family filed a missing persons report to Gyōda police. At first they theorised that Kawasaki had simply run away, but after his car was discovered in Tokyo an investigation was launched. Interviews with family members revealed Kawasaki's disputes with Sekine, who had been the subject of rumours concerning earlier disappearances. Police began monitoring Sekine and Yamazaki, and eventually linked Kawasaki's disappearance with those of Endo, Wakui and Sekiguchi. Unable to arrest Sekine for the murders due to insufficient evidence, the Second Investigation Division considered arresting him on fraud charges relating to the construction of the new kennel; the idea was ultimately abandoned.

On 26 January 1994, serial killer Yoshinori Ueda was arrested for murdering several dog breeders in Osaka. Although unrelated to the case, rumors spread that similar cases were occurring in Saitama Prefecture, and in mid-February, the media focused their attention on the Africa Kennel on a daily basis. While Sekine insisted on his innocence, the victims' families continued to accuse him. However, since police had no evidence at this time, their accusations were considered baseless.

On 22 September, the Saitama Prefectural Police arrested an acquaintance of Sekine, a former Japan Ground Self-Defense Force (JGSDF) officer from Ōmama, on unrelated fraud charges. It was suggested by the media that the man might have known something about Sekine, and during his interrogation, the acquaintance admitted to being somewhat involved in earlier disappearances and hinted at Sekine's responsibility for the more recent cases. Yamazaki was questioned by police on 17 October, but he denied any involvement. After he fled with his second wife, police issued an arrest warrant for her on charges of embezzling ¥50 million from a construction company. Yamazaki's wife was arrested, and Yamazaki himself later agreed to an interview with investigators. His interrogation resumed on 3 December, and he eventually confessed that he was involved in the murders. Ten days later, Yamazaki guided investigators to Katashina, where he indicated the location of Kawasaki's remains. As a result, Sekine and Kazama were arrested on murder and concealment of a corpse on 5 January 1995, with Yamazaki following three days later on the same charges.

=== Search for physical evidence ===
From January to February 1995, acting upon Yamazaki's confessions, the Saitama and Gunma police forces conducted a joint search centered around Kumagaya and Katashina. During the search, they covered many locations, such as Kumagaya, Katashina, Kawaba, Shirasawa, Tone, Gangnam, Kawagoe, Niiza and others.

As a result, bone and teeth fragments, amulets, watches and other items were found in Oze National Forest, while additional unburned bone fragments, mobile phones, house and car keys, and dentures were found in the Nuri River. Due to the fact some of the bones were burned at high temperatures, DNA testing was rendered impossible, but authorities managed to identify victims through the disposed personal items. A large number of investigators searched the river to locate the objects, finding many belongings that would serve as material evidence later on. A similar situation was reported in Gunma Prefecture, where an investigator reported discovering discarded metal objects that had been there for as long as two years.

== Trials ==
In addition to the extremely scant physical evidence, the subsequent criminal trial was prolonged due to Sekine and Kazama blaming each other for the killings, while the prosecution argued that all three parties were equally to blame. In addition, Yamazaki, who had given full confessions at the investigation stage, had cooperated willingly and had even struck a plea deal with prosecutors, refused to testify at the trial stage.

=== Initial trial ===
On 7 July 1995, Yamazaki's trial was held at Urawa District Court (present-day Saitama District Court), and the facts of the indictment were generally acknowledged. Subsequently, on 24 July, Sekine and Kazama were brought to trial in the same court, with the former pleading no contest. Sekine's lawyer criticized the prosecution for not disclosing evidence or affidavits, Kazama claimed that she was not involved in the murders or dismemberments, stating that Sekine had coerced her into disposing of the evidence after the fact. In the Kawasaki case, Kazama admitted that she had driven his car to Tokyo with Yamazaki but denied knowing that it was his or why she was doing it in the first place.

On 6 October, at Yamazaki's third court hearing, he testified to confessing due to an agreement with the prosecution, but at his co-defendants' trial, he refused to testify. Yamazaki claimed this was due to the Urawa District Prosecutor going back on his word to release him if he gave enough evidence. He also revealed that he had negotiated to have his wife released on bail. The Urawa District Prosecutor's Office said at a press conference that the bail had been carried out through due process, denying the existence of any agreement. Afterwards, Sekine and Kazama's defense counsel argued that Yamazaki could not be considered a reliable witness due to his judicial transactions. When the prosecutor in charge of keeping Yamazaki as a witness appeared at trial on 19 July 1995, he admitted to allowing him to meet his wife, but continued to deny making an agreement with the accused.

On 2 November, with the participation of judges, prosecutors and lawyers, the Katashina crime scene was explored for verification. Fifteen days later, the prosecutor's office demanded a three-year prison term for Yamazaki; in response, his defense counsel pleaded to a lesser sentence, and because of this, he was acquitted and given a suspended sentence. Yamazaki appeared as a witness in the main trial on 20 November. A cross-examination was conducted, but as declared previously, he refused to testify, and in subsequent appearances he criticized the prosecution, police and judges. Prosecutors initially planned to have Yamazaki as a key witness but resorted to the affidavits at the investigations stage in the end. On 15 December, Yamazaki was sentenced to three years' imprisonment for his participation in the murders. While it was acknowledged that he was coerced, it was pointed out that he was not physically abused or kept under surveillance, was only verbally threatened, had many chances to contact authorities and participated in the crimes of his own initiative. Yamazaki later appealed the sentence to the Tokyo High Court, but it was dismissed. He served his sentence in full.

On 3 September 1998, when asked a question at his trial, Sekine, who until then had neither denied or admitted responsibility, finally confessed to being involved. However, he claimed that the murders were masterminded by Kazama and that Yamazaki had killed the victims, while he had only participated in order to protect his wife. Following these statements, the couple constantly confronted each other.

On 6 July 2000, the prosecutor's office demanded the death penalty for both Sekine and Kazawa. Closing arguments were held for four consecutive days from 10 and 14 October 10, with Sekine pleading for life imprisonment while Kazama asked to be found not guilty. Approximately five years since the trial began, after a total of 105 court sessions, the defendants were convicted. The Urawa District Court sentenced Sekine and Kazama to death on 21 March 2001. In the final statements, the judges scrutinized the convicts' statements as conflicting and intricate, and pointed out that even if there were secret agreements between Yamazaki and prosecutors, Sekine's confession included facts which only the perpetrator could have known. As such, even if there were certain falsehoods or exaggerations, Yamazaki's confession would still be considered credible.

The former couple eventually admitted to killing three of the victims besides Endo, who they claimed had been strangled by Yamazaki. However, no discernible motive or incentive could be found in this claim, and this was quickly rejected. Concerning the Kawasaki and Wakui cases, while it was acknowledged that Sekine was the principal mastermind and murderer, it was also noted that Kazama willingly offered to participate in both crimes and was thus held equally as responsible. When it came to the Sekiguchi killing, no conclusive evidence could link her to this crime and Sekine is considered solely responsible, but the fact that the former claimed the latter masterminded the whole idea and that the possibility of an accomplice was not impossible, this possibility was taken into consideration during the judgment.

=== Appeal trial ===
On 5 December 2003, the couple's first appeal was heard at the Tokyo High Court, with their defense alleging that there were factual inaccuracies in the first trial. After his release, Yamazaki was brought as a witness, but his testimony was considered ambiguous, except for criticizing the prosecutors, defense counsel and the legal system. Peculiarly, he also testified in Kazama's defense for some time, but has not given a clear reason as to why. On 14 February 2005, Kazama admitted to a degree that she was involved in dismembering the bodies of Endo and Wakui, and on 11 July the Tokyo High Court dismissed their appeal. Both later appealed to the Supreme Court of Japan, but on 5 June 2009, Justice Yuki Furuta dismissed their appeal, and on 22 June their death sentences were finalized.

== Possible additional murders ==
In 1984, at least three men and women connected to Sekine disappeared in Chichibu and the surrounding areas. Saitama Prefectural Police searched for their bodies, but none were ever located. In addition to these, there have been suggestions that other disappearances and suspicious deaths might have been Sekine's doing, but only the following three were reported on in the Japanese press:

- 11 February 1984: a Chichibu yakuza disappeared without a trace. Sekine's older brother owned debts to the man, and after Sekine had married to Kazama he offered to pay him off, but the yakuza refused to cooperate. On the day of his disappearance, the victim went out to pick up a mysterious man in his car and was never seen again. According to people he knew, he claimed that a "huge amount of money [would] arrive shortly."
- 8 May 1984: a truck driver and former clerk at the Africa Kennel disappeared. Since Sekine had replaced a signboard that the man had previously placed, he contacted him and demanded that he be repaid for his wasted effort. He then received a phone call from Sekine at a nearby gas station, was instructed to meet him at an unknown location and vanished soon after.
- June 1984: a female snack bar owner, the wife of a former JGSDF officer living in Fukaya, disappeared. The couple often argued about money, as her husband had sold her luxury foreign cars without permission, and the woman soon disappeared. According to the officer's claims, he beat her to death during a quarrel and later asked Sekine to help dispose of the body. Even if his claims are confirmed in the future, since the crime can be considered manslaughter and not murder, neither man can be charged with it as the statute of limitations has expired.

The former JGSDF officer also claimed that he had helped dismember and dispose of the previous victims' corpses. Based on his statements, a search was conducted in April 1995. However, taking into account that eleven years had passed by then, the search was further complicated by the fact that the riverbed had been dried up after the demolition of a bridge in 1991. Authorities also inspected the old kennel in Kumagaya, where the officer claimed the bodies were dismembered, but nothing of note was found. Despite this, Kazama hinted in court about the missing yakuza, suggesting that she at very least knew about the case.

Yamazaki later speculated that Sekine had killed others before, judging from his expertise and dexterity at dismembering the bodies. In a book giving his account of the case, he noted that the yakuza and the truck driver who had disappeared in 1984 were friends of Sekine, and that the latter had a weird ritual of wrapping "venison" around bamboo sticks. He also said that Sekine had once told him that he belonged to the Takada Group, an organized crime group affiliated with the Inagawa-kai.

== Sekine's death ==
After their convictions, both Sekine and Kazawa were sent to await execution at the Tokyo Detention House. In November 2016, Sekine fell ill and had to be rushed for treatment in the prison hospital. He died of multiple organ failure on the morning of 27 March 2017, aged 75.

== Aftermath ==
The Africa Kennel closed after the case broke. The buildings which housed the business have not been demolished, however, and remain standing in Kumagaya.

After his release, Yamazaki appeared on a 2001 episode of the TV program Off Record! shortly after the discovery of an amulet, thought to be Kawasaki's, depicting a daikokuten.

Kazama, who remains on death row, continues to assert her innocence, a claim supported by Yamazaki, who in turn says that Sekine had coerced them both into committing the crimes.

In May 2026, Kazama filed a lawsuit against the Japanese government, arguing that her 24/7 surveillance inside a small death row prison cell amounts to a violation of her privacy. She added that male guards are not banned from monitoring female death row inmates and that her human dignity has been "seriously undermined." Kazama is the first female death row prisoner to sue the government.

== See also ==
- List of serial killers by country
- The 2010 film Cold Fish, directed by Sion Sono, was loosely based on the case.

== Bibliography ==
- Shima Nagayuki (pseudonym of Eikō Yamazaki) (January 9, 2000). 愛犬家連続殺人 [The Saitama Dog Lover Murders] (in Japanese). Kadokawa Shoten. ISBN 4043553013.
- Keiichi Hasumi (January 12, 2003). 悪魔を憐れむ歌 [Sympathy for the Devil] (in Japanese). Gentosha. ISBN 434400440X.
- Ken Kataoka, Susumi Oishi and Shigeru Satomi (August 2, 2016). 絶望の牢獄から無実を叫ぶ―冤罪死刑囚八人の書画集― 単行本 [Screaming innocence from the prison of despair - A collection of innocent death row prisoners] (in Japanese). Rokusaisha. ISBN 978-4846310905.
- Takada Yanyama (December 28, 2016). 仁義の報復 元ヤクザの親分が語る埼玉愛犬家殺人事件の真実 単行本 [Original mob boss talks about retaliation, humanity and justice: the truth behind the Saitama Dog Lover Murders] (in Japanese). Shobo. ISBN 978-4801909533.
