= Yunohara, Gunma =

Dissolved municipality in Gunma prefecture, Japan

Yunohara (湯ノ原村, Yunohara-mura) was a village located in Tone District, northern Gunma Prefecture.

== Geography ==
- Mountain Range：Chinese: 仙ノ倉山、平標山、万太郎山、三国山、吾妻耶山、大峰山
- River：Chinese: 赤谷川、阿弥陀沢、大峰沢

== History ==
- April 1, 1889 Due to the municipal status enforcement, the villages of 新巻, 相俣, and 羽場 merged to form the village of Yunohara.
- May 1, 1908 Merged with the village of Kuga, Tone District, to form the village of village of Niiharu.
- October 1, 2005 Village of Niiharu merged with the towns of Tsukiyono and (former) Minakami to become the town of Minakami.
