= Kuroho, Gunma =

Dissolved municipality in Gunma prefecture, Japan

Kuroho (久呂保村, Kuroho-mura) was a village located in Tone District, northeastern Gunma Prefecture.

== Geography ==
- River：Tone River, Katashina River, 入沢川, 大久保川

== History ==
- April 1, 1889 - Due to the municipal status enforcement, the villages of Kawahake(川額), Tochikubo(栃久保), and Morishita(森下) merged to form the village of Kuroho, Kitaseta District.
- April 1, 1896 - Due to the district mergers (merger between Kitaseta and Tone Districts), the village belongs to Tone District.
- November 1, 1958 - Merged with the village of Itonose, Tone District, to become the village of Showa, Tone District.
