= Itonose, Gunma =

Dissolved municipality in Gunma prefecture, Japan

Itonose (糸之瀬村, Itonose-mura) was a village located in Tone District, northeastern Gunma Prefecture, Japan.

== Geography ==
- River：Katashina River

== History ==
- April 1, 1889 Due to the municipal status enforcement, the villages of Itoi(糸井) and Kainose(貝野瀬) merged to form the village of Itonose, Kitaseta District.
- April 1, 1896 Due to the district mergers(merger between Kitaseta and Tone Districts), the village belongs to Tone District.
- November 1, 1958 Merged with the village of Kuroho, Tone District, to become the village of Showa, Tone District.
