= Akagine, Gunma =

Dissolved municipality in Gunma prefecture, Japan

Akagine (赤城根村, Akagine-mura) was a village located in Tone District, northeastern Gunma Prefecture.

== Geography ==
- River - Katashina River, 根利川、赤城川

== History ==
- April 1, 1889: due to the municipal status enforcement, the village of Akagine, Kitaseta District, was formed.
- April 1, 1896: due to the mergers between Kitaseta and Tone, the village became part of the Tone district.
- September 30, 1956: merged with the village of Azuma, Tone District, to form the village of Tone, Tone district.
- February 13. 2005: the village of Tone merged into the city of Numata.
