= Kuga, Gunma =

Dissolved municipality in Gunma prefecture, Japan

Kuga (久賀村, Kuga-mura) was a village located in Tone District, northern Gunma Prefecture, Japan. The village first belonged to Agatsuma District.

== Geography ==
Before moving to Tone District, it was the northernmost village in Agatsuma District.

- Mountain Range：三国山、稲含山、赤沢山、雨見山
- River：赤谷川、西川、須川

== History ==
- April 1, 1889 Due to the municipal status enforcement, the villages of Sukawa (須川), Irisukawa (入須川), Nishiminesu (西峰須川), Higashiminesu (東峰須川), Fuse (布施), Moroda (師田), Sarugakyō (猿ヶ京), Fukuro (吹路), and Nagai (永井) merged to form the village of Kuga, Agatsuma District.
- April 1, 1896 Moved from Agatsuma District to Tone District.
- May 1, 1908 Merged with village of Yunohara, Tone District, to become the village of Niiharu.
- October 1, 2005 The village of Niiharu merged with the towns of Tsukiyono and (former) Minakami to become the town of Minakami.

== Famous Places ==
- Sagurakyō Hot Springs
