= Fukuro =

Fukuro may refer to:

- Fukurō (複廊), in Buddhist temple architecture, a set of covered corridors supported by three rows of pillars

== Places ==
- Fukuro Station (袋駅), Kumamoto, Japan
- Fukuro (吹路), a former village merged into Kuga, Gunma, Japan
- Fukuro, a former village merged into Uguisuzawa, Miyagi, Japan

== Popular culture ==
- Owl (film) or Fukurō, a 2004 black comedy
- Fukurō, a 2009 album by Plastic Tree
- "Fukurō", a song on the 2007 Sakanaction album Go to the Future
