= Azuma, Gunma (Tone) =

Dissolved municipality in Tone district, Gunma prefecture, Japan

Azuma (東村, Azuma-mura) was a village located in Tone District, northern Gunma Prefecture, Japan.

== Geography ==
The Katashina River, a branch of Tone River, flows on the west side of the former village.

- Mountains: Mount Sukai, Mount Shukudōbō
- Rivers: Katashina River, Tani River

== History ==
- April 1, 1889 – Azuma Village was created from merger of Hirakawa, Otsukai, Ōyō, Anahara, Sonohara, Ōhara-Shinchō, Oigami, Takatoya and Chidori-Nitta due to implementation of Municipal System Law.
- September 30, 1956 – Azuma was merged with Akagine, Tone District, to form Tone Village.
- February 13, 2005 – Tone was merged into Numata City.

== Scenic and Historic Places ==
- Fukiware Falls
- Oigami Hot Springs

== See also ==
- List of dissolved municipalities of Japan
