= Aimata Dam =

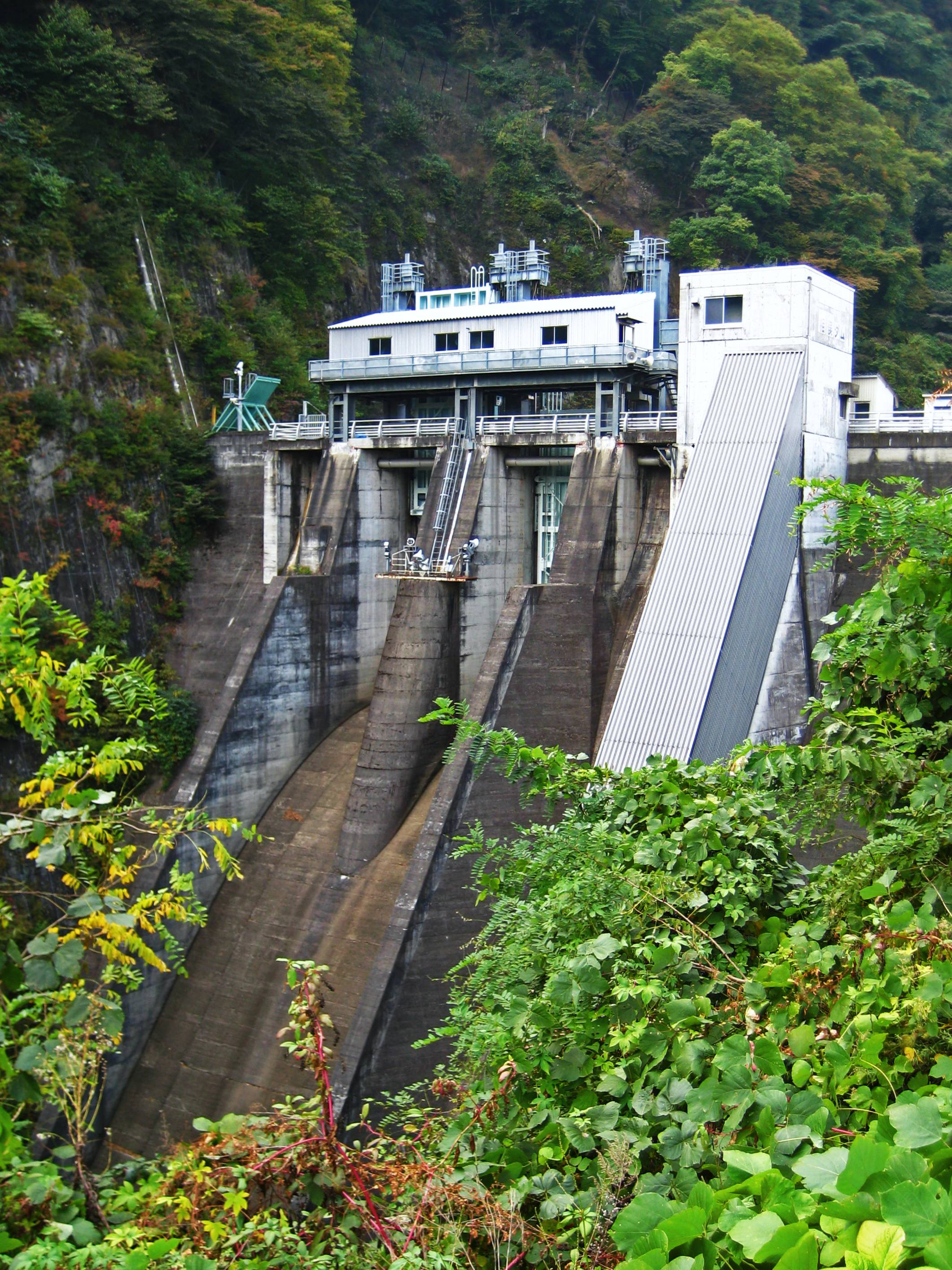
- Interactive map of Aimata Dam
- Location: Lower Miyasaka, Greater Aimata, Minakami, Tone District, Gunma Prefecture, Japan
- Coordinates: 36°42′44″N 138°53′35″E
- Construction began: 1952
- Opening date: 1959

Dam and spillways
- Type of dam: Gravity
- Impounds: Akaya River, Tonegawa River system
- Height: 67 m (220 ft)
- Length: 80 m (260 ft)
- Dam volume: 63,000 m^{3} (2,200,000 cu ft)

Reservoir
- Creates: Akaya Lake
- Total capacity: 25,000,000 m^{3} (880,000,000 cu ft)
- Catchment area: 110.8 km^{2} (42.8 sq mi)
- Surface area: 98.0 hectares

Power Station
- Operators: Ministry of Land, Infrastructure, Transport and Tourism Kantō Regional Development Bureau
- Installed capacity: Aimata Electrical Generation Plant: 7,300 kW; Aimata Secondary Electrical Generation Plant: 120 kW
- Purposes: Flood control, unspecified water use, hydroelectricity

Aimata Dam (相俣ダム) is a dam built on the Akaya River, part of the class-A Tonegawa River system at Aimata in the city of Minakami (the former village of Nīharimura), in the Tone District of Gunma Prefecture, Japan.

It is a gravity dam made of concrete, operated by the Ministry of Land, Infrastructure, Transport and Tourism's Kantō Regional Development Bureau, built to a height of 67.0 metres. As a member of the upstream Tonegawa River dam cluster, it supplies water to Tokyo and the Japanese capital region. The dam's purposes are flood prevention at the point where the Akaya River merges with the Tonegawa River in the former city of Tsukiyono, and energy generation via the Gunma Prefecture-operated hydroelectricity facilities, making it a multi-purpose dam. The artificial Akaya Lake was created by the dam.

== History ==
In the wake of the massive damage sustained by the Tonegawa River system from 1947's Typhoon Kathleen, the Economic Stabilization Board's consultative flood prevention committee proposed the construction of a reservoir as the pillar of a cumulative plan for developing flood prevention infrastructure. The Ministry of Construction's Kantō Regional Development Bureau drafted the "Tonegawa River Repair and Improvement Plan" in response to this proposal; the plan was based on the construction of (originally) 9 multi-purpose dams on the Tonegawa River system. These eventually became the Tonegawa River 8 Dam Cluster, with one of the dams on the main Tonegawa River—Fujiwara Dam—being already under construction.

Preliminary studies for dam construction were begun on the Akaya River in 1948. Afterward, the dam project's operation was turned over to Gunma Prefecture, rebranded as the auxiliary "Akaya River Cumulative Project"; construction began in 1952, and completed in 1956. However, during initial impoundment (in which the dam is partially filled to test for abnormalities), leakage through the bedrock on the left bank was discovered, and Gunma Prefecture requested repairs from the Ministry of Construction. That same year, concrete work was started to enable seepage control on the left bank. Repairs were completed three years later in 1959, and construction was finalized. Aimata Dam was placed under the direct management of the Ministry of Construction, and became the second of the Tonegawa River 8 Dam Cluster.

== Purpose ==
Aimata Dam provides flood control from the Akaya River to the bank of the merged Tonegawa River, rated to cut a (1947) Typhoon Kathleen-level design flood of 650 tons per second to 330 tons per second (cutting 320 tons per second). It maintains customary water rights of 140 tons per second for irrigation water (with unspecified usage permissions) to the city of Kuki in Saitama Prefecture, and also creates energy via the Aimata electricity generation plant, with a permitted output of 7,300 kW, and the Momono electricity generation plant, with a permitted output of 6,200 kW. Afterward, the #2 Aimata electricity generation plant (120 kW) was added, to make use of the sustained effluent. Each generation plant is independently run at the prefectural level by the Gunma Prefecture Public Enterprise Bureau.

Currently, the dam functions as a valuable source of water for the capital region, and is controlled via the Tonegawa River Integrated Dam Group Operation Office in the city of Maebashi. The dam site itself is cut into a large "V" shape, and is fairly tall in proportion to its length.

== Akaya Lake ==
The famous Sarugakyou hot springs are located adjacent to the lake created by the dam—Akaya Lake. The hot spring facilities were originally located adjacent to the Akaya River, but submerged as a result of the dam's establishment, similar to Yanba Dam and the Kawarayu hot springs. However, in the case of Sarugakyou, the source of the hot spring was preserved, allowing for the development of a new hot spring resort area, and many hotels and inns sprung up around the shores of Akaya Lake, drawing numerous hot spring tourists to Gunma Prefecture.

Route 17, which passes nearby, is more commonly known as the Mikuni Kaidō highway, and drivers continuing along toward Niigata go through the Mikuni Touge mountain pass. This road historically linked the former Echigo province and the former Kouzuke province, and was used several times by the military commander Uesugi Kenshin to cross over to and attack Kantō during the Warring States period. Featuring attractions like the Minakami Hot Springs, Mount Tanigawa, and the city of Yuzawa's ski area, the area features several touristic points of interest.

In 2005, it was designated by the Water Resources Environment Engineering Center as one of Japan's "Selected 100 Dam Lakes" after recommendation from the city of Minami.

== Kawafuru Dam Plan ==
The population of the Capital region exploded after the completion of Aimata Dam; to meet demand, the Ministry of Construction and the Water Resources Development Organization (renamed as the Japan Water Agency) energetically continued development of the Tonegawa River system. However, in the 1980s, droughts had begun to occur at a rate of once every two-to-three years, accompanied by a lack of rainfall, both attributed to the effects of global warming. To secure enough water to meet demand, the Ministry of Construction implemented the "Emergency Water Supply-Countermeasure Dam Project" to retain water in reservoirs during droughts.

The Akaya River and Kawafuru Hot Springs upstream of Aimata Dam were singled out, and plans were brought forth for the newer "Kawafuru Dam" on the Akaya River. The concrete gravity dam was to be built at Kawafuru to a height of 131.0 meters, with flood control storage of 46,000,000 tons of water, appropriating water to municipal and industrial water systems and helping to alleviate water shortages in the Capital region.

A construction feasibility study was carried out in 1990, after which the initial plans were altered to increase the height of the dam to 160.0 meters and the flood control storage to 76,000,000 tons. However, water demand from the Capital region continued to increase, and as public projects at the time were all being put under review, the dam project was scheduled for further reevaluation. Water demand eventually shrank, and as the necessity of Kawafuru Dam was called into question the construction project was put on hold for an indefinite period of time.
