= Aimata =

Aimata may refer to

- Aimata, Minami City, Gunma Prefecture, Japan, the location of the Aimata Dam
- Pōmare IV, ʻAimata Pōmare IV Vahine-o-Punuateraʻitua, Queen of Tahiti from 1827 to 1877
- Aimata Leroy, French Polynesian relay runner, participant in Athletics at the 1989 South Pacific Mini Games
