= Usune =

Usune may refer to:

- Usune, Gunma, a village in Gunma Prefecture, Japan
- Usune Masatoshi (born 1961), Japanese anime artist
