= Yoshinori Ueda =

Yoshinori Ueda may refer to:

- Yoshinori Ueda (baseball)
- Yoshinori Ueda (serial killer)
