= Sudagai Dam =

Dam in Gunma Prefecture, Japan

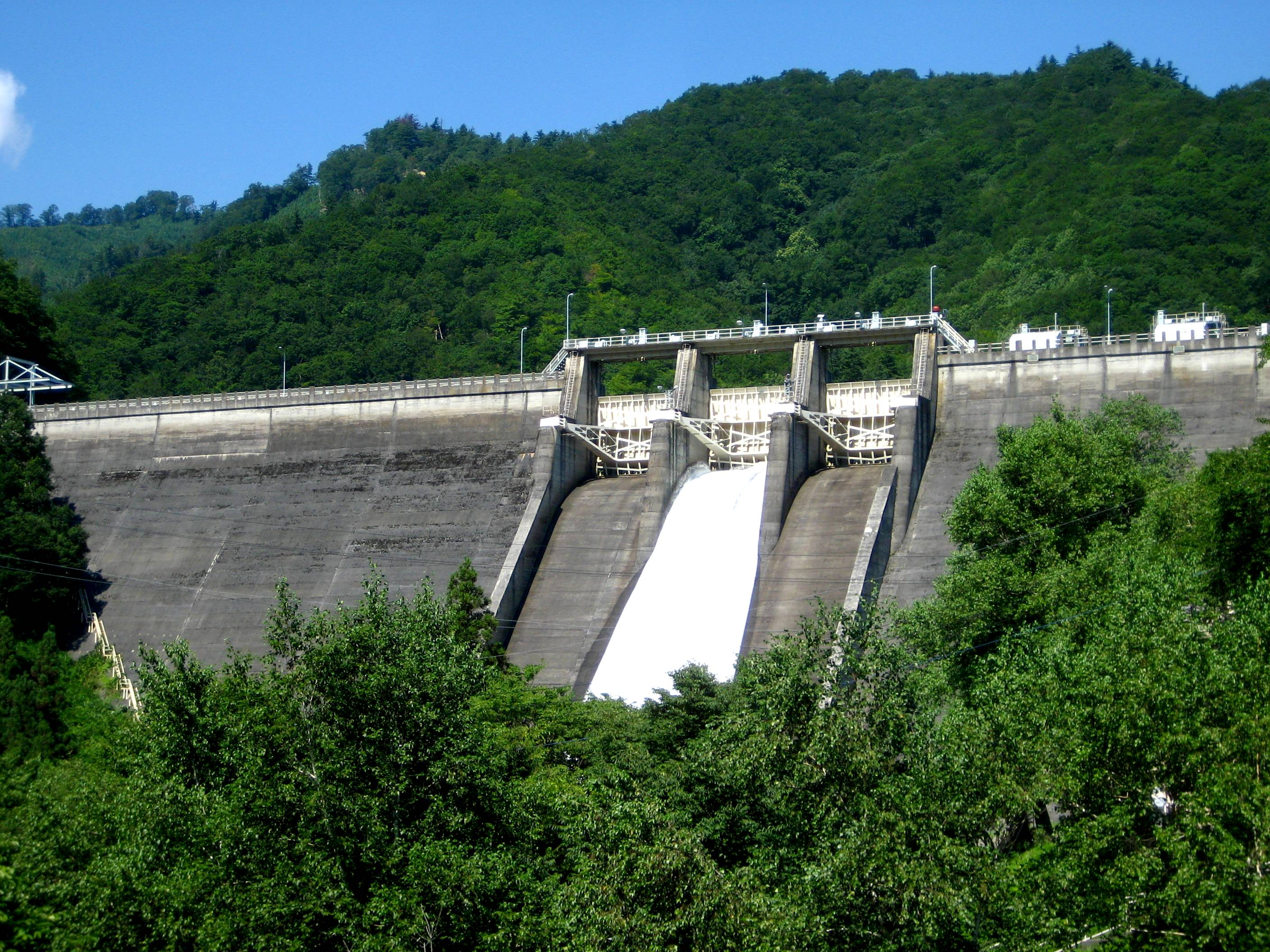
- Interactive map of Sudagai Dam
- Location: Minakami, Gunma Prefecture, Japan.
- Coordinates: 36°52′06″N 139°03′39″E
- Construction began: 1952
- Opening date: 1955

Dam and spillways
- Type of dam: Gravity
- Impounds: Tone River
- Height: 72 m (236 ft)
- Length: 194.4 m (638 ft)

Reservoir
- Total capacity: 28,500,000 m^{3} (1.01×10^{9} cu ft)
- Catchment area: 310.1 km^{2} (119.7 sq mi)
- Surface area: 130 hectares

Sudagai Dam is a dam in Minakami, in the Gunma Prefecture of Japan. It supports a 44.8 MW hydroelectric power station.
