= Ikeda, Gunma =

Ikeda, Gunma 池田村
- Former village
- Location in Japan
- Country: Japan
- Prefecture: Gunma
- District: Tone

Ikeda (池田村, Ikeda-mura) was a village located in Tone District, northern Gunma Prefecture.

== Geography ==
- River ‐ 薄根川、発知川

== History ==
- April 1, 1889 Due to the municipal status enforcement, the villages of 下発知, 発知新田, 奈良, 秋塚, 岡谷, 中発知, 上発知, and 佐山 merged to form the village of Ikeda, Tone District.
- April 1, 1954 Merged with the town of Numata and the villages of Tonami, Usune, and Kawada to create the city of Numata.
