= Kawada, Gunma =

Dissolved municipality in Gunma prefecture, Japan

Kawada (川田村, Kawada-mura) was a village located in Tone District, northern Gunma Prefecture, in Japan.

== Geography ==
- River – Tone River

== History ==
- April 1, 1889 – Due to the municipal status enforcement, the five villages of 上川田, 下川田, 今井, 屋形原, and 岩本 merge to form the village of Kawada.
- April 1, 1954 – Kawada merges with the town of Numata and the villages of Tonami, Ikeda, and Usune to create the city of Numata.
