= Yagisawa Dam =

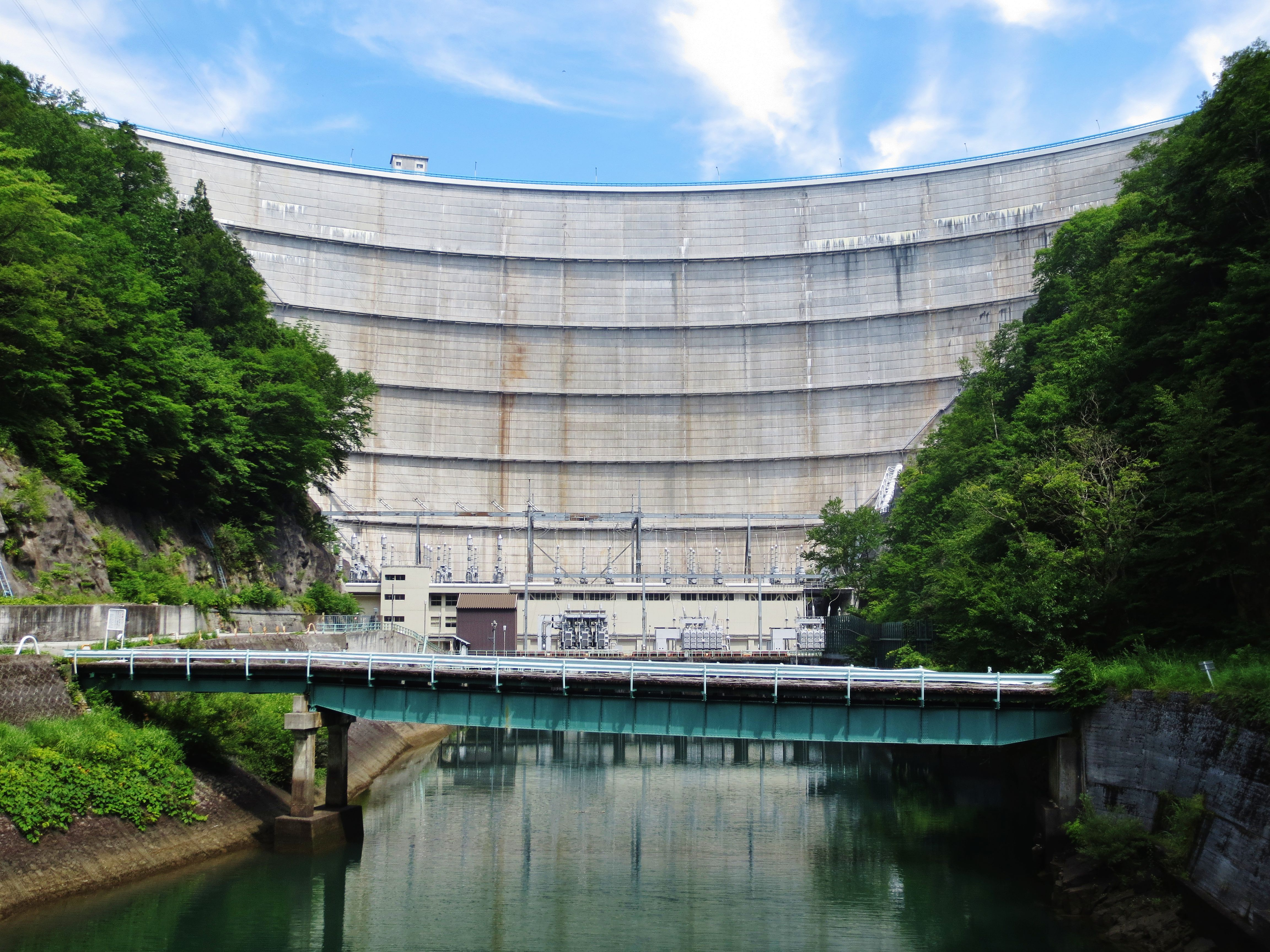
- Interactive map of Yagisawa Dam
- Location: Minakami, Gunma Prefecture, Japan
- Coordinates: 36°54′41″N 139°03′23″E
- Construction began: 1959
- Opening date: 1967

Dam and spillways
- Type of dam: Arch-Gravity
- Impounds: Tone River
- Height: 131 m (430 ft)
- Length: 352 m (1,155 ft)

Reservoir
- Creates: Lake Oku-Tone
- Total capacity: 204,300,000 m^{3} (7.21×10^{9} cu ft)
- Catchment area: 167.4 km^{2} (64.6 sq mi)
- Surface area: 570 hectares

Yagisawa Dam (矢木沢ダム) is a dam in the Gunma Prefecture of Japan; it supports a 240 MW hydroelectric power station.
