= Naramata Dam =

Dam in Gunma Prefecture, Japan

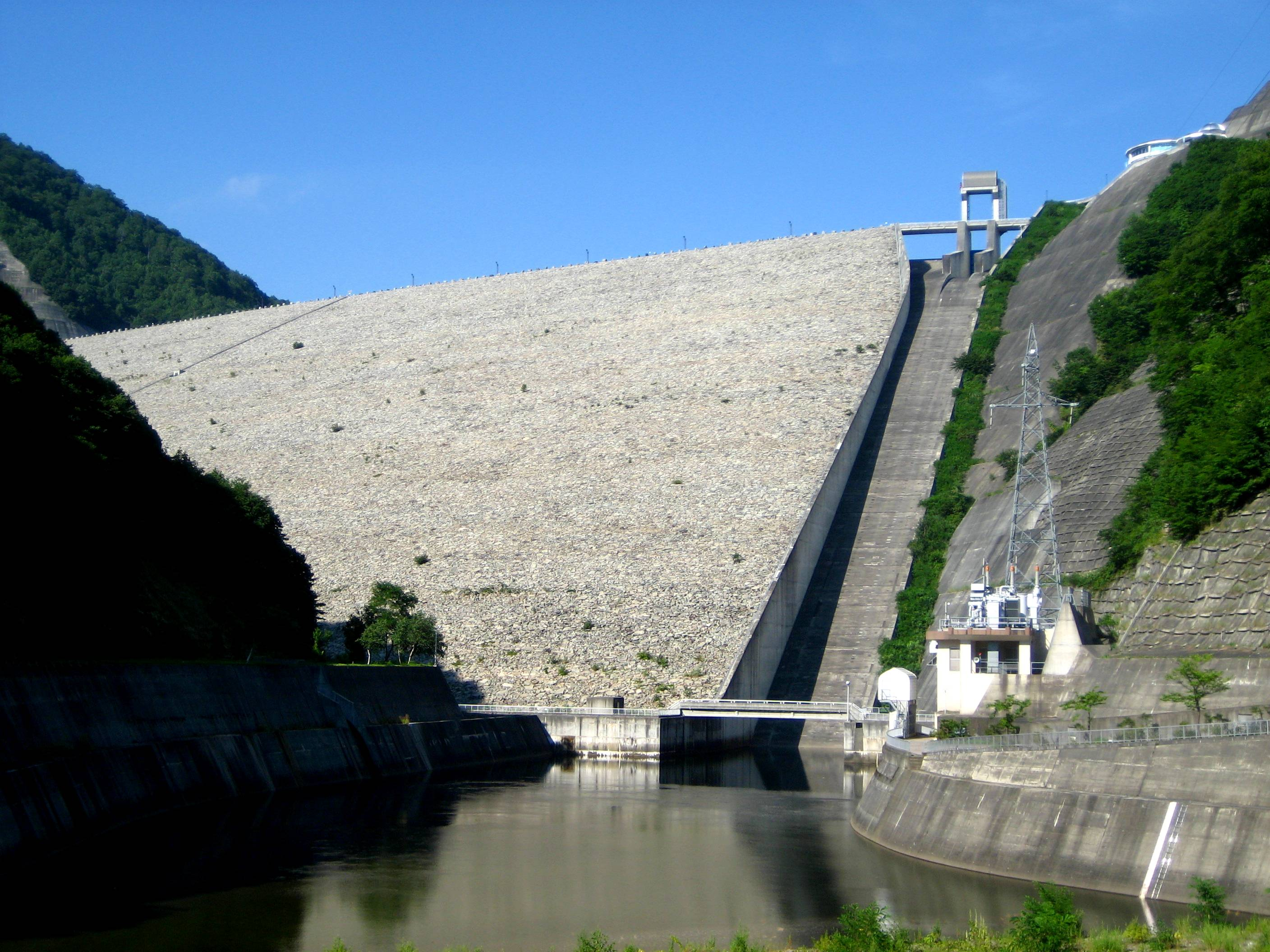
- Interactive map of Naramata Dam
- Location: Minakami, Gunma Prefecture, Japan.
- Coordinates: 36°52′57″N 139°04′46″E
- Construction began: 1973
- Opening date: 1990

Dam and spillways
- Type of dam: Embankment
- Impounds: Naramata River
- Height: 158 m (518 ft)
- Length: 520 m (1,710 ft)

Reservoir
- Creates: Lake Naramata
- Total capacity: 90,000,000 m^{3} (3.2×10^{9} cu ft)
- Catchment area: 95.4 km^{2} (36.8 sq mi)
- Surface area: 200 hectares

Naramata Dam is a dam near Minakami, in the Gunma Prefecture of Japan. It supports a 12.2 MW hydroelectric power station.

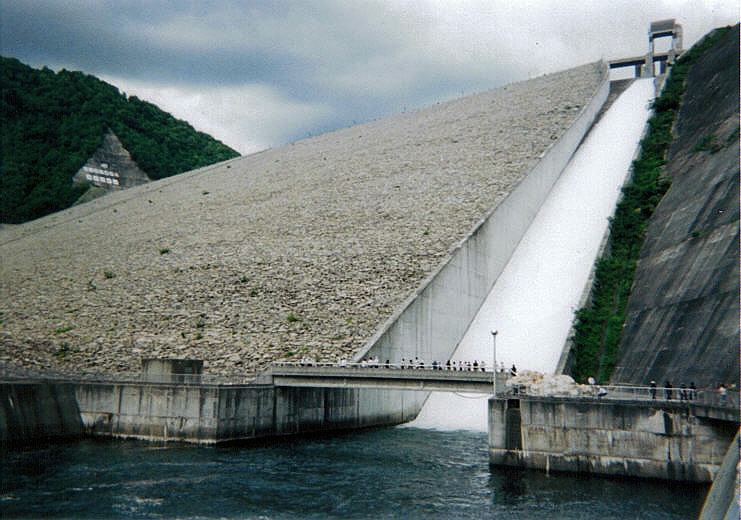
