= Cold Fish =

- Theatrical release poster
- Directed by: Sion Sono
- Written by: Sion Sono; Yoshiki Takahashi
- Produced by: Yoshinori Chiba; Toshiki Kimura
- Starring: Mitsuru Fukikoshi; Denden; Asuka Kurosawa
- Cinematography: Shinya Kimura
- Edited by: Junichi Ito
- Music by: Tomohide Harada
- Production company: Nikkatsu
- Release dates: September 7, 2010 (Venice); January 29, 2011 (Japan)
- Running time: 145 minutes
- Country: Japan
- Language: Japanese

Cold Fish (Note: 冷たい熱帯魚 (Tsumetai Nettaigyo, lit. Cold Tropical Fish)) is a 2010 Japanese crime horror film directed by Sion Sono, who co-wrote the screenplay with Yoshiki Takahashi. It stars Mitsuru Fukikoshi, Denden, and Asuka Kurosawa. It follows an eccentric couple who give a troubled teenager a job at their tropical fish shop, only for her father to find himself entangled in the couple's horrifying secret life.

Loosely based on the true story of serial killer couple Sekine Gen and Hiroko Kazama, Cold Fish premiered at the 67th Venice International Film Festival on September 7, 2010, and received the best screenplay award in the Fantastic Features section at the 2010 Fantastic Fest. It was released as part of the Bloody Disgusting Selects line in Japan on January 29, 2011.

== Plot ==
Nobuyuki Shamoto is a meek man who runs a small tropical fish shop in Shizuoka. His home life is unhappy; Mitsuko, his teenage daughter from his first marriage, is rude and violent towards him and Taeko, her stepmother. One day, Mitsuko is caught stealing from a supermarket. An exuberant and eccentric man named Yukio Murata steps in, convinces the store manager to let Mitsuko go and invites the Shamoto family to visit his much larger and more impressive fish shop. He offers Mitsuko a job and suggests that he and Nobuyuki become business partners.

Nobuyuki is reluctant to take Yukio's offer at first but is coerced into accepting it by Taeko, who finds herself entranced by Yukio after he rapes her. Yukio introduces Nobuyuki to expensive fish, new clients and the chance to make more money. Yukio and his wife Aiko soon reveal themselves to be sociopathic serial killers who run their fish business as a cover to scam, kill and dispose of people they see as threats. Yukio forces Nobuyuki to join him and Aiko at their cabin to dismember, burn and dump their victims' corpses in the river before cleaning up the crime scenes. He uses pressure, flattery and fear to control Nobuyuki, much as he did with Taeko.

Feeling increasingly afraid and trapped, Nobuyuki starts losing his sense of right and wrong. Mitsuko seems to be adjusting to life at Yukio's shop, but Nobuyuki does not know what is really happening to her as she refuses to talk to him. During one of their trips into the forest to dispose of body parts, Yukio humiliates Nobuyuki in front of Aiko and goads him into a fistfight to prove his worth. His revelation that he slept with Taeko proves too much for Nobuyuki, who stabs him to death with a ballpoint pen. Aiko is also stabbed in the neck but survives, developing a twisted sense of devotion to Nobuyuki. They take Yukio's corpse back to their cabin, where Nobuyuki instructs Aiko to dismember it like her previous victims.

Nobuyuki returns home, where he forces Taeko and Mitsuko to have dinner with him and act like a normal family. Mitsuko's boyfriend arrives and she again disrespects Nobuyuki by leaving the dinner table early to meet him outside, causing Nobuyuki to knock her and her boyfriend out. He drags Mitsuko's unconscious body back into the dining room and rapes Taeko when she tries to argue with him, knocking Mitsuko out once again when she wakes up during the rape. He travels back to the cabin, where Aiko tries to have sex with him after having partially dismembered Yukio's body, but he hits her with a statue. She attacks him and tries to initiate sex again, but he fatally stabs her. She crawls over to Yukio's body before dying.

Takayasu Tsutsui and Masato Yonkura, two detectives who previously tried to recruit Nobuyuki to confirm their suspicions about Yukio and Aiko, arrive at the cabin to find him sitting outside. After they rush inside, Nobuyuki notices Taeko and Mitsuko in the back of their car; Taeko runs out to hug him, but he stabs her before telling Mitsuko that she will finally get her wish of living independently and taking care of herself. He then slits his own throat in front of Mitsuko, who is at first horrified but quickly starts laughing and mocking him.

== Cast ==
- Mitsuru Fukikoshi as Nobuyuki Shamoto
- Denden as Yukio Murata
- Asuka Kurosawa as Aiko Murata
- Megumi Kagurazaka as Taeko Shamoto
- Hikari Kajiwara as Mitsuko Shamoto
- Tetsu Watanabe as Takayasu Tsutsui
- Ryouhei Abe as Masato Yonkura

== Production ==
Cold Fish is the third film to be released by Sushi Typhoon, a branch of the production company Nikkatsu that specialises in splatter films, following Alien vs Ninja and Mutant Girls Squad. Director and co-writer Sion Sono was influenced by Japanese crime cases while developing Cold Fish, specifically the serial killer couple Sekine Gen and Hiroko Kazama. Sono also wanted to "depict a sense of total hopelessness" which he felt is "lacking in Japanese films".

== Release ==
Cold Fish premiered at the 67th Venice International Film Festival on September 7, 2010. It was also shown at film festivals in Busan and at the Toronto International Film Festival, where it received its North American premiere. It won the best screenplay award in the Fantastic Features section at Fantastic Fest 2010. It was released theatrically in Japan on January 29, 2011.

== Reception ==
Film Business Asia gave Cold Fish an 8/10 rating and singled out actor Denden for praise, claiming that the film "may never have worked" without his "tour-de-force performance" while stating, "Though there's considerable gore on display, it's largely cartoonish. Cold Fish is not so much a blood-and-guts horror movie, more a danse macabre about social breakdown." Total Film gave the film a 3/5 rating, suggesting that its plot twists and use of dark comedy offered a welcome reprieve from the "largely hysterical acting and rivers of viscera".

The Guardian found the film to be "fairly ordinary" in comparison to Sono's other works and felt that it was too long. Radio Times gave the film 3/5 stars and praised the acting from Denden, Fukikoshi, and Kurosawa; it also singled out Shinya Kimura's cinematography and Takashi Matsuzuka's production design, which it felt made up for some of Sono's "overindulgent directorial moments".
