= Tamahara Dam =

Dam in Gunma Prefecture, Japan

Tanbara Dam
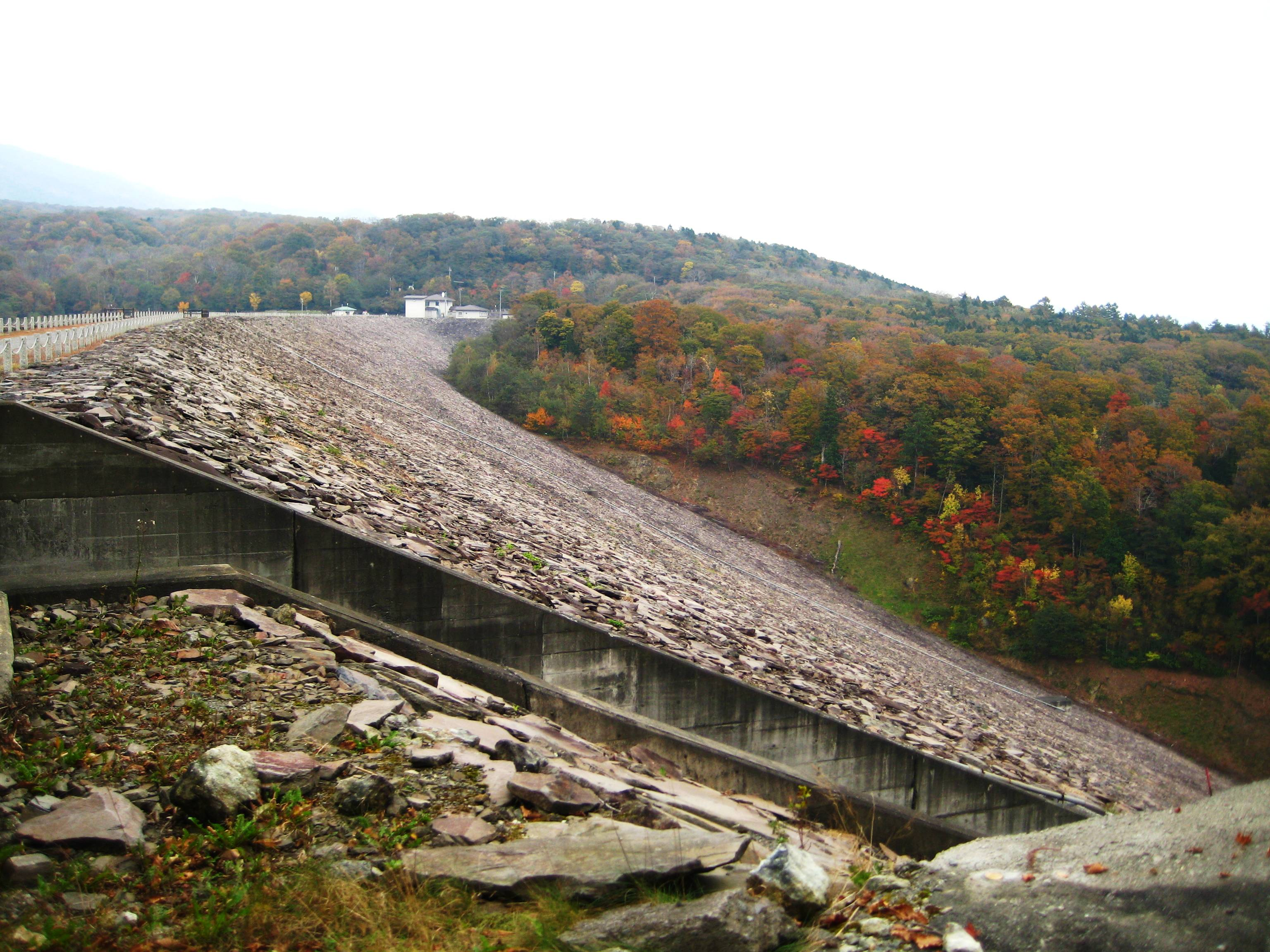

- Location within Japan
- Country: Japan
- Location: Numata
- Coordinates: 36°46′29″N 139°03′46″E
- Status: Operational
- Construction began: 1973
- Opening date: 1981
- Owner: TEPCO

Dam and spillways
- Type of dam: Embankment, rock-fill
- Impounds: Hotchi River
- Height: 116 m (381 ft)
- Length: 570.1 m (1,870 ft)
- Elevation at crest: 1,177 m (3,862 ft)
- Width (crest): 12 m (39 ft)
- Width (base): 550 m (1,800 ft)
- Dam volume: 5,435,000 m^{3} (7,109,000 cu yd)

Reservoir
- Total capacity: 14,800,000 m^{3} (12,000 acre⋅ft)
- Active capacity: 13,000,000 m^{3} (11,000 acre⋅ft)
- Catchment area: 6.5 km^{2} (2.5 mi^{2})
- Surface area: 57 ha (140 acres)
- Normal elevation: 1,173 m (3,848 ft)

Power Station
- Commission date: 1986
- Hydraulic head: 518 m (1,699 ft) (effective)
- Turbines: 4 x 300 MW (400,000 hp) Francis pump-turbines
- Installed capacity: 1,200 MW (1,600,000 hp)

Tanbara Dam (玉原ダム, which can be mistakenly read Tamahara Dam) is a rock-fill embankment dam impounding the headwaters of the Hotchi River, a Tone River tributary in Gunma Prefecture of Japan. It is located 14 kilometres (8.7 mi) north of Numata. It creates the upper reservoir for the 1,200 megawatts (1,600,000 hp) Tamahara Pumped Storage Power Station (玉原発電所). Construction began in 1973 and the dam was complete in 1981 while the power station was commissioned in 1986. It is 116 metres (381 ft) tall and withholds a reservoir with a storage capacity of 14,800,000 m^{3} (11,999 acre⋅ft). Of that capacity, 13,000,000 cubic metres (11,000 acre⋅ft) is active (or useful) for power generation. The lower reservoir for the pumped-storage power station is created by the Fujiwara Dam, located 4 km (2 mi) to the northwest on another Tone River tributary. Power is generated during periods of high energy demand and pumping occurs during times when energy demand is low such as at night. The power station contains four 300 megawatts (400,000 hp) reversible Francis turbine pump-generators which serve to both pump water and generate electricity. The upper Tamahara Reservoir is at an elevation of 1,177 metres (3,862 ft) and the lower Fujiwara Reservoir is at 651 metres (2,136 ft) which affords the power station an effective hydraulic head of 518 metres (1,699 ft). When pumping, the pump-generators can move up to 210 cubic metres per second (7,400 cu ft/s) of water and when generating, they discharge up to 276 cubic metres per second (9,700 cu ft/s).

== See also ==
- List of power stations in Japan
- List of pumped-storage hydroelectric power stations
