= Tonami, Gunma =

Dissolved municipality in Gunma prefecture, Japan

Tonami (利南村, Tonami-mura) was a village located in Tone District, northern Gunma Prefecture, Japan.

== Geography ==
- River ‐ Tone River、Katashina River

== History ==
- April 1, 1889 Due to the municipal status enforcement, the town of 戸鹿野新 and the villages of 戸鹿野, 沼須, 上沼須, 下久屋, 上久屋, and 横塚 merged to form the village of Tonami, Tone District.
- April 1, 1954 The village merged with the town of Numata and the village of Ikeda, Usune, and Kawada, Tone District, to create the city of Numata.
