= Niiharu, Gunma =

Former Japanese village

Niiharu (新治村, Niiharu-mura) was a village located in Tone District, Gunma Prefecture, Japan.

On October 1, 2005, Niihari, along with the town of Tsukiyono (also from Tone District), was merged into the expanded town of Minakami.
