= Usune, Gunma =

Dissolved municipality in Gunma prefecture, Japan

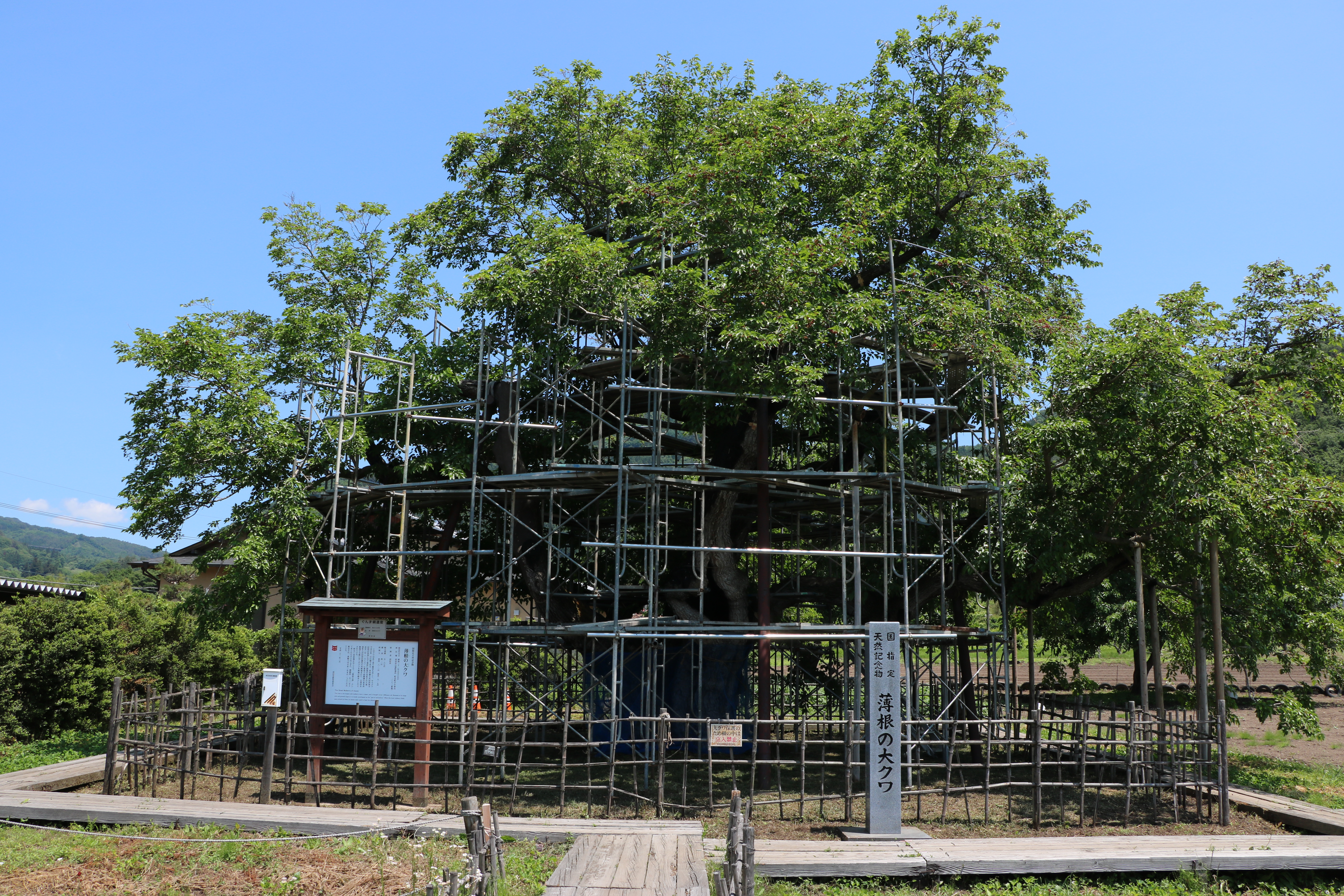
The Great Mulberry of Usune

Usune (薄根村, Usune-mura) was a village located in Tone District, northern Gunma Prefecture, Japan.

== Geography ==
- River - Tone River, Usune River, 小沢川

== History ==
- April 1, 1889 - Due to the municipal status enforcement, the villages of 下沼田, 善桂寺, 堀廻, 大釜, 原, 宇楚井, 石墨, 戸神, 町田, 白岩, 井土上, 恩田, and 硯田 merged to form the village of Usune, Tone District.
- April 1, 1954 - Merged with the town of Numata and the villages of Tonami, Ikeda, and Kawada to create the city of Numata.
