= Kawaba, Gunma =

Kawaba 川場村
- Village
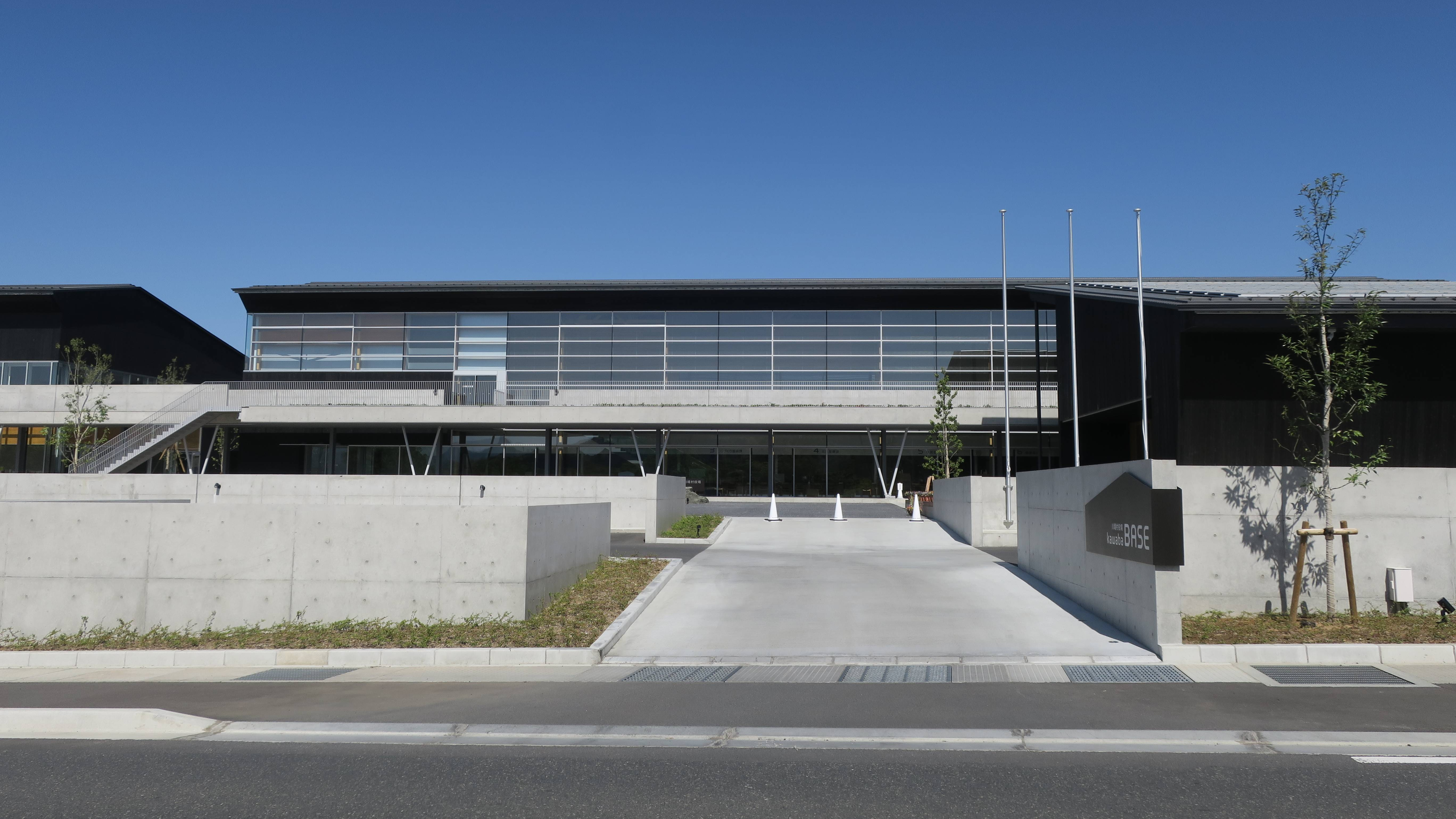
- Kawaba village hall

- Flag Seal

- Location of Kawaba in Gunma Prefecture

- Coordinates: 36°41′40.7″N 139°6′23.3″E
- Country: Japan
- Region: Kantō
- Prefecture: Gunma
- District: Tone

Area
  - Total: 85.25 km^{2} (32.92 sq mi)

Population (August 2020)
  - Total: 3,241
  - Density: 38.02/km^{2} (98.47/sq mi)
- Time zone: UTC+9 (Japan Standard Time)
- Phone number: 0278-52-2111
- Address: 2390-2 Yachi, Kawaba-mura, Tone-gun, Gunma-ken 378-0101
- Website: Official website

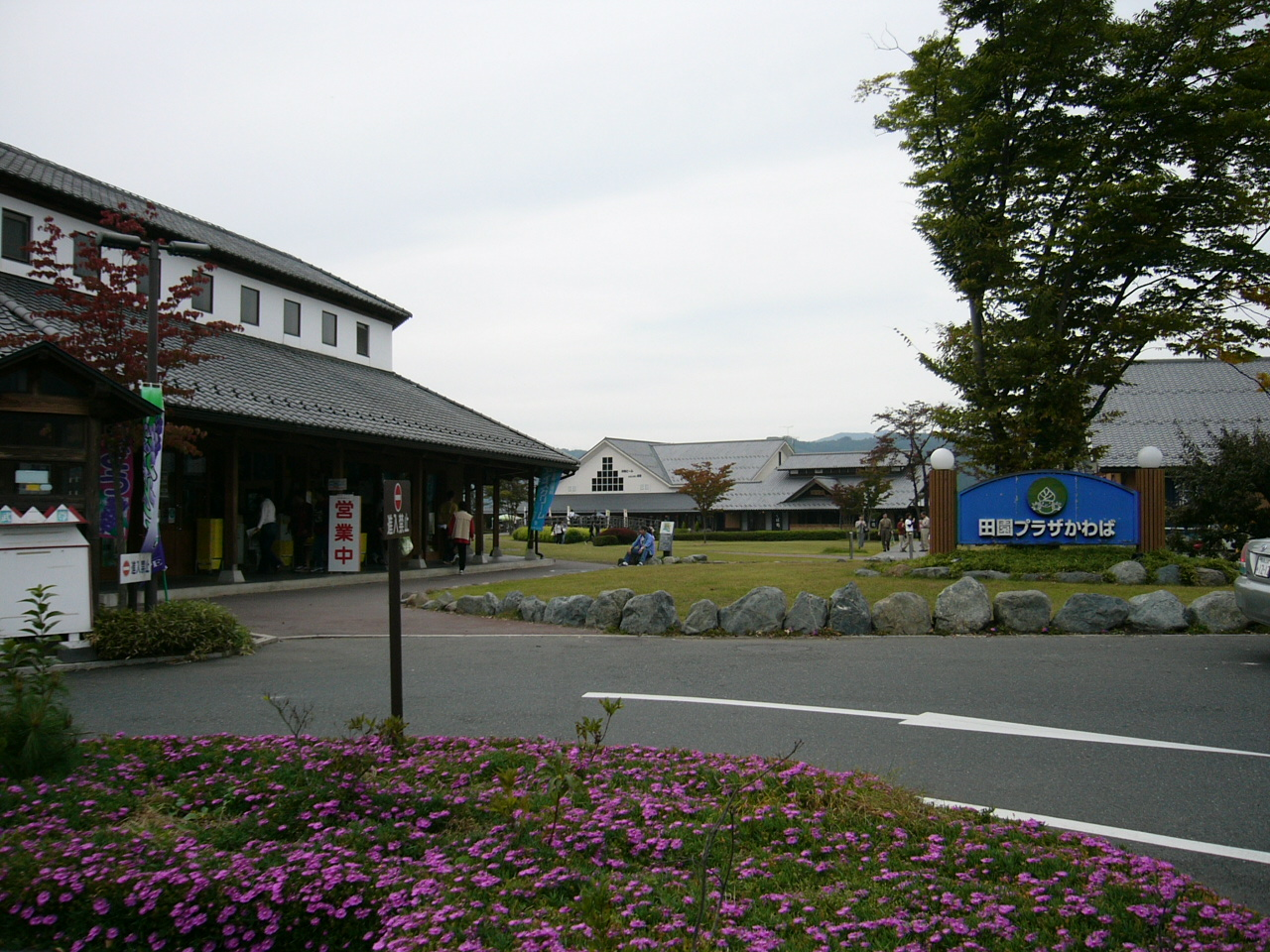
Road station Kawaba Den-en Plaza

Kawaba (川場村, Kawaba-mura) is a village located in Gunma Prefecture, Japan. As of 31 October 2020, the village had an estimated population of 3,241 in 1127 households, and a population density of 110 persons per km^{2}. The total area of the village is 85.25 square kilometres (32.92 sq mi).

== Geography ==
Located in north-central Gunma, Kawaba is in a mountainous area. Approximately 83% of its area is covered by forests, and five rivers (the Tashiro, Sakura, Tazawa, Usune, and the Mizomata) flow through the village. Kawaba, meaning "the place of the rivers" is thought to be named after its many streams.

- Mountains: Mount Hotaka (2158m)
- Rivers: Tashiro River, Sakura River, Tazawa River, Usune River, Mizomata River

=== Surrounding municipalities ===
Gunma Prefecture

- Katashina
- Minakami
- Numata

=== Climate ===
Kawaba has a oceanic climate (Köppen Cfb) characterized by warm summers and cold winters with heavy snowfall. The average annual temperature in Kawaba is 9.1 °C. The average annual rainfall is 1763 mm with September as the wettest month. The temperatures are highest on average in August, at around 21.7 °C, and lowest in January, at around -2.8 °C.

== Demographics ==
Per Japanese census data, the population of Kawaba has remained relatively constant for a century.

Historical population
Year	Pop.	±%
1920	3,958	—
1930	4,316	+9.0%
1940	4,552	+5.5%
1950	5,349	+17.5%
1960	5,046	−5.7%
1970	4,109	−18.6%
1980	3,905	−5.0%
1990	4,082	+4.5%
2000	4,139	+1.4%
2010	3,906	−5.6%
2020	3,480	−10.9%

== History ==
The area of present-day Kawaba was part of the holdings of Numata Domain in Kōzuke Province during the Edo period. On April 1, 1889, with the creation of the modern municipalities system after the Meiji Restoration, Kawaba village was established within Tone District, Gunma. In 2002, a proposal to merge Kawaba into neighboring Numata was opposed by young local politicians, who instead proposed that the village be merged with its sister city, Setagaya, Tokyo. However, this proposal was strongly opposed by the Gunma prefectural government and met with lukewarm response from Setagaya, and the village remained independent.

== Government ==
Kawaba has a mayor-council form of government with a directly elected mayor and a unicameral village council of 10 members. Kawaba, together with the other municipalities in Tone District, contributes one member to the Gunma Prefectural Assembly. In terms of national politics, the town is part of Gunma 1st district of the lower house of the Diet of Japan.

== Economy ==
The economy of Kawaba is heavily dependent on agriculture; primarily rice, and apples and blueberries. Seasonal tourism to ski resorts and to onsen also play a major role in the economy.

== Education ==
Kawaba has one public elementary school and one public middle school operated by the village government. The village does not have a high school.

== Transportation ==
Kawaba does not have any passenger railway service and is also not connected by any national highways.

== Local attractions ==
- Kawaba Ski Resort
- Kichijō temple
- Roadside Station Kawaba Denen Plaza
