= Fujiwara Dam =

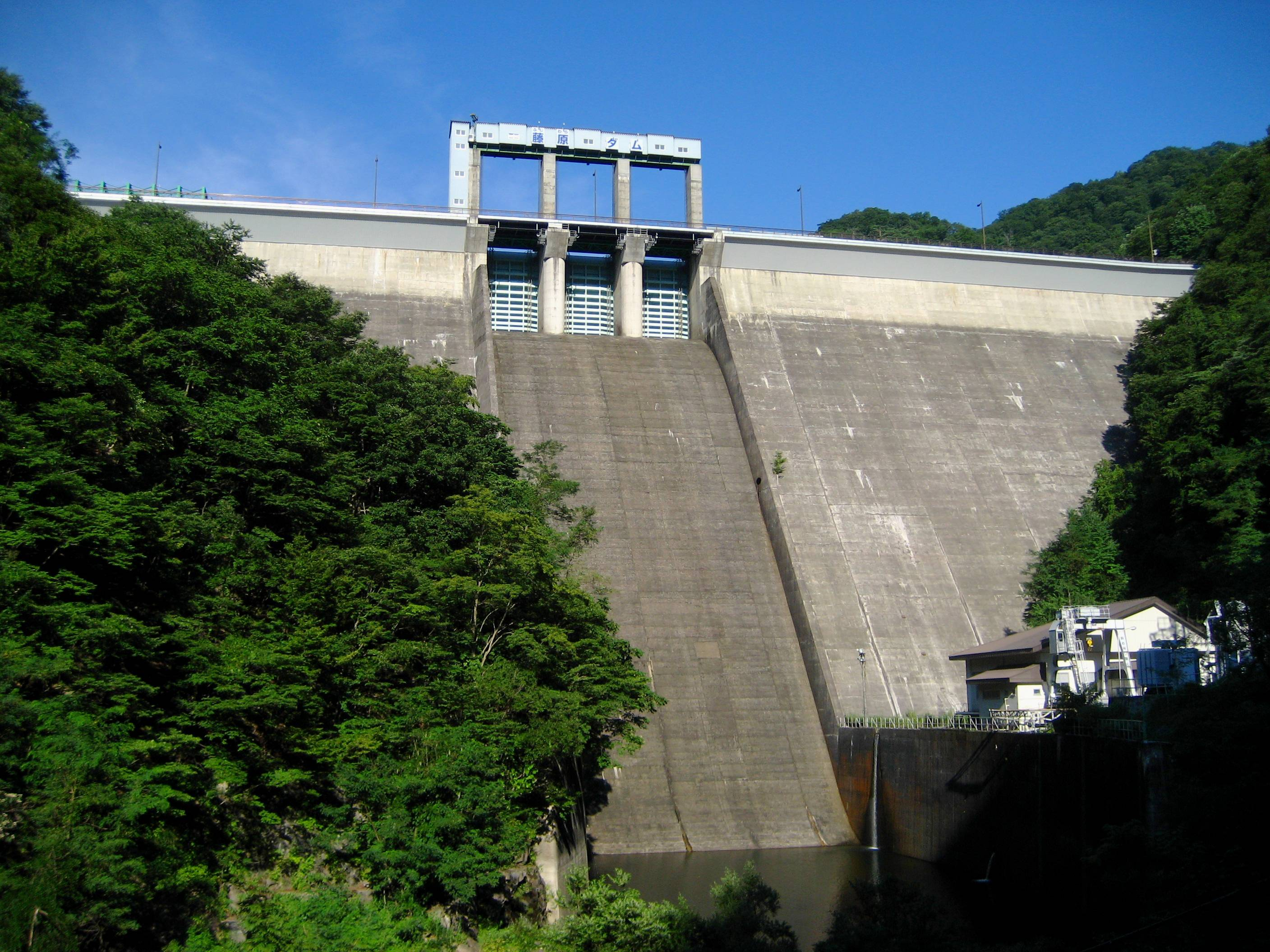

- Location within Japan
- Country: Japan
- Location: Minakami
- Coordinates: 36°48′16″N 139°02′12″E
- Status: Operational
- Construction began: 1951
- Opening date: 1957
- Owner: TEPCO

Dam and spillways
- Type of dam: Concrete gravity
- Impounds: Tone River
- Height: 95 m (312 ft)
- Length: 230 m (755 ft)
- Dam volume: 415,000 m^{3} (542,800 cu yd)

Reservoir
- Total capacity: 52,490,000 m^{3} (42,554 acre⋅ft)
- Active capacity: 35,890,000 m^{3} (29,096 acre⋅ft)
- Catchment area: 401 km^{2} (155 mi^{2})
- Surface area: 1.69 km^{2} (1 mi^{2})
- Normal elevation: 651 m (2,136 ft)

Power Station
- Commission date: 1956
- Hydraulic head: 92 m (302 ft)
- Turbines: 1 x 23 MW Francis-type
- Installed capacity: 23 MW

Fujiwara Dam (藤原ダム) is a gravity dam on the Tone River in Gunma Prefecture of Japan. It is located 14 km (9 mi) north of Minakami. It was constructed between 1951 and 1957. The dam itself supports a single Francis turbine hydroelectric generator with a 23 MW capacity which was commissioned in 1957. The reservoir created by the dam serves as the lower reservoir for the 1,200 Tamahara Pumped Storage Power Station which was commissioned in 1986. The dam is 95 m (312 ft) high and withholds a reservoir with a 52,490,000 m^{3} (42,554 acre⋅ft) storage capacity.

== See also ==
- List of power stations in Japan
- List of pumped-storage hydroelectric power stations
