= Tone District, Gunma =

District in Gunma prefecture, Japan

Coordinates: 36°51′36″N 139°05′24″E

Location of Tone District in Gunma Prefecture

Tone District (利根郡, Tone-gun) is a rural district located in Gunma Prefecture, Japan. As of January 2015, the district had an estimated population of 34,946 and an area of 1,322.23 km^{2}, with a population density of 26.4 people per square kilometer.

== Towns and villages ==
- Katashina
- Kawaba
- Minakami
- Shōwa

Much of the city of Numata was formerly part of the district.

== History ==
The area of Tone District was formerly part of Kōzuke Province. Per a census conducted at the end of the Edo period, the area was divided into one town and 66 villages administered as tenryō directly by the Tokugawa shogunate or various hatamoto and two towns and 47 villages under the control of Numata Domain. One village was under the joint control of the Shogunate and Numata Domain.

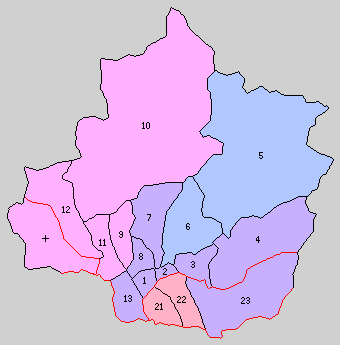
Historic Map of Tone District in 1889: 1. Numata, 2. Tonami, 3. Shirasawa, 4. Azuma, 5. Katashina, 6. Kawaba, 7. Ikeda, 8. Usune, 9. Komemaki, 10. Minakami, 11.Momono, 12.Yunohara, 13. Kawata, 21. Kuroho, 22. Itonose, 23. Akagine, +. Kuga

- April 1, 1889 – With the establishment of the municipalities system, the town of Numata and the villages of Tonami, Ikeda, Usune, Kawada, Shirasawa, Kawaba, Komemaki, Momono, Azuma, Yunohara, Katashina, and Minakami were placed within the district. (1 town, 12 villages)
- April 1, 1896 (1 town, 16 villages)
  - Absorbed Kitaseta District. The villages of Kuroho, Itonose (now the village of Shōwa), and Akagine (now the city of Numata).
  - The village of Kuga, Agatsuma District, moved to Tone District.
- May 1, 1908 - The villages of Kuga and Yunohara merged to form the village of Niiharu. (1 town, 15 villages)
- October 10, 1947 - The village of Minakami gained town status. (2 towns, 14 villages)
- April 1, 1954 - The town of Numata and the villages of Tonami, Ikeda, Usune, and Kawada merged to form the city of Numata. (1 town, 10 villages)
- April 1, 1955 - The villages of Komemaki and Monono merged to form the town of Tsukiyono. (2 towns, 8 villages)
- September 30, 1956 - The villages of Azuma and Akagine merged to form the village of Tone. (2 towns, 7 villages)
- November 1, 1958 - The villages of Kuroho and Itonose merged to form the village of Shōwa. (2 towns, 6 villages)
- February 13, 2005 - The villages of Shirasawa and Tone merged into the city of Numata. (2 towns, 4 villages)
- October 1, 2005 - The towns of Tsukiyono and (former) Minakami, and the village of Niiharu merged to form the town of Minakami. (1 town, 3 villages)
