= Pet leasing =

Pet leasing is the practice of leasing a pet, usually a dog, to a customer on a contract basis. The practice is controversial, because some customers believed they were taking out loans to buy a pet when, in fact, they were only leasing an animal that could be repossessed by the lender in the event that payments were not kept up.

The process of leasing a pet typically starts in a retail pet store, but the loan is made by a third-party contractor. The revenue model for pet leasing is the same as car leasing. The borrower enters a contract, typically for two years, and agrees to monthly payments. The lender typically requires proof of income, which may be as low as $1000 a month.

== Controversy ==
The state governments of New York, California, Nevada, Washington, Indiana, Virginia and New Jersey have banned pet leasing. And a similar ban on pet leasing has passed the Rhode Island state house of representatives. In Connecticut, State Senate Republican President Pro Tempore Len Fasano has introduced legislation that would similarly ban pet leasing in his state. Dog leasing is illegal in Massachusetts.

According to several news sources, some lessees of pets believed they were buying their pets and were surprised to discover that they were only on loan.

The American Kennel Club "supports a ban on predatory pet leasing schemes that victimize potential owners, undermine a lifetime commitment to a pet, and do not confer the rights and responsibilities associated with legal ownership of a pet." Pet leasing has also been decried by the American Society for the Prevention of Cruelty to Animals (ASPCA), which has called for a state-by-state ban.
