= Tsukiyono, Gunma =

Dissolved municipality in Gunma prefecture, Japan

Coordinates: 36°41′N 138°59′E

Tsukiyono (月夜野町, Tsukiyono-machi) was a town located in Tone District, Gunma Prefecture, Japan.

On October 1, 2005, Tsukiyono, along with the village of Niiharu (also from Tone District), was merged into the expanded town of Minakami.
