= Shirasawa, Gunma =

Dissolved municipality in Gunma prefecture, Japan

Shirasawa (白沢村, Shirasawa-mura) was a village located in Tone District, Gunma Prefecture, Japan.

== Population ==
As of 2003, the village had an estimated population of 3,736 and a density of 132.67 persons per km^{2}. The total area was 28.16 km^{2}.

== History ==
On February 13, 2005, Shirasawa, along with the village of Tone (also from Tone District), was merged into the expanded city of Numata.
