= Shōwa, Gunma =

Shōwa 昭和村
- Village
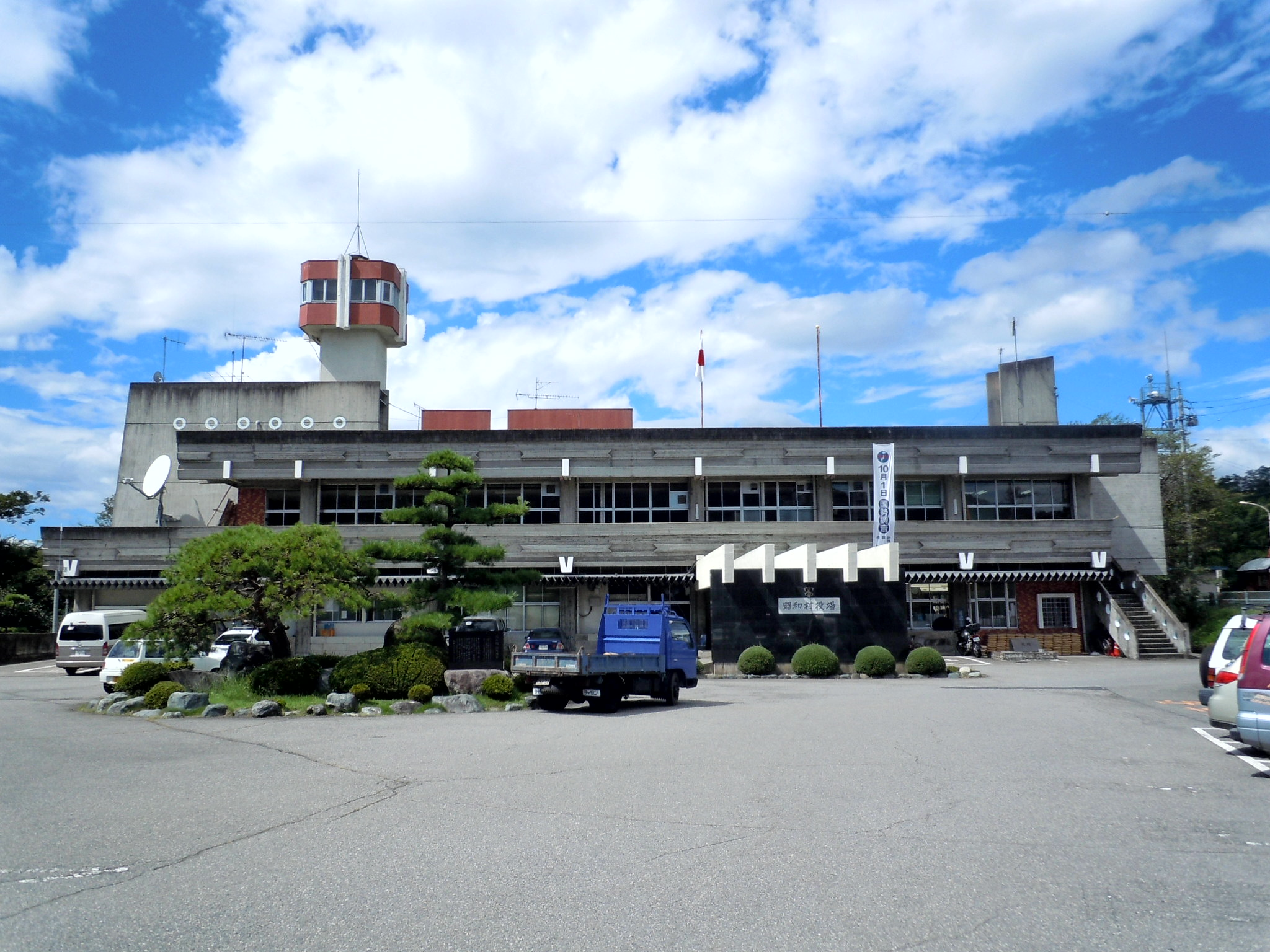
- Shōwa village office

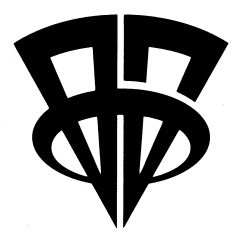
- Flag Seal

- Location of Shōwa in Gunma Prefecture

- Coordinates: 36°38′23.1″N 139°3′57.2″E
- Country: Japan
- Region: Kantō
- Prefecture: Gunma
- District: Tone

Area
  - Total: 64.14 km^{2} (24.76 sq mi)

Population (October 2020)
  - Total: 7,228
  - Density: 112.7/km^{2} (291.9/sq mi)
- Time zone: UTC+9 (Japan Standard Time)
- City symbols
  - Tree: Sakura
  - Flower: Azalea
  - Bird: Green pheasant
- Phone number: 0278-24-5111
- Address: 388 Itoi, Shōwa-mura, Tone-gun, Gunma-ken 379-1298
- Website: Official website

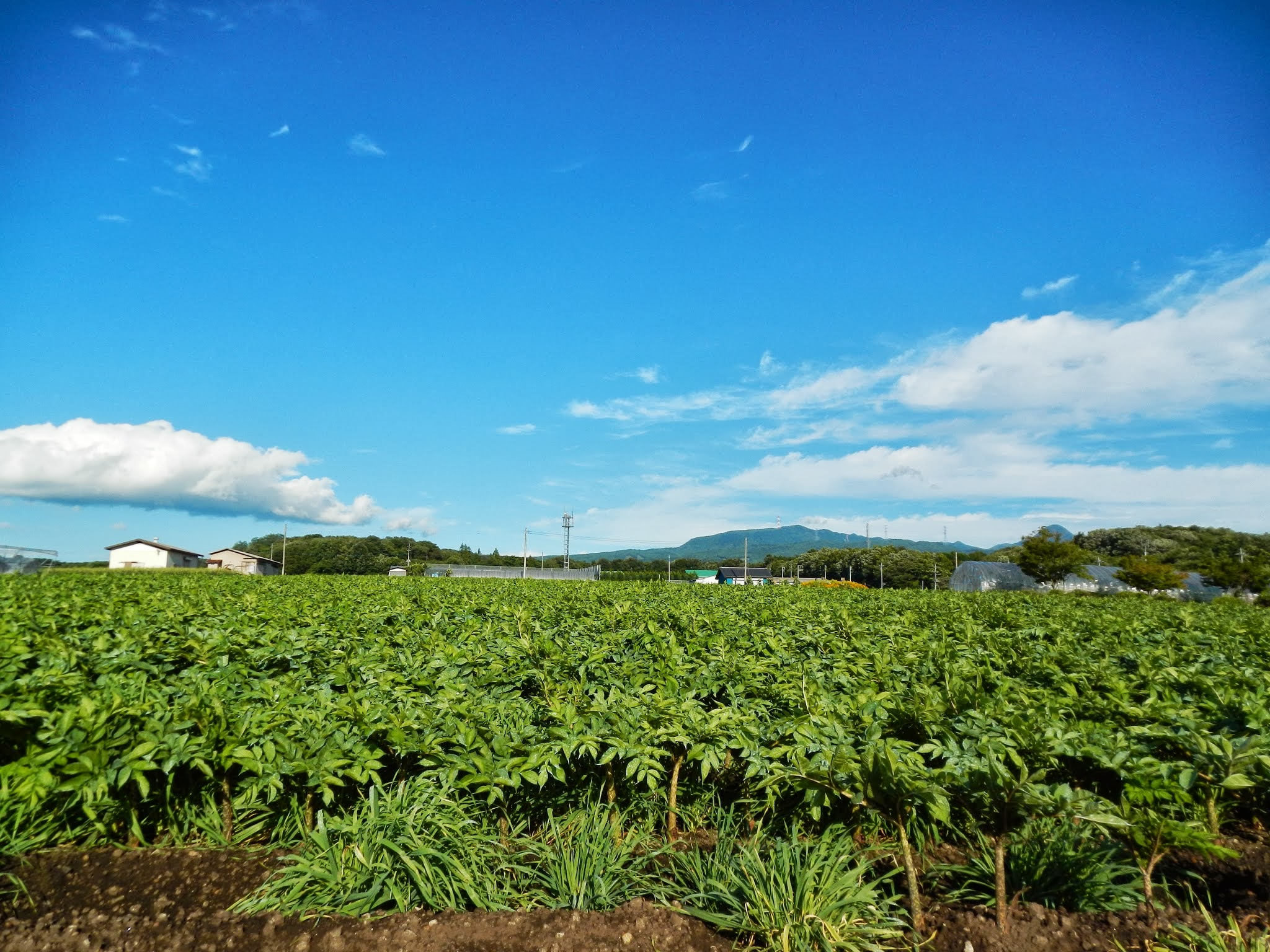
Morishita area of Showa

Shōwa (昭和村, Shōwa-mura) is a village located in Gunma Prefecture, Japan. As of 1 October 2020, the village had an estimated population of 7,228 in 2751 households, and a population density of 110 persons per km^{2}. The total area of the village is 64.14 square kilometres (24.76 sq mi).

== Geography ==
Located in central Gunma, Shōwa is on the northwestern slopes of Mt. Akagi, it is surrounded on the north, east, and west by the city of Numata and borders Shibukawa to the south. The Katashina River and the Tone River flow through the village.

=== Surrounding municipalities ===
Gunma Prefecture

- Numata
- Shibukawa

=== Climate ===
Shōwa has a humid continental climate (Köppen Cfa) characterized by warm summers and cold winters with heavy snowfall. The average annual temperature in Shōwa is 10.4 °C. The average annual rainfall is 1589 mm with September as the wettest month. The temperatures are highest on average in August, at around 23.0 °C, and lowest in January, at around -1.6 °C.

== Demographics ==
Per Japanese census data, the population of Shōwa has been in decline over the past 60 years.

Historical population
| Year | Pop. | ±% |
|---|---|---|
| 1960 | 10,266 | — |
| 1970 | 8,590 | −16.3% |
| 1980 | 8,263 | −3.8% |
| 1990 | 8,198 | −0.8% |
| 2000 | 7,878 | −3.9% |
| 2010 | 7,620 | −3.3% |
| 2020 | 6,953 | −8.8% |

== History ==
The area of present-day Shōwa was part of the tenryō holdings in Kōzuke Province administered directly by the Tokugawa shogunate during the Edo period. On April 1, 1889, with the creation of the modern municipalities system after the Meiji Restoration, Kuroho and Itonose villages were established within Kitaseta District, Gunma. In 1896, Kitaseta District and a portion of Agatsuma District were transferred to Tone District, The two villages merged on November 1, 1958, to form Shōwa.

== Government ==
Shōwa has a mayor-council form of government with a directly elected mayor and a unicameral village council of 12 members. Shōwa, together with the other municipalities in Tone District, contributes one member to the Gunma Prefectural Assembly. In terms of national politics, the town is part of Gunma 1st district of the lower house of the Diet of Japan.

== Economy ==
Traditionally, the economy of Shōwa was heavily dependent on agriculture; primarily market gardening.

== Education ==
Shōwa has three public elementary schools and one public middle school operated by the village government. The village does not have a high school.

== Transportation ==
=== Railway ===
Shōwa does not have any passenger railway service. The nearest station is Numata in the neighboring city of Numata.

=== Highway ===
- Jōshin-etsu Expressway – Akagi-Kōgen SA, Shōwa IC
