= Yoshinori Ueda (serial killer) =

Japanese serial killer on death row

- Born: 1955 (age 70–71); Yao, Osaka, Japan
- Conviction: Murder x5
- Penalty: Death

Details
- Victims: 5
- Span of crimes: July – October 1992
- Country: Japan
- State: Nagano
- Date apprehended: January 24, 1994

Yoshinori Ueda (上田宜範, Ueda Yoshinori; born 1955) is a Japanese serial killer who was responsible for the so-called Osaka Dog Lover Murders (大阪愛犬家連続殺人事件), in which five people were poisoned with suxamethonium in Shiojiri, Nagano from 1992 to 1993. Ueda was convicted of the murders and sentenced to death, and is currently awaiting execution on death row.

== Early life ==
Yoshinori Ueda was born in 1955 in Yao, Osaka, the only son of a wealthy couple that owned a liquor store. Little is known about his upbringing, but when he was 30 years old, Ueda was asked by a friend to become a guarantor for a loan of 70 million yen. He agreed to, but after the friend disappeared, Ueda was left to pay the entirety of the loan by himself. Mortified by this, he begged his parents to pay it off, which they did, but then prohibited him from spending the family inheritance without supervision. After this incident, his personality reportedly changed completely.

Ueda began to spend most of his time with his pet dogs, preferring its company to that of other people. One day, he went to the veterinarian for a regular check-up and witnessed another person's puppy being put down with an injection of suxamethonium, a muscle relaxant. Apparently fascinated by the process, Ueda used an excuse to get a small ampule of the substance for his own experimentation.

Some time later, he was told by an acquaintance who worked as a police dog trainer about being a dog breeder. Despite having no knowledge or experience in the trade, Ueda thought that he could make a lot of money from this business, prompting him to rent some farmland in Shiojiri and build a dog breeding ground and training school. Then, presenting himself as an experienced dog trainer, Ueda would place advertisements in magazines, contact investors and approach dog walkers on the street to advertise his services. This tactic worked successfully, as he soon attracted attention from several potential customers.

== Murders ==
Circa August 1991, Ueda befriended Koh Kashiwai, a 22-year-old construction worker from Osaka, to whom he offered a part-time job at his business. On July 27, 1992, Kashiwai told his acquaintances that he was going to attend his part-time job, but was never seen alive again.

In May 1992, Ueda met 25-year-old Hiroshi Seto, an unemployed man from Sakai, while the latter was walking his dog. The two were acquainted, as both had previously worked at a logistics company, and often went out drinking together. One night, Seto revealed to Ueda that he was a homosexual, and on the next day, rumors started to spread about his sexuality. Because of this, Seto confronted Ueda about the rumors, and after the latter declined responsibility for spreading them, the two got into an argument that almost resulted in a fistfight. Apparently angered by the encounter, Ueda contacted Seto sometime in July 1992 and invited him to his training ground on the pretense of making up, whereupon Seto disappeared.

The next victim was 35-year-old Sanpei Fujiwara, an unemployed man from Osaka, whom met Ueda through a magazine for pet dogs and befriended him. In July 1992, he transferred 300,000 yen to Ueda's bank account, all the while planning to visit him at the training ground in Shiojiri. Around August that same year, he gave a final phone call to his ex-wife before vanishing.

Around October 1992, Ueda encountered Sachiko Takahashi, a 47-year-old housewife from Osaka, at a veterinary clinic. Upon offering her his services, she transferred 800,000 yen to his bank account and agreed to go to his training ground one day. She did so on October 25 of that year, but never returned home afterwards.

Around September 1991, Nobuko Shiji, a 47-year-old housewife from Sakai, was approached by Ueda on the street while she was walking her dog. Intrigued by his offer, she left a note on October 29, 1992, that she was going to deliver a puppy to the training ground, but disappeared soon after.

== Investigation and arrest ==
Suspecting that the recent disappearances might be connected, the National Police Agency formed a special unit to investigate them. They eventually linked the victims back to Ueda, resulting in his arrest on January 26, 1994.

Soon after his arrest, Ueda was put under intense scrutiny by the investigators, until he finally confessed to poisoning five of his prospective clients with suxamethonium. According to his confessions, Kashiwai, Fujiwara and Takahashi were killed because they had demanded he return them their money; Shiji was killed after she found Takahashi's body stuffed in the car, and Seto was killed in the aftermath of their argument. The bodies of all five victims were later buried on the training ground in Shiojiri.

== Trial, sentence and imprisonment ==
On February 10, 1995, investigators excavated the training ground and successfully located the remains of all five victims. Due to this, Ueda was charged with five counts of murder and remanded to await trial. At the trial, he pleaded not guilty, claiming that he had been coerced into confessing by the police.

His claims were disregarded, and on March 20, 1998, he was sentenced to death by the Osaka District Court. Ueda then appealed to the Osaka High Court, which upheld the earlier verdict on March 15, 2001. His third and final appeal to the Supreme Court was similarly dismissed on December 15, 2005, finalizing his death sentence. As of July 2022, Ueda remains on death row awaiting execution.

== See also ==
- List of serial killers by country
- Capital punishment in Japan

== Bibliography ==
- 極悪人 [Villains] (in Japanese). Wani Magazine. June 1, 1998. ISBN 4898295835.
- Hirohisa Asahara (March 1, 1998). 実録 戦後殺人事件帳―人を殺したい夜に読む本 [Postwar Murder Casebook: A Book to Read on the Night You Want to Kill] (in Japanese). Aspect. ISBN 4757200439.
- Keiko Umemoto (December 1, 1998). じゃあ、誰がやったの!―息子を奪われた母の無念 単行本 [Then who did it? - The regret of a mother who lost her son] (in Japanese). Subaru Publishing. ISBN 4806405922.
- Keiko Umemoto (May 1, 2007). 息子はもう帰らない!―大阪・愛犬家連続殺人事件13年目の結審 単行本 [My son is not coming home! - 13 years after the conclusion of the Osaka Dog Lover Murders] (in Japanese). Seifudo Publishing. ISBN 978-4883134694.
