= Kitaseta District, Gunma =

Former district in Gunma prefecture, Japan

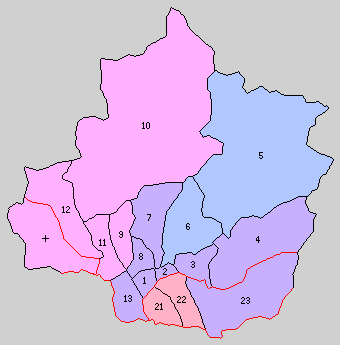
Historic Map of Tone District in 1889: 1. Numata, 2. Tonami, 3. Shirasawa, 4. Azuma, 5. Katashina, 6. Kawaba, 7. Ikeda, 8. Usune, 9. Komemaki, 10. Minakami, 11.Momono, 12.Yunohara, 13. Kawata, 21. Kuroho, 22. Itonose, 23. Akagine, +. Kuga; Areas 21, 22 and 23 were Kitaseta District

Kitaseta District (北勢多郡, Kitaseta-gun) was formerly a rural district located in Gunma Prefecture, Japan. The district is now divided between the city of Numata and the village of Shōwa.

Kitaseta District was created on December 7, 1878, with the reorganization of Gunma Prefecture into districts. It included nine villages, which were formerly part of the tenryō holdings of the Tokugawa shogunate in Kōzuke Province, three villages under the control of Maebashi Domain and three villages under joint control. With the establishment of the municipalities system on April 1, 1889, the area was organized into three villages (Kuroho, Itonose, Akagine).

On April 1, 1896, the district was merged with Tone District.
