= Tone, Gunma =

Dissolved municipality in Gunma prefecture, Japan

Tone (利根村, Tone-mura) was a village located in Tone District, Gunma Prefecture, Japan.

As of 2003, the village had an estimated population of 5,025 and a density of 18.02 persons per km^{2}. The total area was 278.90 km^{2}.

On February 13, 2005, Tone, along with the village of Shirasawa (also from Tone District), was merged into the expanded city of Numata.
