= Minakami, Gunma =

Minakami みなかみ町
- Town
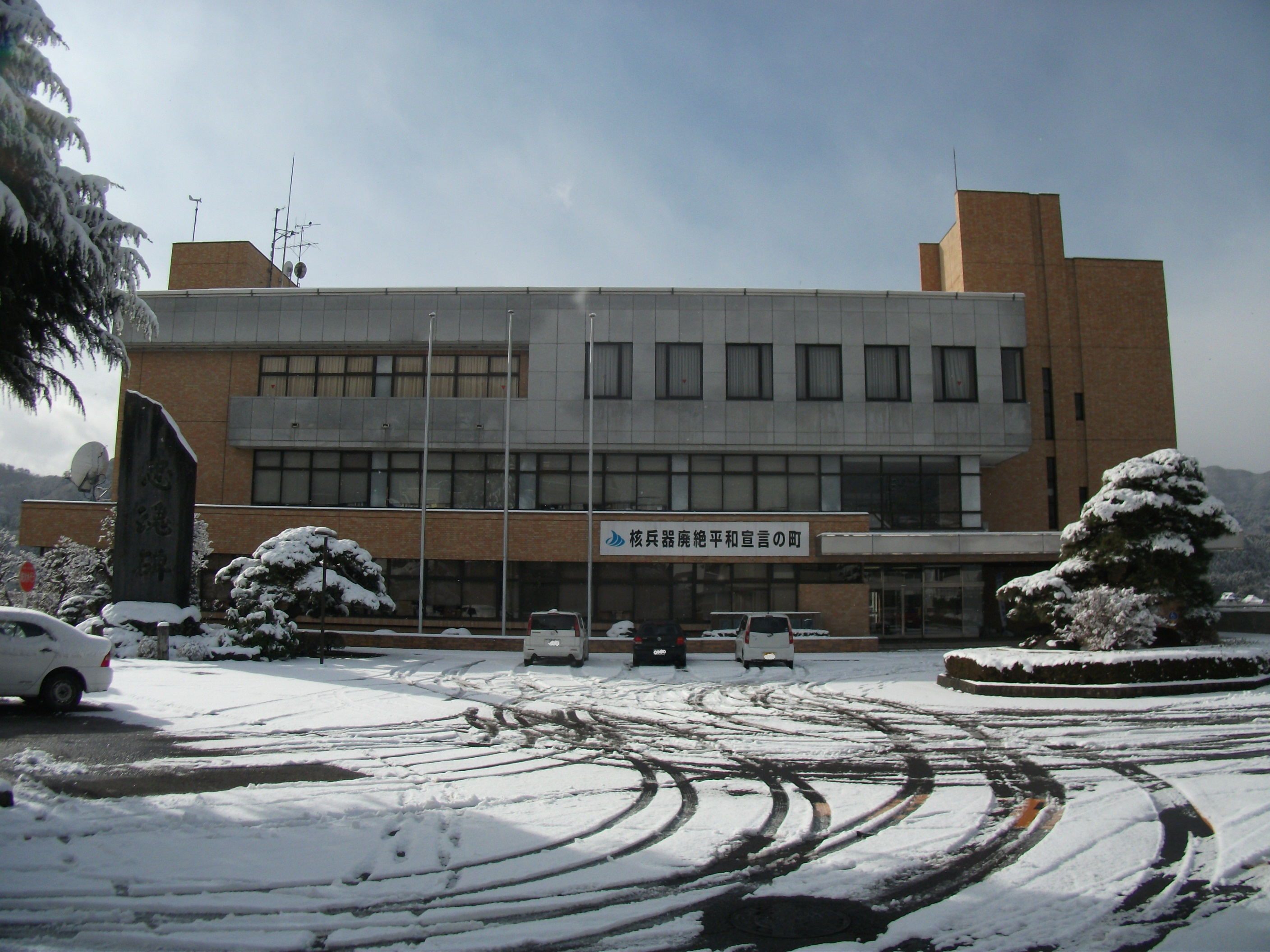
- Minakami town hall

- Flag Seal

- Location of Minakami in Gunma Prefecture

- Coordinates: 36°40′42.8″N 138°59′56.9″E
- Country: Japan
- Region: Kantō
- Prefecture: Gunma
- District: Tone

Area
  - Total: 781.08 km^{2} (301.58 sq mi)

Population (August 2015)
  - Total: 18,383
  - Density: 23.535/km^{2} (60.956/sq mi)
- Time zone: UTC+9 (Japan Standard Time)
- Phone number: 0278-62-2111
- Address: 318 Gokan, Minakami-machi, Tone-gun, Gunma-ken 379-1393
- Climate: Cfa/Dfa
- Website: Official website
- Symbols
- Bird: Japanese bush-warbler
- Flower: Kerria japonica
- Tree: Siebold’s beech

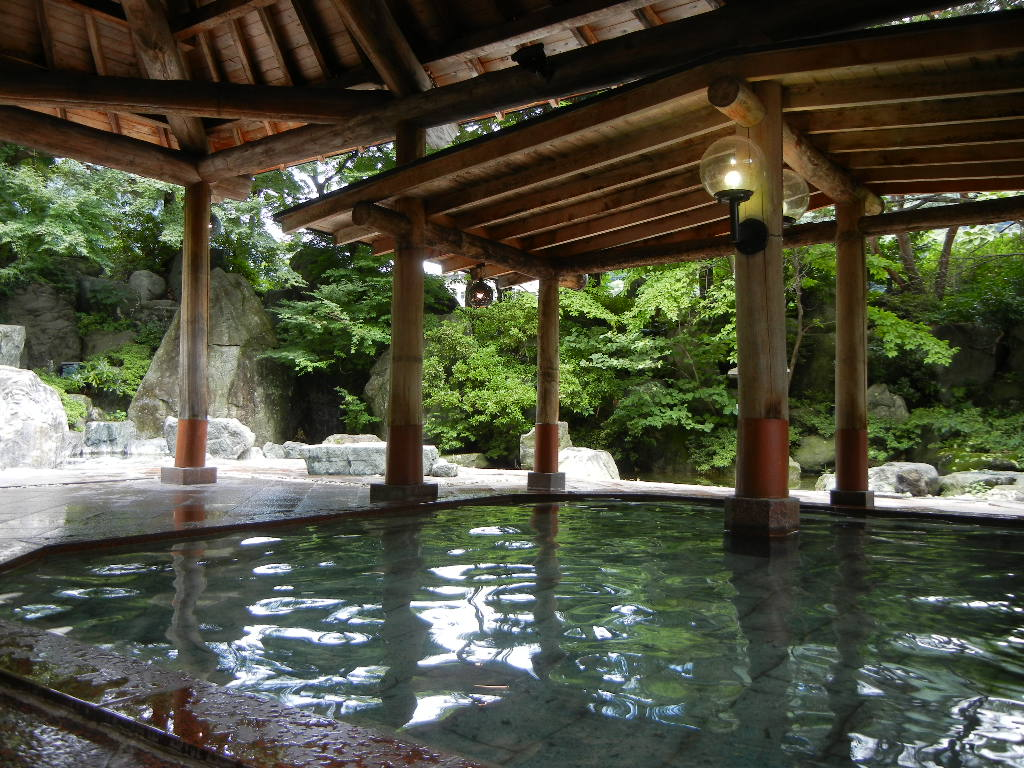
Minakami hot spring Matsunoi

Minakami (みなかみ町, Minakami-machi) is a town located in Gunma Prefecture, Japan. As of 31 October 2020, the town had an estimated population of 18,383 in 7938 households, and a population density of 24 persons per km^{2}. The total area of the town is 781.08 square kilometres (301.58 sq mi). Much of the town is within the borders of Jōshin'etsu-kōgen National Park.

== Geography ==
Located in northern Gunma, Minakami is bordered by Niigata Prefecture to the north. The town is very mountainous.

- Mountains: Mount Mikuni (1636 m), Mount Sennokura (2026 m), Mount Ōmine, Mount Tanigawa (1977 m), Asahidake (1945 m), Mount Hiragatake (2141 m)
- Rivers: Tone River, Akatani River
- Lakes: Lake Okutone, Lake Naramata, Lake Fujiwara, Lake Dogen
- Dams: Yagisawa Dam, Naramata Dam, Fujiwara Dam, Aimata Dam, Sudagai Dam, Takatsudo Dam

=== Surrounding municipalities ===
Gunma Prefecture

- Katashina
- Kawaba
- Nakanojō
- Numata

Niigata Prefecture

- Minamiuonuma
- Uonuma
- Yuzawa

== Climate ==
Minakami has a Humid continental climate (Köppen Dfa) characterized by warm summers and cold winters with heavy snowfall. The average annual temperature in Minakami is 6.8 °C. The average annual rainfall is 1864 mm with September as the wettest month. The temperatures are highest on average in August, at around 18.6 °C, and lowest in January, at around -5.2 °C.

Climate data for Minakami (1991–2020 normals, extremes 1977–present)
Month	Jan	Feb	Mar	Apr	May	Jun	Jul	Aug	Sep	Oct	Nov	Dec	Year
Record high °C (°F)	12.6 (54.7)	17.8 (64.0)	23.6 (74.5)	29.8 (85.6)	31.9 (89.4)	34.8 (94.6)	36.6 (97.9)	35.8 (96.4)	34.5 (94.1)	28.2 (82.8)	24.3 (75.7)	20.9 (69.6)	36.6 (97.9)
Mean daily maximum °C (°F)	2.6 (36.7)	3.5 (38.3)	7.4 (45.3)	14.4 (57.9)	20.2 (68.4)	23.3 (73.9)	27.0 (80.6)	28.2 (82.8)	23.6 (74.5)	17.8 (64.0)	12.1 (53.8)	5.8 (42.4)	15.5 (59.9)
Daily mean °C (°F)	−1.2 (29.8)	−0.8 (30.6)	2.3 (36.1)	8.2 (46.8)	14.0 (57.2)	18.0 (64.4)	21.8 (71.2)	22.7 (72.9)	18.8 (65.8)	12.7 (54.9)	6.7 (44.1)	1.4 (34.5)	10.4 (50.7)
Mean daily minimum °C (°F)	−4.4 (24.1)	−4.3 (24.3)	−1.6 (29.1)	3.1 (37.6)	8.5 (47.3)	13.6 (56.5)	18.0 (64.4)	19.0 (66.2)	15.3 (59.5)	9.1 (48.4)	2.8 (37.0)	−1.7 (28.9)	6.4 (43.5)
Record low °C (°F)	−12.2 (10.0)	−14.1 (6.6)	−13.1 (8.4)	−6.8 (19.8)	−0.5 (31.1)	5.2 (41.4)	10.8 (51.4)	10.7 (51.3)	4.6 (40.3)	−1.0 (30.2)	−7.1 (19.2)	−11.1 (12.0)	−14.1 (6.6)
Average precipitation mm (inches)	154.9 (6.10)	125.9 (4.96)	114.0 (4.49)	99.7 (3.93)	114.5 (4.51)	152.0 (5.98)	215.8 (8.50)	210.6 (8.29)	199.9 (7.87)	140.5 (5.53)	90.9 (3.58)	144.9 (5.70)	1,754.8 (69.09)
Average snowfall cm (inches)	296 (117)	241 (95)	145 (57)	30 (12)	0 (0)	0 (0)	0 (0)	0 (0)	0 (0)	0 (0)	11 (4.3)	187 (74)	906 (357)
Average precipitation days (≥ 1.0 mm)	18.7	15.2	15.0	11.8	12.0	14.5	16.1	15.4	14.0	12.3	12.0	16.1	173.3
Mean monthly sunshine hours	81.1	96.7	134.9	167.3	192.1	145.1	144.6	165.1	126.5	127.4	115.7	103.6	1,600.2
Source: Japan Meteorological Agency (1991–2020 normals, extremes 1977–present)

Climate data for Fujiwara, Minakami (1991–2020 normals, extremes 1977–present)
Month	Jan	Feb	Mar	Apr	May	Jun	Jul	Aug	Sep	Oct	Nov	Dec	Year
Record high °C (°F)	11.7 (53.1)	15.8 (60.4)	20.5 (68.9)	28.1 (82.6)	32.2 (90.0)	32.6 (90.7)	34.1 (93.4)	35.0 (95.0)	32.6 (90.7)	27.8 (82.0)	24.4 (75.9)	21.5 (70.7)	35.0 (95.0)
Mean daily maximum °C (°F)	1.4 (34.5)	2.3 (36.1)	6.0 (42.8)	12.8 (55.0)	19.6 (67.3)	22.8 (73.0)	26.2 (79.2)	27.3 (81.1)	22.9 (73.2)	17.1 (62.8)	11.2 (52.2)	4.6 (40.3)	14.5 (58.1)
Daily mean °C (°F)	−2.5 (27.5)	−2.2 (28.0)	0.9 (33.6)	6.3 (43.3)	12.7 (54.9)	17.0 (62.6)	20.8 (69.4)	21.6 (70.9)	17.7 (63.9)	11.6 (52.9)	5.5 (41.9)	0.2 (32.4)	9.1 (48.4)
Mean daily minimum °C (°F)	−6.2 (20.8)	−6.3 (20.7)	−3.3 (26.1)	1.2 (34.2)	6.8 (44.2)	12.4 (54.3)	17.0 (62.6)	17.8 (64.0)	14.0 (57.2)	7.5 (45.5)	1.2 (34.2)	−3.3 (26.1)	4.9 (40.8)
Record low °C (°F)	−15.4 (4.3)	−16.6 (2.1)	−16.7 (1.9)	−9.5 (14.9)	−2.3 (27.9)	3.1 (37.6)	8.7 (47.7)	9.2 (48.6)	3.1 (37.6)	−4.0 (24.8)	−10.2 (13.6)	−14.1 (6.6)	−16.7 (1.9)
Average precipitation mm (inches)	219.4 (8.64)	163.2 (6.43)	124.1 (4.89)	89.6 (3.53)	105.2 (4.14)	130.3 (5.13)	191.3 (7.53)	185.0 (7.28)	176.3 (6.94)	136.4 (5.37)	104.6 (4.12)	189.8 (7.47)	1,816.2 (71.50)
Average snowfall cm (inches)	348 (137)	272 (107)	183 (72)	69 (27)	2 (0.8)	0 (0)	0 (0)	0 (0)	0 (0)	0 (0)	29 (11)	258 (102)	1,152 (454)
Average precipitation days (≥ 1.0 mm)	21.1	17.9	16.8	13.1	12.3	14.0	15.8	14.5	14.1	12.6	13.8	18.2	183.7
Mean monthly sunshine hours	59.7	74.8	113.4	145.1	194.3	150.7	152.5	182.5	125.8	119.5	104.6	78.5	1,509.6
Source: Japan Meteorological Agency (1991–2020 normals, extremes 1977–present)

== Demographics ==
Per Japanese census data, the population of Minakami has declined steadily over the past 60 years.

Historical population
Year	Pop.	±%
1920	22,083	—
1930	25,192	+14.1%
1940	25,983	+3.1%
1950	31,908	+22.8%
1960	32,605	+2.2%
1970	29,218	−10.4%
1980	28,123	−3.7%
1990	26,540	−5.6%
2000	25,089	−5.5%
2010	21,345	−14.9%
2020	17,195	−19.4%

== History ==
The Mikuni Kaidō connecting Takasaki with Niigata from the Heian period onwards passed through area of present-day Minakami, with nine post stations. The area was contested between the competing Uesugi, Takeda and Sanada clans during the Sengoku period. During the Edo period, it was partly under the control of Numata Domain, with the remainder as part of the tenryō holdings within Kōzuke Province administered directly by the Tokugawa shogunate during the Edo period. On April 1, 1889, with the creation of the modern municipalities system after the Meiji Restoration, Minakami village was established within Tone District, Gunma. It was raised to town status on August 10, 1947. On October 1, 2005, the town of Tsukiyono and the village of Niiharu were merged into Minakami.

== Government ==
Minakami has a mayor-council form of government with a directly elected mayor and a unicameral town council of 18 members. Minakami, together with the other municipalities in Tone District, contributes one member to the Gunma Prefectural Assembly. In terms of national politics, the town is part of Gunma 1st district of the lower house of the Diet of Japan.

== Economy ==
The economy of Minakami is heavily dependent on seasonal tourism to ski resorts and to onsen hot springs.

== Education ==
Minakami has six public elementary schools and three public middle school operated by the town government, and one public high school operated by the Gunma Prefectural Board of Education.

== Transportation ==
=== Railway ===
JR East – Jōetsu Shinkansen

- Jōmō-Kōgen

JR East – Jōetsu Line

- Gokan - Kamimoku - Minakami - Yubiso - Doai

== Highways ==
- Kan-etsu Expressway – Tsukiyono IC, Minakami IC
- National Route 17
- National Route 291

== International relations ==
- - Huntsville, Texas, United States, sister city since April 1991 with former Niihari village
- - Uherský Brod, Czech Republic, sister city since November 1995 with former Tsukiyono town
- (Taiwan) – Tainan, Republic of China, friendship city since December 2013

== Local attractions ==
=== Onsen (Hot Springs) ===
Minakami has traditionally been an Onsen (hot spring) resort town with 8 major onsen sources and over 40 different bathing facilities to choose from.

=== Ski areas ===
Minakami has a good reputation for good snow conditions. There are nine ski areas:

- Akazawa Ski Area
- Kanosawa Ski Area
- Minakami Houdaigi
- Minakami Kogen
- Minakami Kogen Fujiwara
- Norn Minakami
- Oana
- Tanigawa Onsen White Valley
- Tanigawadake Tenjindaira

=== Outdoor ===
There are many different outdoor pursuits available in Minakami and it has become a very popular destination for outdoor adventure seekers. Some of the outdoor activities include:

- Back country ski & snowboarding
- Bungy Jumping
- Canoeing
- Canyoning
- Caving
- Hiking
- Kayaking
- Mountain biking
- Paragliding
- Rock climbing
- Snowshoe
- Whitewater rafting (grade 2- 4)

=== Other ===
Known for having the deepest railway platform in Japan, Doai Station is frequently visited by railway enthusiasts and hikers traveling to nearby Mount Tanigawa.

== Noted people from Minakami ==
- Hayato Tamura, professional wrestler
- Kotoinazuma Yoshihiro, sumo wrestler
