= Shanshang (disambiguation) =

Shanshang or variation, may refer to:

Chinese: 山上; pinyin: Shān-Shàng

- Shanshang District (Chinese: 山上區; pinyin: Shānshàng Qū; Pe̍h-ōe-jī: San-siōng-khu), Tainan, Taiwan
- Shanshang Subdialect (Chinese: 山上音; pinyin: Shānshàng Yīn), see Danzhou dialect

== See also ==
- Shang (disambiguation)
- Shan (disambiguation)
- Shanshan (disambiguation)
- Shangshan (disambiguation)
- Sanjo (disambiguation) 山上 (sanjō)
  - Sanjō Station (disambiguation)
- Yamanoue (disambiguation) 山上 (yamanoue)
- Yamagami (disambiguation) 山上 (yamagami)
