= Yamanoue =

Yamanoue (Japanese: やまのうえ, romanized: yamano-ue, 山上, 山於, 山之上, 山の上, 山野上) may refer to:

== People ==
Yamanoue is a Japanese surname. Notable people with this surname include:

- Yamanoue no Okura (山上憶良 or 山於億良; 660-773) Japanese poet
- Yamanoue Sōji (山上宗二; 1544-1590) Japanese tea master
- Yusuke Yamanoue (山野上祐介), an author recognized as "Yamanoue" under the International Code of Zoological Nomenclature; see List of authors of names published under the ICZN

=== Fictional characters ===
- Dr. Yamanoue Hakase (山之上博士) from the Osamu Tezuka anime "ジェッターマルス", Jetter Mars
- Yamanoue Kiyomori, the Lord Of Doom Fist; from the shounen manga comic book "我間乱", Gamaran

== Places ==
- Yamanoue Village (山之上村; Yamanoue-mura), a village that was merged into the Japanese town of Ryūō, Shiga

=== Facilities and structures ===
- Yamanoue Hotel (山の上ホテル; Hilltop Hotel), Chiyoda, Tokyo, Japan; see List of Art Deco architecture
- Yamanoue Stele and Kofun (山上碑及び古墳; Yamanoue hi oyobi kofun) a National Historic Site in Takasaki, Gunma, Japan; see List of Historic Sites of Japan (Gunma)
- Yamanoue Preschool, Nichinan, Hino, Tottori, Japan; see Nichinan, Tottori

== See also ==
- Sanjo (disambiguation) (Japanese: 山上, romanized: sanjō)
  - Sanjō Station (disambiguation)
- Yamagami (disambiguation) (Japanese: 山上, romanized: yamagami)
