= Katashina, Gunma =

Katashina 片品村
- Village
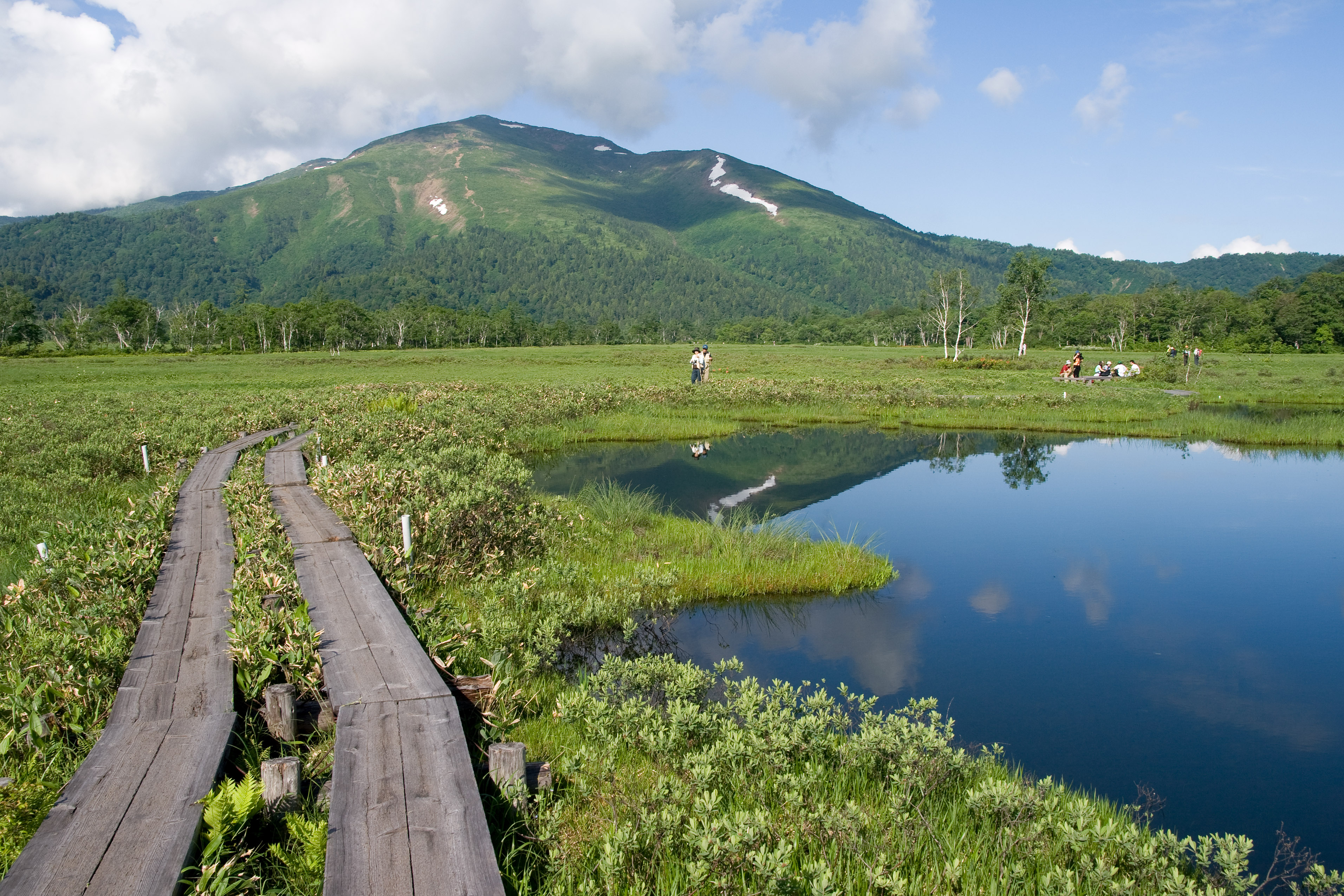
- Oze wetlands, Katashina

- Flag Seal

- Location of Katashina in Gunma Prefecture

- Katashina (Gunma Prefecture)
- Coordinates: 36°46′21″N 139°13′30.8″E
- Country: Japan
- Region: Kantō
- Prefecture: Gunma
- District: Tone

Area
  - Total: 391.76 km^{2} (151.26 sq mi)

Population (October 31, 2020)
  - Total: 4,314
  - Density: 11.01/km^{2} (28.52/sq mi)
- Time zone: UTC+9 (Japan Standard Time)
- City symbols
  - Tree: Silver birch
  - Flower: Asian skunk-cabbage
  - Bird: Copper pheasant
- Phone number: 0278-58-2111
- Address: 3967-3 Kamata, Katashina-mura, Tone-gun, Gunma-ken 378-0498
- Website: Official website

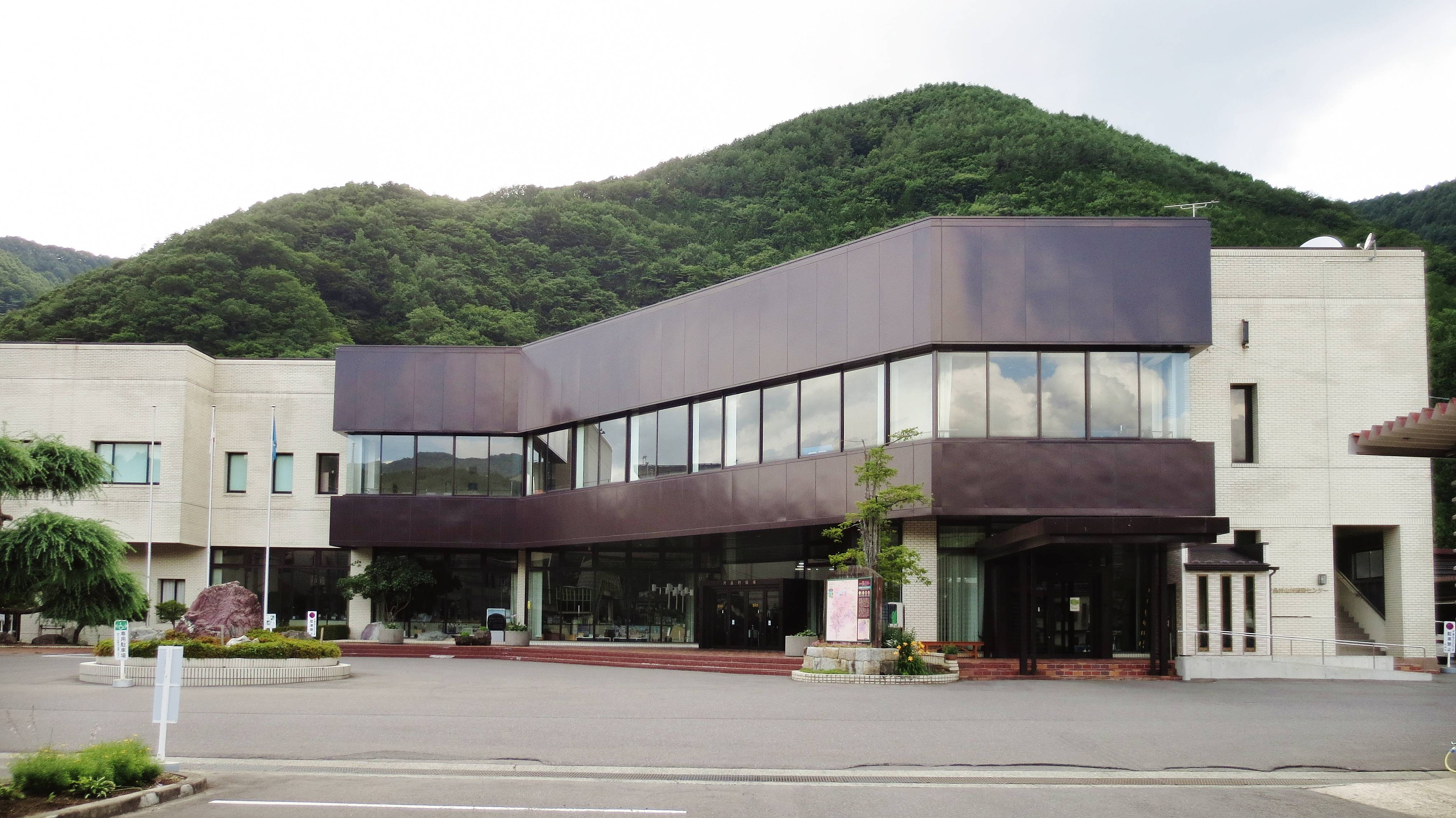
Katashina village office

Katashina (片品村, Katashina-mura) is a village located in Gunma Prefecture, Japan. As of 31 October 2020, the village had an estimated population of 4,314 in 1694 households, and a population density of 11 persons per km^{2}. The total area of the village is 391.76 square kilometres (151.26 sq mi). m^{2}. Much of the village is within the borders of Oze National Park.

== Geography ==
Located in northern Gunma, Katashina is bordered by Tochigi Prefecture to the east and Fukushima Prefecture to the northeast. The village is very mountainous, with the highest elevation being 2578 m and the lowest 640 m. The temperature can reach up to 36 °C in the summer, but in the winter, it can drop to -18 °C. The average temperature is 11 °C, the yearly precipitation is 1042 mm, and amount of snowfall is 95 cm, with the snowy period lasting for 120 days.

- Mountains: Mount Nikkō-Shirane (2578 m), Mount Shibutsu (2228 m), Mount Hotaka (2158m)
- Rivers: Katashina River, Ōtaki River
- Lakes: Marunuma (Maru Swamp), Suganuma

=== Surrounding municipalities ===
Fukushima Prefecture

- Hinoemata

Gunma Prefecture

- Kawaba
- Minakami
- Numata

Niigata Prefecture

- Uonuma

Tochigi Prefecture

- Nikkō

=== Climate ===
Katashina has a humid continental climate (Köppen Dfb) characterized by warm summers and cold winters with heavy snowfall.

Climate data for Katashina
Month	Jan	Feb	Mar	Apr	May	Jun	Jul	Aug	Sep	Oct	Nov	Dec	Year
Average precipitation mm (inches)	55.6 (2.19)	59.1 (2.33)	71.6 (2.82)	75.0 (2.95)	96.1 (3.78)	129.8 (5.11)	165.7 (6.52)	156.1 (6.15)	175.6 (6.91)	103.7 (4.08)	58.8 (2.31)	54.7 (2.15)	1,201.7 (47.31)
Source 1: 理科年表
Source 2: Japan Meteorological Agency (Averages：1981-2010、Peaks：1888-present)

== Demographics ==
Per Japanese census data, the population of Katashina has decreased by more than half over the past 60 years.

Historical population
Year	Pop.	±%
1920	4,363	—
1930	5,803	+33.0%
1940	7,700	+32.7%
1950	8,117	+5.4%
1960	8,491	+4.6%
1970	6,754	−20.5%
1980	6,134	−9.2%
1990	6,109	−0.4%
2000	5,929	−2.9%
2010	4,899	−17.4%
2020	3,993	−18.5%

== History ==
The area of present-day Katashina was part of the tenryō holdings within Kōzuke Province administered directly by the Tokugawa shogunate during the Edo period. On April 1, 1889, with the creation of the modern municipalities system after the Meiji Restoration, Katashina village was established within Tone District, Gunma.

== Government ==
Katashina has a mayor-council form of government with a directly elected mayor and a unicameral village council of ten members. Katashina, together with the other municipalities in Tone District, contributes one member to the Gunma Prefectural Assembly. In terms of national politics, the town is part of Gunma 1st district of the lower house of the Diet of Japan.

== Economy ==
The economy of Katashina is heavily dependent on seasonal tourism to ski resorts and to onsen hot springs.

== Education ==
Katashina has one public elementary school and one public middle school operated by the town government. The town does not have a high school.

== Transportation ==
=== Railways ===
Katashina does not have any passenger railway service.

=== Highways ===
- National Route 120
- National Route 401

== Local attractions ==
- Ca et la Ski Resort Oze (Closed)
- Chigira Farm
- Hanasaku Hot Springs
- Hotaka Bokujo Ski Area
- Katashina Hot Springs
- Katashina Plateau Ski Resort
- Konsei Mountain Pass
- Marunuma Dam
- Marunuma Hot Springs
- Marunuma Plateau Ski Resort
- Oguna Hotaka Ski Area
- Oze Iwakura Ski Area
- Oze Tokura Hot Springs
- Oze Tokura Ski Area
- Ozegahara - Oze National Park
- Shirane Hot Springs
- Sonohara Dam
