= Ozenuma =

Lake in Japan

Lake Ozenuma
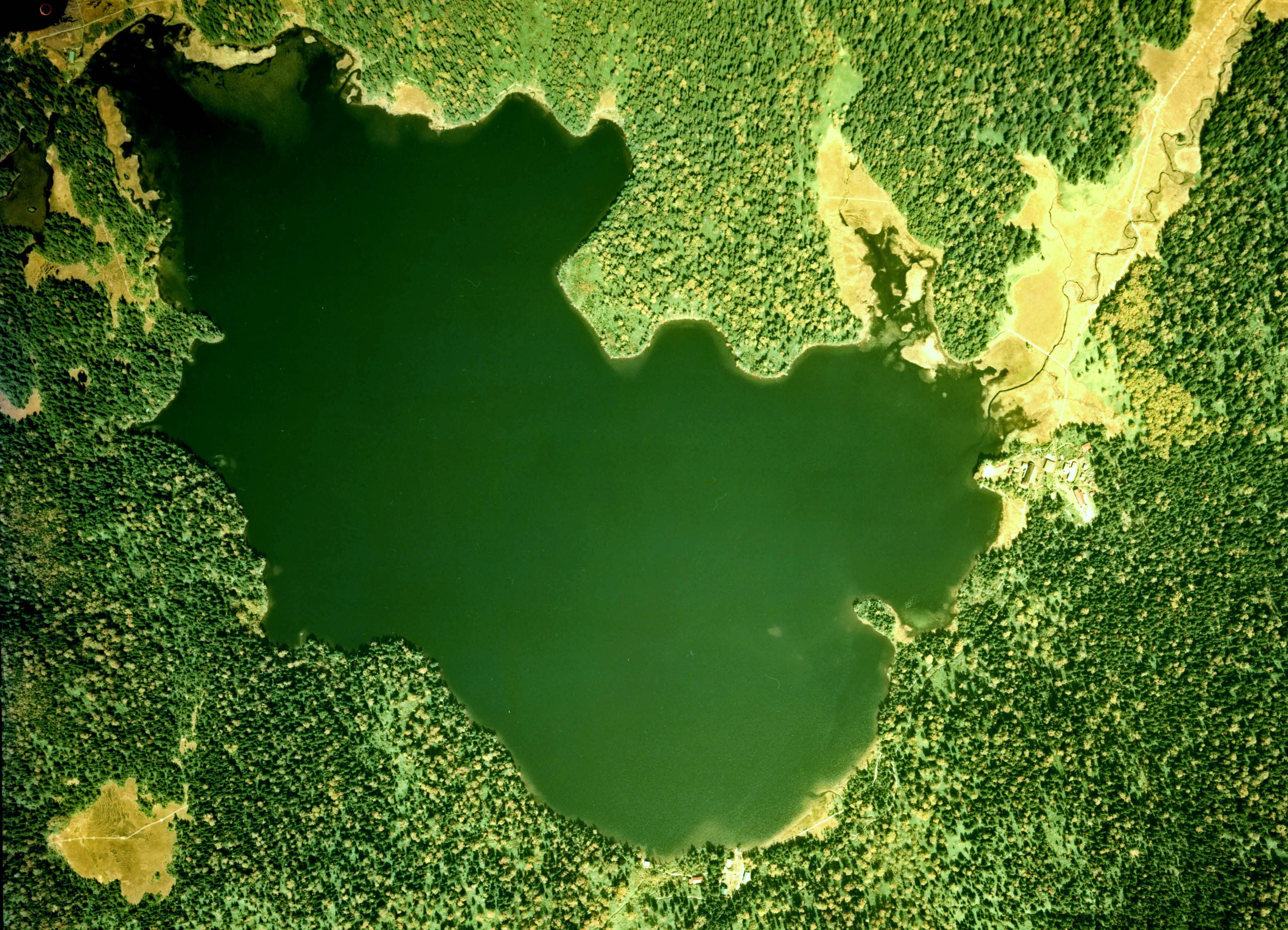

- Location within Japan
- Coordinates: 36°55′39″N 139°18′10″E
- Basin countries: Japan
- Surface area: 1.8 km^{2} (0.69 sq mi)
- Average depth: 4.1 m (13 ft)
- Max. depth: 9.5 m (31 ft)
- Shore length^{1}: 6–9 km (3.7–5.6 mi)
- Surface elevation: 1,660–1,665 m (5,446–5,463 ft)
- ^{1} Shore length is not a well-defined measure.

Ozenuma (尾瀬沼) is a high altitude lake in the Oze National Park, Japan. It is located on the border of Fukushima and Gunma prefectures. In 2005 it was designated as a Ramsar Wetland.

The area of this lake is 1.6-1.84 km2.
