= Hisayoshi Takeda =

Japanese botanist and mountaineer (1883–1972)

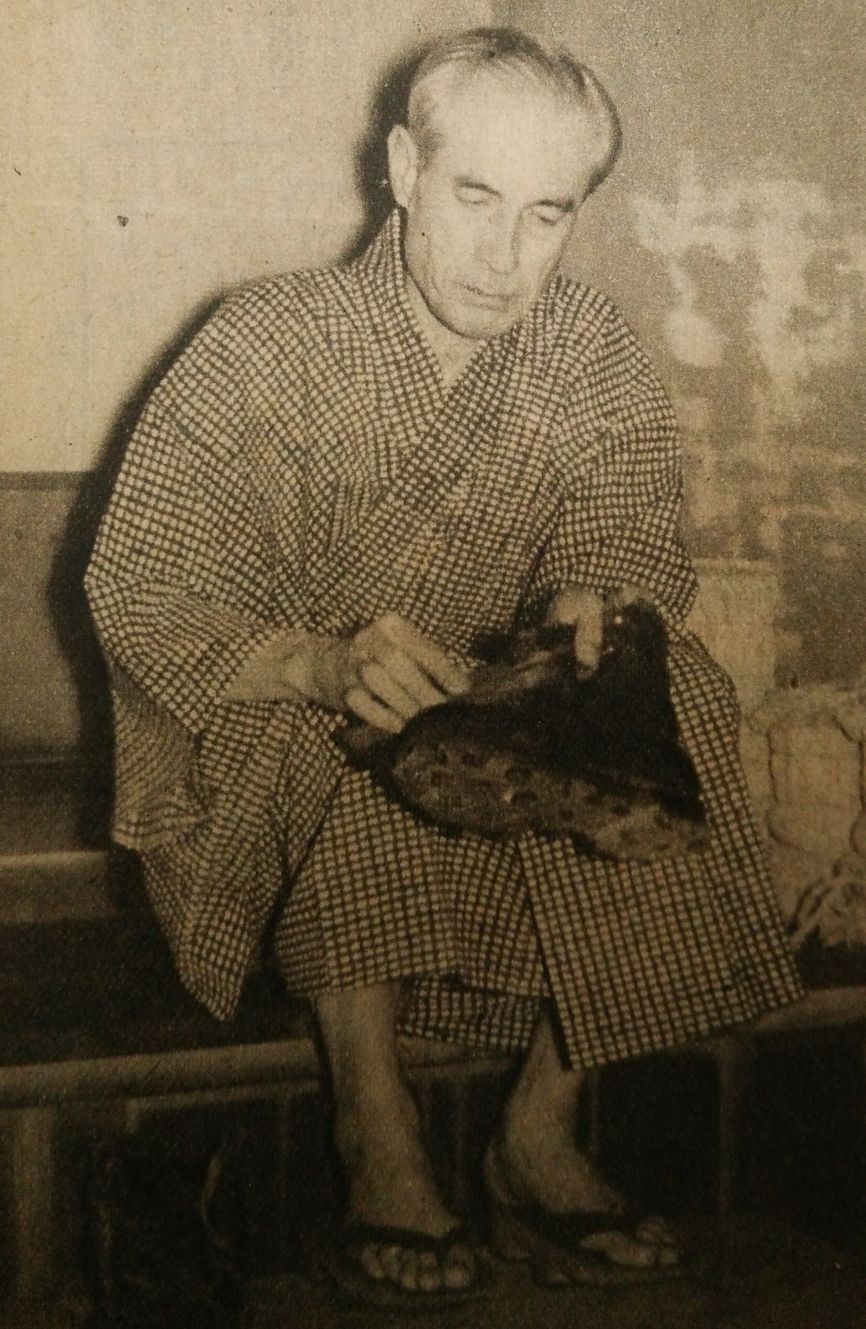
Hisayoshi Takeda

Hisayoshi Takeda (武田 久吉, Takeda Hisayoshi; March 2, 1883 – June 7, 1972) was a Japanese botanist whose father was the British diplomat Sir Ernest Satow. He was a founder of the Japanese Natural History Society, and is known for his campaign to preserve the environment at Oze, which is now Oze National Park.

== Botanist ==
Takeda was born in Tokyo Prefecture, the second son of Satow and his common-law wife, Takeda Kane. He had an early interest in botany collecting plants, for example in Hokkaido, and distributed herbarium specimens in the exsiccata-like series Exsiccatae plantae Yezoenses (1909). Takeda learned English at the Tokyo Foreign Language School (東京外国語学校 (旧制)) before going to the United Kingdom in 1910 to study botany at Kew Gardens in London. Takeda returned home in 1913 before returning to England in 1915 to continue his studies at the University of Birmingham. A year later he visited the island of Shikotan to conduct plant research as part of his doctorate. In 1916 he became a lecturer at Kyoto University before joining Hokkaido University in 1920. From 1928 to 1939, he returned to Kyoto University where he served as a senior lecturer.

== Mountain conservation ==
Between 1948 and 1951, Takeda served as the sixth Chairman of the Japanese Alpine Club, which was founded in 1905. He was also the chairman of Nature Conservation Society of Japan (日本自然保護協会) until 1970, when he was awarded the Prince Chichibu Memorial Science Prize for his contributions to botany.

Through his research, he campaigned for greater protection of mountain plant species. Takeda, who is known as the "father of Oze", helped establish Oze National Park. The area covers part of Fukushima, Tochigi, Gunma and Niigata Prefectures in Japan. A memorial hall was built in his honor at Hinoemata, Fukushima Prefecture.

== Personal life ==
Takeda was married and had two daughters. He died aged 89 on June 7, 1972.

== Published works ==
- Oze and Kinunuma (1930), Azusa Shobo (尾瀬と鬼怒沼 (1930), 梓書房)
- Climbing and plant (1938) Kawade Shobo (登山と植物 (1938), 河出書房)
- Alpine plant (1941), Ars (高山の植物 (1941), アルス)
- Travelers' companion (1942), Ars, (道祖神 (1942), アルス)
- Folklore and the plant (1948), Yamaoka (民俗と植物 (1948) 山岡書店)
- Oze (1951) Iwanami (尾瀬 (1951), 岩波写真文庫)
- Lofty dream (1956), Yamatokeikokusha (高嶺の花 (1956), 山と渓谷社)
- Primary School Children Picture Book on Japanese Alpine plants (1959), Childcare, Inc (原色日本高山植物図鑑 (1959), 保育社)
- Continued Primary School Children Picture Book on Japanese Alpine plants (1964), Childcare, Inc (原色日本高山植物図鑑 (1964), 保育社)
