= Hinoemata, Fukushima =

Hinoemata 檜枝岐村
- Village
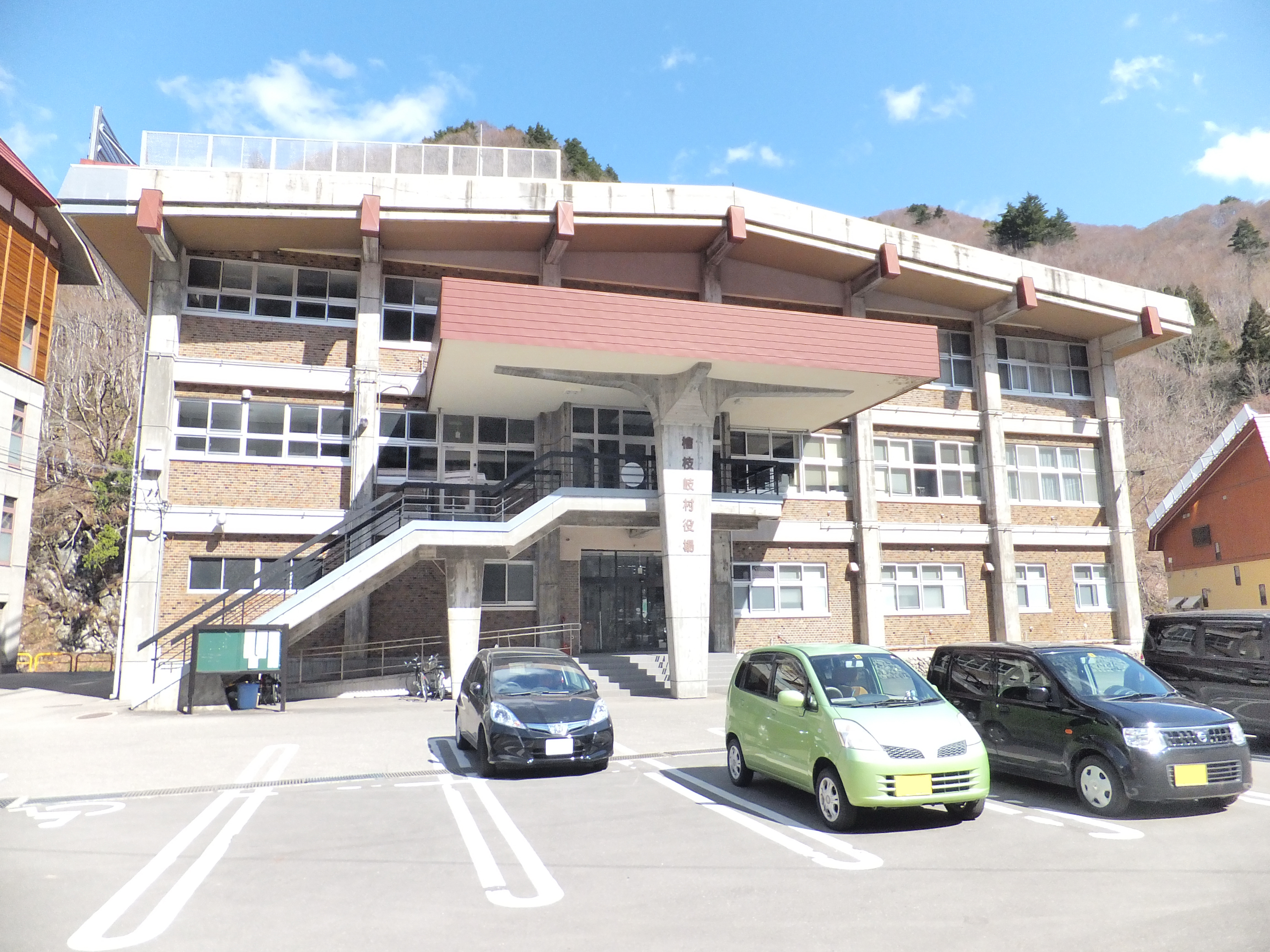
- Hinoemata Village Hall

- Flag Seal

- Location of Hinoemata in Fukushima Prefecture

- Coordinates: 37°1′26.9″N 139°23′20.2″E
- Country: Japan
- Region: Tōhoku
- Prefecture: Fukushima
- District: Minamiaizu

Area
  - Total: 390.46 km^{2} (150.76 sq mi)

Population (October 2025)
  - Total: 475
  - Density: 1.22/km^{2} (3.15/sq mi)
- Time zone: UTC+9 (Japan Standard Time)
- Phone number: 0241-75-2311
- Address: 880 Shimonohara, Hinoemata-mura, Minamiaizu-gun, Fukushima-ken 967-0525
- Climate: Dfb
- Website: Official website
- Symbols
- Flower: Asian skunk cabbage
- Tree: Chamaecyparis obtusa

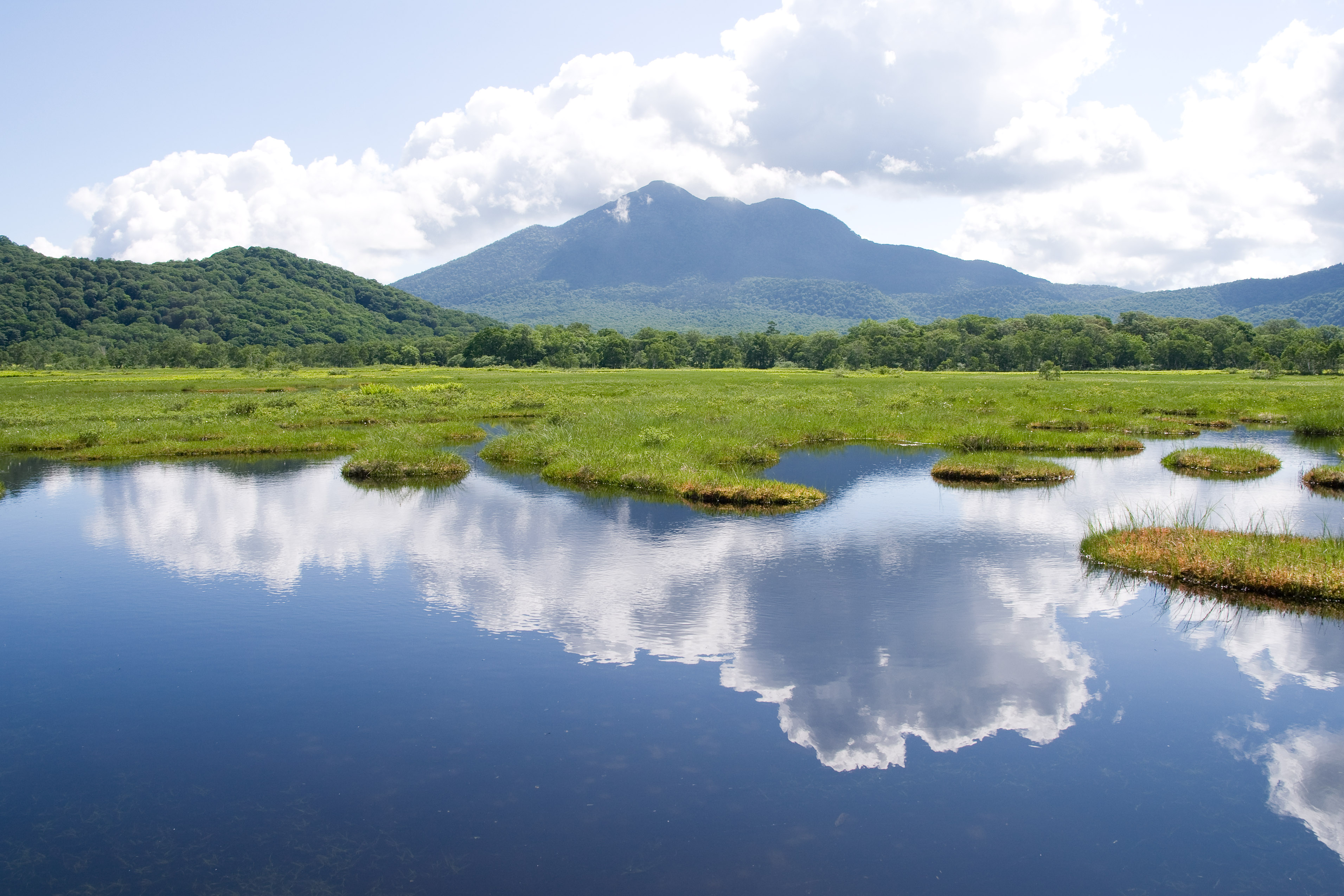
Hiuchigatake (2356 m) and Ozegahara

Hinoemata (檜枝岐村, Hinoemata-mura) is a village located in Fukushima Prefecture, Japan. As of 1 October 2025, the village had an estimated population of 475, and a population density of 1.217 persons per km². The total area of the village is 390.46 square kilometres (150.76 sq mi). It is locally famous for its soba (buckwheat noodles) and known nationally for its kabuki performances and as a gateway to the Oze marshlands.

== Geography ==
Located in the southwestern corner of Fukushima prefecture, Hinoemata is surrounded by the mountains Komagatake, Mount Taishaku, and Hiuchigatake (the highest mountain in northwestern Japan). Between these mountains runs the Hinoemata River. It is known for having the lowest population density of any municipality in Japan.

- Mountains: Aizu-Komagatake (2133 m), Mount Taishaku (2060 m), Hiuchigatake (2356 m)
- Rivers: Hinoemata River
- Lakes: Ozegahara

=== Neighboring municipalities ===
- Fukushima Prefecture
  - Minamiaizu
  - Tadami
- Gunma Prefecture
  - Katashina
- Niigata Prefecture
  - Uonuma
- Tochigi Prefecture
  - Nikkō

== Climate ==
Hinoemata has a humid continental climate (Köppen Dfb) characterized by warm summers and cold winters with heavy snowfall. The average annual temperature in Hinoemata is 6.5 °C. The average annual rainfall is 1050 mm with September as the wettest month. The temperatures are highest on average in August, at around 19.2 °C, and lowest in January, at around -5.2 °C.

Climate data for Hinoemata (1991–2020 normals, extremes 1978–present)
Month	Jan	Feb	Mar	Apr	May	Jun	Jul	Aug	Sep	Oct	Nov	Dec	Year
Record high °C (°F)	10.3 (50.5)	14.0 (57.2)	18.7 (65.7)	25.6 (78.1)	29.6 (85.3)	31.2 (88.2)	32.5 (90.5)	32.5 (90.5)	31.1 (88.0)	26.9 (80.4)	22.1 (71.8)	19.7 (67.5)	32.5 (90.5)
Mean daily maximum °C (°F)	−0.1 (31.8)	0.9 (33.6)	4.8 (40.6)	11.5 (52.7)	18.5 (65.3)	21.8 (71.2)	25.2 (77.4)	26.3 (79.3)	21.8 (71.2)	15.8 (60.4)	9.7 (49.5)	3.2 (37.8)	13.3 (55.9)
Daily mean °C (°F)	−3.8 (25.2)	−3.5 (25.7)	−0.2 (31.6)	5.3 (41.5)	11.7 (53.1)	15.8 (60.4)	19.6 (67.3)	20.3 (68.5)	16.2 (61.2)	10.1 (50.2)	4.2 (39.6)	−1.0 (30.2)	7.9 (46.2)
Mean daily minimum °C (°F)	−7.6 (18.3)	−7.9 (17.8)	−4.7 (23.5)	0.5 (32.9)	5.6 (42.1)	10.7 (51.3)	15.3 (59.5)	15.9 (60.6)	12.0 (53.6)	5.6 (42.1)	0.0 (32.0)	−4.8 (23.4)	3.4 (38.1)
Record low °C (°F)	−18.7 (−1.7)	−18.2 (−0.8)	−17.0 (1.4)	−10.2 (13.6)	−4.0 (24.8)	2.0 (35.6)	5.4 (41.7)	6.6 (43.9)	−0.2 (31.6)	−5.1 (22.8)	−10.0 (14.0)	−16.0 (3.2)	−18.7 (−1.7)
Average precipitation mm (inches)	131.3 (5.17)	114.9 (4.52)	91.6 (3.61)	80.2 (3.16)	89.5 (3.52)	121.8 (4.80)	207.4 (8.17)	166.9 (6.57)	160.1 (6.30)	155.1 (6.11)	103.8 (4.09)	145.5 (5.73)	1,560 (61.42)
Average snowfall cm (inches)	325 (128)	281 (111)	212 (83)	92 (36)	3 (1.2)	0 (0)	0 (0)	0 (0)	0 (0)	0 (0)	39 (15)	259 (102)	1,221 (481)
Average precipitation days (≥ 1.0 mm)	18.1	16.0	14.9	11.8	11.8	14.0	15.9	13.7	13.1	12.8	14.4	18.4	174.4
Mean monthly sunshine hours	48.8	68.0	106.1	137.2	178.2	132.5	133.5	151.3	115.4	109.8	92.9	64.2	1,337.8
Source: Japan Meteorological Agency (1991–2020 normals, extremes 1978–present)

== Demographics ==
Per Japanese census data, the population of Hinoemata peaked around the year 1960 and since declined to pre-1930 levels.

Historical population
Year	Pop.	±%
1920	463	—
1930	532	+14.9%
1940	691	+29.9%
1950	786	+13.7%
1960	983	+25.1%
1970	851	−13.4%
1980	765	−10.1%
1990	702	−8.2%
1995	727	+3.6%
2000	757	+4.1%
2005	706	−6.7%
2010	637	−9.8%
2015	615	−3.5%
2020	504	−18.0%
2025	475	−5.8%
Hinoemata population statistics

== History ==
The area of present-day Hinoemata was part of ancient Mutsu Province and formed part of the holdings of Aizu Domain during the Edo period. After the Meiji Restoration, it was organized as part of Minamiaizu District in Fukushima Prefecture. Hinoemata was formed on April 1, 1889 with the establishment of the modern municipalities system.

== Economy ==
The economy of Hinoemata is primarily agricultural.

== Education ==
Hinoemata has one public elementary school and one public junior high school operated by the village government.

- Hinoemata Elementary School
- Hinoemata Junior-High School

== Transportation ==
=== Highway ===
- National Route 352
- National Route 401

=== Bus ===
Hinoemata is served by a single local bus line connecting it with Aizukogenozeguchi and Aizu-Tajima stations in neighboring Minami-Aizu Town.

== Local attractions ==
- Hinoemata Hot Spring
- Okutadami Dam (Hinoemata is situated on the east bank of the dam lake.) While half the dam is technically within Hinoemata the dam is not accessible to the public from the Hinoemata side due to mountainous terrain.
- Sanjō Falls
- Takeda Hisayoshi Memorial Hall
