= Hiuchigatake =

Mountain in Japan

Mount Hiuchi
- Hiuchigatake
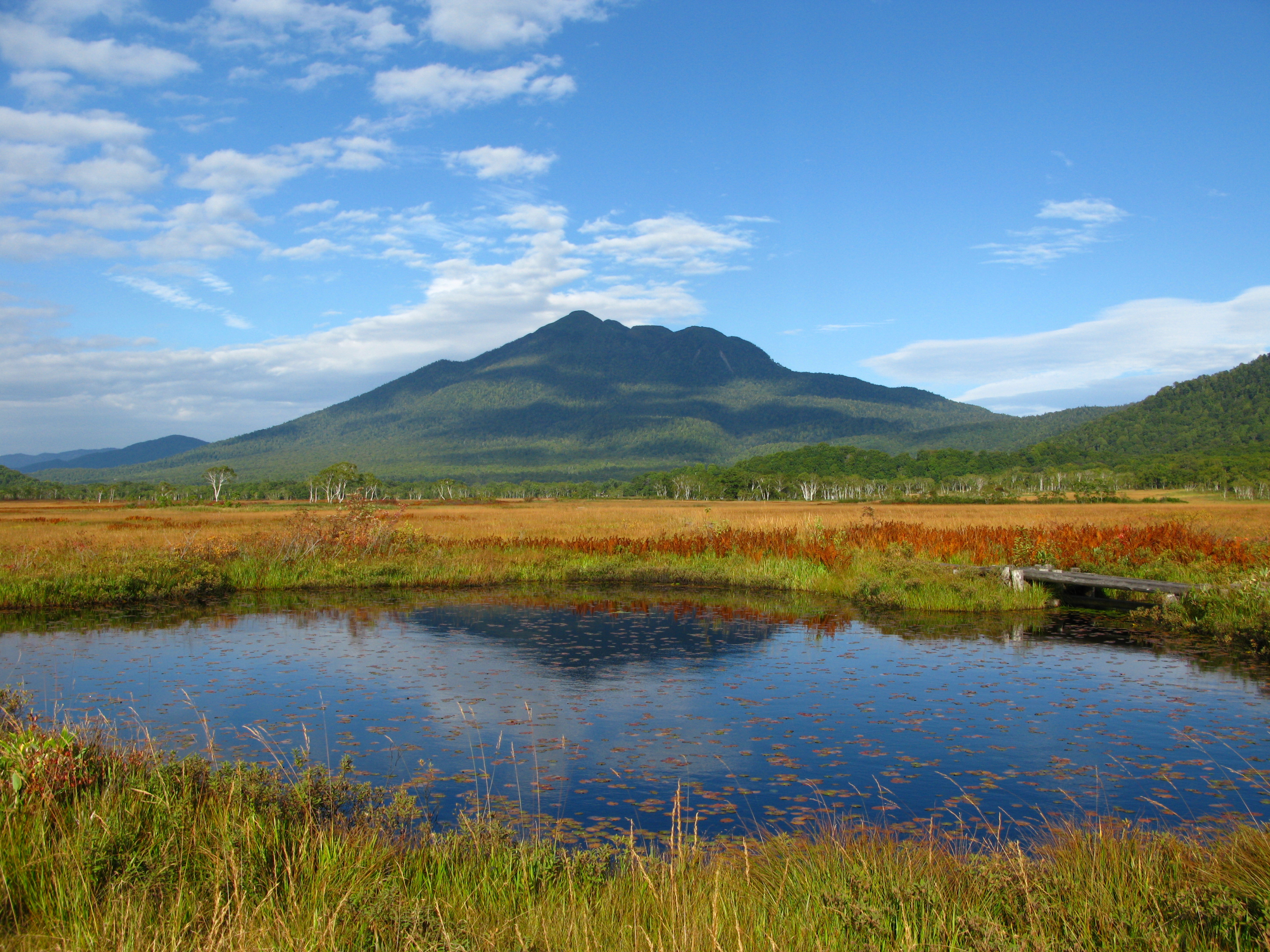

Highest point
- Elevation: 2,356 m (7,730 ft)
- Coordinates: 36°57′7″N 139°17′19″E

Naming
- Native name: 燧ヶ岳 (Japanese)

Geography
- Location within Japan Location within Fukushima Prefecture
- Location: Honshu, Japan

Geology
- Rock age: Quaternary
- Mountain type: Stratovolcano
- Volcanic arc: Northeastern Japan Arc
- Last eruption: July 1544

Mount Hiuchi, also Hiuchigatake (Japanese: 燧ヶ岳) is a 2,356 m-tall (7,730 ft) stratovolcano in Oze National Park, and located in Hinoemata Village, Minami-Aizu gun, Fukushima Prefecture, Japan. This is the highest mountain in Tōhoku region. The volcano rises in the north of Lake Ozenuma. It is one of the 100 Famous Japanese Mountains.

== Morphology ==
Hiuchi initially formed around 350,000 years ago. Around 160,000–170,000 years ago, Hiuchi erupted, creating a large pyroclastic flow deposit. At the summit of the volcano lie two lava domes, Akanagure (赤ナグレ) and Mi-ike (御池岳). Akanagure, the southern dome, produced a series of viscous lava flows that flowed down the southern and western parts of the volcano about 3500 years ago. Mi-ike is responsible for the only recorded activity.

== Historic eruptions ==
=== 1544 eruptions ===
The only recorded activity was on July 28, 1544. A moderate phreatic eruption at the Mi-ike Lava Dome produced lahars and an associated tephra layer.

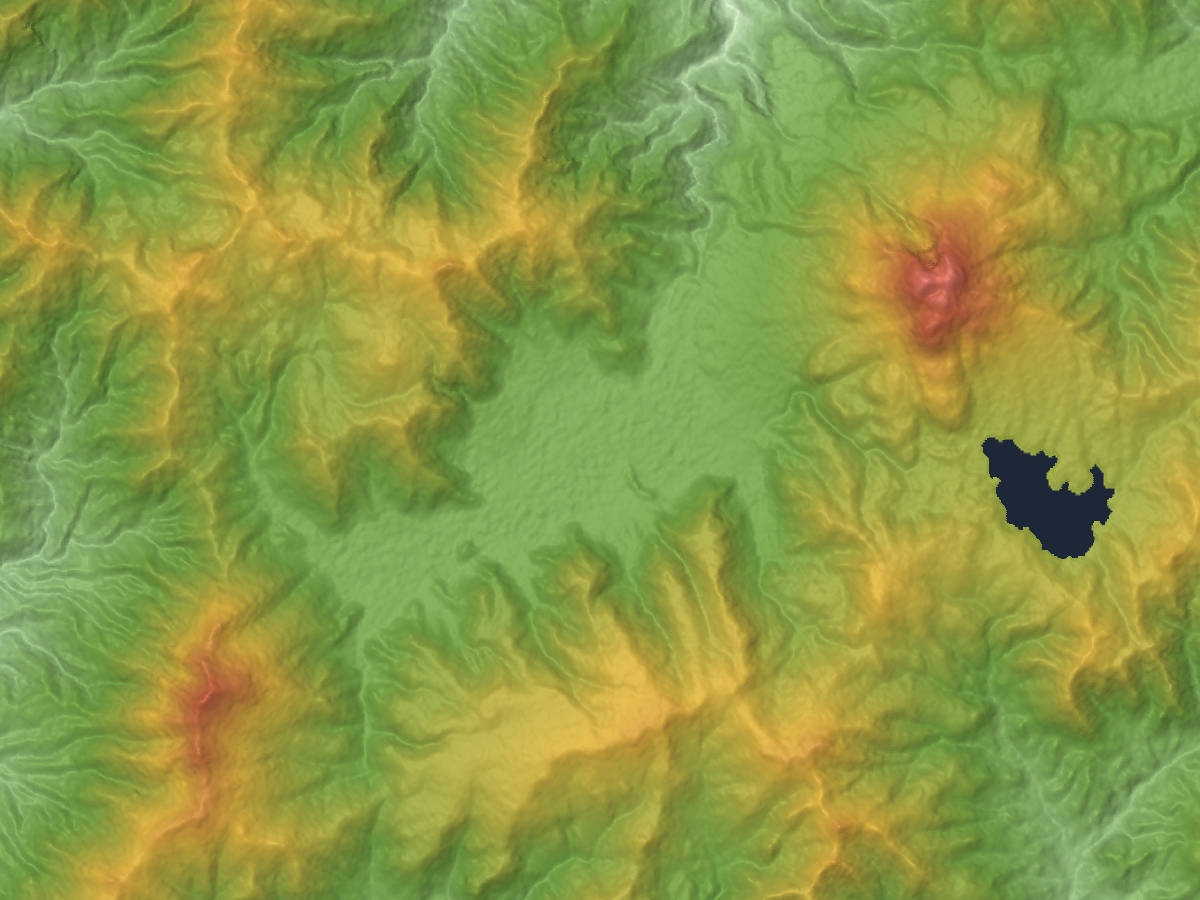
Around Ozegahara

== See also ==
- Asteroid 6883 Hiuchigatake, named after Hiuchigatake
- List of volcanoes in Japan
- List of mountains in Japan
