= Ozegahara =

Highland in Japan

Coordinates: 36°56′0″N 139°14′0″E

Designations

Ramsar Wetland
- Official name: Oze
- Designated: 8 November 2005
- Reference no.: 1554

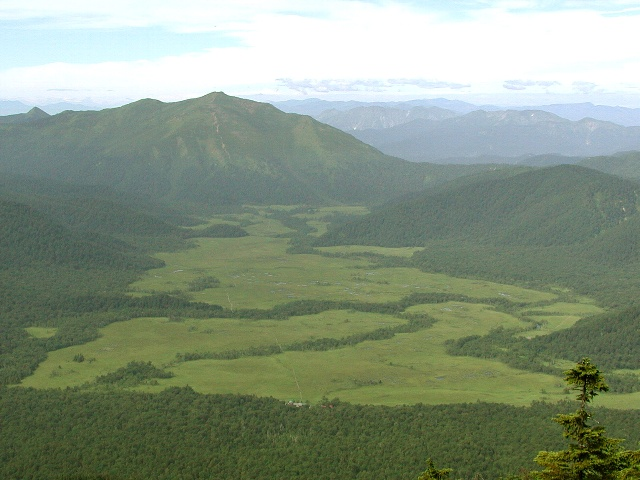
View of Ozegahara. Mount Shibutsu in the background. Taken from Mount Hiuchi

Ozegahara (尾瀬ヶ原) is a high altitude marshland in the Oze National Park, Japan.

Approximately 8 km^{2} in size, the marshland is well known for various species of plants, including the "mizu-bashō" (White Skunk Cabbage), "Nikkōkisuge" (yellow alpine lilies, Hemerocallis dumortieri var. esculenta) and "Watasuge" (Eriophorum vaginatum). The marshland is a popular hiking destination.

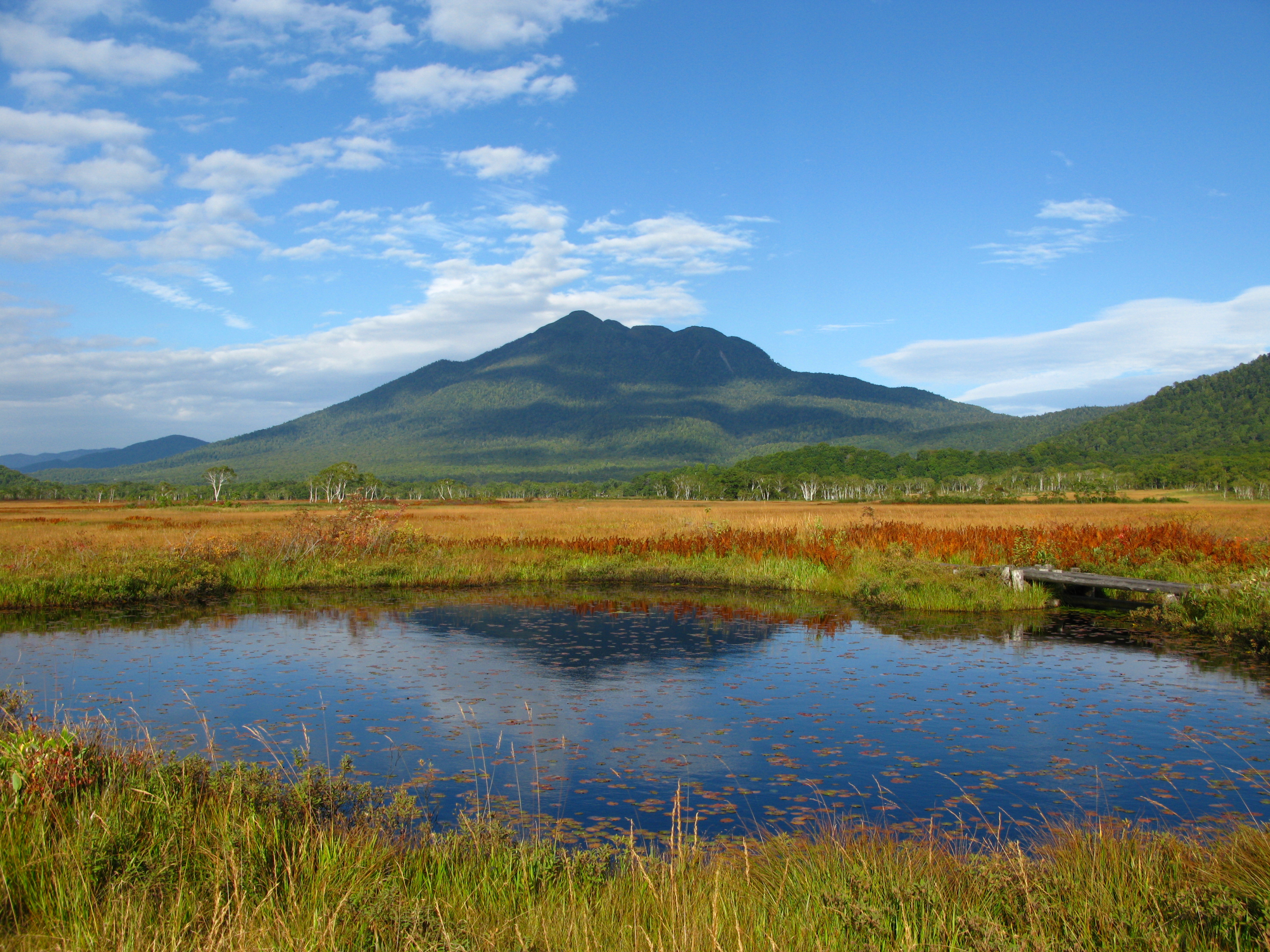
Ozegahara with Mount Hiuchi

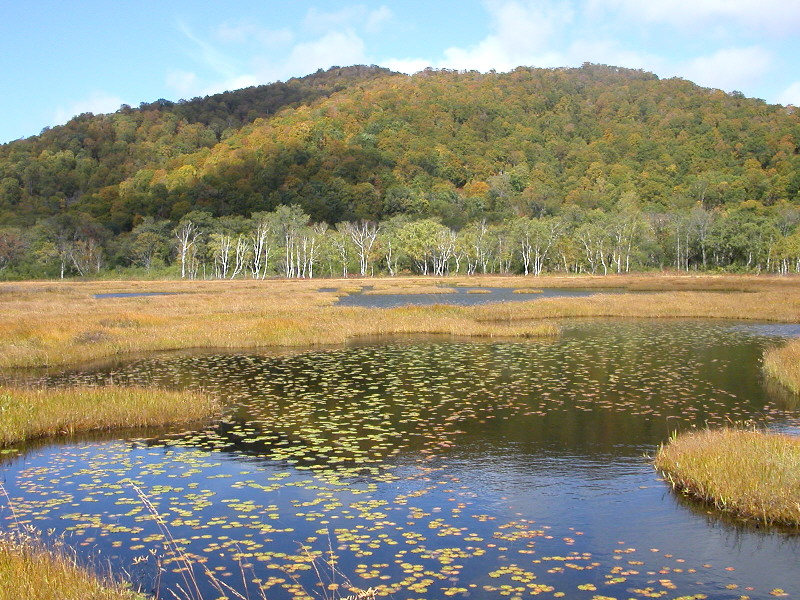
Marsh of Ozegahara

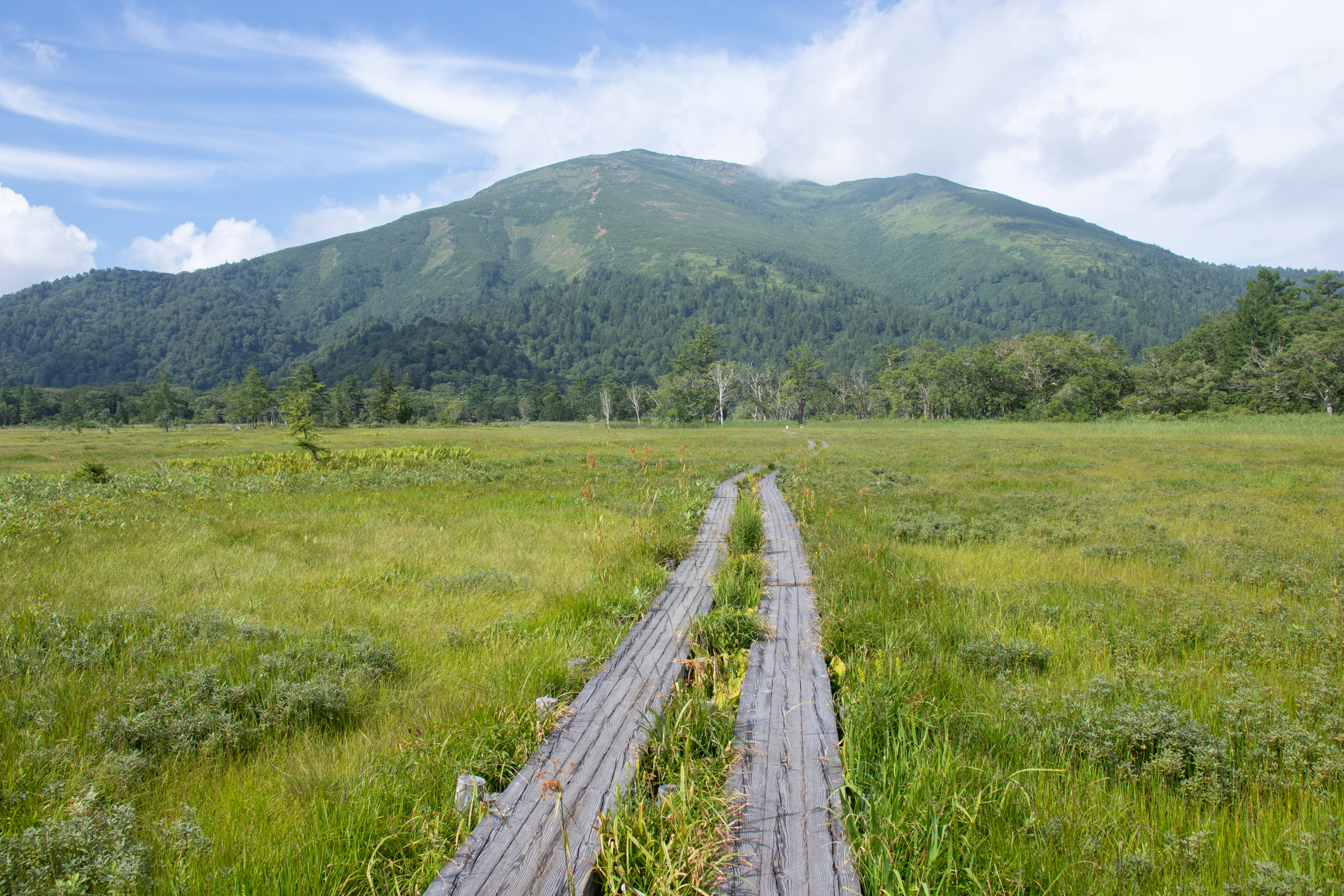
Boardwalk of Ozegahara. Mount Shibutsu in the background.
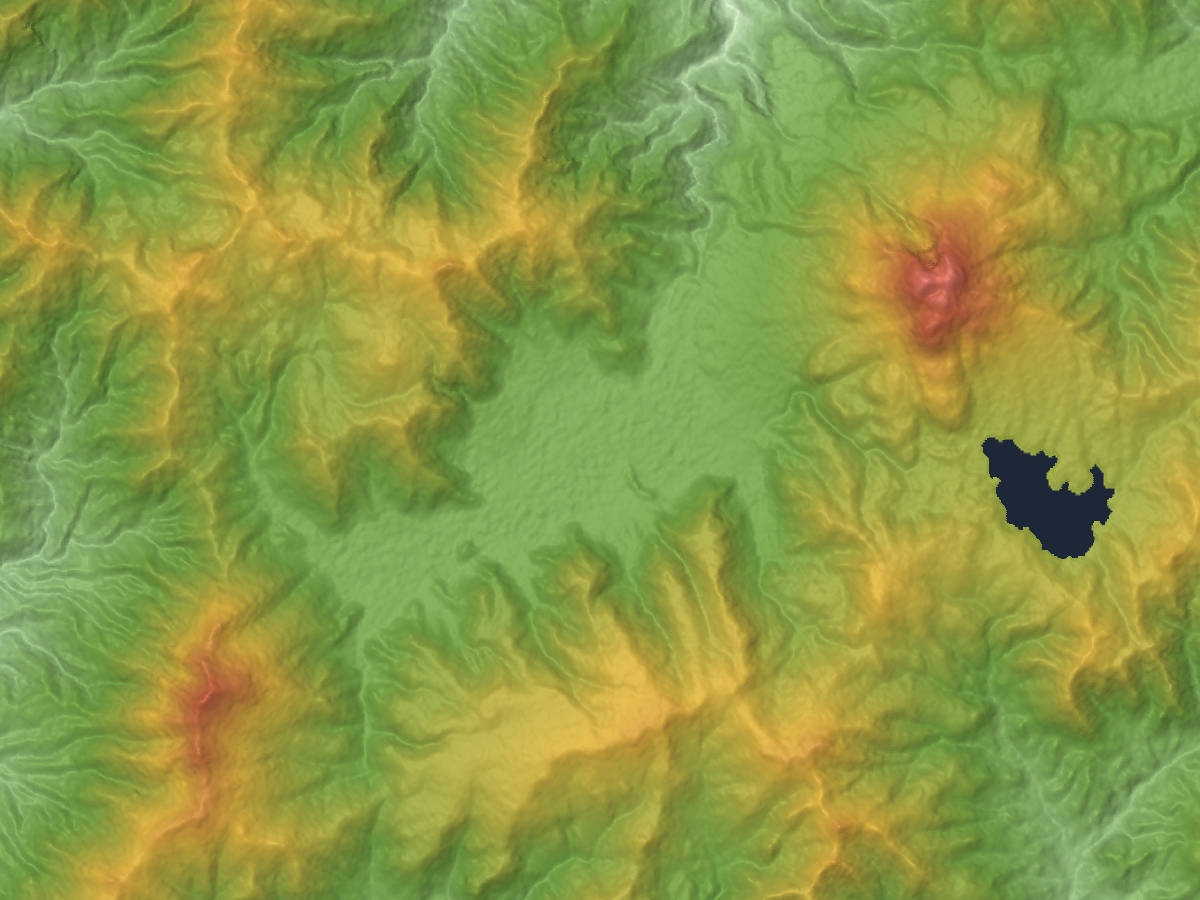
Around Ozegahara

== See also ==
- List of Special Places of Scenic Beauty, Special Historic Sites and Special Natural Monuments
