= Shangshan =

The Shangshan culture (Chinese: 上山遗址; pinyin: Shàngshān yízhǐ) is an early Holocene culture in the Lower Yangzi River valley in China, with more than 20 sites primarily distributed within Zhejiang Province. Shangshan site, the type site of Shangshan culture, is located at an elliptical basin of the Upper Puyang River . It has eight strata that span from the early Holocene to North Song dynasty (960–1127 CE) and the oldest horizons (Strata 5–8, 11,400–8600 cal. BP) belong to Shangshan culture. The site was found during the Neolithic sites survey along the Puyang River in 2000 and covers an area of over 2 ha. A total of 1,800 m^{2} has been excavated during three excavation seasons from 2001 to 2006. Shangshan is the earliest Holocene occupation in China in which residential dwellings, different kinds of pits, possible burials, pottery, stone tools, and consumption of plants in various ways occurred together.

== Material Culture ==
Archaeological materials include a lithic assemblage with evidence of the production of flaked, polished, and grinding stone tools, and a pottery assemblage with a unique set of vessels, including globular jars, cups, and bowls, crafted in plant-temper and charcoal-temper. The analysis of pottery vessel remains suggests multifunctional purposes: processing acorns, serving cooked foods, fermenting rice, and stone-boiling cooking. Faunal and plant assemblages indicate that the Shangshan inhabitants employed a broad-spectrum subsistence strategy, exploiting diverse plant resources, including rice, acorns, barnyard grass, various tubers, roots, and water chestnuts; hunting deer and boar; and fishing. The studies demonstrate the earliest evidence of rice utilization for rice-husk pottery tempering and for rice-based fermented beverages, including mold, yeast, and other starchy plants, detected in vessels excavated from ritual-related contexts such as possible burials and communal gathering locations.

Pits that serve different functions have been found at Shangshan. Some pits contain complete pottery vessels, showing a purposeful arrangement for possible future use. Some pits, with a square or round shape, were originally used for food storage before ultimately being abandoned . Meanwhile, other pits are deposits of secondary refuse that demonstrate an intentional management of domestic waste. These pits suggest a mixed pattern of occupation at Shangshan, and together with remains of arranged postholes, imply a tendency towards a long duration of residence.

== Sources ==
1.L. Jiang, L. Liu, New evidence for the origins of sedentism and rice domestication in the Lower Yangzi River, China. Antiquity 80, 355–361 (2006).

2.L. Liu, X. Chen, The Archaeology of China: From the Late Paleolithic to the Early Bronze Age (Cambridge University Press, 2012).

3. L. Liu et al., Identification of 10,000-year-old rice beer at Shangshan in the Lower Yangzi River valley of China. Proc. Natl. Acad. Sci. U.S.A. 121, e2412274121 (2024).

4.Zhejiang wenwu kaogu yanjiusuo, Pujiang Museum, Zhejiang Pujiangxian Shangshan yizhi fajue jianbao 浙江浦江县上山遗址发掘简报. Kaogu 9, 7–18 (2007).

5.Zhejiang wenwu kaogu yanjiusuo, Pujiang Museum, Pujiang Shangshan 浦阳江流域考古报告之三：浦江上山 (Wenwu chubanshe 文物出版社, 2016).

Shangshan or shang-shan may also refer to:

== Places ==
- Shangshan Village, Dacheng Township, Changhua County, Taiwan
- Shangshan Village, Qionglin Township, Hsinchu County, Taiwan
- Shangshan Village, Yuduan Township, Xiangxiang City (county), Xiangtan City (prefecture), Hunan Province, China
- Shangshan Township (上衫乡), Xiushui County, Jiujiang Prefecture, Jiangxi Province, China
- Shangshan Town (商山镇), Xiuning County, Huangshan City, Anhui Province, China
- Shangshan Site (Chinese: 上山遗址; pinyin: Shangshan Yizhi), Pujiang County, Zhejiang, China; an archaeological site

== People ==
- Yang Shangshan (楊上善; 7th century CE) author of the Yellow Emperor's Inner Canon 太素 Taisu

=== Mythological ===
- Shǎngshàn Leigong (Thundergod Shangshan); an East Asian thunder god

== Other uses ==
- Shangshan Subdialect (simplified Chinese: 上山声; traditional Chinese: 上山聲; pinyin: Shàngshān shēng), a subdialect of Wuhua dialect

== See also ==
- Shang (disambiguation)
- Shan (disambiguation)
- Shanshan (disambiguation)
- Shanshang District (Chinese: 山上區; pinyin: Shānshàng Qū; Pe̍h-ōe-jī: San-siōng-khu), Tainan, Taiwan
- Shanshang dialect (Chinese: 山上音; pinyin: Shānshàng Yīn)
- Shang Shang Typhoon (上々颱風, Shan shan taifūn), Japanese band
