= Shanshan (disambiguation) =

Shanshan, shan-shan, or variation, may refer to:

== Places ==
- Shanshan, ancient kingdom in located in Xinjiang
- Shanshan County, county in Xinjiang, Pichan County in Uyghur
- Shanshan, Loudi (杉山镇), a town of Louxing District, Loudi, Hunan

== People ==
- He Shanshan (born 1999), Chinese Paralympic athlete
- Huang Shanshan, Chinese gymnast
- Huang Shan-shan, Taiwanese politician
- Li Shanshan, Chinese basketball player
- Li Shanshan, Chinese discus thrower
- Li Shanshan, Chinese gymnast
- Liu Shanshan, Chinese footballer
- Shanshan Feng, Chinese golfer
- Wang Shanshan, Chinese footballer
- Yuan Shanshan, Chinese actress
- Zhong Shanshan, Chinese businessman

== Other uses ==
- Susanna (1967 film), Hong Kong film

== See also ==
- Typhoon Shanshan (disambiguation)
- Shan (disambiguation)
- Shanshang District (Chinese: 山上區; pinyin: Shānshàng Qū; Pe̍h-ōe-jī: San-siōng-khu), Tainan, Taiwan
- Shanshang Subdialect (Chinese: 山上音; pinyin: Shānshàng Yīn), see Danzhou dialect
- Shang Shang Typhoon (上々颱風, Shan shan taifūn), Japanese band
- Shangshan (disambiguation)
