= Mount Aizu-Komagatake =

Mountain in Fukushima Prefecture, Japan

- 会津駒ヶ岳
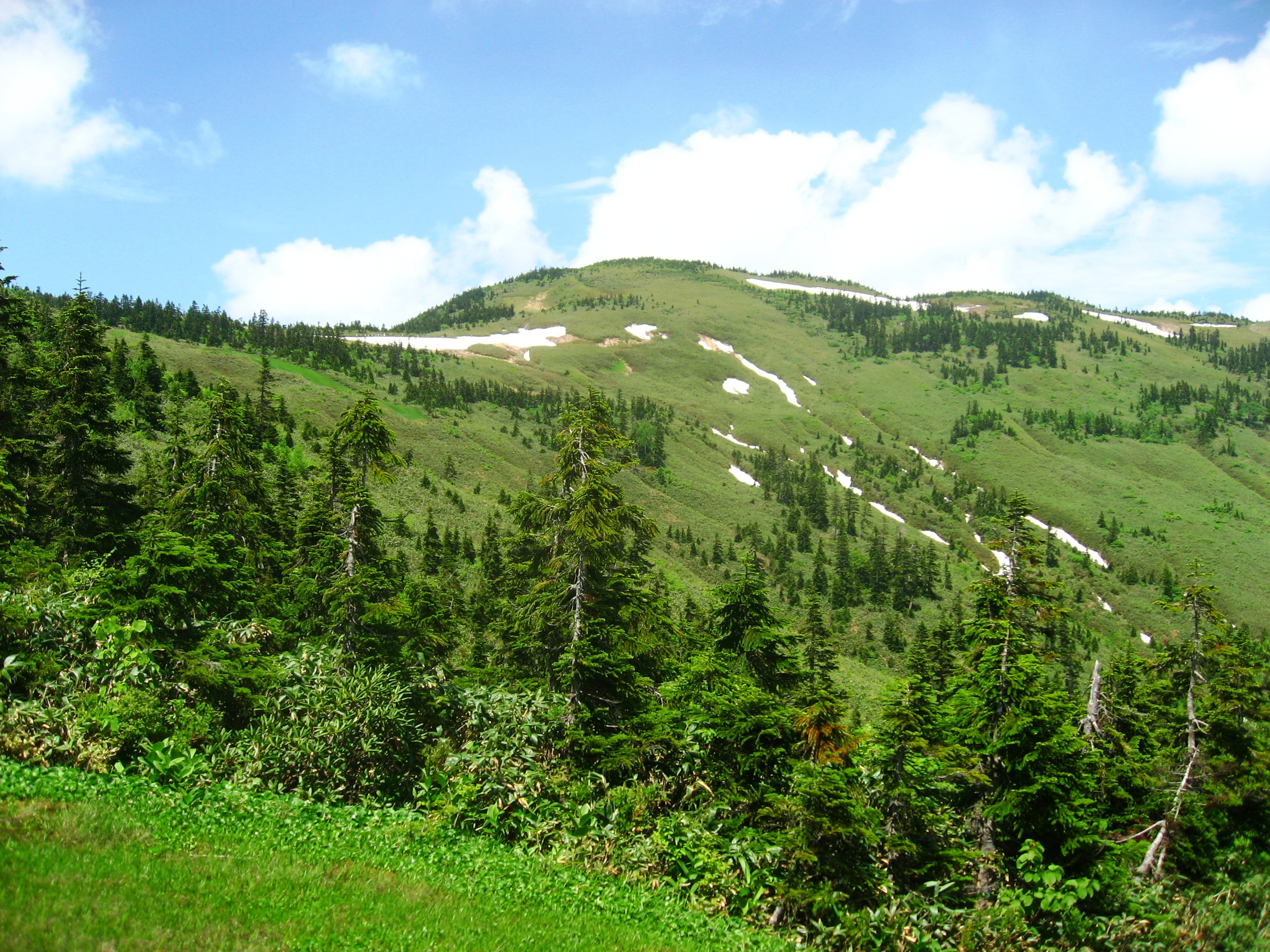

Highest point
- Elevation: 2,133 m (6,998 ft)
- Listing: 100 Famous Japanese Mountains
- Coordinates: 37°02′51.4″N 139°21′13.6″E

Geography
- Location within Fukushima Prefecture Location within Japan
- Country: Japan
- Prefecture: Fukushima
- Protected area: Oze National Park
- Village: Hinoemata
- Parent range: Echigo Mountains

Mount Aizu-Komagatake (会津駒ヶ岳, Aizu-Komagatake) is a mountain located in Hinoemata, Fukushima Prefecture, Japan, in the Oze National Park. It is one of the 100 Famous Japanese Mountains.

Height: 2,133 meters (6,998 ft).

Location: Fukushima Prefecture, near the border with Niigata Prefecture.

Mountain Range: Echigo Mountains.

Notable features: Wetlands, mountain views, and wild alpine flowers.

Access to Mount Aizu-Komagatake is typically initiated from Hinoemata Village, a secluded mountain settlement in Fukushima Prefecture, renowned for its preservation of traditional Japanese culture. The village serves as the primary trailhead for those undertaking the ascent.

The most accessible railway connection is via Aizu-Kawaguchi Station, from which travelers can proceed to the trailhead by means of a local bus service. This combination of rail and bus transport makes the mountain reasonably accessible despite its remote location.

The standard hiking route to the summit and back generally requires approximately 6 to 8 hours, with total duration influenced by factors such as individual fitness level, trail conditions, and prevailing weather.

== See also ==
Media related to Mount Aizukoma at Wikimedia Commons
