= Mount Shibutsu =

Mountain in Japan

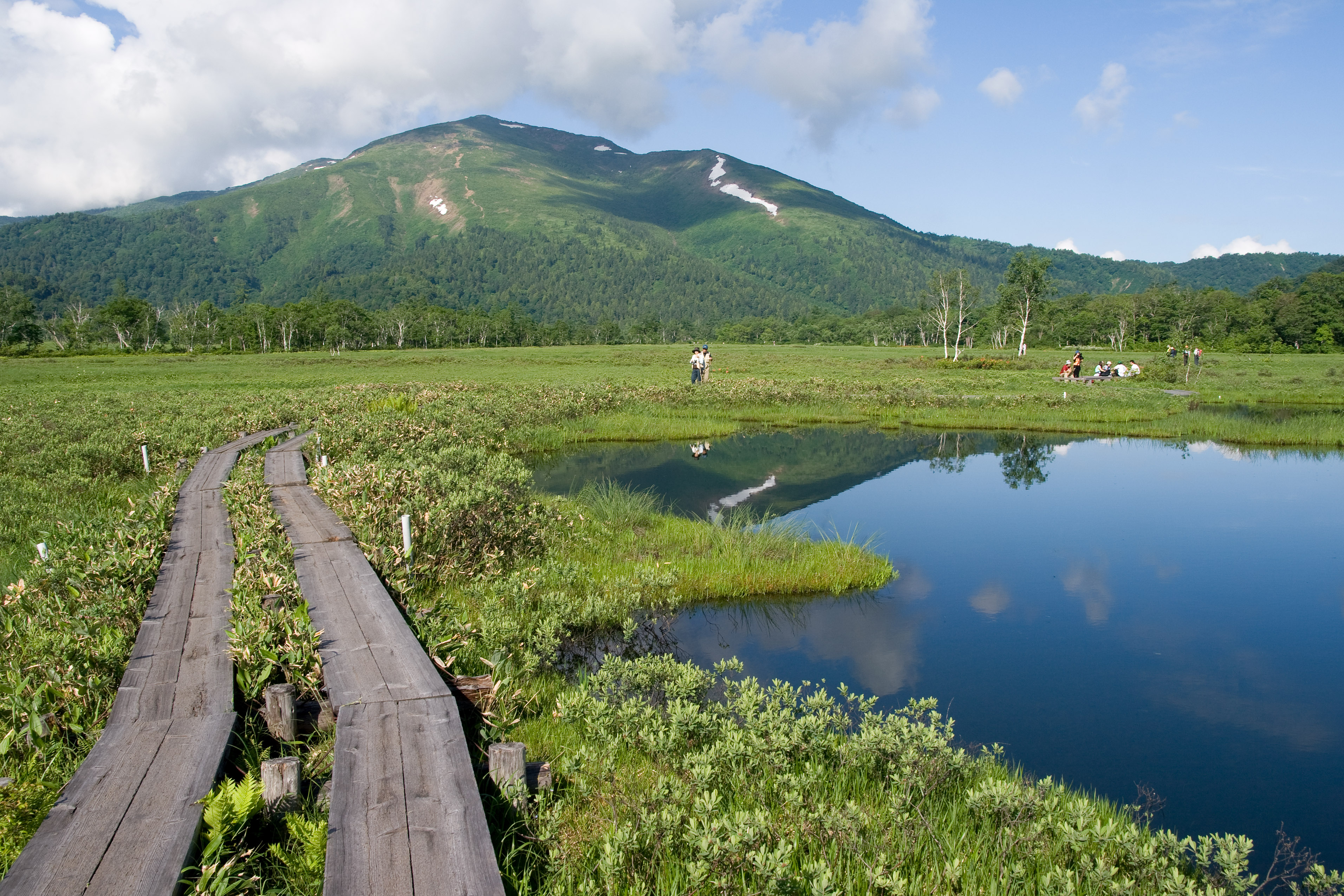

Highest point
- Coordinates: 36°54′12″N 139°10′24″E

Geography
- Location: Gunma Prefecture, Japan

Mount Shibutsu (至仏山 Shifutsu/Shibutsu-san) is a serpentine mountain in the north-east of Gunma Prefecture in Japan. It is 2,228.1 m (7,310 ft) tall and located between Minakami Machi and Katashina Villages. It's one of the 100 Famous Japanese Mountains and is home to a "treasure trove" of alpine plants. It is part of Oze National Park and the Minakami UNESCO Eco Park.

== Mountain climbing ==
The mountain can be climbed from April through November, and summiting takes about three hours.

Hence, Mt. Shibutsu is a part of Oze National Park, access to the area is prohibited to protect vegetation during the remaining snow season by the Oze Reservation Foundation. Normally, no entry period is from May to June. Check up the Oze Reservation Foundation web site for more details.

== Flora ==
The mountain is home to several rare plant species that thrive in the serpentine soils, including Arenaria katoana, Leontopodium fauriei, and Japonolirion osense.
