= Japan National Route 401 =

Road in Japan

National Route 401
- 国道401号
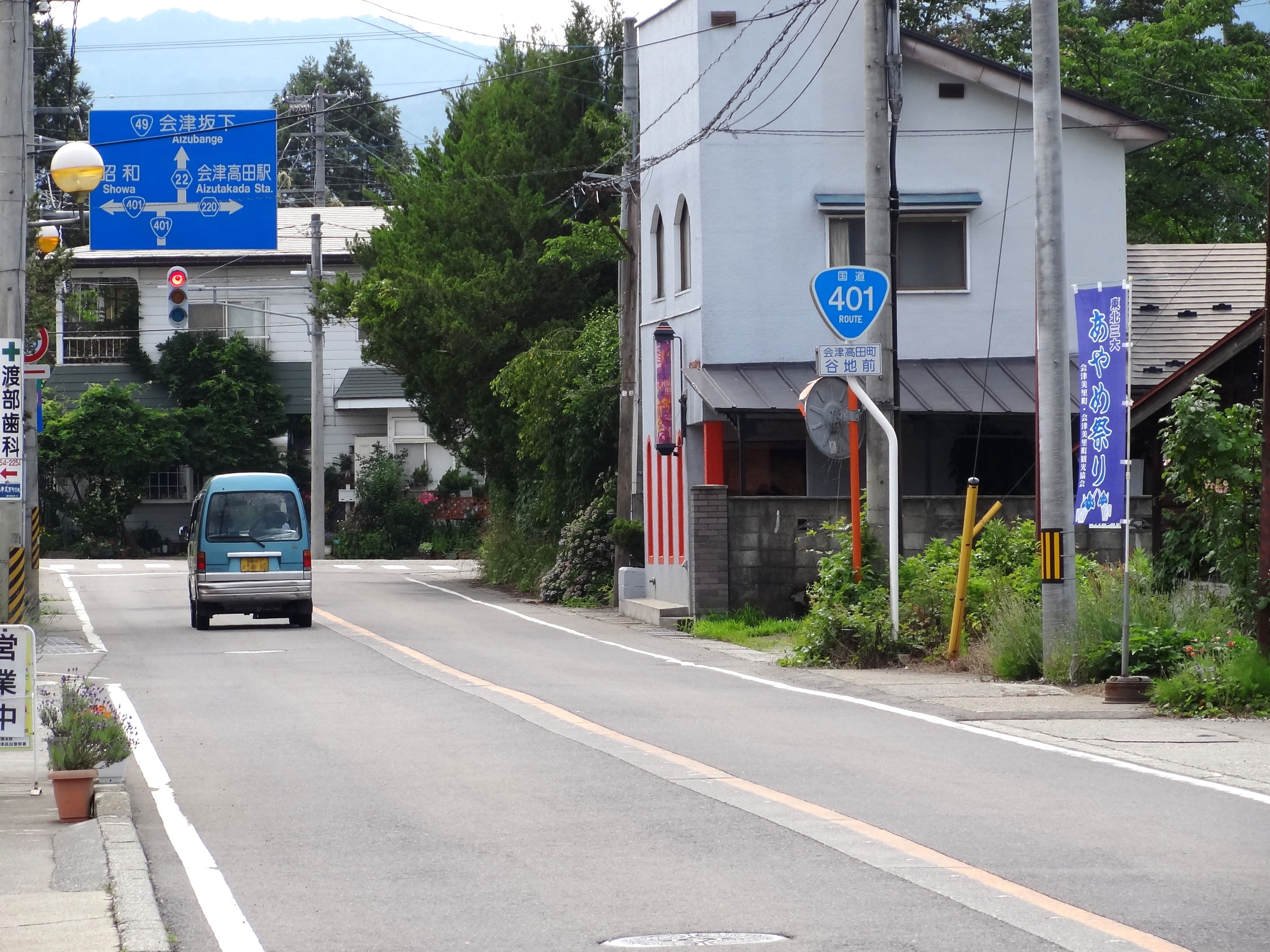

Route information
- Length: 171.1 km (106.3 mi)
- Existed: 1982–present

Location
- Country: Japan

Highway system
- National highways of Japan; Expressways of Japan
← National Route 400	→ National Route 402

National Route 401 is a national highway of Japan comprising two separated segments between Aizuwakamatsu, Fukushima and Numata, Gunma in Japan, with a total length of 171.1 km (106.32 mi).

== Route description ==
A section of National Route 401 in the village of Katashina in Gunma Prefecture is a musical road.
