= Sanjō =

In Japanese, Sanjō (三条; lit. third street) may refer to:

== People ==
- Emperor Sanjō (三条天皇; Sanjō-tennō), the 67th emperor of Japan
- Sanjō family (三条家, Sanjōke), a Japanese kuge family
- Emperor Go-Sanjō (後三条天皇; 1034–1073), was the 71st emperor of Japan
- Lady Sanjō (三条の方; 1521–1570), Japanese noblewoman
- Mariko Sanjo (三条 万里子; born 1933), Japanese modern dancer, choreographer and director
- Riku Sanjo (三条 陸; born 1964), Japanese manga writer and screenwriter
- Sanetomi Sanjō (三条 実美; 1837–1891), Japanese Imperial court noble and statesman

== Fictional characters ==
- Kairi Sanjō and Yukari Sanjō, fictional characters from the manga series Shugo Chara!
- Reika Sanjō, fictional characters from the anime series Invincible Steel Man Daitarn 3
- Yukito Sanjō, fictional character from the Bakuryu Sentai Abaranger

== Places ==
- Sanjō Falls (三条の滝, Sanjō-no-taki), a waterfall in Hinoemata, Fukushima Prefecture, Japan
- Sanjō Keihan Station (三条京阪駅 Sanjō Keihan Eki), a subway station in Higashiyama ward
- Sanjō, Niigata (三条市; Sanjō-shi), a city in Niigata Prefecture, Japan
- Sanjō Ōhashi (三条大橋), a bridge in Kyoto, Kyoto Prefecture, Japan
- Sanjō Street, Kyoto (三条通, Sanjō-dori), one of numbered east–west streets in the ancient capital of Heian-kyō, present-day Kyoto
- Sanjō Street (Nara) (三条通り, Sanjō-dori), one of numbered east–west streets in the ancient capital of Heijō-kyō, present-day Nara
- Sanjō Station (disambiguation), train stations "山上" and "三条"

== Others ==
- Sanjo (music), a style of traditional Korean music
- Sanjō Wasan, a collection of three Japanese hymns

== See also ==
- Sanyo
