= Sanjō Falls =

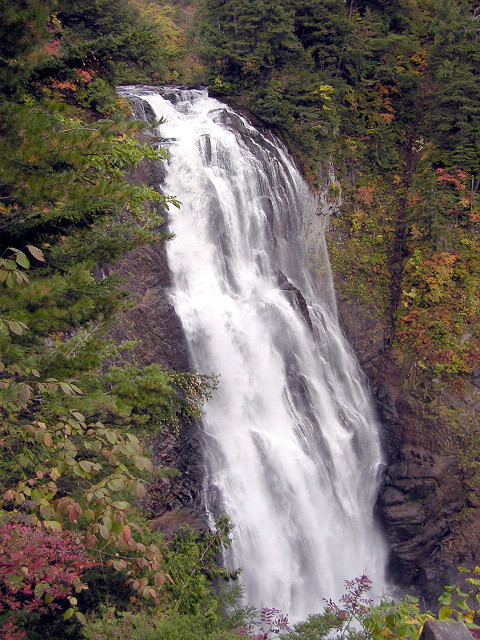

- Location within Japan
- Location: Hinoemata, Fukushima Prefecture and Uonuma, Niigata Prefecture, Japan
- Coordinates: 36°57′56″N 139°15′1″E
- Total height: 100 m (330 ft)
- Number of drops: 1
- Average width: 20–30 m (66–98 ft)
- Watercourse: Tadami River

Sanjō Falls (三条の滝, Sanjō-no-taki) is a waterfall in Hinoemata, Fukushima Prefecture, Japan, on the Tadami River in Oze National Park. It is one of "Japan’s Top 100 Waterfalls", in a listing published by the Japanese Ministry of the Environment in 1990.
