= Sanjō Station =

Sanjo Station may refer to the following railway stations in Japan:

- Sanjō Station (Niigata) (三条駅) - JR East Shin'etsu Line in Sanjo, Niigata Prefecture
- Sanjō Station (Kyoto) (三条駅) - Keihan Railway in Higashiyama-ku, Kyoto, Kyoto Prefecture
  - Sanjō-Keihan Station (三条京阪駅) - Kyoto Subway Tozai Line in Higashiyama-ku, Kyoto, Kyoto Prefecture
- Nishioji-Sanjo Station (西大路三条駅) - Keifuku Railroad Arashiyama Line in Ukyo-ku, Kyoto, Kyoto Prefecture
- Sanjō Station (Kagawa) (三条駅) - Takamatsu Kotohira Railroad Kotohira Line in Takamatsu, Kagawa Prefecture
- Sanjō Station (Tokyo) (山上駅) - Takao Mountain Railroad
- Sanjō Station (Fukuoka) (山上駅) - Sarakurayama Cable Car in Yahatahigashi-ku, Kitakyushu, FUkuoka Prefecture

== See also ==
- Sanjō (disambiguation)
