= Shang Shang Typhoon =

Japanese band

Shang Shang Typhoon (上々颱風, Shan shan taifū) is a Japanese band of the 1980s and 1990s. Led by Kōryū, the band also features female singers Satoko Nishikawa and Emi Shirasaki. The SST sound is a blend of Okinawan music, min'yo singing and other Japanese elements, with some rock, pop and reggae thrown in. The unique sound of the group is largely due to an original instrument devised by Kōryū that he calls "sangen"; a banjo strung with shamisen strings.

In 1990 Shang Shang Typhoon signed with the Epic/Sony label, but more recently they have recorded on independent labels. In 1994, they composed the soundtrack to Studio Ghibli film Pom Poko.

On 1 February 2013 at the official Shang Shang Typhoon website, the band announced an indefinite hiatus due to the health of band leader Kōryū.

== Members ==
Shang Shang Typhoon Members
Kōryū	紅龍	"Sangen", Vocals	Band Leader
Emi Shirasaki "Emi-chan"	白崎映美 (えみちゃん)	Vocals	
Satoko Nishikawa "Sato-chan"	西川郷子 (さとちゃん)	Vocals	
Manto Watanobe	渡野辺マント	Drums	
Yōko Ino	猪野陽子	Keyboards, Accordion	
Naoki Nishimura	西村直樹	Bass	
Former Members
Naoya Yasuda "Yas-san"	安田尚哉 (やっさん)	Bass	
Masaru Gotō	後藤まさる	Percussion, Shinobue	
Yoshimi Yoshida	吉田よしみ	Keyboards	temporary replacement for Yōko Ino

== Discography ==
Year	Title	Japanese	Label	Notes
1990	Shang Shang Typhoon	上々颱風	Epic Sony	
1991	Shang Shang Typhoon 2	上々颱風2	Epic Sony	
1992	Shang Shang Typhoon 3	上々颱風3	Epic Sony	
1993	Ai Ga Aru Kara Daijōbu	愛があるから大丈夫	Epic Sony	
1994	Around Asia in 80 Days	八十日間亜州一周	Epic Sony	
1996	Tamegoma (Tā Me Ga Math)	た・め・ご・ま	Epic Sony	
1997	Gnahs Gnahs	GNAHS GNAHS	Epic Sony	
2000	Shang Shang Typhoon 8	上々颱風8	Yougey Inc.	
2001	Shang Shang Typhoon Paradise Live!	上々颱風パラダイスライブ！	Pony Canyon Japan	
2001	Shang Shang Typhoon 9 – Kokoro No Hana	上々颱風9 ～心の花～	Pony Canyon Japan	
2004	Shang Shang Typhoon Jirokichi Days 1988	上々颱風JIROKICHI DAYS 1988	Pony Canyon Japan	
2005	Shang Shang A Go Go!	Shang Shang A Go Go!	Pony Canyon Japan	
2005	Shang Shang Typhoon Best Collection I	上々颱風名曲撰 I	Pony Canyon Japan	
2006	Shang Shang Typhoon 11 – Attarimae da.	上々颱風11 あったりまえだ。	Pony Canyon Japan	
2009	Shang Shang Typhoon 12 – Domin No Uta	上々颱風12 ～土民の歌～	Pony Canyon Japan	
2010	Ohitorisama-Bunka	おひとりさま挽歌	M&I Company	single
2010	Kaze no Matsuri – Carnaval	風の祭り~CARNAVAL~	Boundee	

Video

- Begara Shagara Live Akogare (1992); Epic Sony
- Shang Shang Buri (2004); M and I Inc. (Pony Canyon Japan)
