= Yamagami (disambiguation) =

Yamagami (Japanese: やまがみ, romanized: yama-kami, 山上, 山神, 山の神), also written as Yamakami, may refer to:

== People ==
- Mikihito Yamagami (山上幹臣, born 1987) Japanese mixed martial artist
- Tetsuya Yamagami (山上徹也, born 1980), perpetrator of the assassination of former prime minister Shinzo Abe.

=== Mythological ===
- Yamagami (Japanese: 山の神, romanized: yama-no-kami, lit. 'mountain spirit') Japanese Shinto mountain spirits

=== Fictional characters ===
- Yamagami Beast, a character from the Japanese TV show Space Sheriff Sharivan
- Captain Yamagami, a character from the 2005 Japanese film Deep Sea Monster Reigo
- Akio Yamagami (山神 燦緒), a character from the Japanese anime cartoon Sister Princess
- Itsuki Yamagami (山神 異月), a character from the Japanese manga comic and anime Corpse Princess
- Mamimi Yamagami (山神 眞深美), a character from the Japanese anime cartoon Sister Princess
- Shuji Yamagami, a character from the Japanese video game Season of the Sakura

== Places ==
- Yamagami (山上), Shiga, Japan; a village merged into Kanzaki District, Shiga
- Yamakami Domain (山上藩, Yamakami-han), a Fudai feudal domain under the Tokugawa shogunate of Edo period Japan

=== Facilities and structures ===
- Yamakami Castle Site (Japanese: 山上城跡, romanized: Yamakami-jō ato), Kiryū, Gunma, Japan; see List of Historic Sites of Japan (Gunma)
- Yamagami Station (Japanese: 山上駅, romanized: Yamagami-eki), a former rail station superseded by Keihan-otsukyo Station
- Yamagami Dam (山神ダム), a gravity concrete & fill dam (compound) dam located in Fukuoka Prefecture in Japan
