= Oze National Park =

National Park in Chūbū, Japan

- 尾瀬国立公園
- IUCN category V (protected landscape/seascape)
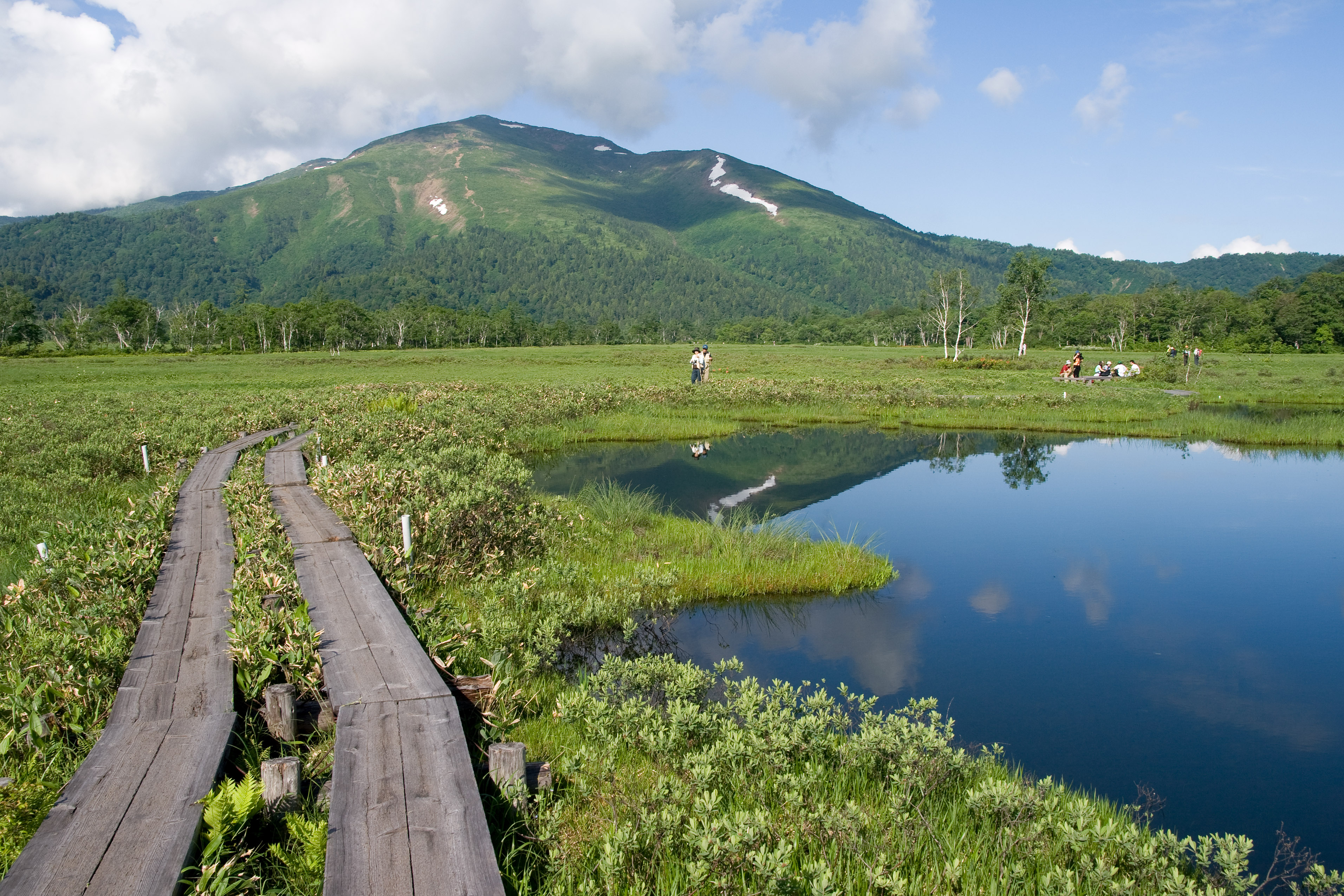
- Mount Shibutsu and Ozegahara

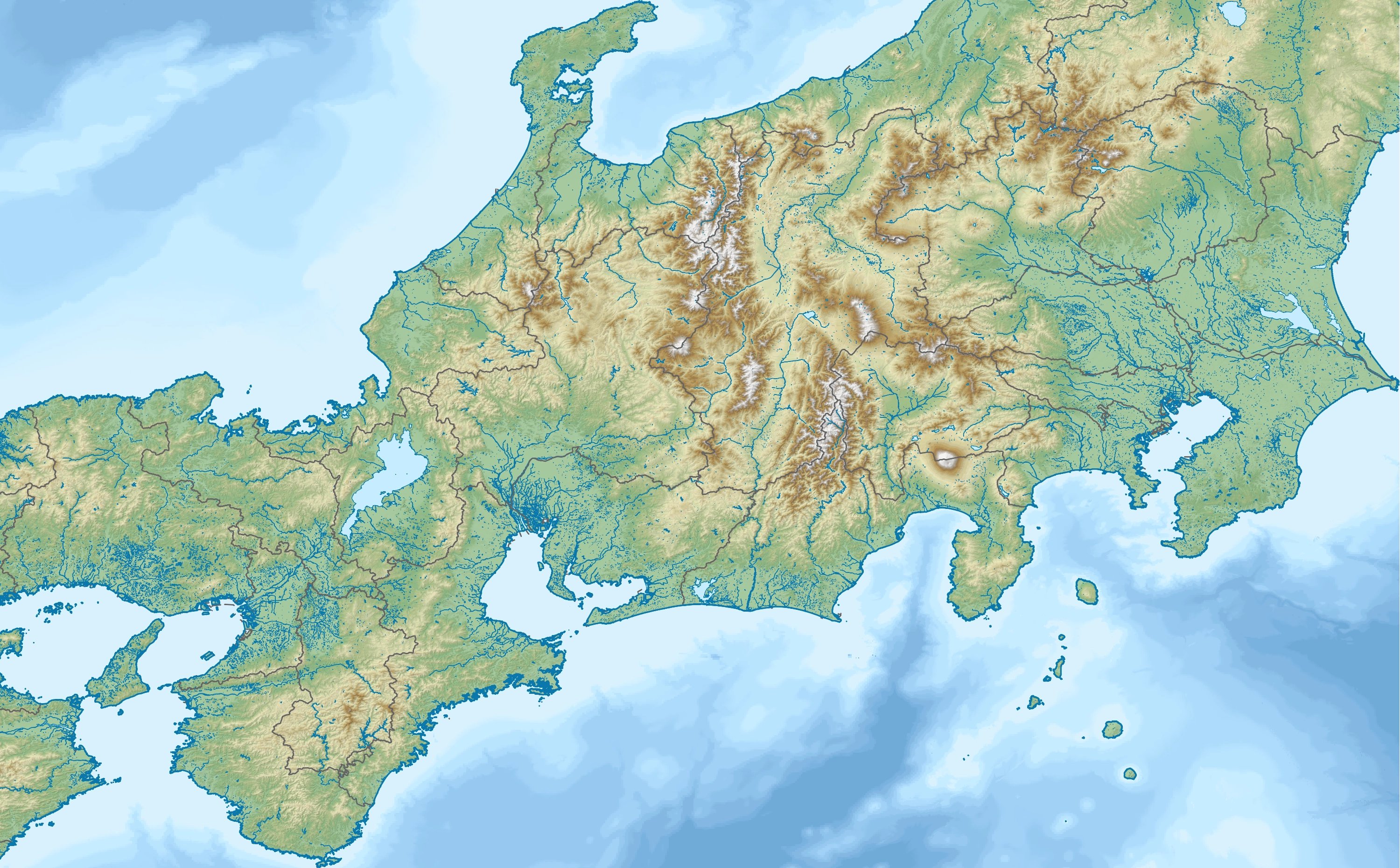
- Location within Central Japan Location within Japan
- Location: Kantō region, Japan
- Coordinates: 36°55′38″N 139°18′58″E
- Area: 372.22 km^{2} (143.71 sq mi)
- Established: August 30, 2007
- Governing body: Ministry of the Environment (Japan)

Ramsar Wetland
- Official name: Oze
- Designated: 8 November 2005
- Reference no.: 1554

Oze National Park (尾瀬国立公園, Oze Kokuritsu Kōen), is an area consisting of open greenland in Fukushima, Tochigi, Gunma and Niigata Prefectures in Japan. The park is 372 km^{2} in area and is the 29th national park in Japan.

Opened on 30 August 2007, the park's area includes the marshes (Ozegahara) and the mountains in the Oze area, formerly part of the Nikkō National Park, and other nearby areas including the Aizu-Komagatake and Tashiroyama mountains.

The park was the first new national park to open in 20 years, since the designation of Hokkaidō's Kushiro wetlands as a national park in 1987.

In Gunma's Jomo Karuta, Oze National Park is featured on the 'se' card.

In September 2025, Lucy Oze Hatomachi, a mountain lodge operated by Hoshino Resorts, opened at Hatomachi Pass, a principal access point to Oze National Park. Its establishment was realized as part of a tourism policy announced in 2024 by the Kishida administration, which aimed to attract luxury resort hotels to all 35 national parks in Japan.

== See also ==
- List of national parks of Japan
- Mount Aizu-Komagatake
- Sanjō Falls
- Mount Hiuchigatake
