= Gokan Station =

Railway station in Minakami, Gunma Prefecture, Japan

Gokan Station 後閑駅
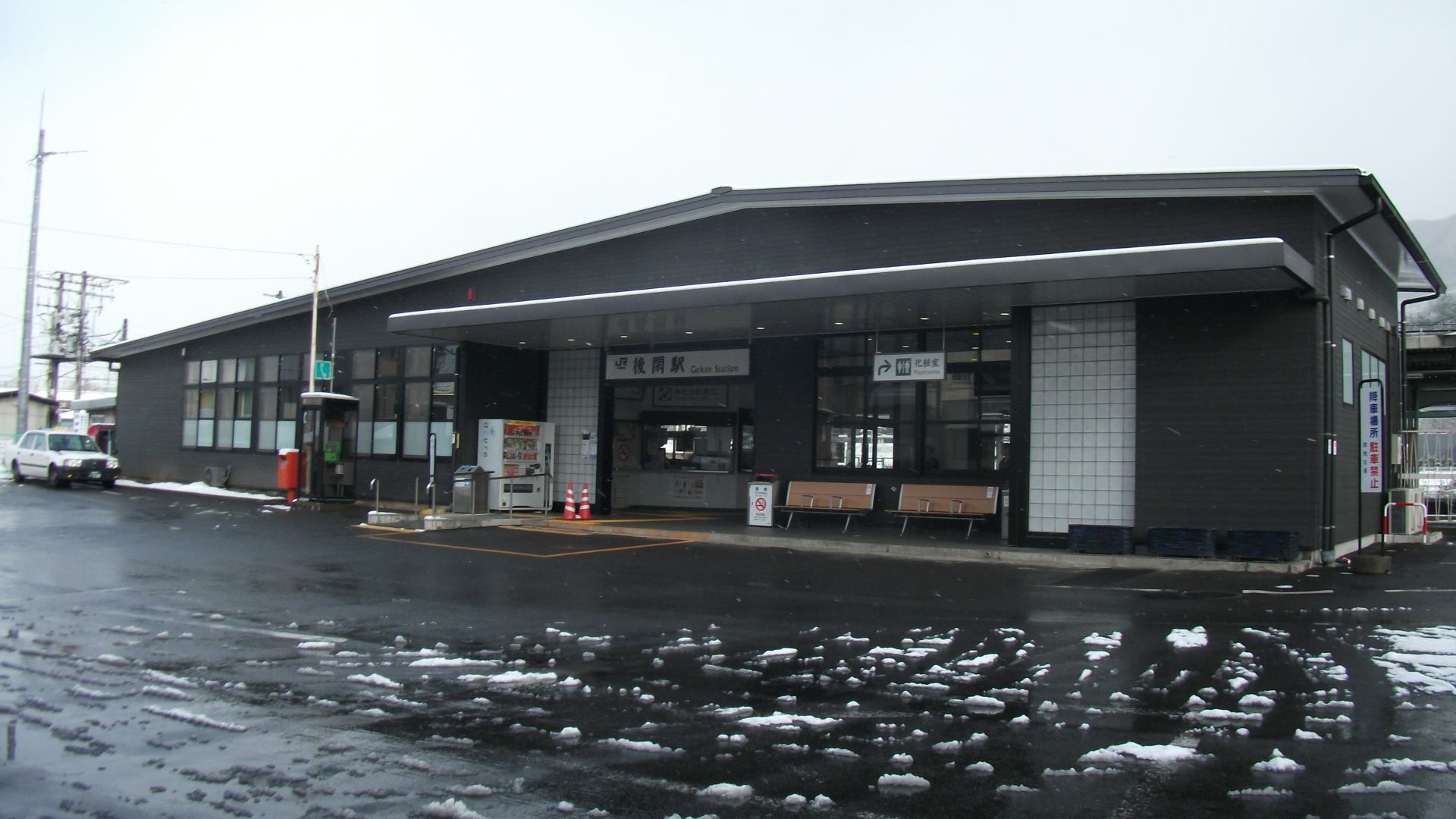
- Gokan Station, December 2011

General information
- Location: Gokan 1237, Minakami-machi, Tone-gun, Gunma-ken 379-1305; Japan
- Coordinates: 36.6797°N 139.0003°E
- Operator: JR East
- Line: ■ Jōetsu Line
- Distance: 46.6 km from Takasaki
- Platforms: 1 side + 1 island platforms

Other information
- Status: Unstaffed
- Website: Official website

History
- Opened: 20 November 1926; 99 years ago

Passengers
- FY2017: 785 daily

Services
Preceding station	JR East	Following station
Numata towards Takasaki	Jōetsu Line	Kamimoku towards Nagaoka
Location
- Location within Gunma Prefecture Location within Japan

Gokan Station (後閑駅, Gokan-eki) is a passenger railway station in the town of Minakami, Gunma, Japan, operated by the East Japan Railway Company (JR East).

== Lines ==
Gokan Station is a station on the Jōetsu Line, and is located 46.6 kilometers from the starting point of the line at Takasaki.

== Station layout ==
The station consists of a single side platform and a single island platform connected to the station building by a footbridge; however, one side of the island platform is not in use. The station has a Midori no Madoguchi ticket office.

=== Platforms ===
1	■ Jōetsu Line	for Minakami, Echigo-Yuzawa, and Nagaoka
3	■ Jōetsu Line	for Numata, Shibukawa, Shin-Maebashi, Takasaki and Ueno

== History ==
Gokan Station opened on 20 November 1926. Upon the privatization of the Japanese National Railways (JNR) on 1 April 1987, it came under the control of JR East. As of 20 April 2018, Gokan Station became an unattended station.

== Passenger statistics ==
In fiscal 2017, the station was used by an average of 785 passengers daily (boarding passengers only).

== Surrounding area ==
- Minakami Town Hall
- Tsukiyono Post Office

== See also ==
- List of railway stations in Japan
