= Numata Station =

Railway station in Numata, Gunma Prefecture, Japan

Numata Station 沼田駅
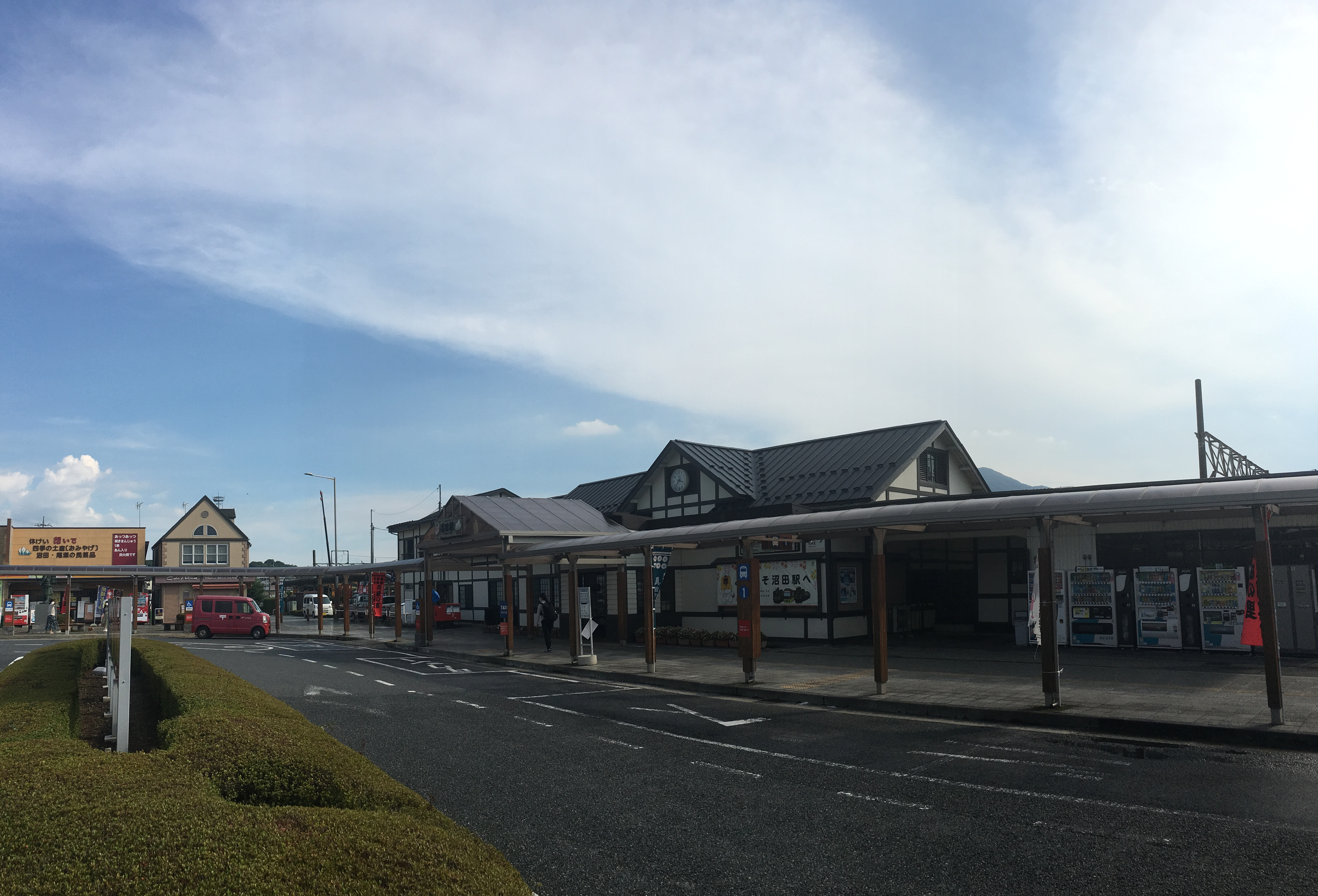
- The station entrance and forecourt, August 2021

General information
- Location: 3155 Shimizu-chō, Numata-shi, Gunma-ken 378-0016; Japan
- Coordinates: 36.6426°N 139.0360°E
- Operator: JR East
- Line: ■ Jōetsu Line
- Distance: 41.4 km from Takasaki
- Platforms: 1 side + 1 island platform

Other information
- Status: Staffed (Midori no Madoguchi )
- Website: Official website

History
- Opened: 31 March 1924; 102 years ago

Passengers
- FY2019: 1622

Services
Preceding station	JR East	Following station
Iwamoto towards Takasaki	Jōetsu Line	Gokan towards Nagaoka
Location
- Location within Gunma Prefecture Location within Japan

Numata Station (沼田駅, Numata-eki) is a passenger railway station in the city of Numata, Gunma, Japan, operated by the East Japan Railway Company (JR East).

== Lines ==
Numata Station is a station on the Jōetsu Line, and is located 41.4 kilometers from the starting point of the line at Takasaki.

== Station layout ==
The station has a single side platform and a single island platform, serving three tracks. The island platform (platforms 2 and 3) is connected to the station building by a footbridge. The station has a Midori no Madoguchi ticket office.

=== Platforms ===
1	■ Jōetsu Line	for Shibukawa and Takasaki
2/3	■ Jōetsu Line	for Minakami and Nagaoka

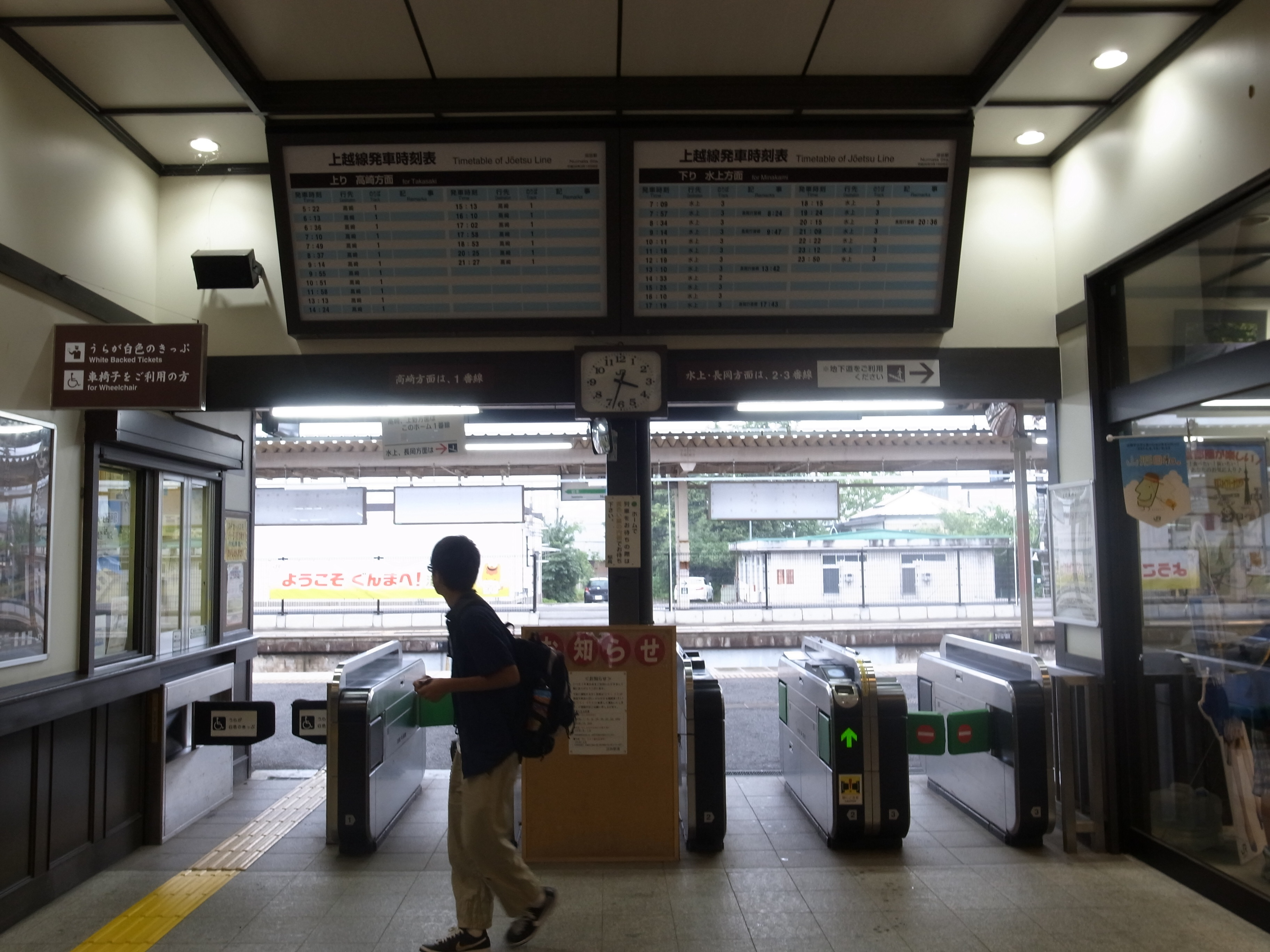
The ticket barriers, August 2014

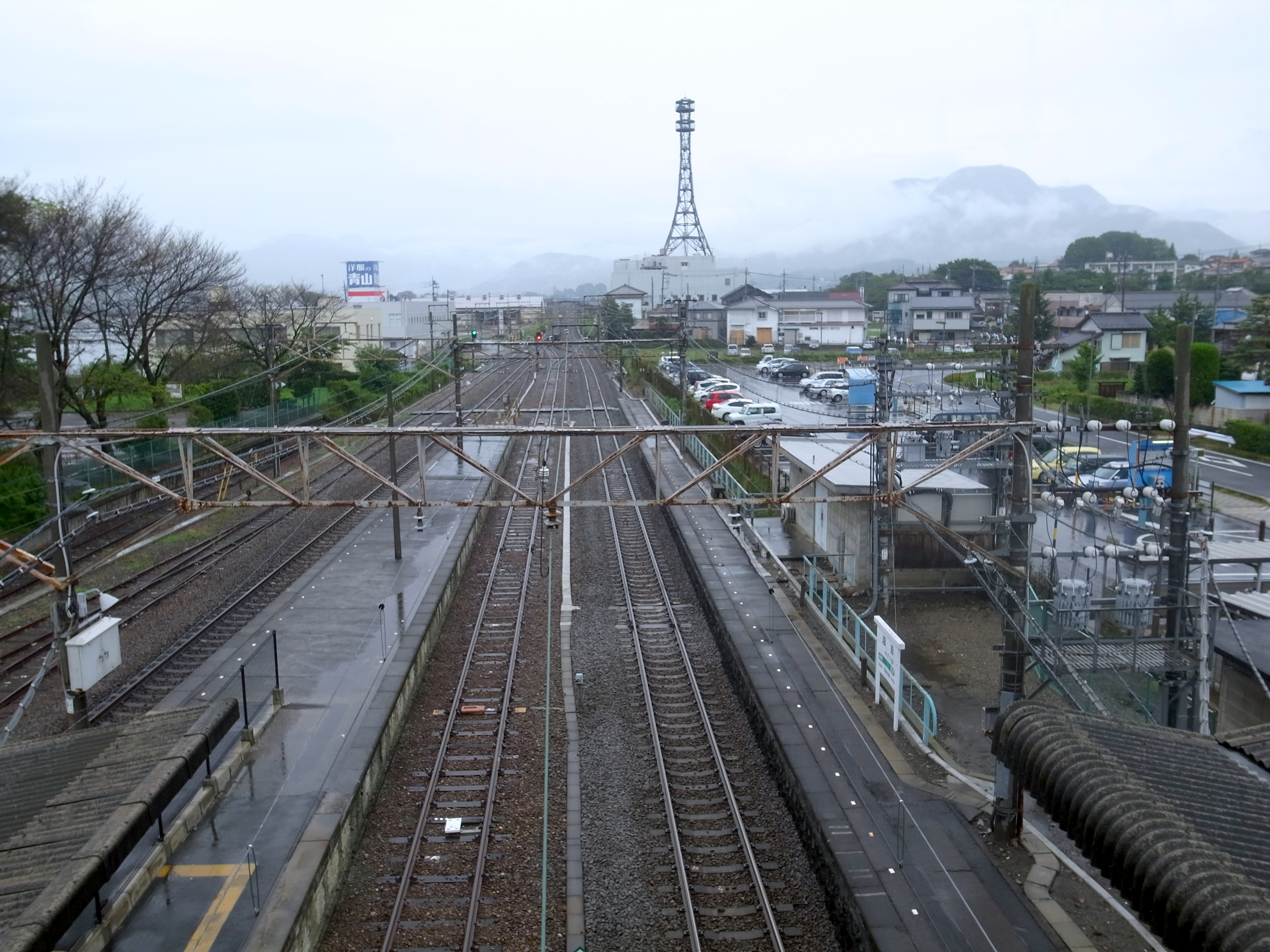
Overview of the station platforms, looking north, August 2014

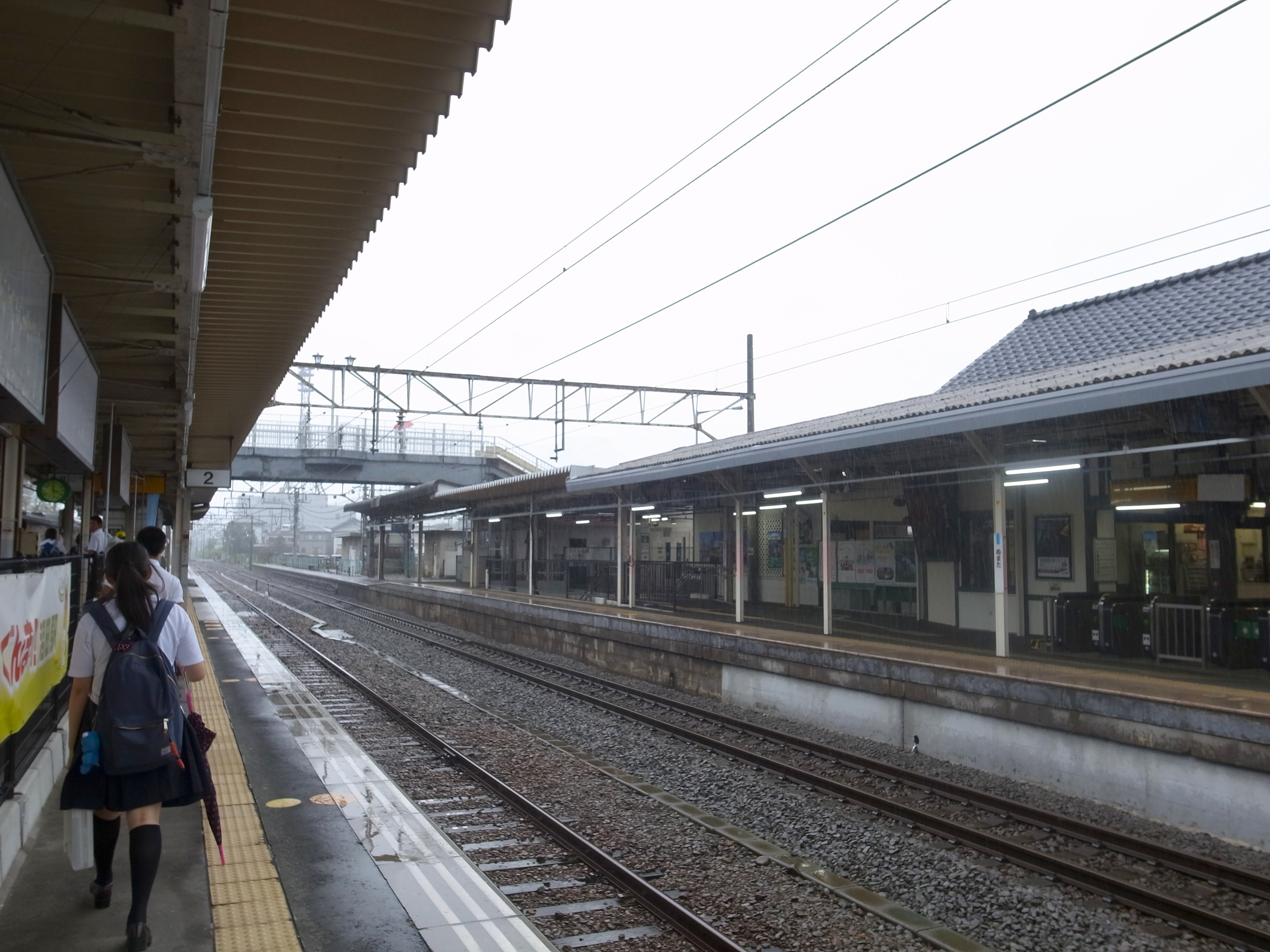
The view from platform 2, looking north, August 2014

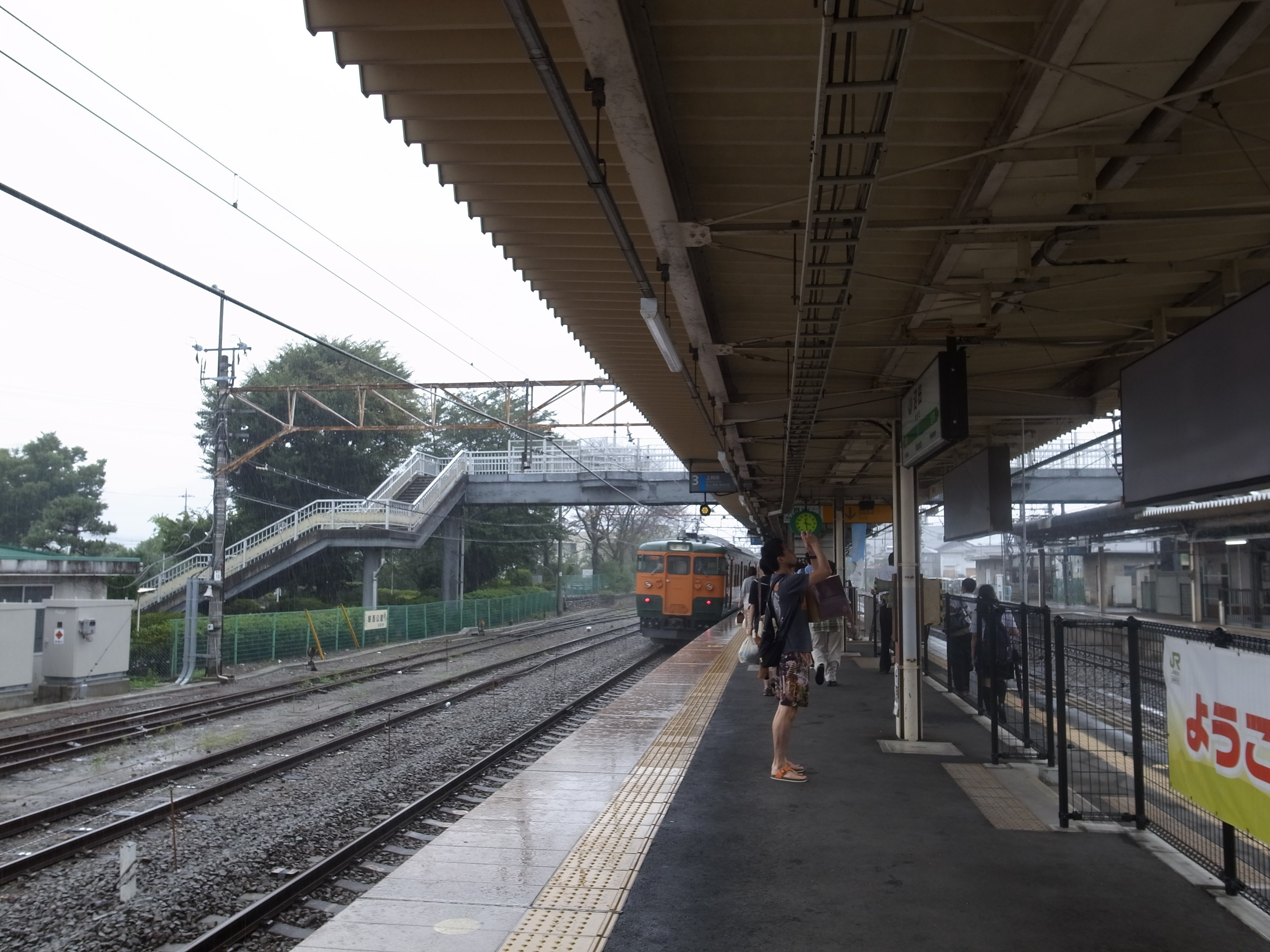
Platform 3, looking north, August 2014

== History ==
Numata Station opened on 31 March 1924. Upon the privatization of the Japanese National Railways (JNR) on 1 April 1987, it came under the control of JR East.

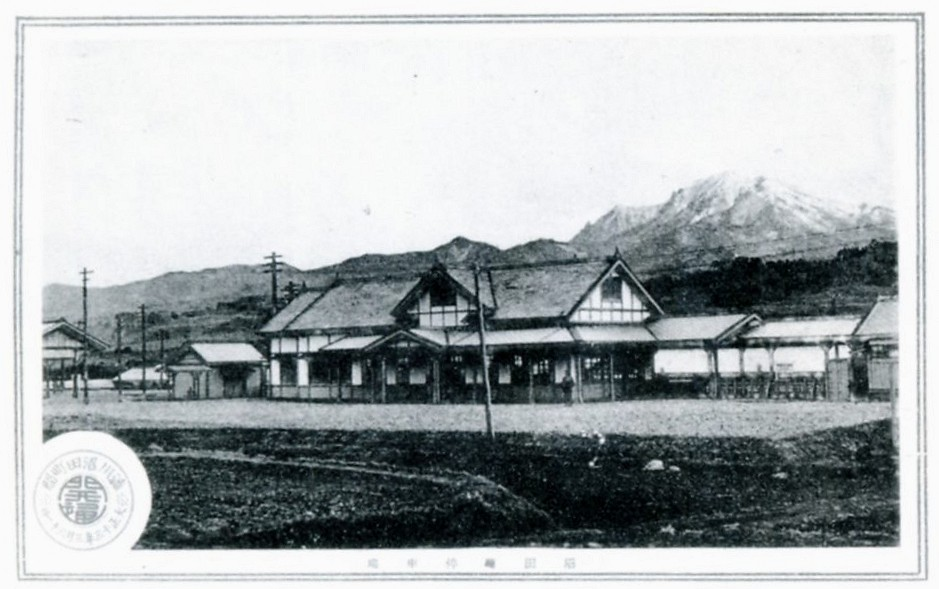
Numata Station at the time of its opening in 1924

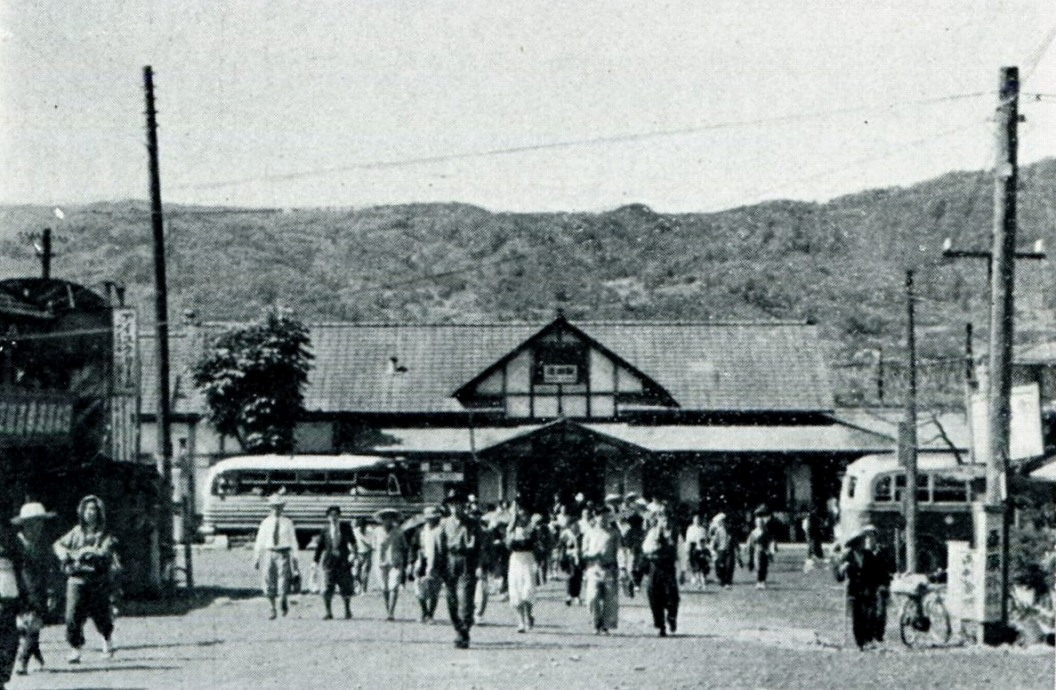
The station in 1952

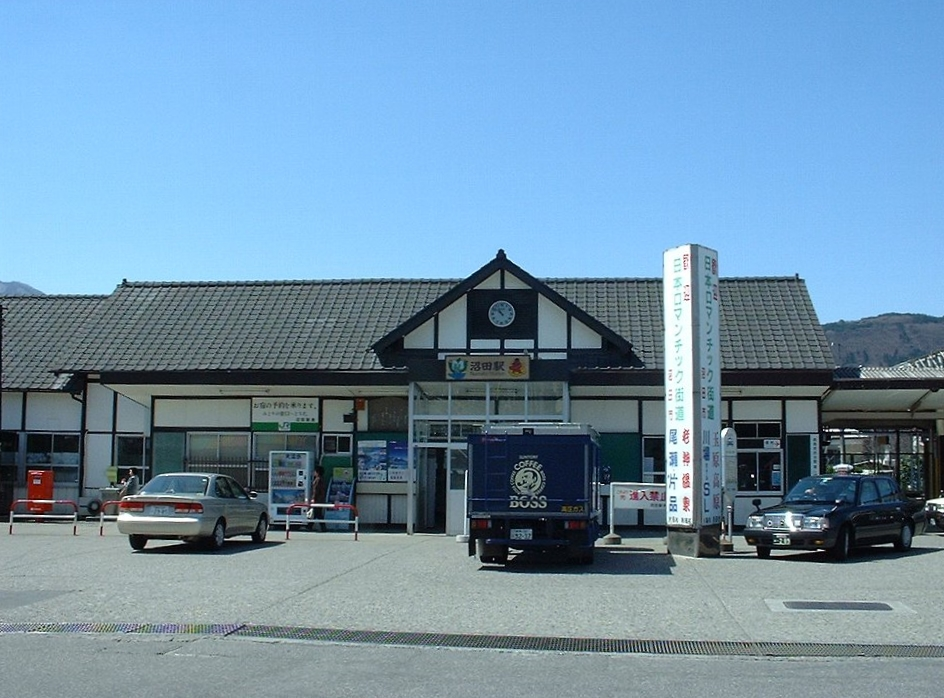
The station in 2003

== Passenger statistics ==
In fiscal 2019, the station was used by an average of 1622 passengers daily (boarding passengers only).

== Surrounding area ==
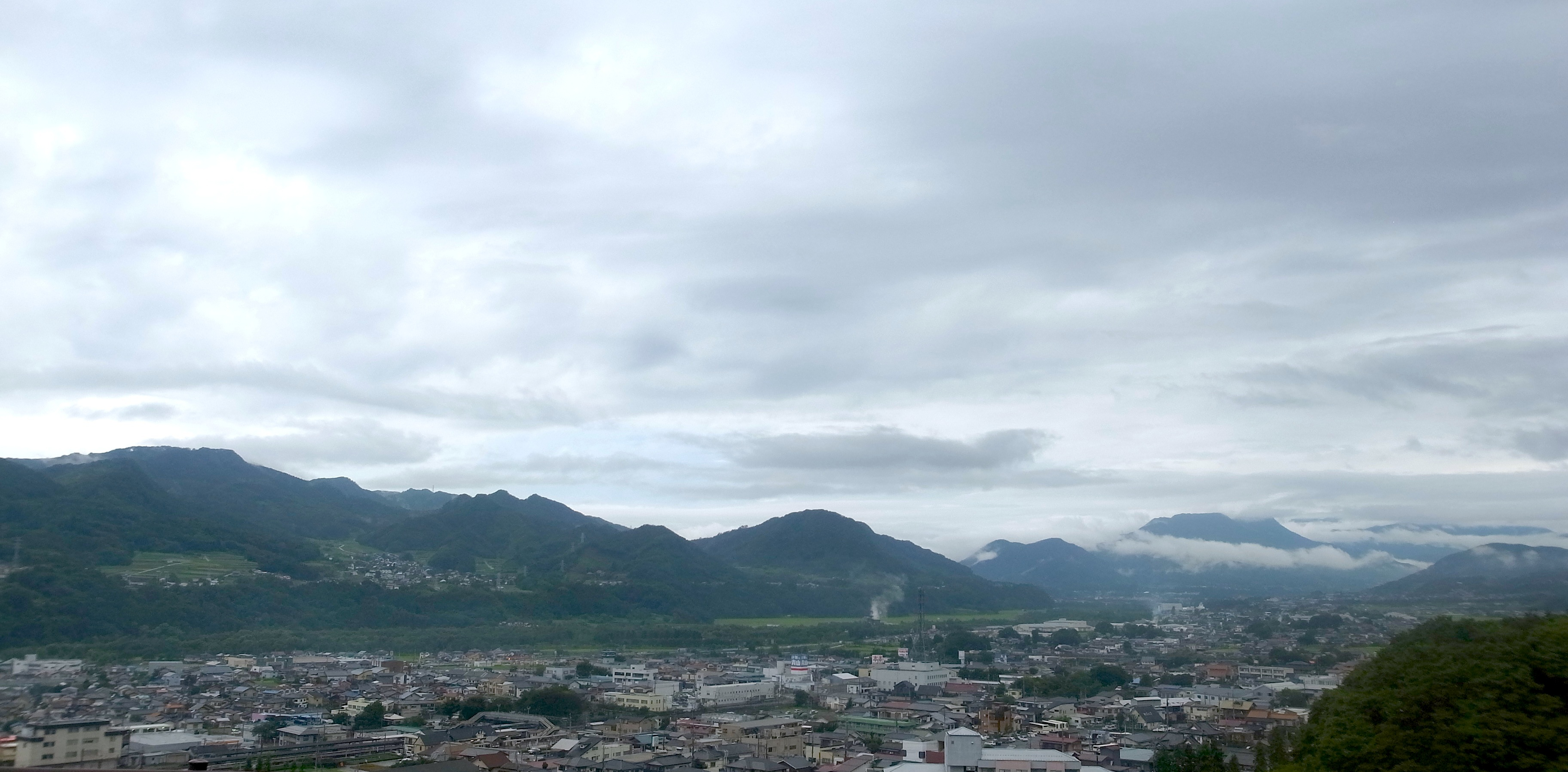
An overview of Numata, with the station visible at the bottom left, August 2014

- Numata City Hall
- Numata Post Office
- Site of Numata Castle
- National Route 17

== See also ==
- List of railway stations in Japan
