= Sengoku Basara: End of Judgement =

Japanese anime television series

- Sengoku Basara: End of Judgement key visual

戦国BASARA Judge End (Sengoku Basara Judge End)
- Genre: Action
- Created by: Capcom
- Anime television series
- Directed by: Takashi Sano
- Produced by: Toshio Nakatani; Ai Morikawa; Atsushi Kirimoto; Kōhei Itō
- Written by: Natsuko Takahashi
- Music by: Masahiro Tokuda
- Studio: Telecom Animation Film
- Licensed by: AUS: Viewster; NA: Crunchyroll
- Original network: Nippon TV
- Original run: July 6, 2014 – September 27, 2014
- Episodes: 12

Sengoku Basara: End of Judgement (Japanese: 戦国BASARA Judge End, Hepburn: Sengoku Basara Judge End) is an anime television series based on the Sengoku Basara games originally created by CAPCOM. It began airing on July 6, 2014, on NTV and tells its own version of the story from the video game Sengoku Basara: Samurai Heroes.

Unlike the previous anime adaptations (Sengoku Basara: Samurai Kings), this series is produced by Nippon Television, VAP and Telecom Animation Film and directed by Takashi Sano, with Natsuko Takahashi handling series composition, Michinori Chiba designing the characters and Masahiro Tokuda composing the music.

== Development ==
On the January 19, 2014, Sengoku Basara 4 Basara Matsuri 2014 event at the Nippon Seinenkan Great Hall, that a new television anime project for its Sengoku Basara franchise is in the works which later called "Sengoku Basara: Judge End".

== Plot ==
This series begins with Tokugawa Ieyasu betraying and killing Toyotomi Hideyoshi. Several groups start forming alliances in preparation of the upcoming Battle of Sekigahara.

== Music ==
The opening theme song is "Thunderclap" by Fear, and Loathing in Las Vegas and the ending song is "Hokkyokusei ~Polaris~ (北極星～ポラリス～)" by Chiaki Ishikawa.

== Characters ==
Although all characters are credited with their family name first, they will be placed last in this section for better reference.

=== Date Clan ===
Masamune Date (伊達政宗, Date Masamune)

- Voiced by: Kazuya Nakai (Japanese); Robert McCollum (English)

Kojūrō Katakura (片倉小十郎, Katakura Kojūrō)

- Voiced by: Toshiyuki Morikawa (Japanese); Travis Willingham (English)

=== Takeda Clan ===
Yukimura Sanada (真田幸村, Sanada Yukimura)

- Voiced by: Sōichirō Hoshi (Japanese); Johnny Yong Bosch (English)

Sasuke Sarutobi (猿飛佐助, Sarutobi Sasuke)

- Voiced by: Takehito Koyasu (Japanese); Michael Sinterniklaas (English)

Shingen Takeda (武田信玄, Takeda Shingen)

- Voiced by: Tessho Genda (Japanese); Christopher Ayres (English)

=== Tokugawa Clan ===
Ieyasu Tokugawa (徳川家康, Tokugawa Ieyasu)

- Voiced by: Toru Okawa (Japanese); Liam O'Brien (English)

Tadakatsu Honda (本多忠勝, Honda Tadakatsu)

Tadatsugu Sakai (酒井忠次, Sakai Tadatsugu)

- Voiced by: Takanori Nishikawa (Japanese); Ian Sinclair (English)

=== Toyotomi Clan ===
Mitsunari Ishida (石田三成, Ishida Mitsunari)

- Voiced by: Tomokazu Seki (Japanese); Matthew Mercer (English)

Yoshitsugu Ōtani (大谷吉継, Ōtani Yoshitsugu)

- Voiced by: Fumihiko Tachiki (Japanese); Mark Stoddard (English)

Hideyoshi Toyotomi (豊臣秀吉, Toyotomi Hideyoshi)

- Voiced by: Ryōtarō Okiayu (Japanese); Christopher R. Sabat (English)

Hanbei Takenaka (竹中半兵衛, Takenaka Hanbei)

- Voiced by: Akira Ishida (Japanese); Chris Cason (English)

=== Uesugi Clan ===
Kenshin Uesugi (上杉謙信, Uesugi Kenshin)

- Voiced by: Romi Park (Japanese); Greg Ayres (English)

Kasuga (かすが)

- Voiced by: Natsuko Kuwatani (Japanese); Stephanie Sheh (English)

=== Maeda Clan ===
Keiji Maeda (前田慶次, Maeda Keiji)

- Voiced by: Masakazu Morita (Japanese); Eric Vale (English)

Matsu (まつ, Maeda Matsu)

- Voiced by: Yuko Kaida (Japanese); Jamie Marchi (English)

=== Kobayakawa Clan ===
Hideaki Kobayakawa (小早川秀秋, Kobayakawa Hideaki)

- Voiced by: Jun Fukuyama (Japanese); Tony Oliver (English)

Tenkai (天海, Tenkai)

- Voiced by: Sho Hayami (Japanese); Vic Mignogna (English)

=== Hōjō Clan ===
Ujimasa Hōjō (北条氏政, Hōjō Ujimasa)

- Voiced by: Tadashi Miyazawa (Japanese); Sean Hennigan (English)

Kotarō Fūma (風魔小太郎, Fūma Kotarō)

=== Ōtomo Clan ===
Sōrin Ōtomo (大友宗麟, Ōtomo Sōrin)

- Voiced by: Noriaki Sugiyama (Japanese); Brittney Karbowski (English)

Muneshige Tachibana (立花宗茂, Tachibana Muneshige)

- Voiced by: Tetsu Inada (Japanese); Kyle Herbert (English)

=== Other Clans ===
Motochika Chōsokabe (長宗我部元親, Chōsokabe Motochika)

- Voiced by: Ryuzo Ishino (Japanese); Patrick Seitz (English)

Kazumasa Isono (磯野員昌, Isono Kazumasa)

- Voiced by: Yōji Ueda

Kanbei Kuroda (黒田官兵衛, Kuroda Kanbei)

- Voiced by: Rikiya Koyama (Japanese); Richard Epcar (English)

Motonari Mōri (毛利元就, Mōri Motonari)

- Voiced by: Shigeru Nakahara (Japanese); Sam Riegel (English)

Oichi (お市, Oichi)

- Voiced by: Mamiko Noto (Japanese); Laura Bailey (English)

Magoichi Saika (雑賀孫市, Saika Magoichi)

- Voiced by: Sayaka Ohara (Japanese); Karen Strassman (English)

Yoshihiro Shimazu (島津義弘, Shimazu Yoshihiro)

- Voiced by: Kenichi Ogata (Japanese); R Bruce Elliott (English)

Tsuruhime (鶴姫, Tsuruhime)

- Voiced by: Ami Koshimizu (Japanese); Kat Steel (English)

== Episode list ==
No.	Title	Original release date
1	"Rift"; Transliteration: "Ketsubetsu" (Japanese: 決別)	July 5, 2014
During the Third Siege of Odawara, Hideyoshi Toyotomi has declared war on Ujimasa Hōjō at Odawara Castle. Hanbei Takenaka is shown to be gradually dying from an illness. Magoichi Saika breaches the west gate, while Ieyasu Tokugawa and Tadatsugu Sakai are caught off guard when the east gate left unguarded is soon breached by Yoshitsugu Ōtani. Kasuga encounters Sasuke Sarutobi spying from a tree outside the fortress. Masamune Date and Kojūrō Katakura make their way towards Odawara Castle, only to be intercepted by Mitsunari Ishida at Sekigahara. Ieyasu pleads for Hideyoshi to withdraw his army, in which Ieyasu declares that he would rule the land on common bonds. After an intense duel, Hideyoshi is eventually defeated by Ieyasu. Mitsunari leaves Masamune and Kojūrō critically injured before finding out that Hideyoshi was killed by Ieyasu, now branded as a traitor. Hanbei finally succumbs to his illness, leading Misunari to plot his revenge on Ieyasu.
2	"Chaos"; Transliteration: "Ranse" (Japanese: 乱世)	July 12, 2014
While carrying an unconscious Masamune on horseback, Kojūrō evades an ambush in the forest, but finds himself in the territory owned by Kenshin Uesugi. Ieyasu returns to the place where he was attacked by Shingen Takeda during the Battle of Mikatagahara, springing forth another attack between armies led by Ieyasu and Shingen. Kenshin calls Kojūrō a worthless leader and lets him continue on his journey. Sasuke fends off Ieyasu's army, while Shingen's old friend Yoshihiro Shimazu challenges Tadakatsu Honda to a duel. Shingen suddenly falls ill after bestowing his leadership to Yukimura, which forces Sasuke to call a full retreat, much to Ieyasu's surprise. Motochika Chōsokabe witnesses the aftermath of the Battle of Nakatomigawa at Shikoku seemingly caused by Ieyasu. Motonari Mōri tells Yoshitsugu of his plan to secure his territory away from Ieyasu. Oichi proclaims that the light of Ieyasu and the dark of Mitsunari will soon clash and issue forth oblivion.
3	"Alliances"; Transliteration: "Doumei" (Japanese: 同盟)	July 19, 2014
Tasking Tadatsugu to hold down the fort, Ieyasu leaves with Tadakatsu to continue his mission. Ieyasu offers Magoichi to join in his cause. In the forest, Motochika is halted by Tsuruhime while on his way to see Magoichi. As Mitsunari passes by, he picks a fight with Motochika due to their shared hatred for Ieyasu, who is then seen hovering over the forest on top of Tadakatsu. Mitsunari then confronts Magoichi for betraying her loyalty to Hideyoshi, but Magoichi states that her contract was null after Hideyoshi's death. Keiji Maeda also visits Magoichi, explaining that Ieyasu has kidnapped his sister-in-law Matsu. With that said, Magoichi ultimately decides to enter into a contract with Keiji. Motochika follows Mitsunari to Odawara Castle, where Yoshitsugu informs them that Ieyasu abducted Oichi, cajoled Ujimasa in his cause and convinced Kotarō Fūma as well. Ieyasu learns that Kenshin wants no part in forging bonds, Yukimura feels like this is a call to surrender and Masamune is fixated on trying to kill Mitsunari.
4	"Astray"; Transliteration: "Meisou" (Japanese: 迷走)	July 27, 2014
Much to Sasuke's concern, Yukimura plans to duel Kenshin in honor of Shingen. Yukimura is easily pushed into a lake by Kenshin, who shames Yukimura for learning nothing from Shingen. As Yukimura swims up to shore, Kenshin still believes that Yukimura could become Shingen's successor. Since Kenshin will not be a part of the conflict between the east and the west, he orders Kasuga to look after Sasuke. Mitsunari, Yoshitsugu and Motonari pay a visit to Hideaki Kobayakawa at Okayama Castle, where Hideaki admits to Mitsunari that Ieyasu showed up unannounced earlier in an attempt to form an alliance. Yoshitsugu and Motonari discover that Tenkai was the one who kidnapped Matsu. Back at Osaka Castle, Sasuke and Kasuga offer to form an alliance with Yoshitsugu. Instead, Sasuke is attacked by Mitsunari, while Kasuga is thwarted by Motochika. In a bidding move, Sasuke and Kasuga temporarily hold Yoshitsugu hostage while explaining that they have no affiliation with Ieyasu. Masamune and Kojūrō approach Yukimura at Ueda Castle, just as Sasuke arrives with Mitsunari. When Mitsunari fails to recall his previous fight with Masamune at Odawara Castle, Yukimura prevents Masamune from attacking Mitsunari.
5	"Defeat"; Transliteration: "Haiboku" (Japanese: 敗北)	August 2, 2014
Yukimura does his best to stop Masamune from getting to Mitsunari. As Mitsunari takes his leave, Sasuke shields Yukimura from getting hurt, while Kojūrō puts a stop to this senseless duel. At Osaka Castle, Yoshitsugu employs Motochika to collaborate with Mori and recruit Kanbei Kuroda, Yoshihiro and Sōrin Ōtomo, leaders from Kyushu in the south. In the Owari Domain, Ieyasu has a setback despite clarifying that Oichi is safely being held at Sunpu Castle. Later on, Ieyasu, Tadakatsu and Kotarō rescue Tsuruhime and Ujimasa from being attacked by men within the territory of Odawara. Despite Kojūrō's concern, Masamune goes en route to Sunpu Castle in order to settle the score with Ieyasu. In the Satsuma Domain, Motochika successfully recruits Yoshihiro after they briefly spar. Mori receives an awkward greeting from Sōrin in the Mori Domain (Bungo), much to the embarrassment of Muneshige Tachibana. In Ishigakibaru, Kanbei agrees to join forces with Motochika if a key is found to unlock his shackles. At Sunpu Castle, Ieyasu easily wins a fight against Masamune, while Kojūrō recalls how Masamune felt when he previously lost against Mitsunari.
6	"Declarations"; Transliteration: "Sengen" (Japanese: 宣言)	August 9, 2014
Kojūrō beats some sense into Masamune, recalling when he selfishly refused to retreat during his first battle. Yukimiura heads to Osaka Castle after proving himself worthy as a commander to Sasuke. Motochika brings Kanbei to Tsuruhime, who foresees that Kotarō has the key to unlock Kanbei's shackles. It is shown that Ieyasu, Tadatsugu and Kotarō are safeguarding Oichi at Sunpu Castle. Taking Motochika to see Keiji and Magoichi, Tsuruhime believes that Ieyasu is harboring sorrow in his heart. After debunking Motochika's claim that Ieysasu was the one who left behind a yellow banner after the Battle of Nakatomigawa, Magoichi encourages Motochika to go see Ieyasu, while Keiji offers to accompany Motochika. Yukimura fights Mitsunari at Osaka Castle for having a petty vendetta, while Masamune challenges Ieyasu to a rematch at Sunpu Castle after coming to terms with himself. As both pairs end their duels in a draw, Yukimura agrees to form his alliance with the west, while Masamune agrees to form his alliance with the east.
7	"Darkness"; Transliteration: "Ankoku" (Japanese: 闇黒)	August 16, 2014
With Keiji accompanying him, Motochika arrives at Sunpu Castle to speak with Ieyasu. Surprisingly, two of Ieyasu's soldiers previously sold yellow banners to Motonari. Yoshitsugu assigns Tenkai and Kazumasa Isono to assist Yukimura in rescuing Oichi. Yukimura, Sasuke, Kasuga, Tenkai, Kazumasa and Matsu head to Sunpu Castle. Motochika severs ties with Mitsunari, leading Mitsunari to question Yoshitsugu about a secret attack that was launched at Shikoku. Tenkai gathers intel that Oichi is being hold in an underground prison. However, this is a trap set by Kotarō before Keiji and Magoichi surround the area. Finding Oichi bound to a barrier of daggers inside a secluded room, Tsuruhime is saved by Kasuga just when Oichi fully awakens, breaks free and wreaks havoc. The underground prison collapses, leading to a cave underneath Sunpu Castle. Kazumasa is slashed by Tenkai, while Kasuga is held captive by Oichi. Yukimura and Sasuke escape through the cave, while Keiji and Magoichi reunite with Matsu. As Mitsunari visits Hideyoshi's grave, he briefly encounters Ieyasu, who wishes to end their conflict at their promised meeting place.
8	"Promise"; Transliteration: "Yakusoku" (Japanese: 約束)	August 23, 2014
Masamune and Kojūrō take a detour past Lake Biwa towards Osaka. Matsu reveals to Keiji and Magoichi that Tenkai plans to use Oichi as a medium for resurrecting Nobunaga Oda. As Yukimura and Sasuke find Masamune and Kojūrō at Osaka, both Yukimura and Masamune explain the reasoning behind their respective alliances with Mitsunari and Ieyasu before parting ways. When Yukimura reports to Mitsunari about Tenkai's ulterior motive with Oichi, Mitsunari is bereft of words when Yoshitsugu was not aware of this. Ieyasu recalls when he fought alongside Mitsunari at Sekigahara in order to fend off troops from the east and the west, creating a chasm that symbolized a divided country. Both Mitsunari and Ieyasu give compelling speeches to their respective allied forces. Mitsunari honors Hideyoshi's legacy and slanders Ieyasu's name, while Ieyasu doubles down on campaigning for a united country to the point of riskily allowing anyone to switch sides of alliance.
9	"Sekigahara"; Transliteration: "Sekigahara" (Japanese: 関ヶ原)	September 6, 2014
The western and eastern forces meet at the chasm of Sekigahara. At the start of battle, the vanguard of the western and eastern forces are sent out to the battlefield. Sōrin, Hideaki, Yoshihiro, Motonari and Motochika each arrive with their armies as support. As Tadakatsu is launched into the battlefield, Yoshihiro is signaled to fight back. While Hideaki struggles to choose which alliance to join, Sōrin encourages Tadatsugu to be reborn as "Revolution". Tsuruhime is attacked by Motonari until Motochika intercepts and challenges him to a duel. Tenkai walks into the middle of the battlefield, seemingly leading remnants of the Oda clan in the form of zombies as a third force. Sasuke proceeds to fend off the third force, while Hideaki chooses to ally himself with Tenkai after witnessing his arm injury. Keiji, Matsu and Magoichi arrive in an attempt to stop Tenkai, who then summon Oichi out of hiding. Oichi remembers that Tenkai, previously known as Mitsuhide Akechi, was the one who previously killed her brother Nobunaga. Against her will, Oichi summons a dark cloud that hovers over the chasm, while Yukimura and Masamune are both sent to confront it.
10	"Life-and-Death"; Transliteration: "Shitou" (Japanese: 死闘)	September 13, 2014
After urging Hideaki to return to his territory, Tenkai enters Honnō-ji Temple and eagerly waits for Oichi to resurrect Nobunaga. Sasuke, Keiji, Matsu and Magoichi continue to fend off the third force with regenerative abilities before Yukimura and Masamune arrive to assist. While Motochika and Motonari continue to square off, Keiji, Matsu and Magoichi enter Honnō-ji Temple, where Oichi kills Tenkai by stabbing him in the back. With Oichi impervious to Magoichi's ammunition, Matsu tries to help Oichi recall fond memories of her late husband Nagamasa Azai. This distraction gives Magoichi a clear shot from behind when Keiji restrains Oichi. As a result, Oichi is finally released from her demonic spell and the third force is dispelled into thin air, allowing Sasuke to rescue Kasuga. Tsuruhime clarifies to Kanbei that a crow in the sky has the key to unlock his shackles. Masamune heads off to confront Mitsunari, while Kojūrō takes on Yoshitsugu. Challenging Ieyasu to a duel, Yukimura accuses Ieyasu of severing bonds instead of forging them. The duel ends in a draw, as Yukimura expresses his determination to fulfill his heartfelt desire of defeating Masamune someday.
11	"Verdict"; Transliteration: "Shinpan" (Japanese: 審判)	September 20, 2014
Masamune pesters Mitsunari into a fated rematch. Despite Yoshitsugu's desire for the world to be engulfed in equal misery, his sympathy Mitsunari causes him to be eventually defeated by Kojūrō. While in the sky above, both Tadakatsu and Yoshihiro plummet into the ground below after a valiant match. Using the rays of the Sun, Motonari traps Motochika inside a ring of fire. This prompts Motochika to leap into action and charge straight at Motonari by casting a shadow over the Sun. Exploiting Motonari for living in solitude, Motochika garners support from his surviving crew members, finally blasting Motonari to smithereens. Kojūrō witnesses the fierce duel between Masamune and Mitsunari. Masamune proves to hold his own, but chooses to spare Mitsunari's life out of pity. Telling Yukimura that Mitsunari is easily hurt due to his pure heart, Ieyasu admits guilt to deceiving the country with his vision of shared bonds. Tadakatsu and Yoshitsugu each release their power beads into the clouds before falling unconscious. A green tunnel is manifested over the chasm, as Ieyasu and Mitsunari meet in the middle during a solar eclipse.
12	"Guide"; Transliteration: "Shirube" (Japanese: 標)	September 27, 2014
Inside the green tunnel, Ieyasu and Mitsunari face off in a fight to the finish, while Masamune and Yukimura watch from the distance. Expressing his disgust for the paradox of Ieyasu's vision for shared bonds, Mitsunari refuses to forgive Ieyasu for Hideyoshi's death. Mitsunari and Ieyasu defeat each other in a final clash, ending the battle in a draw, which dissolves the green tunnel and stops the solar eclipse. However, a tree grows in the center of the chasm. In the aftermath, Matsu reunites with her family, while Keiji decides to forgo his payment for his contract with Magoichi. Both Tadakatsu and Yoshitsugu are shown to have recovered, as life returns to normal for many. Later on, Yukimura and Masamune each lead the second act of the battle with their respective allied forces there to support them.

== See also ==
- List of Sengoku Basara characters (from the video game)
- List of Sengoku Basara episodes
