= Devil Kings =

2005 video game

- North American cover art
- Developer: Capcom
- Publisher: Capcom
- Director: Makoto Yamamoto
- Producer: Hiroyuki Kobayashi
- Designer: Mitsuru Endo
- Programmer: Yasuyuki Saito
- Artists: Makoto Tsuchibayashi (character); Hirokazu Yonezuka (background); Hideaki Tanaka (visual effects)
- Composers: Masayoshi Ishi; Marika Suzuki
- Series: Sengoku Basara
- Engine: CRIWARE
- Platforms: PlayStation 2, PlayStation Network
- Release: PlayStation 2: JP: July 21, 2005; NA: October 11, 2005; EU: February 3, 2006; AU: February 16, 2006; PlayStation Network: JP: June 19, 2013
- Genre: Hack and slash
- Mode: Single-player

Devil Kings, known in Japan as Sengoku Basara (戦国BASARA), is a 2005 hack and slash game developed and published by Capcom for the PlayStation 2. It is the first installment in the Sengoku Basara franchise. The game's theme song for the Japanese version is "Crosswise" by T.M.Revolution. The western version featured a prologue, along with an original piece, due to license restrictions. The game was followed by several sequels and an anime series, all of them using the original title and setting of Sengoku Basara only.

== Story ==
Sengoku Basara takes place during the Sengoku period, or Warring States period, of feudal Japan during which Japan was split into many minor states battling over power and land. The game features two historical warlords as the main protagonists: Date Masamune and Sanada Yukimura.

Devil Kings' main character is Devil King (Oda Nobunaga in Sengoku Basara).

== Gameplay ==
It is a hack and slash, action game similar in concept to Devil May Cry, Dynasty Warriors and Samurai Warriors.

Some significant gameplay changes were made to the Western versions of the game. Four of the characters were made non-playable and various skills were removed or added. The difficulty levels were shifted to make the game more difficult (with the Japanese Normal becoming Easy and Japanese Hard becoming Normal, and Easy rewards 30% less EXP and no 3rd+ weapons while Normal keeps the Japanese Normal reward). The fighting system was also modified, adding an element called "Priming" (one of the characters special attack was made the priming attack, and used that attack to "Prime" enemies making them more susceptible to damage and allowing for higher combo chains). These modifications affected how quickly players developed their character and how they fought during battles in the Western version of the game. The Priming mechanic in particular made it possible for players to prepare enemies before they could execute longer and stronger combos.

== Characters ==
- Date Masamune (Azure Dragon): Kazuya Nakai/Kirby Morrow
- Sanada Yukimura (Scorpio): Sōichirō Hoshi/Andrew Francis
- Takeda Shingen (Red Minotaur): Tesshō Genda/Mark Gibbon
- Sarutobi Sasuke (Talon): Takehito Koyasu/David Orth
- Kasuga (Venus): Natsuko Kuwatani/Venus Terzo
- Oda Nobunaga (Devil King): Norio Wakamoto/Garry Chalk
- Nōhime (Lady Butterfly): Yurika Hino/Kathleen Barr
- Mori Ranmaru (Hornet): Hiroki Shimowada/Cathy Weseluck
- Akechi Mitsuhide (Reaper): Shō Hayami/Peter Kelamis
- Uesugi Kenshin (Frost): Romi Park/Alessandro Juliani
- Itsuki (Puff): Tomoko Kawakami/Janyse Jaud
- Xavi (Q-Ball): Kōzō Shioya/Lee Tockar
- Maeda Toshiie (Lark): Tomohiro Tsuboi/Andrew Jackson
- Matsu (Bramble): Yūko Kaida/Tabitha St. Germain
- Shimazu Yoshihiro (Zaan): Kenichi Ogata/Paul Dobson
- Tokugawa Ieyasu (Irdene): Tōru Ōkawa/Jason Michas
- Mōri Motonari (Kahz): Shigeru Nakahara/Sam Vincent
- Chōsokabe Motochika (Arslan): Ryūzō Ishino/Ian James Corlett
- Hōjō Ujimasa (Orwik): Tadashi Miyazawa/Louis Chirillo
- Imagawa Yoshimoto (Muri): Kōzō Shioya/Brian Drummond
- Honda Tadakatsu (Iron OX)

== Localization ==
While releasing Sengoku Basara, Capcom attempted to appeal to the western audience, by removing all Sengoku and Japanese references in favor of a generic fantasy story vaguely connected with Capcom's hit franchise Devil May Cry (a DMC-type font was even used for the cover title of Devil Kings).

An extract from IGN interview with the game's producer Hiroyuki Kobayashi:

Kobayashi: In Japan, Devil Kings is called Sengoku Basara, and it focuses on Japanese history but with a Capcom style, a Capcom flair to it. When we were making the game, we told ourselves, "What can we do to differentiate this to make this different from other hack and slash games?" And we decided the secret maybe lay in some other games Capcom has done. We said, "Let's give the characters a kind of Devil May Cry flair -- some really cool moves, like the kind of things you might see in Devil May Cry. Let's make the characters all vastly and distinctly different from one another, like in Street Fighter II." That's the Japanese version. Then, we said, "Okay, let's release it in North America and Europe -- what can we do to make it different again? What can we do to make it appeal to North American and European audiences?" After a few discussions, we decided not to have a game with samurais and ninjas in feudal Japan, but instead a game that was dark, slightly devilish, and had a fantasy setting to it, a game with a huge Devil May Cry feel to it. So then we said, "Okay, we'll make it dark." Call it Devil Kings. The main character will be a villain. We'll darken up the background, give more moves, more ability to power your character up, and things like that for the North American and European markets.

IGN: Plus it's not historically accurate?

Kobayashi: The Japanese version of the game is based on Japanese history. There are some fantasy elements that didn't actually happen, of course, but enough of it is there. With the North American and European versions, we've taken that element out entirely. Some of the backgrounds may retain that Japanese flair. Many of them don't and are brand new; many of the enemies are brand new; and it's no longer based around the idea of feudal Japan at all. That part of the game has now been changed to be darker.

These alterations were regarded as unpopular, as the Devil Kings version was a critical and commercial failure, and no more Sengoku Basara games were brought to North America and Europe until the release of Sengoku Basara: Samurai Heroes in the fall of 2010.

== Reception ==
Reception

Aggregate score
Aggregator	Score
Metacritic	64/100

Review scores
Publication	Score
Edge	6/10
Electronic Gaming Monthly	6.33/10
Eurogamer	7/10
Famitsu	31/40
Game Informer	6.5/10
GameSpot	7.5/10
GameSpy	3.5/5
GameZone	6.7/10
IGN	5.9/10
Official U.S. PlayStation Magazine	1.5/5
The Sydney Morning Herald	3/5

The westernized version (Devil Kings) received "mixed or average" reviews according to the review aggregation website Metacritic.

The Japanese version was met with "generally favorable" reviews from fans, critics, and consumers. Fans of the franchise seem to have given the Japanese version positive reviews and the westernized version negative reviews with one stating, "While Sengoku Basara was considered a cult classic among fans and gamers, Devil Kings was considered a terrible localization of a good game that should've been left unchanged for its western releases." The game received an 8/8/7/8 for a total of 31/40 from weekly Japanese video game magazine, Famitsu. The game was later re-released under the PlayStation 2 the Best label (which means it is a best-seller in Japan). The game sold a total of 88,711 units during its first week on sale in Japan and was the top-selling game of the week. The game has sold a total of 232,589 units in Japan.

== Sequels ==
The first two sequels, Sengoku Basara 2 and Sengoku Basara 2 Heroes, were released in Japan for the PS2 in 2006–2007, followed by two spin-off games. The next main game in the series, Sengoku Basara 3, was announced for the PlayStation 3 and Wii and released on July 29, 2010, in Japan. It was released in North America and Europe as Sengoku Basara Samurai Heroes in October 2010.

== See also ==
- Sengoku Basara (anime)
