= Sengoku Basara: Samurai Kings =

Japanese anime television series

- Cover of the first DVD volume (Date Masamune and Katakura Kojūrō)

戦国BASARA (Sengoku Basara)
- Created by: Capcom
- Anime television series
- Directed by: Itsuro Kawasaki (season 1); Kazuya Nomura (season 2)
- Produced by: Fumi Teranishi; Tetsuya Kinoshita; Toshihiro Maeda; George Wada; Kozue Kaneniwa; Yukio Yoshimura; Keiichi Nozaki; Yoshihiro Iwasa
- Written by: Yasuyuki Mutō
- Music by: Hiroyuki Sawano
- Studio: Production I.G
- Licensed by: AUS: Madman Entertainment; NA: Crunchyroll; UK: Manga Entertainment
- Original network: JNN (CBC, UTY, TBS, MBS, HBC, TBC, RKB), Animax
- English network: US: FUNimation Channel
- Original run: April 2, 2009 – September 26, 2010
- Episodes: 26

Sengoku Basara: Samurai Kings (Japanese: 戦国BASARA, Hepburn: Sengoku Basara) is a Japanese anime television series based on the Capcom video game series of the same name made by Production I.G, planned and written by Yasuyuki Muto, and chiefly directed by Itsuro Kawasaki. The series started broadcast on Japan's Chubu-Nippon Broadcasting (CBC) station in April 2009; other networks broadcast the episodes within a few days, including TBS, MBS, and Animax. Its first season made its North American television debut on the Funimation Channel on November 16, 2010.

The series was followed by a second season directed by Kazuya Nomura, Sengoku Basara: Samurai Kings II, which began broadcast in July 2010; and a film, Sengoku Basara: The Last Party, which was released on June 4, 2011. A new television series titled Sengoku Basara: End of Judgement began airing on July 6, 2014. This series is based on the video game Sengoku Basara: Samurai Heroes and, unlike the previous series, is animated by Telecom Animation Film.

== Plot ==
In the Sengoku Period of feudal Japan, many generals fought in an endless struggle for national power and unification. One man proved to be too big of a threat: the "Demon King of Owari", Oda Nobunaga. Date Masamune and Sanada Yukimura, two young warlords from different regions who become heated rivals, begin to form an unlikely alliance with the rest of the generals to take down the "demon king". The first series follows the emergence of the protagonists, particularly the main protagonists Masamune and Yukimura, and their struggle against Nobunaga, who seeks to conquer the land under him and is willing to crush anyone, even his own allies, to do it. It ends with his defeat at Masamune and Yukimura's hands.

The second series witnesses the emergence of Toyotomi Hideyoshi as the next potential unifier of the land, though, unlike in actual history, he has no connection to the Oda clan, whose retainers were almost entirely wiped out along with him by the end of the first season.

The film finale depicts Japan as being in turmoil once again as Ishida Mitsunari, former subordinate of Hideyoshi, cuts a wrath of fury across the land in order to fulfill his revenge while the other leaders rally for an era of peace. Masamune and Yukimura must fight Mitsunari in order to bring the country to peace as something strange is going on behind the scenes.

== Music ==
The opening theme song of the first season is "JAP" by Abingdon Boys School and its ending theme song is "Break & Peace" by Dustz. The second season's opening theme song is "Sword Summit" by T.M. Revolution and its ending theme songs are "El Dorado" and "Fate" by Angelo. The opening song for the movie is "FLAGS" by T.M. Revolution and the ending song is "The party must go on" by T.M. Revolution.

== Characters ==
Although all characters are credited with their family name first, they will be placed last in this section for better reference.

=== Date Clan ===
Masamune Date (伊達 政宗, Date Masamune)

- Voiced by: Kazuya Nakai (Japanese); Robert McCollum (English)

Masamune is the ruler of the Date clan and known as the "One-eyed Dragon of Oshu". He is a slightly cocky, ambitious warlord who tends to pepper his speech. He usually wields a single katana, but he can store and fight with six swords at once (three in each hand, held between the fingers). His six swords are referred to as "The Dragon's Claws". He is depicted as having a rival relationship with Yukimura.
Kojūrō Katakura (片倉小十郎, Katakura Kojūrō)

- Voiced by: Toshiyuki Morikawa (Japanese); Travis Willingham (English)

Kojūrō is Masamune's strategist and bodyguard in battle. He seems to agree with Masamune at some points in battle. He uses a katana and wakizashi set. He is referred to as "The Right Eye of the Dragon", for his skills as a bodyguard compensate for Masamune's missing right eye.

=== Takeda Clan ===
Yukimura Sanada (真田 幸村, Sanada Yukimura)

- Voiced by: Sōichirō Hoshi (Japanese); Johnny Yong Bosch (English)

Yukimura is among the most distinguished warriors in the Takeda clan, wielding two yari, and is very hot-blooded and fanatically loyal to the Takeda. He is often depicted in a rival relationship with Masamune. Although he always looks at it as a test of strength, he is a common "punching bag" for Shingen's unnecessary brawls.
Shingen Takeda (武田 信玄, Takeda Shingen)

- Voiced by: Tessho Genda (Japanese); Christopher Ayres (English)

Shingen is the leader of the Takeda clan, famous for its cavalry, and is known as "The Tiger of Kai". He has a large, imposing frame and a brilliant mind. He wields a giant axe. He often starts large and unnecessary brawls with Yukimura, sometimes for no reason, usually by wrestling or exchanging names while hitting each other.
Sasuke Sarutobi (猿飛 佐助, Sarutobi Sasuke)

- Voiced by: Takehito Koyasu (Japanese); Michael Sinterniklaas (English)

Sasuke is a ninja in the service of the Takeda clan. He is sneaky, cunning, and laid back but has a big sense of responsibility when necessary. Has a friendly rivalry with Kasuga, though the latter doesn't look at it that way. He wields two giant shuriken attached with an invisible razor wire. He also summons a crow familiar to glide down.

=== Uesugi Clan ===
Kenshin Uesugi (上杉 謙信, Uesugi Kenshin)

- Voiced by: Romi Park (Japanese); Greg Ayres (English)

Kenshin is the androgynous leader of the Uesugi clan, Takeda's rival and a devout monk to Bishamonten. Her/his accomplishments in battle earned her/him the moniker "The War God of Echigo". She/he wields a katana in a style using rapid movement and iaijutsu. Kenshin is female in the original Japanese, but is identified as a man in the English dub.

Kasuga (かすが)

- Voiced by: Natsuko Kuwatani (Japanese); Stephanie Sheh (English)

Kasuga is a ninja serving the Uesugi clan. She became drawn Kenshin at first sight (while attempting to assassinate her/him because of her father) and became her/his most loyal right-hand ninja. She takes her instructions seriously and has rivalries with Nōhime (regarding on those they protect) and Sasuke (as a ninja, and due to contradicting personalities). She uses eight kunai (four on each hand) tied with an invisible razor wire. Her familiar is an owl.

=== Oda Clan ===
Nobunaga Oda (織田 信長, Oda Nobunaga)

- Voiced by: Norio Wakamoto (Japanese); John Swasey (English)

Nobunaga is the ruler of the Oda clan and known as "The Demon King of Owari". He is ruthless and will stop at nothing until the world bows to his might. He wields a sword in one hand and a shotgun in the other. He is killed by Masamune and Yukimura at Azuchi Castle.
Nōhime (濃姫)

- Voiced by: Yurika Hino (Japanese); Stephanie Young (English)

Nōhime is the wife of Nobunaga, who doesn't care very much for her, but still very devoted, showing no mercy to her enemies. She wields two handguns and is able to unleash other types of guns such as a cannon, shotgun or Gatling gun. She is killed by Oichi, who uses her dark powers, in Azuchi Castle.
Mitsuhide Akechi (明智 光秀, Akechi Mitsuhide)

- Voiced by: Sho Hayami (Japanese); Vic Mignogna (English)

Mitsuhide is an Oda clan vassal who would eventually betray Nobunaga. He wields two scythes, depicted as a sadistic psychopath that enjoys the suffering of other people, possibly of a greater evil than Nobunaga himself. He is seemingly burned alive when he battled Kojūrō at Honnō-ji Temple. However, he survived and appears as a monk named Tenkai in Sengoku Basara: The Last Party.
Ranmaru Mori (森 蘭丸, Mori Ranmaru)

- Voiced by: Hiroki Shimowada (Japanese); Maxey Whitehead (English)

Ranmaru is a young soldier of the Oda clan. He eagerly desires recognition from his master and will fight tenaciously for him. He wields a bow and has assisted Nōhime and Mitsuhide when each of them attacked Kenshin and Kojūrō. After Mitsuhide died, Kojūrō lets Ranmaru live out his life, not being bound to the Oda clan anymore.

=== Azai Clan ===
Oichi (お市)

- Voiced by: Mamiko Noto (Japanese); Laura Bailey (English)

Oichi is the wife of Nagamasa and younger sister of Nobunaga. She is depicted as a depressed woman who worries about Nagamasa and the friction between him and Nobunaga. While considered innocent looking, she has a dark side which can become dangerous once she snaps. She wields a double bladed naginata, which she can separate and chainlink to its bar. Her story, considered to be the most tragic, revolves around her witnessing Nagamasa being killed by Mitsuhide at Shitaragahara and being forced to fight in Nobunaga's name, slowly losing her sanity due to the loss of her husband and her brother's ruthless methods. In the end, she succumbs to her own dark powers.
Nagamasa Azai (浅井長政, Azai Nagamasa)

- Voiced by: Kōji Tsujitani (Japanese); Christopher Bevins (English)

Nagamasa was a former ally of the Oda clan, but now breaking the alliance against them. He is a man fighting for justice and vows to stop anybody who wants to create evil, namely Nobunaga. He wields a long sword and a folding buckler. His fighting style and mannerism are similar to that of a typical superhero. He is also often seen telling Oichi to stop crying, only to shyly declare his love (sometimes with flowers). He is shot by Mitsuhide when Oichi goes to see him in the battlefield of Shitaragahara.

=== Tokugawa Clan ===
Ieyasu Tokugawa (徳川家康, Tokugawa Ieyasu)

- Voiced by: Toru Okawa (Japanese); Liam O'Brien (English)

Ieyasu is the leader of the Tokugawa clan. Although small, he makes it up with his trust in his generals as well as his control over his most powerful general, Tadakatsu. He wields a bladed staff. But later discards the staff, fighting with his fists when he gets older in the second season.
Tadakatsu Honda (本多忠勝, Honda Tadakatsu)
Tadakatsu is one of the greatest generals under Ieyasu. A giant mechanized robot clad in armor, possessing great strength in each of his blows. He cannot talk. He wields a huge drill-spear.

=== Maeda Clan ===
Keiji Maeda (前田慶次, Maeda Keiji)

- Voiced by: Masakazu Morita (Japanese); Eric Vale (English)

Keiji is the nephew of Toshiie, and he is a vagabond and known to be called a happy-go-lucky man. Despite his demeanor towards his step-family, he loves them though shows resentment at them due to their objection to his lifestyle. Accompanying him is a small monkey named Yumekichi. He was former friends with Hideyoshi until a tragic event happened, which was caused by Hisahide, broke their friendship. His weapon is a ludicrously over-sized nōdachi. Despite its length, he can use it one-handed. He also uses its sheath, but rather than carry it around he throws it into the sky, having it come down just when he needs to use it.
Matsu (まつ)

- Voiced by: Yuko Kaida (Japanese); Jamie Marchi (English)

Matsu is the wife of Toshiie and the aunt-in-law of Keiji. She is more responsible than her husband but loves him wholeheartedly. She and Toshiie sided with Hideyoshi for a short bit in the second season. She usually chases Keiji when he pulls pranks on her. She wields a naginata.
Toshiie Maeda (前田利家, Maeda Toshiie)

- Voiced by: Tomohiro Tsuboi (Japanese); Chuck Huber (English)

Toshiie is the husband of Matsu and the uncle of Keiji. He and Matsu sided with Hideyoshi for a short bit in the second season. He loves his wife Matsu dearly but he doesn't have much for brains and seems to be perpetually famished, often asking Matsu for more food. He wields a trident.

=== Toyotomi Clan ===
Hideyoshi Toyotomi (豊臣秀吉, Toyotomi Hideyoshi)

- Voiced by: Ryōtarō Okiayu (Japanese); Christopher Sabat (English)

Hideyoshi is the ruler of the Toyotomi clan. He is depicted as a giant man, whose ambition is to rule all of Japan and form it into a formidable, prospering nation, which causes him to declare the Oda clan as a source of the chaos that started in Japan. Even though he has good intentions, he is drunk with power and will use any means, no matter how ruthless, to achieve it (though he is still charismatic and caring to his subordinates, unlike Nobunaga). He was former friends with Keiji until a tragic event happened, which was caused by Hisahide, broke their friendship. With just his bare hands, he can destroy a squadron in seconds. His weapons are his fists, which can be strengthened with magical arm guards.
Hanbei Takenaka (竹中半兵衛, Takenaka Hanbei)

- Voiced by: Akira Ishida (Japanese); Chris Cason (English)

Hanbei is Hideyoshi's strategist. He is intelligent and extremely loyal to Hideyoshi. Around his enemies, he is narcissistic, cold and very cruel. Given the chance, he can wipe them all out by swinging his weapon. His favorite methods of assassination are back-stabbing his opponents at his weapon's reach and snaring his opponents when they are not looking. Despite his physique, he suffers from tuberculosis. His weapon is a whipsword.
Mitsunari Ishida (石田三成, Ishida Mitsunari)

- Voiced by: Tomokazu Seki (Japanese); Troy Baker (English)

Mitsunari is a vassal of Hideyoshi in the second season. He views Hideyoshi as a role-model and serves him with absolute loyalty. He wields a katana and attacks faster than the eye can see, often having his weapon sheathed again before the enemy knows what has hit them. In Sengoku Basara: The Last Party, he is fueled by rage and obsessed with a desire to take revenge on Masamune for killing Hideyoshi, caring very little for other concerns, personal or political.

=== Shimazu Clan ===
Yoshihiro Shimazu (島津義弘, Shimazu Yoshihiro)

- Voiced by: Kenichi Ogata (Japanese); R Bruce Elliott (English)

Yoshihiro is the leader of the Shimazu clan. Although old, he is a great warrior who is not to be underestimated. He is also known for his impeccable ambush parties. He uses a broad sword. He is seen being killed by Nobunaga in the first season, but in the second season he survived. He aids Yukimura in leading an assault on Motonari in Satsuma.
Musashi Miyamoto (宮本武蔵, Miyamoto Musashi)

- Voiced by: Daisuke Namikawa (Japanese); Sean Michael Teague (English)

Musashi claims to be a master swordsman, portrayed as a wild man itching for a fight to prove that he is the strongest man in Japan. He wields an Eku and a wooden sword. He plans on writing a novel of his journeys once the wars in Japan are over. During battle, he constantly taunts his opponent, usually calling them "baka" ("fool"). Yoshihiro is his mentor.

=== Other Clans ===
Yoshimoto Imagawa (今川義元, Imagawa Yoshimoto)

- Voiced by: Kozo Shioya (Japanese); Barry Yandell (English)

Yoshimoto is the leader of the Imagawa clan. He acts childish and cowardly but will fight when ultimately cornered. His lack of resolve costs his soldiers to lose heart multiple times while still in battle though his occasional bursts of courage would increase their morale, that is until the next time he panics again. He wields a giant fan. When Yukimura and Masamune prepare to attack him, he sends out decoys to escape. However, Nobunaga's operatives kill the decoys, and Yoshimoto is shot by Nobunaga himself.
Ujimasa Hōjō (北条 氏政, Hōjō Ujimasa)

- Voiced by: Tadashi Miyazawa (Japanese); Jerry Russell (English)

Ujimasa is the leader of the Hōjō clan. He is mostly known for his impressive fortress named Odawara Castle, and his defensive stance towards the brewing war. He uses a multi-bladed spear. He summons Kotarō to attack Shingen, but Shingen manages to defeat Kotarō and kill Ujimasa afterwards.
Kotarō Fūma (風魔小太郎, Fūma Kotarō)
Kotarō is a ninja who primary serves the Hōjō clan in the first season, but then serves Hisahide in the second season. His weapons are two ninja swords that he dual wields. He is depicted as a man who never talks, but takes action immediately. Like Kasuga and Sasuke, he can create duplicates of himself. Unlike Kasuga and Sasuke who need bird familiars to glide down, Kotarō can glide straightforward with just his body and can further glide when paired with his air attacks.
Hisahide Matsunaga (松永久秀, Matsunaga Hisahide)

- Voiced by: Keiji Fujiwara (Japanese); Kent Williams (English)

Hisahide is a very shrewd individual, being a manipulative, scheming man whose weapons are a sword and gunpowder. He is involved in various back stories, such as taking most of Masamune's retainers hostage and inciting Kojūrō's anger by humiliating Masamune. In another story, he humiliated and defeated Hideyoshi, causing him to be drunk on power and turned him from a sane man into a power-hungry ambitious man. He is the true cause of the chaos in Japan.
Motonari Mōri (毛利元就, Mōri Motonari)

- Voiced by: Shigeru Nakahara (Japanese); Sam Riegel (English)

Motonari is the leader of the Mōri clan. He is known for possessing a great tactical mind, but thinks very little of his subordinates and sees them as disposable pawns. He wields a ringblade, which he can separate to become twin blades. He has a habit of watching the sunset. He is depicted as the rival of Motochika. In the second season, he forms an alliance with Hideyoshi. He destroys the Fugaku, Motochika's fortress, and rebuilds and renames it the Nichirin. However, Yukimura manages to destroy the Nichirin with his full power, seemingly killing Motonari in the process. However, Motonari survives and appears in Sengoku Basara: The Last Party.
Motochika Chōsokabe (長宗我部元親, Chōsokabe Motochika)

- Voiced by: Ryuzo Ishino (Japanese); Patrick Seitz (English)

Motochika is the leader of the Chōsokabe clan. His fortress, the Fugaku, has a cannon which repels his opponents and several mechanical machines. He wields a long anchor-like spear that is equipped with a metal chain which he uses as his weapon and his mode of land transportation. Motochika appears within many variable conflicts as a supposed rival to Motonari. When Hideyoshi parts the sea, he destroys the Fugaku and easily defeats Motochika. However, after still surviving, he and Masamune joined forces to attack Hideyoshi in Odawara.

== Episode list ==
No. overall	No. in season	Title	Original release date
Season 1
1	1	"Azure and Crimson, A Fateful Encounter!"; Transliteration: "Sōkō Shukumei no Kaikō!" (Japanese: 蒼紅 宿命の邂逅!)	April 2, 2009
In the Sengoku Period of feudal Japan, many warlords from different clans fight in an endless struggle for power and unification of Japan. Shingen Takeda sends the hot-blooded Yukimura Sanada across the mountain pass to attack Kenshin Uesugi at night. However, Yukimura instead encounters the fierce "One-eyed Dragon of Oshu", Masamune Date, who is also after Kenshin. A rivalry starts when Masamune and Yukimura engage in an intense fight until Sasuke Sarutobi intervenes. Masamune and Yukimura return to their respective camps and withdraw from battle. The next day, when Shingen sets out to attack Yoshimoto Imagawa, Yukimura comes across Masamune in the battlefield, following him in pursuit.
2	2	"Horrific! Confrontation at Okehazama"; Transliteration: "Senritsu! Okehazama no Sōgū" (Japanese: 戦慄! 桶狭間の遭遇)	April 9, 2009
Masamune wants to defeat Yoshimoto, but Yukimura intervenes on him before that happens, fighting each other to decide who will capture Yoshimoto. Meanwhile, Shingen charges at Ujimasa Hōjō, trying to get him to surrender after Ujimasa attacked Shingen's army. However, Ujimasa sends Kotarō Fūma to distract and stall Shingen. When Kotarō is defeated, Shingen then easily takes out Ujimasa. During their fight, Masamune and Yukimura find out that Yoshimoto has escaped from the battlefield using two other decoys. However, all three are each attacked by operatives under the "Demon King of Owari", Nobunaga Oda. Masamune and Yukimura then witness Nobunaga shoot the real Yoshimoto.
3	3	"Vagabond, Maeda Keiji!"; Transliteration: "Fūraibō Maeda Keiji!" (Japanese: 風来坊 前田慶次!)	April 16, 2009
A carefree, wandering fellow named Keiji Maeda visits Kenshin, primarily discussing about forming an alliance in order to defeat Nobunaga. He then visits Masamune, who is not happy to meet him. Keiji tries to convince Masamune to form an alliance as well, but Masamune declines the request and wants to take on Nobunaga alone. As a result, Masamune ends up fighting Keiji, who tries to explain that forming an alliance against Nobunaga will give Japan peace and create a world of happiness. Nonetheless, Masamune manages to defeat Keiji. Still determined to stop Nobunaga, Masamune sets out to face the Oda clan head on.
4	4	"Wavering Scarlet Flower - Loyalty that Brings Sorrow!"; Transliteration: "Yureru Hi no Hana Hi o Yobu Shingi!" (Japanese: 揺れる緋の華 悲を呼ぶ信義!)	April 23, 2009
Nagamasa Azai hears word of what misdeeds Nobunaga, revealed to be his brother-in-law, is bringing across the country. Although he does not want to accept this fact, Nagamasa sets out to prevent Nobunaga from attacking his ally, the Asakura clan. Meanwhile, Kasuga visits Shingen, who plans to gather neighboring clans to support Keiji's cause to defeat the Oda clan. However, when Kasuga takes leave, Sasuke reports to Shingen his failure in persuading both the Azai and Tokugawa clans in forming an alliance with the Takeda clan. Meanwhile, Nobunaga says that he will not annihilate the Asakura clan, but instead Nagamasa must agree to annihilate them instead, lest his wife, Oichi, will suffer death. Mitsuhide Akechi warns Nagamasa that Masamune is planning to attack Nobunaga alone, so Nagamasa must prevent that from happening. The Takeda and Uesugi clans ally themselves and prepare for their attack on the Oda clan as well.
5	5	"Brutal! The Righteous Battle of Nagashino and Shitaragahara!"; Transliteration: "Sōzetsu! Nagashino-Shitaragahara no Gisen" (Japanese: 壮絶! 長篠・設楽原の義戦)	April 30, 2009
Shingen tries to persuade Ieyasu Tokugawa into joining his side, but the latter stands firm in allying with Nobunaga. As the Tokugawa clan advances on the Takeda and Uesugi clans, it seems that the Tokugawa clan is at a disadvantage, that is until Ieyasu summons his greatest general Tadakatsu Honda, a giant, mechanized robot wielding a large drill as a weapon, to quickly turn the tide of the battle. Yukimura, Sasuke, and Shingen do their best to fight Tadakatsu all at once. Elsewhere, Nagamasa intercepts Masamune to stop him from getting to Nobunaga. Kenshin catches up to Keiji and realizes his plan all along to ally the other leaders to confront Nobunaga by himself. Meanwhile, when Nobunaga leaves, Mitsuhide allows Oichi to see Nagamasa on the battlefield. However, this was a distraction for Mitsuhide to shoot Nagamasa point blank.
6	6	"Bonds Torn Asunder - Mortifying Retreat for Masamune!"; Transliteration: "Sakareta Kizuna Masamune Kutsujoku no Taikyaku!" (Japanese: 裂かれた絆 政宗屈辱の退却!)	May 7, 2009
As Nagamasa is dying in Oichi's arms, Mitsuhide reveals that Oichi's objective was to seduce the Azai clan to weaken their military power, but because she fell in love with Nagamasa, she was unable to accomplish any of her given orders. Nagamasa, before dying, forgives Oichi for her deception. With Nagamasa now dead, a furious Masamune, against the advice of Kojūrō Katakura, starts a battle with Mitsuhide. Ieyasu calls out a retreat because Nobunaga has betrayed him. Nōhime, revealed to be Nobunaga's wife, appears and sets her sights on Tadakatsu, killing him with an underground bomb. Masamune also decides to retreat to avoid being annihilated by Mitsuhide's firearms. After the death of Tadakatsu, Ieyasu agrees to join the alliance against Nobunaga. Yukimura offers Masamune to stay at Kai instead of going all the way back to Oshu. Kojūrō, surprised that Masamune was injured during the gun volley, gives treatment for his wounds.
7	7	"Marauding Villain! Two Dragons Duel in Earnest Under the Moon!"; Transliteration: "Ryakudatsu no Kyōyū! Sōryū Gekka no Shinken Shōbu" (Japanese: 略奪の梟雄! 双竜月下の真剣勝負)	May 14, 2009
After a teasing Sasuke warns an annoyed Kasuga not to stray away from Uesugi, Sasauke leaves to investigate a nearby explosion. Kojūrō tells Yukimura of his regrets of what happened to Masamune when Mitsuhide attacked him. Sasuke then arrives to report that some of Masamune's retainers were taken hostage by a shrewd man named Hisahide Matsunaga, who demands to possess Masamune's six dragon claw swords and Takeda's shieldless armor in exchange for their lives. While Kojūrō suggests to sacrifice the retainers and ignore this threat, Masamune, who just woke up and heard everything, wants to save his retainers instead. Kojūrō challenges Masamune to a battle, already knowing he is in no condition to fight, yet the latter accepts. Kojūrō ends the bout by promptly knocking him out after hitting him square on his wounds. Even so, Kojūrō decides to bring back the retainers safely in honor of Masamune's wish. Takeda questions why Yukimura would let Kojūrō go alone, and after making Yukimura to see the error of his ways, Takeda orders him to aid the rescue and bring the armor back for sure.
8	8	"Great Temple of Carnage! Kojūrō's in Dire Straits!"; Transliteration: "Keppū Daigaran! Kojūrō Zettaizetsumei" (Japanese: 血風大伽藍! 小十郎絶体絶命)	May 21, 2009
When Kojūrō arrives at Todaiji, the Miyoshi Death Squad blocks his path, using a special incense which works as slow acting poison. With his strength reduced, Kojūrō has a hard time fending off his enemies, but he overcomes with quick thinking, skill, and sheer willpower. At a temple ruin nearby, Kojūrō is met by Hisahide, who is shocked that he brought Masamune's six swords to save Masamune's retainers. Kojūrō hands over the six swords while challenging Hisahide to a duel, but the latter refuses. Yukimura soon arrives and hands over the shieldless armor, using this as a distraction for Sasuke to sneak past and attempt to free the retainers. However, Hisahide destroys the temple ruins before letting that happen. Meanwhile, in Kai, Masamune awakens to see Takeda, who speculates that Hisahide may be working under Oda but uncertain as to why that may be. As an enraged Kojūrō still has the strength to fight, despite being weakened by the poisoned incense, Hisahide dispatches his bomb squad. Yukimura tries to help fight them off, but to no avail. After Sasuke fumigates the incense, Kojūrō manages to land a fatal hit on Hisahide. In dishonor of himself, Hisahide blows himself up. Kojūrō is relieved to find that the retainers somehow survived the earlier explosion.
9	9	"The Tiger of Kai Dies at Midaigawa!"; Transliteration: "Kai no Tora, Midaigawa ni Shisu!" (Japanese: 甲斐の虎、御勅使川に死す!)	May 28, 2009
Oda advances from Kyushu to the north, killing Yoshihiro Shimazu among other forces along the way. Masamune and Kojūrō are on equal terms now, while Takeda gifts Yukimura with a new spear. Sasuke soon informs that Tokugawa was assassinated by Mitsuhide, which means that Oda's vassals will soon be approaching them. Meanwhile, Uesugi and Kasuga are interrupted by a female shinobi claiming be working under Sasuke. However, after the shinobi shoots at Uesugi, he quickly realizes that she is Nōhime, sent to kill him as she reveals herself. When Kasuga attempts to shield him, he moves her aside and takes bullets into his body shot by Nōhime. Back in Kai, a thunderstorm is causing the dike to break due to an overflow of the river. When Takeda starts to repair the dike, Mitsuhide shows up during this time, being sent to kill Takeda. Mitsuhide destroys the dike, causing water to spew and flood the area. Mitsuhide jabs Takeda with his scythe, causing the latter to fall into the river.
10	10	"Yukimura Beyond Recovery?! The Date Army's Tearful Disbandment!"; Transliteration: "Yukimura Saikifunō!? Date Gun Namida no Kaisan!!" (Japanese: 幸村再起不能!? 伊達軍涙の解散!!)	June 4, 2009
Masamune and Kojūrō, both infuriated, attack Mitsuhide, but they are dismayed when he gets away. After Kasuga tells Sasuke that she deeply blames herself for letting Uesugi get wounded, she then makes up her mind to assassinate Oda by herself. Sasuke, first disagreeing with her decision, relents and hands her a small wooden whistle in case of emergency. Yukimura, washed up ashore, is distressed when he is unable to save Takeda. In Owari, Mitsuhide proposes to Oda a plan to wipe out the remaining factions by allocating an army under his command. After settling an comatose Takeda in the room of the shieldless armor, Masamune and Kojūrō discuss with Sasuke their next move against Oda. However, after Kojūrō figures out how the brutal Mitsuhide would advance his army, Masamune sees this as an opportunity to attack Oda straight on. On the other hand, Yukimura is still in shock, both confused and afraid. On his way out alone, Masamune disbands his army, which surprises Yukimura. After Kojūrō explains why Masamune has chosen this course of action, this encourages Yukimura to realize his reason to fight. Yukimura and Masamune ride out to find the enemy at Honnoji.
11	11	"Mitsuhide's Betrayal! Honnoji Temple Goes Up in Flames!"; Transliteration: "Mitsuhide no Muhon! Honnō-ji Daienjō!!" (Japanese: 光秀の謀反! 本能寺大炎上!!)	June 11, 2009
In Honnoji, Mitsuhide's ulterior motive was to betray Oda and have his soldiers to be defeated. In Kai, Kojūrō gathers up all of the previously fallen factions in an attempt to support Yukimura and Masamune in battle to stop Oda once and for all. When the two make it to Honnoji, Yukimura and Masamune are surprised that Oda is nowhere to be found past the gates. This was actually a trap set by Nōhime to lure Mitsuhide's soldiers to their deaths. Inside the temple, Mitsuhide attacks Yukimura and Masamune, setting the building on fire. At Azuchi Castle, Oichi is compelled by Nōhime to kill Kasuga, who has been captured. However, Kasuga frees herself and escapes, taking Oichi with her. After parting ways, Kasuga blows her whistle, transforming it into a hang glider, to evade the area when met by ninjas. Ranmaru Mori shows up to aid Mitsuhide, only to be easily defeated by Masamune. After Kojūrō intervenes to tell Yukimura and Masamune to go to Azuchi Castle, he volunteers to fight Mitsuhide in their place. Facing Nōhime one more time, Oichi wishes to see her brother again. After Nōhime disallows her request, Nōhime fires her gun at Oichi.
12	12	"Azuchi Castle Keep - A Fight to the Death for Tomorrow"; Transliteration: "Azuchi-jō Tenshu Asu o Kaketa Shitō!!" (Japanese: 安土城天守 明日を懸けた死闘!!)	June 18, 2009
While Yukimura and Masamune lead the factions toward Azuchi Castle, Kojūrō continues his battle against Mitsuhide inside the burning temple. Although Mitsuhide uses Ranmaru as collateral, Kojūrō manages to defeat him, leaving Mitsuhide to suffer death in flames and allowing Ranmaru to live on freely. Inside the castle, when Nōhime prepares to shoot Oichi, the latter unwittingly neutralizes Nōhime with her dark powers. When Yukimura and Masamune reach the gates to the castle, their allies Motonari Mōri and Motochika Chōsokabe arrive on their ships and destroy the castle walls. Oichi, having an uneasy resolve to kill Oda, is mercilessly shot by him for her hesitation, just as Yukimura and Masamune finally make it to the castle to attack Oda. As Oda smites Masamune to the point of crucial pain and injury, Tadakatsu flies in to face Oda alone, but ends up being killed as well. Yukimura and Masamune face Oda one last time and attack with every ounce of their power, successfully defeating him and demolishing the castle. After the battle, each clan returns to their original state of battling against each other.
13	OVA–1	"Clash in the Inland Sea of Seto! Fugaku, the Great Fire-Belching Fortress of the Sea!"; Transliteration: "Setouchi no Gekitotsu! Hi o Fuku Umi no Daiyōsai-Fugaku!!" (Japanese: 瀬戸内の激突! 火を噴く海の大要塞・富嶽!!)	January 6, 2010
This takes place before Yukimura and Masamune led the factions to Azuchi Castle. Motochika meets with Toshiie Maeda and Matsu Maeda, who, both serving Oda as their lord, deliver a message to seed Sanuki and Eao. In response, Motochika tries to convince them to join his side instead. Keiji, who is currently imprisoned in Aki at Itsukushima, is approached by Motonari. Keiji, after mentioning to Motonari that Motochika is equipped with a powerful ship called the Fugaku, convinces Motonari to arrange a hostage exchange with Motochika to negotiate an alliance against Oda. Motochika lets Toshiie and Matsu know of this plan, suggesting they should find their resolve in whom really to support. During the negotiation at sea, Motonari tricks Motochika and takes over the Fugaku. In anger and disbelief, Keiji then breaks free from the ropes and attacks Motonari, but he is hit by an arrow and falls into the sea. This leads Motochika and Motonari to engage in a fierce battle against each other. However, Keiji survived from drowning, persuading them to stop fighting. As Kasuga arrives, it is implied the assault on Azuchi Castle just began. Motochika and Motonari, along with the others on board, head towards Azuchi Castle to join the fight against Oda.
Season 2
14	1	"Troubled Times Once Again! Advent of the Great Cataclysmic Warlord, Toyotomi Hideyoshi!"; Transliteration: "Ransei Futatabi! Rekkai Butei-Toyotomi Hideyoshi Kōrin!" (Japanese: 乱世再び! 裂界武帝・豊臣秀吉降臨!)	July 11, 2010
The surviving warlords continue to fight against each other at Kawanakajima. However, they all find themselves surrounded by soldiers of Hideyoshi Toyotomi, who easily repels the arrows shot at him. Masamune Date takes Hideyoshi head on, while Kojūrō Katakura faces Hideyoshi's strategist Hanbei Takenaka. However, as Hideyoshi and Hanbei prove to be strong, all factions are forced to retreat. Keiji Maeda, who was aware that Hideyoshi was there, is frustrated when he arrived at the scene too late. Keiji later visits Toshiie Maeda and Matsu Maeda, who both agree with Hideyoshi's resolve to unite the clans together to help grow into a strong country. When Toshiie and Matsu request Keiji to join them, due to their history with Hideyoshi as former friends, Keiji refuses and leaves. Sasuke Sarutobi reports to Shingen Takeda that Hideyoshi not only has secretly invaded and taken over Utsunomiya and Odawara, he also has allied himself with Motonari Mōri. Takeda tells Yukimura Sanada to head west to Satsuma in Kyushu to prepare an attack on Hideyoshi and Motonari from there. In Oshu, after Kojūrō hears news about Hideyoshi's activities, he is confronted by Hanbei, who takes two villagers as hostages as a bargain to force him to join Hideyoshi's army.
15	2	"The Lost Right Eye... The Dragon's Back Rent Asunder!"; Transliteration: "Ushinawareta Migi Me Kirisakareta Ryū no Senaka!" (Japanese: 失われた右目 斬り裂かれた竜の背中!)	July 18, 2010
Kojūrō, refusing Hanbei's offer to join Hideyoshi's army, attacks Hanbei while protecting the hostages, only to be beaten up and knocked unconscious. Masamune's retainers not only report of an assault Nambu, Tsugara and Soma, but also inform that Kojūrō has been captured, leaving behind his sword. Keiji visits Kenshin Uesugi, discussing that Hideyoshi and Motonari may be heading towards Shikoku for their next attack. However, Keiji is shocked when Kasuga says that Toshiie and Matsu's army is approaching Echigo to fight against Uesugi's army. In Oshu, Masamune manages to defeat most of the soldiers from the three assaults. Masamune confronts Hanbei at the battlefield, but after Hanbei hits Masamune with his sword, he retreats when more of Hideyoshi's soldiers arrive, leaving Masamune at a disadvantage. Hanbei returns to Osaka Castle and meets with Hideyoshi to discuss with the plan and departs to Aki to complete the alliance with Motonari.
16	3	"Keiji vs. Toshiie! Tedorigawa Choked with Unequivocal Ideals!"; Transliteration: "Keiji Tai Toshiie! Tetorigawa ni Musebu Yuzurenu Omoi!" (Japanese: 慶次対利家! 手取川に咽ぶゆずれぬ想い!)	July 25, 2010
Keiji tries to stop Toshiie and Matsu from going to Echigo, but the two goes past him. Toshiie and Matsu meets with Uesugi, who reveals that a large portion of his army is heading towards Kaga, forcing Toshiie to decide between defeating Uesugi and claim control of Echigo or returning to Kaga and protect his people. Toshiie chooses to return to Kaga on behalf of Matsu's safety, but when going back, they are surrounded by Uesugi's army at Tetorigawa. When Keiji catches up to the two, he confronts Toshiie in full force, questioning his motives for siding with Hideyoshi. After Keiji defeats Toshiie, Matsu draws her sword at Keiji. Uesugi, who has witnessed this fight, tells Matsu to withdraw from fighting, acknowledging that both Keiji and Toshiie strive for peace but for different reasons. In Oshu, after fighting off and surviving against Hideyoshi's army, Masamune now faces Hideyoshi himself. While Yukimura travels west towards Satsuma with his new ally Nobushige Oyamada, he hears a faint cry coming from Azuchi Castle.
17	4	"The Ghost of Azuchi Castle?! The Lamentation and Howl of Evil that Assail Yukimura!"; Transliteration: "Azuchi-jō no Bōrei!? Yukimura o Osou Nageki to Ma no Hōkō!" (Japanese: 安土城の亡霊!? 幸村を襲う嘆きと魔の咆哮!)	August 1, 2010
Yukimura goes inside the crumbled Azuchi Castle, shocked to find Hisahide Matsunaga still alive, who tells him that the ghost of Oichi is crying because she is stuck between the realms of life and death. Hisahide, holding the skull of the now dead Nobunaga Oda, plans to take this with him by means of karma, since Oda used to drink from the skull of the generals he has murdered. Hisahide then tells Yukimura that Masamune has been defeated by Hideyoshi, though Yukimura does not believe this. Hisahide summons Kotarō Fūma, who later sets off explosives in the area, allowing Hisahide to escape with the skull. Yukimura, who survived the blast, is then approached by Oichi, who nearly consumes him with her dark powers. After managing to break free, he attacks the dark spirit of Oda, who has possessed her. Masamune, covered in bandages, awakes in his home and thanks his retainers, who all protected him from Hideyoshi even though they lost the battle. Hideyoshi, who fled from the battle, recalls to when Keiji had protected him the same way long ago. The next morning, relieved that Oichi has finally overcome her dark powers, Yukimura encounters remnants of Oda's forces, who has come to retrieve Oichi and rebuild the clan. Oyamada arrives to get Yukimura, preventing the remnants from attacking him. In Aki, Hanbei and Motonari have completed their alliance and are planning to launch an attack on Motochika Chōsokabe in Shikoku.
18	5	"Engraved Pledge! The One-Eyed Dragon vs. the War God... Confrontation at Hitotoribashi!"; Transliteration: "Seigan no Kokuin! Dokuganryū Tai Gunshin Hitotoribashi no Taiji!" (Japanese: 誓願の刻印! 独眼竜対軍神 人取橋の対峙!)	August 8, 2010
After returning to Oshu, Masamune prevents the dishonored Kojūrō from committing seppuku, punching him with his injured hand. Masamune will use Kojūrō's sword as a substitute for losing one of his six swords in the previous battle. Masamune's forces then head towards Setouchi were Uesugi's forces reside. In Osaka, Hanbei meets with Kojūrō and deceives him of Masamune's defeat, showing him Masamune's lost sword as proof. Arriving at Osaka, Keiji sees Hideyoshi's forces leaving for Shikoku, but Hanbei stops him and reminds him of what happened in Tetorigawa. While traveling to Satsuma at night, Yukimura, contemplating that much of the men in each family of the villagers has gone to war, spots Hideyoshi's forces heading towards Shikoku. In Setouchi, Uesugi sends back his army, much to the surprise of Masamune. As they meet at the bridge, Masamune thanks Uesugi for allowing him to advance to Satsuma. In Shikoku, both Motochika and Motonari has begun their battle at sea.
19	6	"The Menacing Toyotomi-Mori Alliance! The Powerful Fist of Supremacy Cleaves the Sea!!"; Transliteration: "Kyōi no Toyotomi-Mōri Dōmei! Unabara o Saku Ha no Gōken!!" (Japanese: 脅威の豊臣・毛利同盟! 海原を裂く覇の豪拳!!)	August 15, 2010
Aboard the Fugaku, Motochika are aware that many villagers were driven out of their land in Shikoku, so he let them know that he will defeat Motonari in no time. In Kaga, Keiji visits Toshiie and Matsu, who reveal that Hideyoshi now wants them to attack Kai. Although they must adhere to this, Toshiie and Matsu both understand what Keiji is seeking for to acquire peace. In Shikoku, Motochika has gained the upper hand, but Motonari plans to lure him to allow Hideyoshi to attack him. When Hideyoshi appears, he parts the sea with his fist, immobilizing Motochika on the dry surface. In fact, he also blocks a cannonball shot by Motochika with only one hand. Hideyoshi jumps onto the Fugaku and confronts Motochika head on, easily beating him up. Yukimura and Oyamada, with Sasuke tagging along, have witnessed this battle, planning to support Motochika's forces. While trying to clear a path for Yukimura, Oyamada is consequently killed in the process. During the duel between Motochika and Hideyoshi, the Fugaku is ultimately destroyed. As Motochika has fallen to his defeat, Hideyoshi has his victory secured.
20	7	"To the Southernmost Land of Satsuma! A New Encounter as a Man for Yukimura!!"; Transliteration: "Sainantan-Satsuma no Chi e! Yukimura, Aratanaru Otoko no Deai!" (Japanese: 最南端・薩摩の地へ! 幸村、新たなる漢の出逢い!!)	August 22, 2010
Sasuke informs Takeda that Oyamada was killed in battle. He also reports to Takeda that Masamune is attacking Hideyoshi's forces disguised as Takeda's soldiers. After Sasuke lets Masamune know this, both Takeda and Masamune are then able to defeat Hideyoshi's forces. Still on the way to Satsuma, Yukimura comes across men from the area, only for him to be led to and fend against Musashi Miyamoto, an untrained swordsman from the village of Satsuma. After a brief fight, Yukimura orders Musashi to bring him to see the leader. Upon meeting the leader, Yoshihiro Shimazu, Yukimura is surprised that he is still alive, since it was known that he was supposedly killed by Oda. In Kai, Takeda and Masamune that Hideyoshi would face them both if the two form an alliance and attack him. However, Masamune refuses to do so and wants to fight Hideyoshi alone in Osaka. Meanwhile, in Osaka, while Hideyoshi and Hanbei discuss about their next plan and the arrival of a new weapon, Keiji arrives and demands to speak with Hideyoshi.
21	8	"A Sad Reunion with a Friend... Memory of the Day Etched with Blinding Obsession!"; Transliteration: "Tomogaki to no Kanashiki Saikai Mōshū Kizamareshi Hi no Kioku!" (Japanese: 友垣との哀しき再会 猛執刻まれし日の記憶!)	August 29, 2010
Hideyoshi grants Keiji's request of having the alliance between the Maede and Toyotomi clans dissolved. However, after Keiji asks why Hideyoshi killed Nene, a girl whom he first loved, Hideyoshi says he had to let her go in order to strengthen the country. Of course, Keiji and Hideyoshi disagree with what is best for the country, so Hideyoshi tells Keiji to leave. In Satsuma, Yukimura meets with Shimazu and discusses a possible alliance with him. Seeing Yukimura's determination to take down Hideyoshi, Shimazu accepts the offer. Later while on the beach, after Musashi cooks fish for them, Shimazu explains that his former ally Motonari was the one who had manipulated Oda in the past to attack Kyushu before heading to Setouchi. In Osaka, Keiji is surprised when his pet baby monkey Yumekichi suddenly falls ill, then he also crosses paths with Hisahide, who does not recognize him, at the same time. Keiji remembers that Hisahide is the one who had beaten Hideyoshi up long ago. Keiji had tried to save him, only to be beaten up himself, all before Hisahide leaves. After the two had come across a group of monks of Honganji, Hideyoshi, feeling angry for being weak, unleashed his fury on the monks. Hisahide meets with Hideyoshi, also whom he does not recognize, and Hanbei tells Hisahide to stop Masamune's forces in Owari. Meanwhile, in Owari, as Masamune enters the territory, he is approached by Motochika, revealed to still be alive.
22	9	"Dragon and Ogre... Clash and Roar in Owari! The Combined Forces of Date and Chosokabe!!"; Transliteration: "Ryū to Oni Owari no Gekitotsu! Bakusō! Date-Chōsokabe Rengō Gun!!" (Japanese: 竜と鬼 尾張の激突! 爆走! 伊達・長曾我部連合軍!!)	September 5, 2010
Masamune and Motochika confront each other, with both of their forces watching, but it ends in a draw. In Aki, Motonari and his general Motoyasu Akagawa are witnessing that the Fugaku is being rebuilt and being renamed the Nichirin. In Satsuma, after Yukimura and Musashi train by unusual means, Hideyoshi's forces soon arrive to face Yukimura and Musashi's forces. However, Motonari's forces will soon appear as well. In Osaka, Hideyoshi and Hanbei begin their next plan to conquer the east, already aware that Motonari has deceived them. Later, Kasuga delivers a message to Keiji that Toshiie will be joining Uesugi to defend Echigo from Hideyoshi, aside from the fact that Toshiie is in no condition to fight. During this time, Yumekichi disappears with Keiji's pendant. As both Masamune and Motochika's forces discuss their plan to attack Wasaka and Yamashiro, a throwing dart appeared with a note on it, and as Masamune reads it, he recognizes that it was written by Hisahide.
23	10	"The Young Tiger Restored! The Great Fortress Rebuilt... The Menace of the Sun Heads East!!"; Transliteration: "Fukkatsu no Wakaki Tora! Kaizō Daiyōsai-Nichirin no Kyōi, Higashi e!!" (Japanese: 復活の若き虎! 改造大要塞・日輪の脅威､東へ!!)	September 12, 2010
Motochika decides to accompany Masamune in the search for Hisahide. In Satsuma, as both Yukimura and Musashi has begun an assault on Hideyoshi, they are confronted by Motonari. Meanwhile, after jumping across the canyon filled with explosives, Masamune and Motochika have fallen into Hisahide's trap. While looking for his pendant, Keiji is informed by Kasuga that Hideyoshi is heading towards Odawara, so Keiji decides to leave Yumekichi to Kasuga. In Satsuma, after the enemy forces retreat, Yukimura feels guilty for the people he struck down, but Shimazu encourages him to remember that they are fighting for their desire for peace. Shimazu sends Yukimura with some of his men to track Motonari, bidding him farewell. In Osaka, Hideyoshi is aware that Hanbei has succumb to his gradual illness, telling him to rest. Nearby, Masamune and Motochika, having survived the blasts, witness Hideyoshi's forces leaving for Odawara.
24	11	"Toyotomi's Great Main Army Dashes for Supremacy! Earnest Keiji Draws Sword in Heartbreak!!"; Transliteration: "Hasō Toyotomi Daihontai! Honki no Keiji, Danchō no Battō!!" (Japanese: 覇走豊臣大本隊! 本気の慶次、断腸の抜刀!!)	September 19, 2010
Kojūrō still refuses to adhere to Hanbei and serve Hideyoshi. After Hanbei leaves, Kotarō discreetly takes out the guards inside the castle. Sasuke and Kasuga infiltrate from the outside and discover Kojūrō there. In the command center, the three realize that Hideyoshi is planning to attack Uesugi and Satsuma. As soon as Sasuke is about to hand Kojūrō a sword in the room, Kotarō suddenly appears and attacks Sasuke, actually sent to retrieve that sword back to Hisahide before disappearing. Kasuga heads back to Uesugi on a hang glider, while Kojūrō releases prisoners held captive inside the dungeon and leads a revolt. Kojūrō reunites with Masamune, who parts ways with Motochika and heads to Odawara to go after Hideyoshi. In Satsuma, as Motonari heads for battle in the Nichirin, he kills Akagawa, knowing he was a spy under Hanbei. Motonari fires the cannon at some of Hanbei's scouts at sea, and Yukimura witnesses its power at a distance. As Hideyoshi leads his forces to Odawara, Keiji tries to stop him, but Hideyoshi is rammed up and his sword is trampled on. As he lies on the ground, he is met by Masamune, who acknowledges his views of peace before leaving. As Yukimura makes his way to Satsuma, he lets Sasuke know that he does not need any of Takeda's forces from Kai as backup. As Hanbei hears news about his scouts being wiped out by Motonari in Satsuma, Masamune confronts Hideyoshi in Odawara.
25	12	"Azure and Crimson Do-or-Die Battle! To the Sound of the Breeze at the End of the Fierce Struggle!!"; Transliteration: "Sōkō Kesshisen! Gekitō no Hate ni Fuku Kaze no Oto yo!!" (Japanese: 蒼紅決死戦! 激闘の果てに吹く風の音よ!!)	September 26, 2010
Masamune and Hideyoshi start their battle, Yukimura begins his assault on Motonari, and Kojūrō prepares to fight Hanbei. In Echigo, Uesugi, defeating much of Hideyoshi's forces there, encounters Mitsunari Ishida, one of Hideyoshi's general, with Kasuga finally arriving back. In Satsuma, Shimazu and Musashi takes out most of Hideyoshi's forces there, who have been surprisingly led by Ieyasu Tokugawa with Tadakatsu Honda. Yukimura manages to stop Motonari from running over a village using his spears against the Nichirin. When Yukimura tries to fight Motonari, the latter tries to trap him on one of the mirrors to burn him alive from the solar lights. However, as Yukimura breaks free and unleashes his full power, he destroys the Nichirin, catching Motonari in the blast. Kojūrō uses Masamune's damaged sword against Hanbei, who succumbs to his illness and falls over the edge of the cliff. Hideyoshi, who has the upper hand against Masamune, crushes the castle on top of him. Masamune, managing to survive, defeats Hideyoshi using Kojūrō's sword in full force. Keiji meets with Hideyoshi and Hanbei in a trance state, and Hideyoshi tells Keiji his name will not last forever, even in the desire of creating a strong nation. Hideyoshi returns the pendant back to Keiji, knowing that he is no longer worthy of wearing it anymore. With Hideyoshi's defeat, all of his armies scatter and return to their families, and everyone else return to their normal lives.
26	OVA–2	"Dragon and Tiger... Oath of Victory! Souls Racing Towards a Blazing Future!!"; Transliteration: "Ryūko, Itadaki no Chikai! Atsuki Mirai e Kakeru Tamashii!!" (Japanese: 竜虎、頂の誓い! 熱き未来へ駆ける魂!!)	April 6, 2011
Takeda invites Yukimura and Masamune to participate in the "Takeda Contest of Men". In this episode, Kojūrō, Sasuke and Takeda wear masks to hide their identity until defeated. As Yukimura faces Kojūrō, Yukimura drops his spear and attempts to punch Kojūrō with his injured hand, catching Kojūrō off guard for a moment. Kojūrō returns the spear back to Yukimura, having pity on him. As Masamune fights Sasuke, the latter duplicates and multiplies the former's form to surround him. Kojūrō butts in and stops the fight. As Yukimura and Masamune advance further into the contest, they enter a chamber where they meet Takeda. Masamune fights Takeda to the bitter end, splitting his mask in two. After Masamune leaves the chamber, Yukimura feels disgraced that Masamune bested Takeda. However, Takeda encourages Yukimura, through means of punches, not to give up, for he is worthy as a "man". When Yukimura goes outside to see Masamune off, they shake hands, promising each other for one final fight someday soon.
