= Sengoku Basara 4 =

2014 video game

Sengoku BASARA 4
- Developer: Capcom
- Publisher: Capcom
- Director: Makoto Yamamoto
- Producer: Akihito Kadowaki
- Designer: Tomonori Iida
- Programmer: Shinya Shigeyoshi
- Writers: Izuru Matsuno; Kosuke Nasu; Yosuke Miyagi
- Composers: Masahiro Aoki; Hiromitsu Maeba; Azusa Kato
- Series: Sengoku BASARA
- Engine: MT Framework
- Platforms: PlayStation 3, PlayStation 4
- Release: Sengoku BASARA 4 (PS3): JP: January 23, 2014; Sengoku BASARA 4 Sumeragi (PS3, PS4): JP: July 23, 2015; Sengoku BASARA 4 Sumeragi Anniversary Edition (PS4): JP: July 21, 2020
- Genre: Hack and Slash
- Modes: Single-player, multiplayer

Sengoku BASARA 4 (戦国BASARA４) is the fourth main installment of the Sengoku BASARA video game series, developed and published by Capcom for the PlayStation 3. The game was released in Japan on January 23, 2014.

An expanded version of the game for the PlayStation 3 and PlayStation 4 titled Sengoku BASARA 4 Sumeragi was released in Japan on July 23, 2015. A further re-release for the PlayStation 4, titled Sengoku BASARA 4 Sumeragi Anniversary Edition, was released in Japan on July 21, 2020, to mark the series' 15th anniversary. It bundles the expanded game with 66 pieces of downloadable content, and its physical version includes a special art box and an 80-page booklet, Sengoku Heroes 15th Anniversary Records, which collects artwork and interviews from the series' history.

== Characters ==
This shows all the characters that are playable in the main game and its expanded version, Sengoku Basara 4 Sumeragi, bringing the overall roster to 40.
Bold denotes characters that were NPCs in the main game, but were made playable in the expanded version, Sengoku Basara 4 Sumeragi.
Sen no Rikyū (*) made his first appearance in Sengoku Basara 4 Sumeragi.

=== Cast ===
New

- Ashikaga Yoshiteru: Shūichi Ikeda
- Gotō Matabei: Shin-ichiro Miki
- Ii Naotora: Maaya Sakamoto
- Kyōgoku Maria: Miyuki Sawashiro
- Sen no Rikyū* : Takahiro Sakurai
- Shibata Katsuie: Nobuhiko Okamoto
- Shima Sakon: Yūichi Nakamura
- Yamanaka Shikanosuke: Miyu Irino

Returning

- Azai Nagamasa: Kōji Tsujitani
- Chōsokabe Motochika: Ryuzou Ishino
- Date Masamune: Kazuya Nakai
- Fūma Kotarō
- Honda Tadakatsu
- Ishida Mitsunari: Tomokazu Seki
- Kasuga: Natsuko Kuwatani
- Katakura Kojūrō: Toshiyuki Morikawa
- Kobayakawa Hideaki: Jun Fukuyama
- Kuroda Kanbei: Rikiya Koyama
- Maeda Keiji: Masakazu Morita
- Maeda Toshiie: Tomohiro Tsuboi
- Matsu: Yūko Kaida
- Matsunaga Hisahide: Keiji Fujiwara
- Mogami Yoshiaki: Tetsu Shiratori
- Mōri Motonari: Shigeru Nakahara
- Oda Nobunaga: Norio Wakamoto
- Oichi: Mamiko Noto
- Ōtani Yoshitsugu: Fumihiko Tachiki
- Ōtomo Sōrin: Noriaki Sugiyama
- Saika Magoichi: Sayaka Ohara
- Sanada Yukimura: Sōichirō Hoshi
- Sarutobi Sasuke: Takehito Koyasu
- Shimazu Yoshihiro: Kenichi Ogata
- Tachibana Muneshige: Tetsu Inada
- Takeda Shingen: Tesshō Genda
- Takenaka Hanbei: Akira Ishida
- Tenkai (Akechi Mitsuhide in disguise): Show Hayami
- Tokugawa Ieyasu: Tōru Ōkawa
- Toyotomi Hideyoshi: Ryōtarō Okiayu
- Tsuruhime: Ami Koshimizu
- Uesugi Kenshin: Romi Park

== Development ==
Following the release of Sengoku BASARA 3, Capcom conducted several internal discussions regarding the direction of the next main installment. Capcom stated that, "In the summer of 2010, Hiroyuki Kobayashi, Makoto Yamamoto, and the Sengoku BASARA Development Team had poured their all into Sengoku BASARA 3, which captured the hearts of many and became a hit, selling over 500,000 units. Consequently, there were huge expectations for Sengoku BASARA 4, which now boasted a development structure over three times larger than that of the original." Development for the game began on February 14, 2012.

In an interview with Hiroyuki Kobayashi, he said that, "The team working on the Sengoku BASARA series is very small but they just about get by." He also talked about historical settings in games and the continuing appeal they seem to have for the Japanese audience. Kobayashi also remarked on the many subtle nods to real-life history which crop up throughout the series.

== Gameplay ==
Sengoku BASARA 4 is a hack and slash, action game. Players choose characters from a diverse roster to face out against entire battlefields of enemies with their allies. The gameplay is accessible enough so that any player can jump into the action, but rewards players for mixing up their combos by offering them more gold or power. This installment introduces new mechanics to the series while retaining older mechanics from previous games. The new story mode is titled as, "Sengoku Creation", and is the main gameplay mode of the game, this is where character's stories take place over a series of battles. In appearance, this mode seems to be a fusion of the modes, "Story" and "Unification", from Sengoku BASARA 3 Utage.

=== Universal mechanics ===
Every character moves with the analog stick. Tapping a direction twice will make the character enter a dashing state, which will last as long as you hold the direction and never return to neutral, unless you use a move or get hit. Jumping during this state, even if it's immediately after dashing, will make the character go further and faster than a normal jump would take them.

By pressing L1, a character will block. This prevents damage so long as it doesn't break through repeatedly being hit or blocking especially strong moves. Blocking just before being hit will perform a "Parry", doing damage and potentially staggering/knocking enemies down, allowing for a follow-up combo. Specific enemies and bosses can utilize this as well.

By holding L1 and tapping a direction, characters do a semi-invincible evade/roll animation in the direction you tapped. Doing this with proper timing can enter an enemies defense and even bypass certain attacks. New to Sengoku BASARA 4, performing it at the last second, similar to a Parry, will trigger a "Detect" which has a different animation and maneuvers you around an attacking opponent. Bosses can utilize this as well.

=== Combat system ===
By pressing and continuing to press square, every character does a string of basic attacks, often referred to as a "S-String". The amount of hits, as well as potential properties to each of these attacks, differ on a per-character basis, but every character can general cancel any one of the hits into one of their many special moves. These special skills come in the form of several different inputs. Every character has one tied to the following; Triangle, Direction + Triangle, R1, L1/Guard+Triangle, L1/Guard+Square (4 Sumeragi only), and by holding the Square button. The names change on a per-character basis, as do what they actually do, and their properties, much like the S-String. Depending on the character, some moves can also be done in the air, and may have different effects when used there as well.

Each character also has a 'Special' skill tied to the R2 button. In the two previous installments, the player would select one between three total skills before a battle. New to Sengoku BASARA 4, the player can now switch between them on the fly with by holding L1 and pressing R2. The name of the special skill currently equipped is also shown on the HUD above the players health bar.

A BASARA move also exists. By pressing Circle when the BASARA gauge, found right below the health bar, is full, the character will perform a unique sequence of movements and attacks. This move, called a BASARA, is very damaging and can be used in both crowd control or boss fight scenarios. Players fill the BASARA gauge by hitting enemies, getting hit, performing long combos, picking up items that fill the gauge manually, taunting, or by letting it refill over time when dangerously low on health. The character is fully invincible during the move until it ends. Enemy generals no longer have access to these moves like in the previous game but people say that they're still difficult to defeat.

Another gauge on the screen, the Style Gauge, is filled only by combos and specific items, and the rate at which it fills is increased by how large your combo is. When it's full, a player can press L1+R1 and enter Stylish Climax, a mode similar to Battle Drive or Sengoku Boost found in previous titles. When active, time slows slightly and the player gains a lot of strength and speed, making it useful in many possible places. As a bonus, utilizing a BASARA during this mode turns it into a Stylish BASARA for drastically increased damage.

Additional benefits of the combat system come from the Dash and Evade mechanics. Certain characters can cancel specific moves with these mechanics, though which of the two is another specific thing, allowing for much more combo ability in certain scenarios. Slow and combo unfriendly characters in previous installments benefit from this exceptionally, allowing much longer combo strings through the use of this mechanic.

Players will be accompanied by a war buddy through the game who can be given commands by pressing the L2 and dragging a circle towards the desired target. This can be used on enemies, boxes, bases, etc.

This ally can be also tagged after they reach level 50, by pressing the R3 button. If tagged mid-combo, characters will immediately perform an attack upon switching to continue the chain.

== Sengoku BASARA 4 Sumeragi Anniversary Edition ==
In 2020, the Sengoku BASARA series celebrated its 15th anniversary, and Capcom marked the occasion with Sengoku BASARA 4 Sumeragi Anniversary Edition, a PlayStation 4 re-release of Sumeragi that launched in Japan on July 21, 2020. The edition packages the game with 66 pieces of downloadable content, including additional costumes and sets of music from earlier titles in the series as well as songs by T.M.Revolution, Abingdon Boys School, and Chiaki Ishikawa.

The physical release, priced at 5,990 yen plus tax, also came with a special art box, a product code for ten weapon-related downloadable items, and the 80-page booklet Sengoku Heroes 15th Anniversary Records, which features interviews and artwork spanning the series' history. A digital "Anniversary Set" containing the game and all 66 downloadable items was sold for 5,445 yen plus tax, and a bundle containing only the downloadable content was also made available.

== Reception ==
Sengoku BASARA 4 has received "generally favorable" reviews from critics and consumers. Famitsu gave the game scores of 9/9/9/8 for a total of 35/40, and gave it a "Platinum Award". Media Create reported that the game had sold a total of 176,313 physical units during its first week on sale in Japan and was the top-selling game of the week. The game was also reported to have been the top-selling game of the week at both the Tsutaya chain and on the PlayStation Network during its first week on sale in Japan, with exact sales figures having not been reported. Sengoku BASARA 4 won a "Future Award" at the Japan Game Awards 2013.

In order to increase awareness of the game, Capcom chose ten different game stores across Japan to display Sengoku BASARA 4 standees and flags. This attracted a lot of customers that passed by, with them using these opportunities to take photos with their favorite characters. These ten game stores also offered in-store demo events to mark the run up to the game's release, attracting tons of customers and fans. Participants at these events will be able to receive special Sengoku BASARA 4 bags which have been given away at a few events in the past. Game shops all over Japan have also attracted customers and fans by playing footage from the game along with the opening video and fourth promotional video ('PV4').

== Collaborations ==
On December 2, 2013, an endorsement was made from the cast of Sengoku BASARA saying for Japanese fans to like 47 Ronin's Japanese Facebook page or follow its Twitter account, and then to post or tweet about the 47 Ronin movie using the #RONIN_BASARA hashtag. Doing so can result in fans winning either a free copy of Sengoku BASARA 4 for the PS3 or a 47 Ronin poster signed by the film's cast. Ten people will win a copy of Sengoku BASARA 4 for the PS3, while only one person will get a 47 Ronin poster signed by the film's cast. The deadline was January 23, 2014. This was done in order to advertise and raise the popularity of 47 Ronin in Japan.

== Events ==
On March 30 and March 31, 2013, BASARA Matsuri 2013 was held at the Ryōgoku Kokugikan sumo hall in Tokyo, Japan. At the end of the event for each performance, Capcom would announce Sengoku BASARA 4 for the PlayStation 3 with a 2014 release by showing a teaser trailer which also showed two silhouettes of two brand new characters (revealed later to be Shima Sakon, and Shibata Katsuie). The event had 2 performances. One on March 30, 2013, and one on March 31, 2013. Each performance had 6,000 attendants for a total of 12,000 attendants. 12,000 tickets were made for the event with 6,000 for the first performance and 6,000 for the second performance, and all of them managed to sell out in advance.

== Soundtrack ==
The opening theme for the base game is "Count ZERO" by T.M.Revolution, and the ending theme is "Runners high" by SCANDAL. The opening theme for its complete edition is "DOUBLE-DEAL" by T.M.Revolution, and the ending theme is "Heavenly Blue" by Chiaki Ishikawa. The game's original soundtrack was written by Hiromitsu Maeba, Rei Kondoh, Masayoshi Ishi, Masahiro Aoki, Azusa Kato, Yasutaka Hatade, Satoshi Okubo, and Sara Sakurai, and was released in Japan on January 29, 2014.
