= Sakura Revolution =

Single by Hisayo Mochizuki Nana Mizuki Natsuko Kuwatani Yumiko Kobayashi
- B-side: Chīsana te (小さな手); Love States ~Rabu Suteitsu~ (Love States 〜ラブ ステイツ〜)
- Released: January 1, 2002
- Recorded: 2001
- Genre: J-pop
- Length: 26:03
- Label: Starchild
- Songwriter(s): Natsumi Tadano (只野菜摘); Yuka Hiroki (広木由架); Yōko Netsu (根津洋子)

Hisayo Mochizuki Nana Mizuki Natsuko Kuwatani Yumiko Kobayashi singles chronology
"Sakura Revolution" (2002)	"Kokuhaku "Kimeteyo!"" (2002)

Sakura Revolution is the first single released by Prits, a voice acting unit composed of Hisayo Mochizuki, Nana Mizuki, Natsuko Kuwatani, and Yumiko Kobayashi; all joined from the anime, Sister Princess. The first track, Sakura Revolution is also included in Dengeki G's Radio Complication Mini Album "G Raji Ongakubu" as well as its G's Mix version. In addition, Prits' sister unit Friends (under the same Starchild sub-label) released a rearranged version of Sakura Revolution.

== Track listing ==
No.	Title	Lyrics	Length
1.	"Sakura Revolution"	Natsumi Tadano (只野菜摘)	4:35
2.	"Chīsana te (小さな手)"	Yuka Hiroki (広木由架)	4:07
3.	"Love States ~Rabu Suteitsu~ (Love States 〜ラブ ステイツ〜)"	Yōko Netsu (根津洋子)	4:21
4.	"Sakura Revolution（instrumental）"		4:35
5.	"小さな手（instrumental）"		4:07
6.	"Love States 〜ラブ ステイツ〜（instrumental）"		4:21
