= Kokuhaku "Kimeteyo!" =

"Kokuhaku "Kimeteyo!" (告白“決めてよ!”)"

Single by Hisayo Mochizuki Nana Mizuki Natsuko Kuwatani Yumiko Kobayashi
- A-side: Kokuhaku "Kimeteyo!" (告白“決めてよ!”)
- B-side: Frozen Lover; Party DE Bon Appetit!
- Released: February 1, 2002
- Recorded: 2002
- Genre: J-pop
- Length: 24:03
- Label: Starchild
- Songwriter(s): Anna Suzuki; Natsumi Tadano (只野菜摘); Karen Shiina (椎名可憐)

Hisayo Mochizuki Nana Mizuki Natsuko Kuwatani Yumiko Kobayashi singles chronology
"Sakura Revolution" (2002)	"Kokuhaku "Kimeteyo!" (告白“決めてよ!”)" (2002)	"Private Emotion" (2002)

"Kokuhaku "Kimeteyo!"" is the second single released by Prits, a voice acting unit composed of Hisayo Mochizuki, Nana Mizuki, Natsuko Kuwatani, and Yumiko Kobayashi; all joined from the anime, Sister Princess. This particular album is part of the "three-month spree" of releasing singles by this voice acting unit under the Starchild label. The first track, Kokuhaku "Kimeteyo!" (告白“決めてよ!”) is also included in Dengeki G's Radio Complication Mini Album "G Raji Ongakubu". Natsuko Kuwatani, one of the four singers, introduced the second track, Frozen Lover, as a part of the coming album called cherry blossom during a radio session; once misunderstood the atmosphere of the song as "love being melted like ice cream or sherbet would" because she did not study the lyrics in advance.

== Track listing ==
No.	Title	Lyrics	Length
1.	"Kokuhaku "Kimeteyo!" (告白“決めてよ!”)"	Anna Suzuki	4:06
2.	"Frozen Lover"	Natsumi Tadano (只野菜摘)	4:22
3.	"Party DE Bon Appetit!"	Karen Shiina (椎名可憐)	3:33
4.	"告白“決めてよ!”（instrumental）"		4:06
5.	"Frozen Lover（instrumental）"		4:22
6.	"Party DE Bon Appetit!（instrumental）"		3:33
