= Date Masamune (Sengoku Basara) =

Sengoku Basara character

- Sengoku Basara character
- Date Masamune's character portrait as seen in Sengoku BASARA 4, and Sengoku BASARA 4 Sumeragi.
- First game: Devil Kings (2005)
- Created by: Yuichiro Hiraki
- Designed by: Makoto Tsuchibayashi
- Voiced by: EN: Kirby Morrow (Devil Kings); EN: Robert McCollum (Other works); EN: Reuben Langdon (Sengoku Basara: Samurai Heroes); JP: Kazuya Nakai

Date Masamune (Japanese: 伊達 政宗) is a character from Capcom's Sengoku Basara video game franchise, first introduced in the 2005 video game Devil Kings. In the North American and European versions, he is known as a warrior named Azure Dragon, but retained his original name in the series' third title. As with most Sengoku Basara characters, Masamune was loosely based on Japanese historical figure Date Masamune.

Capcom created this fictional version of him in order to show an appeal based on the character's dragon motifs inherited from the real Date Masamune. Additionally, Masamune's design was intended show a major contrast to one of the other protagonists from the series, Sanada Yukimura. Despite initial mixed reactions to Masamune's designs based on him wielding six swords at once, critics praised the characterization of Masamune in both the games and anime series based on multiple traits.

== Creation and development ==
In the making of Sengoku Basara, Capcom researched important figures from Japan's Warring States (Sengoku) period, and after noticing that Date Masamune and Sanada Yukimura were highly popular within them, decided to use the two as protagonists. Sengoku Basara 3 composer Masahiro Aoki associated Masamune with the electric guitar, and wrote a hard rock tune for Masamune's horse-racing game stage. Aoki also stated that Masamune's theme, "Dead Heat", was one of his favorite songs from the game. The character was created by Yuichiro Hiraki.

Masamune was the first character created for the franchise, with Makoto Tsuchibayashi designing him. The first problem Tsuchibayashi faced was the shape of his swords (known as "Dragon Claws"), which were to resemble dragon fins. He sketched out the way he wanted the swords to hang at Masamune's hips but had trouble deciding how the rest should look from behind. The second consideration was the shape of his swords' scabbards. In Tsuchibayashi's original design, Masamune's jinbaori coat was draped over the top part of the scabbards which concealed their shape. He eventually decided to adapt the design to retain the imagery of the scabbards as the "One-eyed Dragon's gills". For the design of his jinbaori coat, he considered a long skirt-like version which reached Masamune's ankles, then tried shortening it slightly and giving it a jagged edge for a rougher look. A shorter version of his first design was also tried. In the end, he selected a shorter version and kept the jagged edge to represent a dragon. Having the title of the "One-eyed Dragon of Oshu" in Japanese history, Tsuchibayashi designed Masamune with multiple swords with the image of dragons to continue this theme. Masamune was given the color blue to contrast with the red of Yukimura and his clan. These color motifs signified the relationship that both Masamune and Yukimura have throughout the games. In Sengoku Basara 4, Masamune can also wear an alternate costume based on Dante from Devil May Cry.

In the English-localized version of the first Sengoku Basara, Masamune was renamed Azure Dragon. Masamune's English voicing varies from game to game. For Devil Kings, Kirby Morrow voiced him while Reuben Langdon voiced him in Sengoku Basara: Samurai Heroes. Robert McCollum took the English role in all of the other Sengoku Basara English titles which were the anime adaptations. In every Japanese game, Masamune is voiced by Kazuya Nakai, who stated in 2013 that he cherishes Masamune as a part of himself, and that he is one of his favorite characters he has ever voiced.

== Appearances ==
=== In Sengoku Basara video games ===
Masamune debuted as a playable character in Capcom's action game Devil Kings from 2005. The leader of the Date clan, Masamune is a samurai who wishes to unify Japan. During the story, Masamune encounters the Takeda clan samurai, Sanada Yukimura, with whom he forms a friendly rivalry with. However, Masamune is also opposed by a warlord named Oda Nobunaga, who seeks to defeat Masamune and other warlords in order to achieve his goals of conquering Japan with an iron fist.

In the events of Sengoku Basara 2, Masamune and Yukimura continue their rivalry and once again face a new threat: Toyotomi Hideyoshi, who seeks to conquer all of Japan under his banner. In the next sequel, Sengoku Basara: Samurai Heroes, Hideyoshi has been killed by Tokugawa Ieyasu while Masamune is nearly finished by Mitsunari Ishida, one of Hideyoshi's retainers. This led to the weakening of Oshu's power. He fights against Mitsunari in order to win back his lost honor. Following Masamune's revenge, he once again faces Yukimura but decides to spare his life, having bonded with him across the story.

Masamune next appeared in Sengoku Basara 4, a mixture of a sequel and an alternate retelling of the events of the original three games. Masamune once again seeks to conquer Japan and is mainly opposed by Ashikaga Yoshiteru. Following Sengoku Basara 4, Capcom created a new title which features a younger Masamune as a playable character in a smaller role, as the game focuses more on Yukimura. During Masamune's story, he is confronted by Hideyoshi but loses the fight.

=== Adaptations and other media ===
In the anime adaptations of Sengoku Basara: Samurai Kings, Masamune's role is similar to the one from the games. In the first season, Masamune befriends Yukimura across their fights but starts feeling fear upon confronting Nobunaga. In order to overcome his fears and help a saddened Yukimura, Masamune disbands the Date clan's forces to prepare for the battle against Nobunaga. In the climax, both Masamune and Yukimura join forces to kill Nobunaga.

During the second season, Masamune defeats Yukimura but shortly after this he faces Hideyoshi. Hideyoshi easily defeats Masamune, leaving him with multiple wounds. Masamune manages to kill Hideyoshi in the ending of the second season. However, this causes Mitsunari's rage in the film Sengoku Basara: The Last Party where he seeks the death of Masamune. Masamune nearly dies in the battle against the avenger which causes all of his men to create an armor strong enough to deflect any attack. Masamune then prepares to finish Mitsunari, but Ieyasu interrupts the battle to seek peace. Nobunaga is revived and the warriors join their efforts to stop his plans to destroy Japan. In the movie's ending, Nobunaga is defeated and Masamune once again battles Yukimura to know who is the stronger warrior.

A new anime based on the hit video game, Sengoku Basara: Samurai Heroes, shows a scene with Masamune being lectured by Kojuro during the time he frets over his powerlessness. A third anime series shows Masamune as a high school student in modern-day Japan.

Masamune was planned to be added to the crossover fighting game Tatsunoko vs. Capcom but was removed due to time constraints. A manga adaptation of the second game was created by Yak Haibara with Masamune being one of the three main protagonists. A live-action television drama titled Sengoku Basara: Moonlight Party premiered on July 12, 2012, with Masamune portrayed by Kento Hayashi. In a Sengoku Basara stage play that made a crossover with the series Devil May Cry, Masamune was played by Daichi Yamaguchi.

== Reception ==
Date Masamune as seen in the Miyagi election's advertisements.

In a poll from Japanese fan magazine Newtype, Masamune was voted the 21st most-popular male anime character from the 2000s. In July 2009, he took the 10th spot of the season. In 2009, Masamune's image was used by Capcom to raise awareness of an election in Miyagi Prefecture, a video game first, noting in a press release that "warlord samurai turned video game sensation, Date Masamune is a household name in Miyagi Prefecture. This campaign aims to use the broad appeal Date Masamune has among the residents of the prefecture to draw attention to the election and increase the turnout of younger voters."

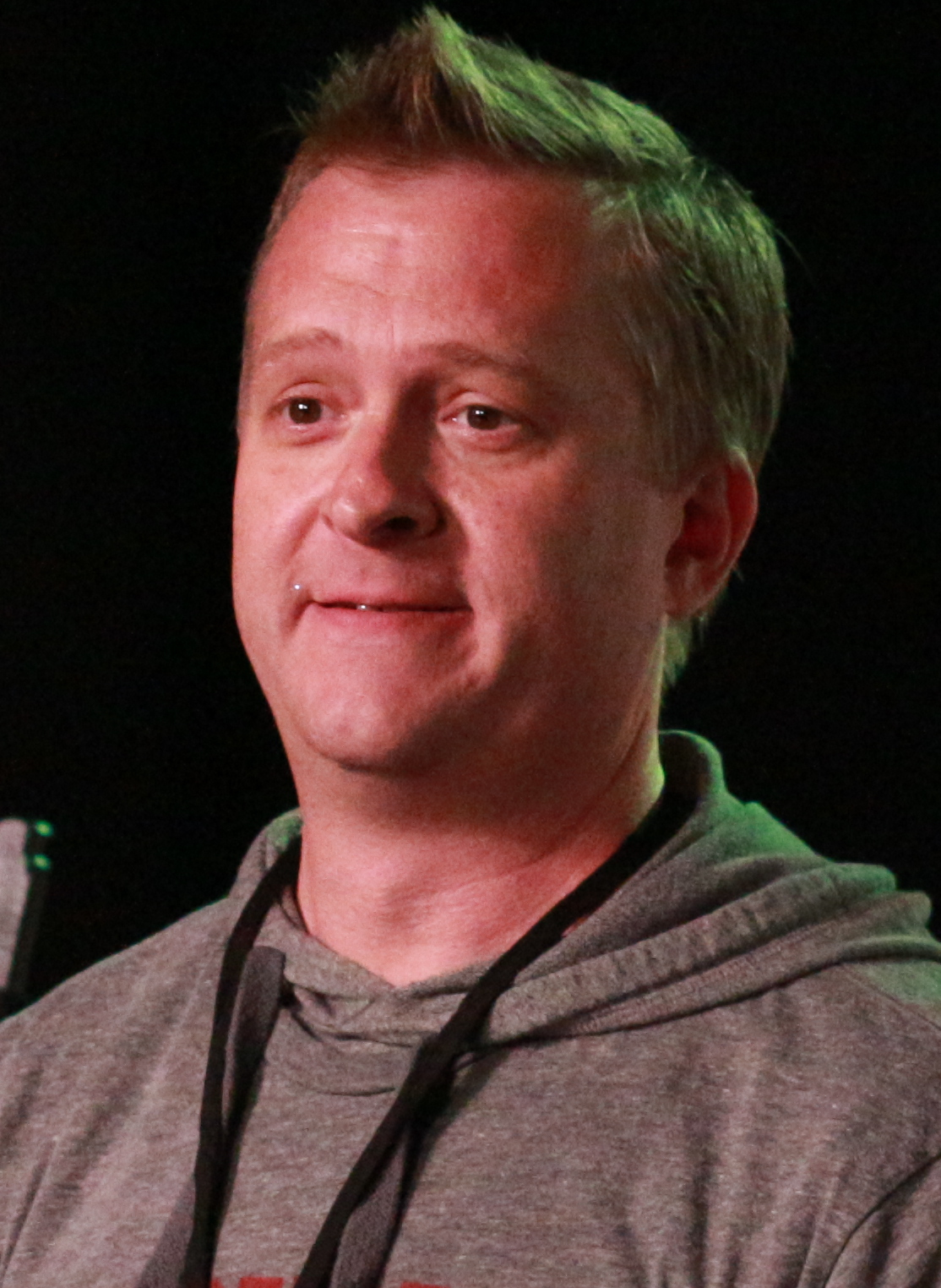
McCollum's English acting as Masamune has earned praise by critics.

Initial reactions to Masamune focused on his particular use of six swords, with GamesRadar jokingly speculating that they were behind Masamune having an eye patch. Nintendo World Report primarily noted how distant Masamune's characterization was from his historical counterpart as well as how he wields six swords. Japanator liked Masamune's character, most notably his relationship with Sanada Yukimura despite the irony that none of these historical figures ever met. While liking the English dub, the reviewer lamented the fact the video games lacked his Japanese voice actor, who made heavy use of Masamune's trope of using Engrish.

Game Revolution stated that they found Masamune and Yukimura to be unique characters in the franchise whose physical looks would amaze players. GameRant praised Masamune's and Yukimura's rivalry not only for their respect to each other but also the passion each feels when fighting especially with Yukimura's comment about how his heart changed upon their first encounter. GameRant also praised Masamune's rivalry with Ishida in later works though they energy tends to depend on animated version. Japanator praised both Robert McCullum and Kazuya Nakai for providing appealing voices for Masamune in English and Japanese, respectively. A similar response to Nakai's voice acting was given by Otaku News based on the delivery of Masamune's Engrish lines. Toon Zone felt that McCollum also gave a good performance as Masamune.

Critics had also focused on Masamune's role in the anime adaptation of the series, which was generally positive. FandomPost liked the action scenes featured by the two protagonists of the anime as seen in the English release of the series. Blu-ray noted that the development of Masamune and Yukimura's friendship served as one of the strongest parts of the first season, with Otaku News also enjoying the balance between these two protagonists despite their differences in personality and methods of action. Anime Herald agreed and noted the two rivals' "rise to greatness" across their fights and the lessons they learned in the series. While liking the first season's fight scenes between Masamune and Yukimura, Fandom Post felt that the second season managed to further develop these characters, with Masamune facing conflicts with his advisor Kojuro which made him more vulnerable than in the first season.

In regards to the film finale Sengoku Basara: The Last Party, Masamune's rivalry with Ishida Mitsunari was praised due to its tragic beginnings and eventual revenge clashes between Masamune and Mitsunari. This subplot was noted to be one of the major highlights of the movie. Anime News Network felt the fight scenes featuring Masamune were highly entertaining due to the visuals the anime staff provided. Japanator noted that Masamune was his favorite character from the games and believed Production I.G succeeded in adapting all of his action scenes.

In The Folk Art of Japanese Gamers, Masamune was noted to have become popular with Sengoku Basara game despite lack of similarities with the historical figure. His design instead carries clothing depicted for "the ideal male"; In polls conducted in Japan, Masaumune was often listed as one of the best Sengoku Basara characters with messages written on the ema affirm that Basara is by no means an exception especially with female fans. In On Transmedia Storytelling and Historical Awareness in the Historical Video Game Sengoku Basara, the rivalry the character has with Yukimura is noted help to make him popular enough to be the subject of several types of promotion in Japan. While discussing this, Engadget noted that Masamune was far more popular in Eastern territories than Western territories due to the negative reception of Devil Kings. Nevertheless, the site expected the third game in the franchise to bring more appeal of Masamune to English players due to Capcom having it localized to be like the original.

In a Yahoo! Japan poll from 2010, Masamune was voted as third-most-popular video-game character, behind Hatsune Miku and Mario. In June 2009, JYB sold a tour in Japan known as Sengoku Basara: Masamune's Grand Tour. It focused on events related to Masamune and Kojuro. A total of 90% of the people who went there were females. Multiple types of merchandising based on the character have been released such as an identical helmet. In a series of Sengoku Basara magazines, Masamune has been featured prominently in the first issue as the volume highly focuses on his role in the franchise.
