= Sengoku Basara: The Last Party =

2011 film

- Official release poster of the movie Sengoku Basara: The Last Party
- Genre: Action
- Anime film
- Directed by: Kazuya Nomura
- Produced by: George Wada; Toshihiro Maeda; Tetsuya Kinoshita; Keiichi Nozaki; Kozue Kaneniwa; Makoto Furukawa; Fumi Teranishi
- Written by: Yasuyuki Muto
- Music by: Hiroyuki Sawano
- Studio: Production I.G
- Licensed by: NA: Crunchyroll; UK: Manga Entertainment
- Released: June 4, 2011
- Runtime: 95 minutes

Sengoku Basara: The Last Party (Japanese: 劇場版 戦国BASARA －The Last Party－) is an anime film that portrays the end of the Sengoku period. It is a sequel to an anime series known as Sengoku Basara: Samurai Kings. The film was released in Japanese theaters on June 4, 2011. Kazuya Nakai, Sōichirō Hoshi, Tōru Ōkawa, Tomokazu Seki, Masakazu Morita, Toshiyuki Morikawa, Takehito Koyasu, Norio Wakamoto, and Mamiko Noto reprise their roles from the Samurai Kings series with Fumihiko Tachiki, Show Hayami, and Jun Fukuyama co-starring as those who first appeared in Sengoku Basara: Samurai Heroes.

== Plot ==
Japan is once again in turmoil as a subordinate of Toyotomi Hideyoshi, Ishida Mitsunari cuts a wrath of fury across the land while other warlords rally for an era of peace. Date Masamune and Sanada Yukimura must fight Mitsunari in order to bring the country to peace.

== Summary ==
In the aftermath of Hideyoshi's defeat at the hands of Date Masamune, the late warlord's retainer Ishida Mitsunari grieves his master attempts to single-handedly invade Osshu. Pressing through the territory of Mogami Yoshiaki, Ishida is intercepted by Masamune. The two duel, but the One-Eyed Dragon is uninterested in Mitsunari's blind hatred, so he challenges the warrior to return with an army before leaving. Despite appearing fine on his return to Oshu, Masamune succumbs to injuries Mitsunari inflicted.

Meanwhile, the forces of Takeda Shingen have totally defeated the forces of Uesugi Kenshin. Shingen prepares to execute his rival, but is stopped by Tokugawa Ieyasu, who admonishes both leaders to aid him in his quest to unite the country through common bonds. Though they refuse to join his cause, Shingen and Kenshin agree to a ceasefire while he tries his methods. Moved by Ieyasu's conviction, Sanada challenges his master's decision. The Tiger of Kai then decides to hand command of his forces to Yukimura and retire.

Mitsunari regroups with his strategist Ōtani Yoshitsugu, who has formed a plan to lure Date to them. As Date recovers from his wounds, his right hand Kojūrō informs him that Mitsunari has raised an army that is slaughtering soldiers and civilians all across Japan. Feeling responsible for Mistunari's rampage, Date prepares to hunt the assassin down. Meanwhile, Tokugawa and his allies scatter to recruit more generals to their cause. As he travels, Tokugawa recalls his failed attempt to dissuade Mitsunari from vengeance. As everyone begins making their moves, Oichi, the true cause of the massacres, attacks another village under instruction from Tenkai, who is collaborating with Ōtani. In the wake of the slaughter, soldiers plant evidence that Ieyasu was behind the attack to turn the country against him.

Tenkai then has Kobayakawa Hideaki forge letters in Ieyasu's handwriting, claiming responsibility for the rampages and calling Japan's generals to gather at Sekigahara. Refusing to believe Ieyasu is responsible, Yukimura sets out for the gathering place to prove his innocence. Along the way, the Date and Takeda forces run into each other - ironically at the same place the two warriors first fought. Overcome by nostalgia, the two duel until Maeda Keiji breaks them up, convincing them to hold off on fighting until after Sekigahara.

The two armies arrive last to the meeting, in the middle of Tokugawa's call to stop warring with each other. He nearly gets through to everyone, but the sudden arrival of Ishida and his army triggers a melee. Ieyasu, Maede, and Yukimura reluctantly join the fray, further complicated by the arrival of Mōri Motonari, who winds up battling Chōsokabe Motochika. In the midst of the fighting, Date and Mitsunari duel, and Tenkai sics Oichi on the battlefield. Ishida gains the upper hand, but as he goes for a deathblow, it fails thanks to special armor Masamune's retainers forged for him. Masamune turns the tables and goes for a killstrike of his own, but Ieyasu takes the attack in his former ally's stead. At that moment, Oichi uses her dark powers - augmented by the bloodshed on the battlefield - to resurrect her brother Oda Nobunaga, who feeds on the lives of various soldiers to anchor him to the world of the living.

Date, Yukimura, Maede, Sarutobi Sasuke, Kojuro, Ieyasu, and Mitsunari confront the Devil King, but his power is even greater than before. Mitsunari refuses to yield, but he is saved when Ōtani sacrifices himself to slow Oda's resurrection. Using the opening, the remaining fighters launch one final volley, but it fails. Nearby, Tenkai prepares to kill Oichi, but she is spurred by the spirit of her late husband to kill Tenkai and stop her brother. Before Oda can finish the last of his opposition, Mitsunari uses the last of his strength to wound him, buying Oichi time to arrive. She sacrifices herself to send Oda back to the afterlife, ending the battle.

In the aftermath, Mitsunari agrees to drop his vendetta against Masamune so long as he sticks to his moral principles, and Ieyasu suggests Ishida join him. He refuses, so Ieyasu challenges him to a duel over the matter. At the same time, Date and Yukimura decide to settle their rivalry once and for all, continuing the turbulence of the Sengoku Era.

== Music ==
The opening theme song is "FLAGS", while the ending theme song is "The party must go on" both performed by T.M. Revolution.

== Reception ==
Masamune's rivalry with Ishida Mitsunari was praised due to its tragic beginnings and eventual revenge clashes between Masamune and Mitsunari. This subplot was noted to be one of the major highlights of the movie. Anime News Network felt the fight scenes featuring Masamune were highly entertaining due to the visuals the anime staff provided. They felt the fight scenes featuring Yukimura were highly entertaining due to the visuals provided by the anime staff. They also noted his growth as a character having inherited the leadership from Shingen. Japanator noted that Masamune was his favorite character from the games and believed Production I.G succeeded in adapting all of his action scenes.
