= Natsuko Kuwatani =

Japanese voice actress

- 桑谷 夏子
- Born: August 8, 1978 (age 48); Ōme, Tokyo, Japan
- Occupation: Voice actress
- Years active: 1998–present
- Height: 148 cm (4 ft 10 in)
- Website: https://natsukokuwatani.com/

'

Natsuko Kuwatani (桑谷 夏子, Kuwatani Natsuko; born August 8, 1978 in Ōme, Tokyo) is a Japanese voice actress. Her major roles are in anime shows and they include Yue Ayase in Negima, Fiore in Chrono Crusade, Alph in Nanoha, Michiru in Magikano, Suiseiseki in Rozen Maiden, Yae Shinatsuhiko in Yozakura Quartet and Sae Kawano in Yurumates. In video games she voices Kasuga in Sengoku Basara.

On September 30, 2023, Kuwatani left I'm Enterprise after 15 years.

== Filmography ==
=== Anime ===
2001

- Kokoro Library (Usagi)
- Sister Princess (Karen)
- Najica Blitz Tactics (Kirara Mitsuboshi)

2002

- Kiddy Grade (Tweedledee)
- Getbackers (Himiko Kudou)
- Sister Princess: Re Pure (Karen)

2003

- Chrono Crusade (Florette "Fiore" Harvenheit)
- Scrapped Princess (Farfel)
- Dokkoida?! (Karen)
- The World of Narue (Rei Otonashi)
- Last Exile (Alistia Agrew)

2004

- Aqua Kids (Rio)
- Inuyasha (Shima)
- Girls Bravo (Lilica Stacy)
- Viewtiful Joe (Silvia)
- Futakoi (Koi Chigusa)
- Magical Girl Lyrical Nanoha (Alph)
- Maria Watches Over Us (Tomoko)
- Midori Days (Beniko Iwasaki)
- Rozen Maiden (Suiseiseki)

2005

- He Is My Master (Alicia)
- Solty Rei (Kasha Maverick)
- Transformers: Cybertron (Chromia)
- Futakoi Alternative (Koi Chigusa)
- Onegai My Melody (Chumi)
- PetoPeto-san (Kiyomi Akazawa)
- Magical Girl Lyrical Nanoha A's (Alph)
- Mahou Sensei Negima! (Yue Ayase)
- Rozen Maiden: Träumend (Suiseiseki)

2006

- Ouran High School Host Club (Kanako Kasugazaki)
- Canvas 2: Niji Iro no Sketch (Nanoha)
- Sgt. Frog (Chiroro)
- The Melancholy of Haruhi Suzumiya (Ryoko Asakura)
- Strawberry Panic! (Yaya Nanto)
- Negima!? (Yue Ayase)
- Magikano (Michiru Mamiya)
- Lovedol ~Lovely Idol~ (Toko Yuki)
- Rozen Maiden: Ouvertüre (Suiseiseki)

2007

- Hell Girl: Two Mirrors (Kiyo)
- Shonen Onmyouji (Tenko)
- Sketchbook ~full color'S~ (Fū Himuro)
- My Bride Is a Mermaid (Maki)
- Magical Girl Lyrical Nanoha StrikerS (Lutecia, Arf, Auris, Sette)

2008

- Special A (Sakura Ushikubo)
- Pocket Monsters: Diamond & Pearl (Haru)
- Yozakura Quartet (Yae Shinatsuhiko)

2009

- InuYasha: The Final Act (Mujina)
- Kiddy Girl-and (Tweedledee)
- Clannad After Story (Kimura)
- Saki (Satomi Kanbara)
- Hell Girl: Three Vessels (Yuki Miyajima)
- Sengoku Basara: Samurai Kings (Kasuga)

2010

- Sengoku Basara: Samurai Kings 2 (Kasuga)
- Hidamari Sketch × Hoshimittsu (Kuwahara, Trinity Azusa)
- Yumeiro Pâtissière (Mika Chinen)

2011

- Hidamari Sketch × SP (Kuwahara)
- Freezing (Miyabi Kannazuki)
- Mayo Chiki! (Maria)
- Future Diary (Ai Mikami)
- Last Exile: Fam, The Silver Wing (Alister Agrew)

2012

- Arashi no Yoru ni: Himitsu no Tomodachi (Lily)
- Saki Episode of Side A (Satomi Kanbara)
- Horizon in the Middle of Nowhere Season 2 (William Cecil, F. Walsingham)
- Tanken Driland (Lina)
- Hidamari Sketch × Honeycomb (Kuwahara)
- Busou Shinki (Mary Takigawa Celes)
- Persona 4: The Animation (Sayoko Uehara)
- Yurumates3Dei (Sae Kawano)
- Yurumates3Dei Plus (Sae Kawano)

2013

- Yozakura Quartet: Hana no Uta (Yae Shinatsuhiko)
- Rozen Maiden: Zurückspulen (Suiseiseki)

2014

- Saki - The Nationals (Satomi Kanbara)
- Jinsei (Nanako Mikami)
- Sengoku Basara: End of Judgement (Kasuga)
- Hamatora (Misty)

2015

- Charlotte (Yusa's Mother)
- The Disappearance of Nagato Yuki-chan (Ryoko Asakura)
- Magical Girl Lyrical Nanoha ViVid (Lutecia Alpine)

2016

- ViVid Strike! (Lutecia Alpine)
- Detective Conan (Kumi Suda)
- Schwarzesmarken (Suzy Cave)
- Handa-kun (Emi Handa)

2017

- Blue Exorcist: Kyoto Saga (Satoru's mother)
- Sakura Quest (Kiyomi Hīragi)

2018

- Hugtto! PreCure (Sumire Nono)
- One Piece (Gerth)
- Free: Dive to the Future (Young Ikuya Kirishima)

2019

- Demon Slayer: Kimetsu no Yaiba (Rui's Mother)

=== Theatrical animation ===
- The Disappearance of Haruhi Suzumiya (2010) – Ryōko Asakura
- Negima! Anime Final (2011) – Yue Ayase
- Sengoku Basara: The Last Party (2011) – Yumekichi

=== Original video animation (OVA) ===
- Love Hina Again (2002) – Kanako Urashima
- Memories Off 5 the Animation (2006) – Kazuki Mishima
- Negima! Shiroki Tsubasa Ala Alba (2008) – Yue Ayase
- Negima! Mo Hitotsu no Sekai (2009) – Yue Ayase
- Tenchi Muyo! War on Geminar (2009) – Chiaia Furan
- Yozakura Quartet ~Hoshi no Umi~ (2010) – Yae Shinatsuhiko
- Baby Princess (2011) – Mama
- The Beheading Cycle: The Blue Savant and the Nonsense Bearer (2016) – Akari Chiga

=== Video games ===
- Devil Kings (Kasuga)
- Fire Emblem: Akatsuki no Megami (Micaiah)
- Fire Emblem Heroes and Fire Emblem Engage (Micaiah)
- Hyperdimension Neptunia (Gust)
- Hyperdimension Neptunia Mk2 (Gust)
- La Pucelle: Tactics (Éclair)
- Lovely Idol (Tōko Yuki)
- Mugen no Frontier: Super Robot Wars OG Saga (Dorothy Mistral, Henne Valkyria)
- Sengoku Basara 2 (Kasuga)
- Sengoku Basara 4 (Kasuga)
- Sengoku Basara: Samurai Heroes (Kasuga)
- Sengoku Basara X (Kasuga)
- Triggerheart Exelica Enhanced (Faintear Imitate)
- True Love Story: Summer Days, and yet... (Kusunose Hina 楠瀬緋菜)
- Umineko: When They Cry (Erika Furudo)
