= Kazuya Nakai =

Japanese voice actor and narrator (born 1967)

- 中井 和哉
- Born: November 25, 1967 (age 58); Kobe, Hyōgo Prefecture, Japan
- Occupations: Voice actor; narrator
- Years active: 1995–present
- Agent: Aoni Production
- Notable credit(s): One Piece as Roronoa Zoro; Gintama as Toshirō Hijikata; Fire Force as Akitaru Ōbi xxxHolic as Shizuka Dōmeki; Persona 3 as Shinjiro Aragaki; Danganronpa as Mondo Owada; Samurai Champloo as Mugen; Ultraman Max as Ultraman Max; Ghost of Tsushima as Jin Sakai (Japanese VA); Sengoku Basara as Date Masamune; Digimon Savers as Gaomon; Digimon Ghost Game as Angoramon
- Children: 2

Kazuya Nakai (中井 和哉, Nakai Kazuya; born November 25, 1967) is a Japanese voice actor and narrator who was born in Kobe, Japan. He plays Roronoa Zoro in One Piece, Toshiro Hijikata from Gintama, Date Masamune from Sengoku Basara, Xiahou Dun and Dian Wei from Dynasty Warriors and Warriors Orochi series, Shinjiro Aragaki from the Persona series, Mugen from Samurai Champloo, Mondo Owada from the Danganronpa series, Ultraman Max in Ultraman Max and Jin Sakai in the Japanese dub of the video game Ghost of Tsushima.

He won a Best Supporting Actor award at the 5th Seiyu Awards in 2011 for his roles in One Piece and Gin Tama.

== Filmography ==
=== Anime ===
List of voice performances in anime
Year	Series	Role	Notes	Source
1996	After War Gundam X	Witz Sou	Debut role	
1996	Sailor Moon Sailor Stars	Ittou Asanuma		
1996	Dragon Ball GT	Villager / Heishi B		
1998	Blue Submarine No. 6	Captain of the Shang		
1999	Angel Links	Sergei		
1999–present	One Piece	Roronoa Zoro, Pierre, Charlotte Nusstorte		
2001	Hellsing	Jan Valentine	TV series	
2002	Ultimate Muscle	Hanzou		
2002	Ai Yori Aoshi	Suzuki		
2002	Detective Conan	Takashi Kotegawa		
2003	Scrapped Princess	Galil, Socom		
2003	Battle Programmer Shirase	Akira Shirase		
2004	Inuyasha	Hoshiyomi		
2004	Ragnarok the Animation	Iruga		
2004	Samurai Champloo	Mugen		
2004	Samurai Gun	Matsuzaki Shunkai		
2004	Grenadier	Yajiro Kojima		
2005	Trinity Blood	Tres Iqus		
2005	Noein	Karasu, Noein		
2006–21	Gintama series	Toshiro Hijikata		
2006–10	xxxHolic series	Shizuka Dômeki		
2006	Jyu Oh Sei	Zagi		
2006	Death Note	Kanzo Mogi		
2006	Digimon Savers	Gaomon		
2006	Hataraki Man	Fumiya Sugawara		
2007	Nodame Cantabile	Kozou Etou		
2008	Blade of the Immortal	Taito Magatsu		
2008	Naruto Shippuden	Kazuma		
2009	Samurai Harem: Asu no Yoichi	Ryo Washizu		
2009	Asura Cryin'	Takaya Kagakagari	Also 2nd series	
2009–10	Sengoku Basara: Samurai Kings series	Date Masamune	Also Sengoku Basara II	
2009	First Love Limited	Gengorou Takei		
2009–10	Kiddy Girl-and	Torch		
2009	Dogs: Bullets & Carnage	Melvin Scrooge		
2009	Fullmetal Alchemist: Brotherhood	Major Miles		
2011	Nichijou	Three of Spades (card)	Episode 17	
2011	Blue Exorcist	Ryuji Suguro		
2011	Fate/Prototype	Lancer/Cú Chulainn	OVA	
2012	Brave 10	Nezu Jinpachi		
2012	Initial D Fifth Stage	Ryuji Ikeda		
2012–15	Kuroko's Basketball	Shōichi Imayoshi		
2012	Ixion Saga DT	Sainglain		
2013	Bakumatsu Gijinden Roman	Roman		
2013	Danganronpa: The Animation	Mondo Owada		
2013	Toriko	Roronoa Zoro	Ep. 99 (Note: Toriko episode 99, "Run, Strongest Army! Toriko, Luffy, Goku!", was a cross-over episode with One Piece and Dragon Ball Z)	
2013	Ghost in the Shell: Arise	Borma	OVA	
2014	Space Dandy	Dolph	Ep. 10	
2014	Nobunaga The Fool	Alexander		
2014	Magical Warfare	Kippei Washizu		
2014	Broken Blade	General Borcuse		
2014	Hero Bank	Fukuta Kanemaru		
2014	Aldnoah.Zero	Koichirō Marito		
2014	Sengoku Basara: End of Judgement	Date Masamune		
2015	Death Parade	Takashi		
2015	Blood Blockade Battlefront	Zapp Renfro	2nd Season in 2017	
2015	Ghost in the Shell: Arise – Alternative Architecture	Borma	TV series	
2015	God Eater	Soma Schicksal		
2016	Joker Game	Fukumoto		
2016	Girlish Number	Kuzu-P		
2016	Dragon Ball Super	Tagoma		
2017	All Out!!	Renpei Sakura		
2017	Rin-ne	Wandering Power Stone	Ep. 57	
2017	Altair: A Record of Battles	Balaban		
2017	Elegant Yokai Apartment Life	Akira Fukase		
2018	Boruto: Naruto Next Generations	Urashiki Ōtsutsuki		
2018	That Time I Got Reincarnated as a Slime	Laplace		
2018	Gakuen Basara	Date Masamune		
2019	RobiHachi	Robby Yarge		
2019	Fire Force	Akitaru Ōbi		
2019	Ahiru no Sora	Shinichi Chiba		
2019	Stars Align	Kenji Kyōbate		
2019	Ace of Diamond: Act II	Seiya Akashi		
2021	Life Lessons with Uramichi Oniisan	Furitsuke Capellini		
2021	Battle Game in 5 Seconds	Madoka Kirisaki		
2021	Digimon Ghost Game	Angoramon		
2021	Tesla Note	Kyōhei Himi		
2022	Love All Play	Hitoshi Ebihara		
2022	Tatami Time Machine Blues	Seitarō Higuchi	Replaced Keiji Fujiwara	
2022	Skeleton Knight in Another World	Fumba Soodu Rozombanya		
2022	Parallel World Pharmacy	Camus de Sade		
2023	Gamera Rebirth	Raymond Osborn		
2023	Heavenly Delusion	Robin Inazaki		
2023	Tōsōchū: The Great Mission	Sigma Red Wing		
2023	Pokémon Horizons: The Series	Brassius		
2023	Reborn as a Vending Machine, I Now Wander the Dungeon	Kerioil		
2024	Dandadan	Alien Serpo		
2024	Yakuza Fiancé: Raise wa Tanin ga Ii	Gaku Miyama		
2024	Puniru Is a Cute Slime	Hiroshi Mado		
2024	Rurouni Kenshin: Kyoto Disturbance	Shakku Arai		
2025	Sakamoto Days	Carolina Reaper		
2025	Digimon Beatbreak	Azuka Tenma		
2026	Jujutsu Kaisen	Kinji Hakari		

=== Films ===
List of voice performances in feature films
Year	Series	Role	Notes	Source
1995	Sailor Moon SuperS: The Movie	Oranja		
2000-22	One Piece films	Roronoa Zoro		
2005	xxxHolic: A Midsummer Night's Dream	Shizuka Dômeki		
2010	Bleach: Hell Verse	Kokuto		
2006	Keep it up!! Gametarō	Kokuto	A spinoff story of Gamera the Brave, and Gametarō is one of siblings of Toto (Gamera).	
2006	Digimon Savers Ultimate Power! Activate Burst Mode!!	Gaomon		
2010	Gintama: The Movie	Hijikata Toshirou		
2010	Broken Blade	General Borcuse		
2010	Bleach: Hell Verse	Kokutō		
2011	Sengoku Basara: The Last Party	Date Masamune		
2012	Rainbow Fireflies	Kenzo (adult)		
2013	Gintama: The Movie: The Final Chapter: Be Forever Yorozuya	Toshiro Hijikata		
2013	Persona 3 The Movie: No. 1, Spring of Birth	Shinjiro Aragaki		
2013	Persona 3 The Movie: No. 1, Spring of Birth	Shinjiro Aragaki		
2014	Detective Conan: Dimensional Sniper	Timothy Hunter		
2015	Dragon Ball Z: Resurrection 'F'	Tagoma		
2015	Ghost in the Shell: The Movie	Borma		
2017	The Night Is Short, Walk on Girl	Seitarō Higuchi		
2017	Haikara-san ga Tōru	Shingo Onijima		
2017	DC Super Heroes vs. Eagle Talon	Aquaman		
2017	Godzilla: Planet of the Monsters	Halu-Elu Dolu-do		
2018	Bungo Stray Dogs: Dead Apple	Tatsuhiko Shibusawa		
2018	Godzilla: City on the Edge of Battle	Halu-Elu Dolu-do		
2018	Mobile Suit Gundam Narrative	Iago Haakana		
2018	Godzilla: The Planet Eater	Halu-Elu Dolu-do		
2021	Gintama: The Very Final	Toshiro Hijikata		
2021	My Hero Academia: World Heroes' Mission	Flect Turn		
2021	The Journey	Musab		
2023	Birth of Kitarō: The Mystery of GeGeGe	Kōzō Ryūga		

=== Video games ===
List of voice performances in video games
Year	Series	Role	Notes	Source
1996	Meltylancer: Ginga Shoujo Keisatu 2086	Brass, Grianos	Sega Saturn	
1997	Dynasty Warriors series	Xiahou Dun, Dian Wei		
1997	Sparkling Feather	Garnet	PC FX	
1997	Langrisser IV	Cleones, Bruno, Rivers	Sega Saturn	
1997	Saturn Bomberman Fight!!	Denta	Sega Saturn	
2001	Final Fantasy X	Wakka	PS2	
2002	Kingdom Hearts	Wakka	PS2	
2003	Final Fantasy X-2	Wakka	PS2	
2004	Mobile Suit Gundam SEED: Never Ending Tomorrow	Barry Ho	PS2	
2005	Sengoku Basara series	Date Masamune		
2006	Persona 3	Shinjiro Aragaki	PS2	
2006–2008	Tokimeki Memorial Girl's Side: 2nd Kiss	Katsumi Shiba	PS2, Also Second season for NDS	
2006	Gundam Battle Royale	Eigar	PSP	
2006	JoJo's Bizarre Adventure: Phantom Blood	Jonathan Joestar (child)	PS2	
2007	Shining Wind	Hyoun	PS2	
2007–2022	No More Heroes series	Travis Touchdown		
2009	Yakuza 3	Hasebe	PS3, PS4	
2009	Garnet Chronicle	Henson	PSP	
2010	Zangeki no Reginleiv	Sigmund	Wii	
2010	Danganronpa: Trigger Happy Havoc	Mondo Owada	PSP, iOS, Android, PSVita, PC, PS4	
2010	God Eater series	Soma Schicksal		
2010	.hack//Link	Orgel	PSP	
2010	The Legend of Heroes: Trails from Zero	Alex Dudley	PSP	
2011	Dissidia 012 Final Fantasy	Gilgamesh	PSP	
2011	The Legend of Heroes: Trails to Azure	Alex Dudley	PSP	
2012	Fate Holy Grail Hot Springs War	Lancer		
2012	Project X Zone	Soma Schicksal	3DS	
2013	Shining Ark	Adam	PSP	
2014	Hero Bank	Fukuta Kanemaru		
2014	Shining Dragon Refrain	Joachim	Nintendo Switch, PS3, PS4, Xbox One, PC	
2015	Yakuza 0	Yamagata	PS4, PS3, PC	
2015	Granblue Fantasy	Eustace	iOS, Android, Browser	
2015	Fate/Grand Order	Cú Chulainn (Prototype)	iOS, Android	
2016	World of Final Fantasy	Gilgamesh	PS4, Vita, PC	
2016	Onmyōji	Kuromujō	iOS, Android	
2017	Dissidia Final Fantasy Opera Omnia	Raijin, Wakka, Gilgamesh	iOS, Android	
2017	Akane-sasu Sekai de Kimi to Utau	Oda Nobunaga	iOS, Android	
2017	Fire Emblem Heroes	Astram, Helbindi	iOS, Android	
2017	Itadaki Street: Dragon Quest and Final Fantasy 30th Anniversary	Gilgamesh	PS Vita, PS4	
2018	The King of Fighters All Star	Toshiro Hijikata	Android, iOS	
2018	Graffiti Smash	Gatorium	iOS, Android	
2019	Another Eden	Jade	iOS, Android	
2020	The King of Fighters for Girls	Chang Koehan	Android, iOS	
2020	Ghost of Tsushima	Jin Sakai	PS4, PC	
2020	Arknights	Mountain	Android, iOS	
2021	Tales of Arise	Mahavar	PS5, Xbox X/S, PC	
2022	Stranger of Paradise: Final Fantasy Origin	Gilgamesh	PS4, PS5, Xbox One, Xbox X/S, PC	
2023	Octopath Traveler II	Partitio Yellowil	PS4, PS5, Nintendo Switch, PC	
2024	Persona 3 Reload	Shinjiro Aragaki	PC, PS4, PS5, Xbox One, Xbox X/S	
2024	Final Fantasy VII Rebirth	Gilgamesh	PS5, PC	
2025	Yakuza 0: Director's Cut	Yamagata	Nintendo Switch 2	

=== Drama CDs ===
List of voice performances in audio dramas
Series	Role	Notes	Source
Double Call			
D-Xhird	Schneider		
Gekkan Tokimeki Memorial 13			
Fate/Prototype: Christmas Murder Case	Lancer		
Megami Ibunroku Persona	Kido Reiji		
Persona 3 character drama CD vol 3			
Ragnarok the Animation	Iruga		
Tokimeki Memorial Love Song wo Kimi ni	Atsushi Kudou		
Maru Maru	Manun		

=== Television drama ===
Year	Series	Role	Notes	Source
2025	Unbound	Iwatoya Genpachi	Taiga drama	

=== Tokusatsu ===
List of voice performances in tokusatsu
Year	Series	Role	Notes	Source
1996	Ultraman World UltraSuper Ranking	Ultraseven		
2004	Tokusou Sentai Dekaranger	Igaroid, Gedoian Uniga	Eps. 7 – 8, 12, 25, 30, 34 (Igaroid), 49 – 50 (Gedonian Uniga)	
2004	Tokusou Sentai Dekaranger The Movie: Full Blast Action	Igaroid	Movie	
2005	Kamen Rider Hibiki	Narration		
2005	Ultraman Max	Ultraman Max		
2008	Engine Sentai Go-onger	Land Pollution Vice-Minister Hiramechimedes/Detaramedes/Urameshimedes	Eps. 15 – 23 (Hiramechimedes), 23 (Detaramedes), 24 (Urameshimedes)	
2008	Engine Sentai Go-onger It's a Seminar! Everyone GO-ON!!	Kokorootomedes	Original DVD	
2010	Kamen Rider × Kamen Rider × Kamen Rider The Movie: Cho-Den-O Trilogy	Piggies Imagin (Eldest Son) (Voiced by Kousuke Toriumi (Second Son), Tetsuya Kakihara (Third Son))	Movie	
2015	Tokusou Sentai Dekaranger 10 Years After	Igaroid	Movie	
2017	Uchuu Sentai Kyuranger	Garu/Ookami Blue	Eps. 1 – 6, 8 – 9, 12 – 14 16 – 18, 22 -,(Ookami Blue)	
2017	Kamen Rider × Super Sentai: Ultra Super Hero Taisen	Garu/Ookami Blue	Movie	
2017	Uchu Sentai Kyuranger the Movie: Gase Indaver Strikes Back	Garu/Ookami Blue	Movie	
2019	Lupinranger VS Patranger VS Kyuranger	Garu/Ookami Blue	V-Cinema	

=== Dubbing ===
List of dub performances in overseas productions
Series	Role	Voice dub for / Notes	Source
2 Days in the Valley	Lee Woods	James Spader	
2012	Adrian Helmsley	Chiwetel Ejiofor	
The Amateur	Charles Heller	Rami Malek	
Annie	William "Will" Stacks	Jamie Foxx	
Black Panther	W'Kabi	Daniel Kaluuya	
The Cuphead Show!	King Dice	Wayne Brady / Animation	
Emma's Chance	Kevin Chambers	Joey Lawrence	
Encanto	Bruno Madrigal	John Leguizamo / Animation	
Fantastic Beasts: The Secrets of Dumbledore	Aberforth Dumbledore	Richard Coyle	
The Flight Attendant	Alex Sokolov	Michiel Huisman	
Gods of Egypt	Thoth	Chadwick Boseman	
Guardians of the Galaxy Vol. 3	High Evolutionary	Chukwudi Iwuji	
Judas and the Black Messiah	Fred Hampton	Daniel Kaluuya	
Legends of Tomorrow	Rip Hunter	Arthur Darvill	
My Little Eye	Travis Patterson	Bradley Cooper	
No Time to Die	Lyutsifer Safin	Rami Malek	
One Piece	Roronoa Zoro	Mackenyu	
Oppenheimer	David L. Hill	Rami Malek	
The Penguin	Milos Grapa	James Madio	
Resident Evil: Afterlife	Angel Ortiz	Sergio Peris-Mencheta	
Snatch	Turkish	Jason Statham	
Snow White	Quigg	George Appleby	
The Thieves	Johnny	Derek Tsang	
Zoey's Extraordinary Playlist	Simon	John Clarence Stewart	
