= Ryuzou Ishino =

Japanese voice actor (born 1962)

- 石野 竜三
- Born: December 12, 1962 (age 63); Tokyo, Japan
- Occupation: Voice actor
- Years active: 1986–present
- Agent: 81 Produce

Ryuzou Ishino (石野 竜三, Ishino Ryūzō; born December 12, 1962) is a Japanese voice actor most notable for providing the voice for Chang Wufei in Gundam Wing and Chousokabe Motochika in Sengoku Basara.

== Voice roles ==
=== Anime ===
- .hack//Roots as Smile (ep 23)
- Ahiru no Quack
- Ai to Yuuki no Pig Girl Tonde Buurin as Male Student
- All Purpose Cultural Cat Girl Nuku Nuku (OAV) as student A (phase I)
- Amatsuki (Susutake)
- Ashita he Free Kick as announcer (ep 4); Carl Henderson; *Megalo (ep 9)
- Dragon Knight (OAV) as Lizard B
- Fuma no Kojirou: Fuma Hanran-hen (OAV) as Fûma A
- Gintama as Brother-in-law (Ep. 39)
- Golden Boy (OAV) as Animator
- Gundam Wing Endless Waltz Special Edition (movie) as Chang Wu-Fei
- GUNxSWORD as Zapiero Muttaaca
- Hyper Police as Tommy Fujioka
- Kikou Sennyo Rouran as Jimushi
- Kuma no Puutarou as Narration
- Kyouryuu Boukenki Jura Tripper as God
- Manmaru the Ninja Penguin as Ratsubi (ep14)
- MegaMan Maverick Hunter X: The Day of Sigma (OAV) as Penguin
- Midnight Horror School as Genie
- Mobile Suit Gundam Wing as Chang Wufei
- Mobile Suit Gundam Wing: Endless Waltz (OAV) as Chang Wu-Fei
- Mobile Suit Gundam Wing: Operation Meteor (OAV) as Chang Wufei
- Mobile Suit Victory Gundam as Gettle Deple
- Ningyo Hime Marina no Bouken as Chanshi
- Parappa the Rapper as King of Neighbouring Country (Ep. 5)
- Ranma 1/2 as Ukyo's Father / Mr. Kuonji
- Saban's Adventures of the Little Mermaid as Chauncey
- Sengoku Basara as Chousokabe Motochika
- Sengoku Basara Two as Chousokabe Motochika
- Space Oz no Bouken (as Hunter; Radio Voice
- Tanoshii Moomin Ikka
- Tanoshii Moomin ikka: Moomin Tani no Suisei (movie) as Skrat
- The Legend of Black Heaven as Suzuki (Raphael)
- The Twelve Kingdoms as Yuuzen
- Wedding Peach as Shinichi Kaji
- Ys II (OAV) as Townsperson B; Young Warrior
- Zoids/ZERO as McNair
- Zoids: Fuzors as Burton

=== Tokusatsu ===
- Juken Sentai Gekiranger (Confrontation Beast Toad-Fist Eruka (ep 19))
- Kamen Rider Kiva (Rat Fangire (ep 36 - 37))
- Samurai Sentai Shinkenger (Ayakashi Hitomidama (ep 9))
- Tensou Sentai Goseiger (Teckric Alien Mazuāta of Music (ep 4))
- Zyuden Sentai Kyoryuger (Debo Peshango (ep 2, 36))
- Shuriken Sentai Ninninger (Youkai Kasha (ep 3))
- Ultraman R/B (Alien Chibu (ep 18))

=== Drama CDs ===
- Abunai series 4: Abunai Campus Love
- Daisuki (Suzuki)

=== Games ===
- Chousokabe Motochika in Sengoku Basara 2
- Kurtz in Tales of Graces
- Sasuke in Ehrgeiz
- Chang Wufei in Another Century's Episode 2
- Luzzu in Final Fantasy X
- Tizzano and Cioccolata in GioGio's Bizarre Adventure
- Icy Penguigo in Mega Man: Maverick Hunter X

=== Dub ===
==== Live-action ====
- She-Wolf of London, Man 2

==== Animation ====
- Furball in Tiny Toon Adventures
- Bendy in Foster's Home for Imaginary Friends
- Abyo in Pucca
- Salty and Den in Thomas & Friends (Succeeded Salty from Naoki Tatsuta)
