= Sengoku Basara: Samurai Heroes =

2010 video game

Sengoku BASARA Samurai Heroes
- North American PlayStation 3 cover art
- Developer: Capcom
- Publisher: Capcom
- Director: Makoto Yamamoto
- Producer: Hiroyuki Kobayashi
- Designer: Mitsuru Endo
- Artists: Makoto Tsuchihayashi (character); Narumi Tauchi (background); Junichiro Ogawa (visual effects)
- Writer: Shino Okamura
- Composers: Kow Otani; Masahiro Aoki; Rei Kondoh; Masayoshi Ishi; Yasutaka Hatade; Sara Sakurai
- Series: Sengoku BASARA
- Engine: MT Framework Lite
- Platforms: PlayStation 3, Wii
- Release: Sengoku BASARA Samurai Heroes (PS3, Wii): JP: July 29, 2010; NA: October 12, 2010; AU: October 14, 2010; EU: October 15, 2010; Sengoku BASARA 3 Utage (PS3, Wii): JP: November 10, 2011
- Genre: Hack and slash
- Modes: Single-player, multiplayer

Sengoku BASARA Samurai Heroes, known in Japan as Sengoku BASARA 3, is a 2010 hack and slash, action video game developed and published by Capcom. It is the third major installment in the Sengoku BASARA game series and the second game in the series to be released worldwide. It was released for the PlayStation 3 and Wii in July 2010 in Japan and worldwide in October.

== Gameplay ==
Samurai Heroes is a "hack and slash" combat style that emphasizes large battlefields and an element of strategy. The strength of the controlled character allows for superhuman feats of destruction against multiple foes, and the battles revolve around defeating large numbers of enemies. Additionally, missions are completed (in general) by defeating "gate captains" and eventually a boss and/or mini-bosses. Samurai Heroes mixes up the gameplay by adding in other objectives, as well, such as guarding a castle or destroying an enemy's food reserves. The uniqueness of each character allows for different fighting styles, such as those which focus on hitting a large number of enemies versus those which focus on a few (excellent for killing boss characters). Combos can be easily performed, and characters have the ability to gain levels by completing stages, eventually unlocking skills and/or adding additional power to their existing ones. Weapon acquisition and customization is also an integral element of the game.

The difficulty levels were named differently in the Western versions of the game to make the game more difficult (with the Japanese Normal becoming Easy and Japanese Hard becoming Normal). However this doesn't affect the EXP and spoils of war received after finishing stages, unlike Devil Kings.

== Characters ==
Characters marked with (*) are unplayable NPCs (except for Takeda Shingen, who was only in cutscenes) in the original game that have become playable in its expansion, Sengoku BASARA 3 Utage
Bold denotes starter characters in the main game and Samurai Heroes
Matsunaga Hisahide (**) did appear in Sengoku BASARA 2 Heroes as an NPC but he makes his first playable appearance in Sengoku BASARA 3 Utage

SB	SB2	SB3 (SH)
**Date Masamune**	Maeda Keiji	**Tokugawa Ieyasu (older version)**
**Sanada Yukimura**	Chōsokabe Motochika	**Ishida Mitsunari**
Honda Tadakatsu	Mōri Motonari	Ōtani Yoshitsugu
Shimazu Yoshihiro	Oichi	**Saika Magoichi**
Oda Nobunaga	Fūma Kotarō	**Kuroda Kanbei**
Sarutobi Sasuke*	Katakura Kojūrō*	Tsuruhime
Uesugi Kenshin*	Hōjō Ujimasa*	Matsunaga Hisahide**
Kasuga*		Kobayakawa Hideaki*
Takeda Shingen*		Tenkai*
Maeda Toshiie*		Tachibana Muneshige*
Matsu*		Ōtomo Sōrin*
		Mogami Yoshiaki*

=== Regional Warlords ===
NPC characters that serve as bosses and/or mini-bosses with no role in the story, and aren't playable in any of the games (have made their first appearance in Samurai Heroes):

Nanbu Harumasa, Satake Yoshishige, Utsunomiya Hirotsuna, Anegakōji Yoritsuna, Amago Haruhisa, and Naoe Kanetsugu.

== Soundtrack ==
The opening theme is "Naked arms" by T.M.Revolution. The American version of the game uses the English version of "Naked Arms" as its opening. The ending theme is "Gyakkō" by Chiaki Ishikawa. The American and European versions of the game uses an instrumental track called "The Last Brave" by Rei Kondoh, due to licensing restrictions.

== Reception ==
Reception

Aggregate score
Aggregator	Score	
Aggregator	PS3	Wii
Metacritic	65/100	61/100

Review scores
Publication	Score	
Publication	PS3	Wii
1Up.com	9.1/10	9.1/10
Destructoid	7/10	N/A
Famitsu	34/40	33/40
GamePro	3.5/5	N/A
GameRevolution	B−	N/A
GameSpot	4.5/10	4.5/10
GameTrailers	5.5/10	N/A
GameZone	6/10	N/A
IGN	4.5/10	4.5/10
Nintendo Power	N/A	7/10
PlayStation: The Official Magazine	5/10	N/A
411Mania	8.2/10	N/A
Gaming Age	8.3/10	N/A
Metro	4/10	N/A
Multiplayer.it	N/A	7.8/10
Nintendojo	N/A	7.5/10
Play UK	7.6/10	N/A
PlayStation Universe	7.5/10	N/A
Vandal	N/A	8/10
Worth Playing	8.5/10	8.5/10

In North America, the game received "mixed or average" reviews on both platforms according to the review aggregation website Metacritic. In Japan, the game received "generally favorable" reviews. Japanese video game magazine, Famitsu, gave the PS3 version a score of 9/9/8/8 for a total of 34/40 and the Wii version a score of 9/8/8/8 for a total of 33/40.

Capcom announced later that the game had sold over 500,000 units in Japan by September 8, 2010, becoming the best-selling Sengoku BASARA game and bringing the total sold for the series to 2.1 million. The game was later re-released under the PlayStation 3 the Best label (which means it is a best-seller in Japan). The game sold a total of 292,519 units during its first week on sale in Japan (PS3: 242,698 units/Wii: 49,821 units) with the PS3 version being the top-selling game of the week and the Wii version being the fifth best-selling game of the week. This would be the highest debut for a Sengoku BASARA game so far. The game has sold a total of 610,818 units in Japan (PS3: 422,765 units/Wii: 188,053 units).
