= Sanada Ten Braves =

Fictional group of ninja

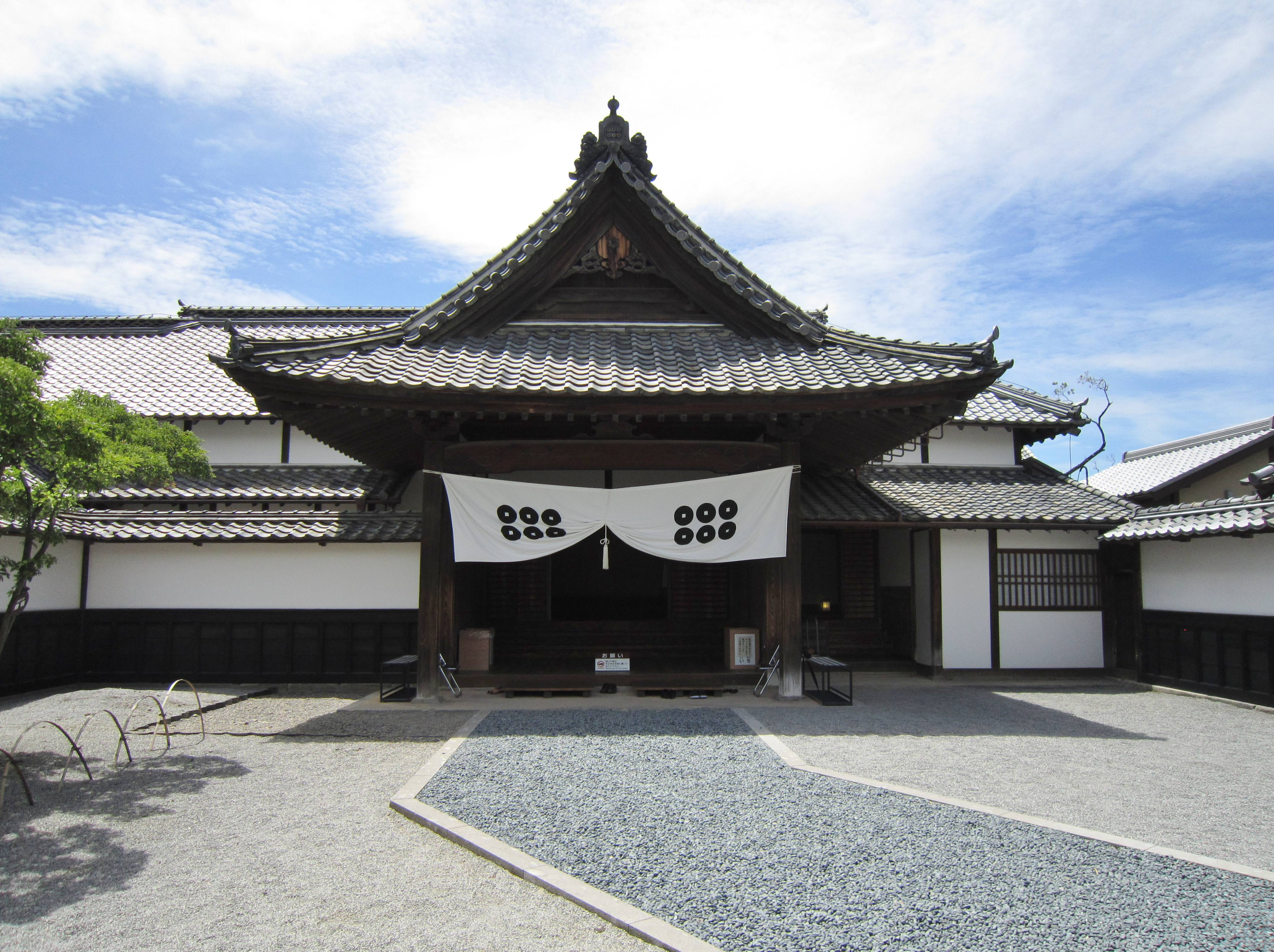
Former Sanada Residence.

The Sanada Ten Braves (真田十勇士, Sanada Jūyūshi; also known as the Ten Heroes of Sanada) are a fictional group of ninja that assisted the warlord Sanada Yukimura during the Warring States era of Japan; that is, the late Sengoku period and its immediate aftermath, also known as the Azuchi–Momoyama and the early Edo periods.

The Sanada story first became well known through Sanada Sandaiki, a novel published in the late Edo period. Later Tatsukawa Bunko published two novels in the Taishō period: Sarutobi Sasuke and The Sanada Ten Braves.

== Ten Braves ==
- Sarutobi Sasuke (猿飛 佐助) (possibly modelled after Kōzuki Sasuke (上月佐助))
- Kirigakure Saizō (霧隠 才蔵) (possibly modelled after Kirigakure Shikauemon (霧隠鹿右衛門))
- Miyoshi Seikai (三好 清海) (possibly modelled after Miyoshi Masayasu (三好政康))
- Miyoshi Isa (三好 伊三) (possibly modelled after Miyoshi Masakatsu (三好政勝))
- Anayama Kosuke (穴山 小助)
- Unno Rokurō (海野 六郎) (possibly modelled after Unno Rokurōbee (海野六郎兵衛))
- Kakei Jūzō (筧 十蔵) (possibly modelled after Kakei Jūbee (筧十兵衛))
- Nezu Jinpachi (根津 甚八) (possibly modelled after Nezu Koroku (禰津小六) and/or Azai Iyori (浅井井頼))
- Mochizuki Rokurō (望月 六郎) (possibly modelled after Mochizuki Uemon (望月宇右衛門)/Mochizuki Jinzaemon (望月甚左衛門)/Mochizuki Uhee (望月卯兵衛)/Mochizuki Usabuemon Yukitada (望月卯左衛門幸忠))
- Yuri Kamanosuke (由利 鎌之助)

== In popular culture ==
Of the Ten, Sarutobi Sasuke and Kirigakure Saizō are the only two that appear frequently in popular depiction. Outside of works that specifically deal with the Ten Braves, appearance of all ten members is relatively rare, and even then some members are frequently more-or-less generic filler characters. Sarutobi Sasuke is the name of a minor character in the Naruto manga and anime series, who is the father of Hiruzen Sarutobi and the progenitor of the Sarutobi clan. Further, members of the Swordsmen of the Mist of the Kirigakure- the Hidden Mist Village- are modeled after the Ten, such as Juzo Biwa and Jinpachi Munashi taking their namesakes from the Sanada Ten Braves

Sometimes modern day depictions have their genders change as well. In Tai Kato's 1963 jidaigeki musical film, Brave Records of the Sanada Clan, Kirigakure is a woman. There are hints that say Anayama Kosuke could be a female, and Miyoshi brothers were nyuudou (入道) monks.

=== Video game ===
Sanada Jūyūshi (真田十勇士) is a Japanese role-playing game released for the Famicom in 1988.

=== Brave 10 ===
In the Brave 10 (ブレイヴ・テン) manga by Kairi Shimotsuki, some members are replaced. Sanada Yukimura plans to create a unit with a number matching the number of fingers he has.

- Sarutobi Sasuke (猿飛 佐助): The leader of the group.
- Kirigakure Saizou (霧隠 才蔵): The main character who is new of the Juyushi. He is masterless and wanders without the desire to find a lord to serve. Originally an Iga ninja.
- Isanami: She takes place of Miyoshi Isa of the Nyuudou brothers. She is the adoptive sister of Miyoshi Seikai.
- Anastasia of the Glacier: She takes place of Anayama Kosuke. A childhood friend of Saizou.
- Unno Rokurou (海野 六郎): Yukimura's page, he stays by Sanada Yukimura's side almost all the time to personally protect him.
- Kakei Juzou (筧 十蔵): Portrayed as a hot-blooded middle-aged man.
- Yuri Kamanosuke (由利 鎌之助): Portrayed as a perverted assassin with bloodlust for Saizou.
- Miyoshi Seikai (三好 清海): Isanami's step-brother.
- Mochizuki Benmaru: Originally Mochizuki Rokurou (望月 六郎), he was renamed with Yukimura's middle name, to avoid confusion between himself and Unno Rokurou.
- Nezu Jinpachi (根津 甚八): Portrayed as a pirate.

=== In the Musou series ===
In Samurai Warriors 2, some of the ten are portrayed as bodyguards. They are Sarutobi Sasuke (as Ninja), Kirigakure Saizō, Mochizuki Rokurō (as Fire Ninja), Anayama Kosuke (as Samurai), Kakei Jūzō (as Musketeer), Miyoshi Seikai and Miyoshi Isa (as sumōtori).

In the series as a whole, Yukimura is constantly in the companionship of the character "Kunoichi," who is exactly as her name implies (a female ninja). For all intents and purposes she's something of a representative for the legendary group overall. The 3rd and 4th entries into the series did away with special bodyguards, and the Braves henceforth appear as generic officer NPC's who are always present in any campaign where Yukimura takes part.

In Samurai Warriors: Spirit of Sanada, Sarutobi Sasuke appears as a playable character under the name of "Sasuke".

=== In the Sengoku Basara series ===
In Sengoku Basara (戦国BASARA), Sarutobi Sasuke (猿飛 佐助) is portrayed as a loyal ninja serving the Takeda Clan (mainly Sanada Yukimura). In the Sengoku Basara anime second season, Sengoku Basara Two (戦国BASARA 弐, Sengoku BASARA Ni), three unnamed ninja who wear outfits with the Takeda crest similar to Sasuke's were seen in some episodes, possibly referring to the other members of the Brave Ten.

=== In Samurai Deeper Kyo ===
In the manga and anime series Samurai Deeper Kyo, they're introduced as the loyal servants who serve Sanada Yukimura.

- Sarutobi Sasuke (猿飛 佐助) is portrayed as the title of Sanada Juuyuushi's leader: the current Sasuke is a young boy who later joins the group long after the previous Sarutobi Sasuke left it.
- Kirigakure Saizou (霧隠 才蔵) is portrayed as the loyalist of Yukimura.
- Anayama Kosuke (穴山 小助) is portrayed as the female double of Yukimura to protect his safety.
- Miyoshi Isa (三好 伊, formerly Miyoshi Masakatsu 三好 政勝) and Miyoshi Seikai (三好 清海, formerly Miyoshi Masayasu 三好 政康) are portrayed as Nyuudou (入道) twin, bald and wear sunglasses.
- Nezu Jinpachi (根津 甚八) is portrayed as a close hate-love friend of Yuri.
- Unno Rokurou (海野 六郎) is portrayed as a double of Yukimura when he is away from home.
- Yuri Kamanosuke (由利 鎌之助) is portrayed as a female and the cook of the group.
- Kakei Juuzou (筧 十蔵) and Mochizuki Rokurou (望月 六郎) are portrayed to be Yukimura's loyal servants and fighting with him.

=== In Nioh ===
The Sanada Ten Brave appear as enemies in the Defiant Honor downloadable content for the 2017 action role-playing game, Nioh. In missions set during the Siege of Osaka, William ‘Anjin’ Adams confronts and defeats the braves before facing Sanada Yukimura himself.

=== In Ninja Sentai Kakuranger ===
In the 18th Super Sentai Series, Ninja Sentai Kakuranger, the Kakurangers are named after some Legendary Ninjas. 3 of them are named after 3 of the Sanada Ten Braves.

- NinjaRed: (Sarutobi) Sasuke
- NinjaYellow: (Miyoshi) Seikai
- NinjaBlue: (Kirigakure) Saizou
- NinjaWhite and NinjaBlack are named after 2 other Legendary Ninjas: Tsuruhime and Jiraiya, and Ninjaman is just a made-up name.
