= Nioh =

2017 video game

- Developers: Team Ninja; Kou Shibusawa
- Publisher: Koei Tecmo: WW: Sony Interactive Entertainment (PS4, PS5)
- Directors: Fumihiko Yasuda; Yosuke Hayashi
- Producer: Hisashi Koinuma
- Programmer: Yuta Yamazaki
- Artist: Hirohisa Kaneko
- Writers: Kazunori Taguchi; Masahiko Kochi; Makoto Shibata
- Composer: Yugo Kanno
- Platforms: PlayStation 4; Windows; PlayStation 5
- Release: PlayStation 4: NA: 7 February 2017; PAL: 8 February 2017; JP: 9 February 2017; Windows: WW: 7 November 2017; PlayStation 5: WW: 5 February 2021
- Genres: Action role-playing, hack and slash
- Modes: Single-player, multiplayer

Nioh (Note: Japanese: 仁王, Hepburn: Niō; lit. "Benevolent Kings") is a 2017 action role-playing game developed by Team Ninja and Kou Shibusawa and published by Koei Tecmo for the PlayStation 4. Sony Interactive Entertainment published the game outside Japan on PlayStation consoles. Nioh 2, a prequel to Nioh was released on PlayStation 4 in March 12, 2020. A port to Windows including all downloadable content was released the same year while a remastered version was released for PlayStation 5 on 5 February 2021.

Based on a fictionalized history of Japan and featuring both real-life albeit heavily-altered historical figures, and supernatural elements, the game takes during the year 1600 and follows William Adams, a rare samurai foreigner who pursues the sorcerer Edward Kelley while fighting a variety of yōkai creatures into the final battles of the Sengoku period, during Tokugawa Ieyasu's efforts to unify Japan. The gameplay revolves around navigating levels and defeating yōkai that have infested an area; combat revolves around stamina or "Ki" management and different sword stances that are strong or weak against different enemies.

Nioh began development in 2004 for PlayStation 3 as part of a multimedia project based on an unfinished Akira Kurosawa script. The project went through a turbulent and prolonged pre-production period, going through multiple revisions until its final version began development in 2014 for PlayStation 4. Development information was sporadic until 2015, when it was reintroduced to the public.

Alpha and beta demos were released during 2016, to both gauge public reaction to the title and make adjustments based on feedback. Initially scheduled for a 2016 release, the adjustments pushed the release into the following year. Upon release, Nioh received positive reviews, with praise going to the gameplay and graphics while the story was criticized as lacking or confusing. It reached high positions in sales charts, going on to ship over 3 million copies worldwide. Nioh received two sequels, Nioh 2 (2020), and Nioh 3 (2026).

== Gameplay ==
A battle in Nioh; William faces a human enemy, and is executing a Ki Pulse to replenish his Ki stamina meter.

Nioh is an action role-playing game set in Japan during the year 1600, with players taking the role of an Irish samurai named William. The player guides William on missions through enclosed environments fighting both human enemies and supernatural beings called yokai: missions are self-contained, hold alternate routes William can navigate, and selected from a menu rather than reached by navigating an open world. While navigating environments, William can find various collectables both in crates scattered through the environment and in other places within the environments such as fallen soldiers. These collectibles include Amrita, the game's experience points (EXP); gold, the in-game currency; weapons and armor, and consumable items such as bombs. Weapons and armor found in the environment can be taken to a blacksmith, who are able to buy it from William or can break it down into base material. Shrines scattered through levels act as checkpoints, allowing players to save progress, replenish health and raise William's experience level through accrued EXP: doing this respawns all normal enemies within an area. Skill points acquired in combat are assigned at shrines.

Fighting is fast-paced hack and slash combat (similar to previous Team Ninja works), with William being able to attack enemies and block their attacks in turn. William can run, dodge, and sprint with these and combat actions draining his Ki stamina bar. When his Ki has been depleted, William is left vulnerable to attack. If timed right, William is able to replenish lost Ki with an action called "Ki pulse". The Ki pulse grants status buffs onto William, and dispels patches of miasma generated by yokai and other supernatural enemies which rapidly saps Ki. Defeated enemies drop loot, which includes money and weapons. The speed at which William can move through levels depends on the weight of his equipped armor; the heavier it is, the faster his Ki will drain. If William dies, all the EXP acquired up to that point is left where he fell, and he must travel back to retrieve it, but if he dies again and therefore failing to reach it, the amount of EXP dropped is lost and the spirit animal is automatically recovered.

William has access to multiple types of melee weapons: these include single and dual swords, axes, polearms and kusarigama. In addition to melee weapons, William has access to ranged weapons such as a bow, a rifle, and a hand cannon. The more each weapon is used, the stronger and more effective it becomes. In combat, William can change between three Stances with melee weapons, with each stance having different effects; High Stance causes higher damage while lowering defense, Low Stance allows for quick attacks and better defense, while Middle Stance balances elements of the other two Stances. These Stances consume different amounts of Ki depending on their attack strength. William can summon Guardian Spirits, animals that combine his health and Ki into a single meter with added stat boosts such as increasing attack power or defense. Each Guardian Spirit boosts different stats, and can only be switched out at shrines. Guardian Spirits are lost when William dies, but they can be summoned to him at a shrine at the cost of his lost EXP. In addition to normal enemies, William can summon Revenants, hostile ghosts based on other fallen players, to battle and gain experience, money and items. A cooperative multiplayer allows for other players to be summoned to help in battles.

William's character growth is governed by EXP. Some statistical points can be assigned to William's character following the game's opening mission, and during the main game, stat points can be assigned to William's attributes, which range from increased physical strength to heightened speed. Stat points are split between three skill trees: "Samurai" for weapon skill trees for standard melee combat, "Ninja" for distance weapons such as shurikens and poisons, and "Onmyo" which link to the creation of talismans, consumable items that grant temporary stat boosts. If William finds and guides Kodama to the Shrines within each mission, he can purchase otherwise inaccessible bonus material such as items and weapons. Offerings of items can be made at the shrine in exchange for EXP. Additional buffs can be granted using Prestige Points, which are acquired by fulfilling certain tasks within levels such as dealing a certain amount of damage or killing a number of enemies with one weapon type.

== Synopsis ==
=== Setting and characters ===
Nioh is set in 1600 within a fictionalized dark fantasy version of the late Sengoku period, a time when the clans of Japan were at war prior to the unification under the Tokugawa shogunate and the beginning of the Edo period. Amidst the fighting and high death toll, yōkai have appeared and begun wreaking havoc across the land: major yōkai threats that appear in the game include Hinoenma, Jorōgumo, and a Yuki-onna born from the spirit of the wife of Oda Nobunaga following the Honnō-ji incident.

The game's main protagonist is William Adams (Ben Peel), a blond-haired Irishman who arrives in Japan in pursuit of an enemy. He crosses paths with Tokugawa Ieyasu (Masachika Ichimura) and his ninja servant Hattori Hanzō (Toshiyuki Morikawa), forming an alliance against both William's enemy and the yōkai infesting Japan. William is trained in combat by Yagyū Munetoshi, Hōzōin In'ei and Marume Nagayoshi. The main antagonist is Edward Kelley (Hiroyuki Kinoshita/Nicholas Boulton), a Westerner driving the conflict using his dark alchemical abilities under the order of John Dee (Timothy Watson), chief advisor to Queen Elizabeth I.

William crosses paths with numerous historical figures from the period: these include Ieyasu's allies Ii Naomasa (Jun Fukuyama) and Honda Tadakatsu (Tesshō Genda); daimyo Kuroda Yoshitaka (Yōhei Tadano) and his son Kuroda Nagamasa (Hiroshi Tsuchida); Ieyasu's main rival Ishida Mitsunari (Takahiro Sakurai) and his allies Shima Sakon (Keiji Fujiwara) and Ōtani Yoshitsugu (Kenyuu Horiuchi); Tachibana Ginchiyo (Shizuka Itō), head of the Tachibana clan, and her husband Muneshige (Eiji Hanawa); hostile mercenary Suzuki Magoichi (Yasuyuki Kase); Yasuke (Richie Campbell), a former favored vassal of Nobunaga; the Date clan including Date Masamune, Date Shigezane and Katakura Shigenaga; Sanada Yukimura, Sarutobi Sasuke and the Sanada Ten Braves; and Tenkai (Takayuki Sugō), a monk of the Tendai Buddhist sect and master manipulator of yin and yang magic. Original characters include Okatsu (Emi Takei), a female ninja in Hanzō's clan who holds a dislike and curiosity for William; and Fuku (Risa Shimizu), Tenkai's disciple.

=== Plot ===
The game opens with a narration by William describing Amrita, a mystical golden stone found in abundance in Japan that is sought by the government of Queen Elizabeth I to secure victory over Spain in the Anglo-Spanish War. William was one of those contracted by the queen to obtain Amrita, but afterward was imprisoned to keep the Amrita a secret. Held in the Tower of London in 1598, William breaks out with the help of his Spirit Guardian Saoirse, a water spirit born from the prayers of his village who saved him from death when he was a boy and prevents him from dying. William is confronted by Edward Kelley, who seeks Japan's Amrita. After trying to kill William, Kelley uses his Ouroboros spirit to steal Saoirse and transports himself to Japan with William in pursuit. Landing in Japan in 1600, he fights Oni that are ravaging the area, receiving aid from Hanzo Hattori to help find Kelley in exchange for fighting Oni. On one of his first missions, William is joined by a Nekomata, who tells him that the delicate balance between good and evil spirits has been disrupted by the past century of war in Japan. Possession by Nekomata allows him to understand Japanese.

William's work against the yōkai and saving key figures earns him Ieyasu's favour, while Mitsunari and his supporters align themselves with Kelley, in hopes that Mitsunari can create a land not wholly ruled by the strong. William, however, soon learns from Okatsu that Ieyasu sacrificed many of his family in a ruthless bid for power, with Okatsu being one of Ieyasu's illegitimate daughters who escaped by becoming a kunoichi. Kelley continues to plague William, including impersonating Tachibana Muneshige in an attempt to undermine Muneshige's wife Ginchiyo and resurrecting Oda Nobunaga's wife Princess Nō, as a yukionna. Kelley later drains an Amrita seal keeping evil spirits from ravaging Kyoto, with William barely stopping the spirits with help from Tenkai, his apprentice Fuku and the Nekomata, who sacrifices itself to give the others time to restore the seal. A later encounter sees William saving Okatsu from Kelley's control, then escaping with her when Ieyasu arrives and Kelley attacks, though William is initially disturbed that Ieyasu is willing to let Okatsu die. But upon realizing that Ieyasu is secretly pained by his ruthless decisions and sacrifices, William ultimately chooses to continue aiding him.

Events come to a head during the Battle of Sekigahara, where William faces off against first Ōtani Yoshitsugu—who uses Kelley's alchemy to empower his weakened body—and Shima Sakon. With Sakon defeated and Mitsunari's army routed by Ieyasu's forces, Kelley convinces Mitsunari to allow a ritual to offer the lives of his 300 men to animate a Gashadokuro that William defeats with help from Hattori and Tenkai. Ieyasu has William pursue Mitsunari, fighting him when Kelley transforms him into a yōkai-hybrid before returning him to human form, resulting in his capture by Ieyasu's forces and Tenkai being revealed as Akechi Mitsuhide. William pursues Kelley to a hideout where he disrupts his attempts to resurrect Nobunaga, Kelley flees while Nobunaga's close friend, Yasuke, duels William who defeats him. William heads to confront Kelley in Nobunaga's reconstructed castle, being subdued by Nobunaga's resurrected form before Nobunaga rebels against Kelley's control. Cornered and defeated, Kelley uses Ouroboros and Saoirse's energy to resurrect Yamata no Orochi. William defeats it, then learns from the dying Kelley that he was gathering Amrita to be sent back to England for his master John Dee. Having reclaimed Saoirse, William decides to disappear, allowing Hattori to avoid killing him on Ieyasu's orders and report him dead. This saddens Okatsu, who had begun to care for him and thought him different from other samurai. Following Mitsunari's execution, Ieyasu establishes his family's rule, setting the Edo period in motion as an era ruled by humans and hiding the truth of the yōkai and William's involvement. Hanzo lies to Ieyasu that William is dead, but as he and Okatsu leaves, Ieyasu is revealed to not only be aware of William's survival, but also secretly pleased with the outcome.

Three years later, William returns to England to confront Dee, also discovering that Edward Kelley was just one of several similar homunculi created by the latter. When William refuses Dee's offer of a partnership to guide England towards world conquest following the death of Elizabeth I, the chief advisor activates an elevator around his chamber, bringing William and himself into a secret tower where massive stores of Amrita are seen, Dee then absorbs energy from the crystals and transforms into a monstrous apparition known as Hundred Eyes. William defeats Dee, blinding him and thus neutering his magical abilities. Before leaving, William notices one of Hundred Eyes' magical orbs, and after receiving a vision of Hattori's death at the Siege of Osaka, decides to return to Japan.

The story is continued through downloadable content (DLC).

=== Dragon Of The North ===
The first DLC sees William returning to Japan where he is reunited with the resurrected Nekomata and learns from Ieyasu that Hanzo has gone missing while investigating warlord Date Masamune, who is secretly plotting a rebellion against the Tokugawa shogunate using an army of yōkai. William eventually rescues Hanzo from the Date forces while convincing Masamune to give up his plot, learning that Masamune was supplied Amrita by a Spanish spy named Maria, who escapes and offers her services to Toyotomi Hideyori, as a means to create more chaos in Japan to capture and use the Amrita to help the Spanish Empire regain its status as a world power after its crippling naval defeat to England.

=== Defiant Honor/Bloodshed's End ===
The second and third DLCs focus on William's hunt for Maria while helping the Tokugawa army deal with Sanada Yukimura during the Siege of Osaka. Defiant Honor takes place during the Winter campaign of the Siege, with William joining the battle alongside Masamune's forces and manages to infiltrate the Sanada-maru, eventually clashing blades with Yukimura himself. The battle ended, however, when Lady Chacha signals for a truce, having been convinced by Maria to use the Amrita after she failed to do the same with Yukimura. Bloodshed's End takes place during the Summer campaign, where William once again penetrates the Sanada-maru and defeats Hideyori, revealed to be a golem created from Amrita. Joined by Yukimura, who had his ninja vassal Sarutobi Sasuke assume his identity to fake his death during the Battle of Tennōji, William confronts Maria, who escapes, and Chacha as she transforms into a Nine-Tailed Fox demon in an attempt to kill them. Defeated and fatally wounded, Chacha regains her senses and apologizes to Yukimura, who remains by her side as Osaka Castle is consumed in flames as the Genna Era begins. As Maria remains a threat, William and Hanzo continue their hunt for her.

== Development ==
Nioh was developed by Team Ninja, a division of Koei Tecmo who had previously developed the Ninja Gaiden and Dead or Alive series. Team Ninja collaborated with fellow division Kou Shibusawa on the game, with the division's director and Koei founder Yoichi Erikawa writing the game's story and serving as co-producer. It is co-directed by Fumihiko Yasuda and Yosuke Hayashi, and co-produced by Hisashi Koinuma. The opening movie was directed by Shinji Higuchi, whose work included Shin Godzilla. The cinematic director for the game in general was Makoto Kamiya, who had previously supervised special effects for Death Note: Light Up the New World and the film version of I Am a Hero. The music was composed by Yugo Kanno, whose previous work included the Bayside Shakedown television film series and Japan Studio's Rain. The concept for the game was created by Shibusawa, who throughout development held a passionate vision for the project, which was in turn affecting its development.

=== Pre-production ===
Early promotional artwork for Nioh, romanized at the time as Ni-Oh. While the majority of its original elements were dropped, the setting and blonde-haired protagonist remained constant throughout the game's development.

The original version of Nioh was based on Oni, an unfinished script by Japanese film director Akira Kurosawa. According to Yasuda, this initial version "just crashed", and the team had to start all over again. The only elements to survive into the final version were the setting, the protagonist being a blond-haired foreigner, and the basic scenario concept: the narrative was otherwise changed into an original story based around the life of William Adams, an Englishman who became a samurai serving Ieyasu, and the events of the Sengoku period. While the original Kurosawa script was dropped in favor of an original story, artistic elements and battle movements were inspired by other Kurosawa pictures such as Yojimbo and Seven Samurai. The earliest draft of the new original story, created by the scenario writers of the Kessen series, gave the main character a leading yet unrecorded role in the events of the Sengoku period. This version was almost entirely scrapped.

Development on the title first began in 2004, when it was designed as a traditional Japanese role-playing game. It was being developed internally by Koei, four years prior to its 2008 merger with Tecmo. Development of this initial version ran from 2004 to 2008, lasting approximately four years before all work up to that point was scrapped. The role-playing version was scrapped by Shibusawa as it did not have enough fun elements within it. Production was rebooted and transferred to Omega Force, a division of Koei Tecmo, and shifted in genre to a fast-paced action game similar to their Dynasty Warriors series. This version was also scrapped, again due to Shibusawa being dissatisfied with the project's direction.

Team Ninja were first brought on in 2010 to help develop the action gameplay. It was at this stage that the title began evolving into an action role-playing game. When first presented with the project by the Koei staff, Team Ninja were skeptical about the project, unsure of its Western protagonist and setting, wondering if it was intended to be another Dynasty Warriors-styled game. Development was fully transferred to Team Ninja in 2012, with subsequent production lasting around four years. Up to this stage, only the basic concepts had been finalized, but when Team Ninja began full development the project solidified into being a full action title. Team Ninja's staff handled the gameplay aspects, while earlier staff from the original Koei team handled the scenario.

The alpha version was completed in August 2012. The team originally used the Ninja Gaiden engine, and Shibusawa was again concerned as he felt the game was turning into a Ninja Gaiden clone; a cited example was a scene where William was swinging an enemy with his bare hands. Yasuda was brought on board around this time. Hayashi struggled to make the gameplay work for a samurai character, and after half a year halted development again. When Koei Tecmo began producing games for the PlayStation 4, Shibusawa and Koei Tecmo CEO Hisashi Suganuma asked Hayashi to develop Nioh for that platform. Once details had been confirmed, this version took three years to develop. In total, the project was in development for between twelve and thirteen years. Shibusawa said fan expectations of the game in Japan were the only reason the game was not cancelled.

=== Scenario ===
Once production of the game was confirmed in 2014, Shibusawa said the team needed to reexamine the planned narrative. During early talks, Yasuda and Hayashi disagreed about what type of narrative they wanted, as Yasuda wanted to make something closer to Ninja Gaiden and Hayashi wanted a sombre experience based around war and death. The focus on death was drawn both from the setting and lore surrounding the Bushido samurai code. The game's opening in the Tower of London, which had a sinister reputation and folklore surrounding it, played into that theme. The overall theme of the game was the cycle of life and death, which was represented by both William and the enemy yokai. Yasuda was responsible for the yokai hunting aspects of the narrative, something Hayashi strongly opposed.

While a Western main character was settled upon for the final game, the initial concept had a native Samurai as the main protagonist in an original story. As the Koei staff had a history of developing historical titles such as Romance of the Three Kingdoms and Nobunaga's Ambition, they decided to base it on historical events. The Sengoku period was chosen as the game's setting due to it being a fertile period in Japanese history for an action title. Shibusawa was also fascinated by Adams' exploits, and the story came to be based on the major events in his life and iterations within Japan, then an isolated nation. They also added fantastic elements such as yokai.

A major influence on the story was James Clavell's 1975 novel Shōgun, which focused on a fictional English samurai based on the real-life Adams. The character of William was initially conceived as a Western pirate who became a samurai, then shifted into his current form. His general design changed little during production, but minor details were altered over the years. The game's singular focus on death contrasted sharply with Team Ninja's earlier works, which had also incorporated mild erotic elements. At the management's insistence, brighter or comedic elements such as the kodama were added.

A notable element of the story was the casting of high-profile actors in the lead roles, with many providing both voices and motion capture. The team wanted to bring the characters to life and fully express the historical aspects of the narrative. While the Koei staff had a strong background in games using historical figures, they had focused more on stylish presentation than subtle expressions during story sections. While the majority of the cast spoke Japanese, William spoke English. Initially this was to have been reversed, but the team thought it unrealistic even within the team's fantastical take on the setting, so they adjusted it. It also represented how William could communicate well with others despite a language barrier.

=== Game design ===
When Team Ninja were first involved with the project, they performed much trial and error testing to find a gameplay style best suited to the game's tone. When the project was given to Team Ninja, Shibusawa told them "to complete the mission of creating Nioh". The decision to give the project to Team Ninja was heavily influenced by the success of Dark Souls and other similar titles, dubbed by some as "Masocore" due to their difficult, yet rewarding action gameplay. Many at Team Ninja were fans of the Dark Souls series, and credited their surge in popularity with saving Nioh from possible cancellation and allowing progress for development of the game. Other influences included Bloodborne, Ninja Gaiden, Onimusha and Diablo. The main aim for the developers was to emulate the tough gameplay of both the Souls series and their earlier work on Ninja Gaiden while also making it accessible, fair and rewarding for players. Rather than outsourcing an engine or carrying an engine over from one of their other properties, the game engine for Nioh was built from scratch.

While the combat was extensively influenced by Souls games, Team Ninja's use of loot was more heavily influenced by the Diablo series, as they wanted combat to revolve around player skill rather than gear acquired through combat. The gameplay incorporated elements of samurai combat from popular culture. Historical accuracy when it came to weapons, armor and fighting styles dominated the gameplay design, which resulted in shields not being added as they were not used in combat by samurai. Each boss, from yokai to human enemies, had their own appearances and tactics. The yokai were all drawn from Japanese folklore, although their designs underwent slight alterations from their original forms. A recurring element for the yokai bosses was how they were designed: first they decided the initial form and impression, then the developers added an element which would catch players off guard: for instance, if a yokai appeared beautiful, they would become ugly at some point during the battle.

== Release ==
Nioh was first announced by original developer Koei in 2004 under its working title "Oni". In addition to the game, which was slated for a 2006 release, a feature film directed by Kurosawa's son Hisao Kurosawa would be produced alongside and inspire the game: the entire project's budget was estimated as being three billion yen. The movie tie-in was eventually cancelled in 2005 due to unspecified production problems, with the game becoming a standalone project. Nioh was first shown off in a trailer at the 2005 Electronic Entertainment Expo, where it was announced as a PlayStation 3 exclusive. At the time, the title was romanized as "Ni-Oh". Initially slated for a 2006 release, Nioh missed its announced release date, and no update on the game was issued until 2009, when Koei Tecmo stated that the title was still in development. Similar updates would be issued over the following six years. The game, now retitled slightly as Nioh, was reintroduced at the 2015 Tokyo Game Show as a PlayStation 4 exclusive, with a scheduled launch in Japan in 2016. It was later announced by Sony Interactive Entertainment for an international release at the PlayStation Experience event in December of that year, also in 2016. A manga based on the character and setting, called Nioh: The Golden Samurai (仁王～金色の侍～, Niō: Kin'iro no Samurai), was written by Yosuke Katayama and began serialization in Weekly Shōnen Magazine starting in May 2016.

Initially planned for October 2016, the game was delayed to make final adjustments based on player feedback from demos. The localization was a high priority for Koei Tecmo due to the worldwide release date. The game was announced for a worldwide release in February 2017. While Koei Tecmo published the game in Japan, Sony Interactive Entertainment handled publishing duties in mainland Asia, North America and Europe. This was to distribute the game to as wide an audience as possible. It was released in North America on 7 February, in Europe 8 February, and in Japan on 9 February. Two editions were created: the standard edition featuring the full game, and a Digital Deluxe Edition featuring an additional weapon pack, PS4 theme and season pass. Pre-order bonuses were additional costumes, based respectively on Japanese temple guardian statues and the samurai Sanada Yukimura. The game was also among those that supported the PlayStation 4 Pro model, with graphical enhancements enabling a smooth framerate.

=== Merchandise ===
A manga based on the character and setting, called Nioh: The Golden Samurai (仁王～金色の侍～, Niō: Kin'iro no Samurai), was written by Yosuke Katayama and began serialization in Weekly Shōnen Magazine starting in May 2016. The manga ran for twelve issues until May 2017. It was collected into three tankōbon released between February and May 2017 by Kodansha. An official soundtrack, featuring all 45 pieces of music from the game, was released in Japan on 15 February. An official art book, Nioh & Nioh 2 Official Artworks, was published in Japan by Kadokawa in June 2020, with an English edition by Udon Entertainment following in February 2023.

=== Demos ===
A demo version of the game, dubbed the "alpha demo", was released on PlayStation Network (PSN) on 26 April 2016. The demo was available until 5 May. Completing the demo unlocked access to a free downloadable content (DLC) pack dubbed "Mark of the Conqueror". This demo was released so Team Ninja could receive feedback from a future online survey to improve the game's mechanics. The demo was downloaded by 850,000 people worldwide, and feedback was positive overall aside from recurring complaints about its lack of tutorials, high difficulty and awkward control scheme. Based on this, the team made a number of changes and tweaks to the gameplay. A second "beta" demo released from 23 August to 6 September. It featured new stages, additional weapons and revamped gameplay based on the feedback from the alpha demo. Like the alpha demo, downloading the beta demo gave free access to DLC content, this time a pack dubbed "Mark of the Warrior" alongside the original "Mark of the Conqueror" pack. They again undertook a survey of players, and made numerous adjustments and additions to the game based on this feedback. The game's delay from 2016 to 2017 was caused by these adjustments. A third demo, called "Last Chance Trial", was made available from 20 to 23 January in North America and Europe. It gave access to both prior DLC and a final reward for the full game.

Producer Fumihiko Yasuda, at a presentation at Tokyo Game Show 2018, later attributed Nioh's success to the "demo strategy", saying that aside from getting feedback from users, the demos also had the aim of showing players they were being listened to, "which they hoped would result in players being more supporting of the game".

== Reception ==
Reception

Aggregate scores
Aggregator	Score
Metacritic	PS4: 88/100; PC: 84/100
OpenCritic	95% recommend

Review scores
Publication	Score
Destructoid	9/10
Electronic Gaming Monthly	9/10
Eurogamer	Recommended
Famitsu	36/40
Game Informer	9/10
GameRevolution	4.5/5
GameSpot	9/10
GamesRadar+	4/5
IGN	9.6/10
Polygon	8/10
The Daily Telegraph	5/5
New York Daily News	5/5

Nioh received "generally favorable" reviews from critics, according to review aggregator website Metacritic. Most critics praised the combat, difficulty, setting, use of Japanese folklore, and aesthetics as high points, as well as giving players the option to choose different graphical modes for the PS4 version; while the game's story and inventory management were met with some criticism. Eurogamer ranked the game 35th on their list of the "Top 50 Games of 2017", while Polygon ranked it 42nd on their list of the 50 best games of 2017. The game was nominated for "Best PS4 Game" in Destructoid's Game of the Year Awards 2017, and for "Best PlayStation 4 Game" and "Best RPG" in IGN's Best of 2017 Awards. Nioh was later one of three games invited to the Global Game Business Summit at Tokyo Game Show 2018 as an example of a game that succeeded globally.

In a review of Nioh in Black Gate, Matt Drought said "I found Nioh to be a deeply engaging game that kept me coming back for the fun combat mechanics and to see the incredible enemies that inhabited this world."

=== Sales ===
Nioh opened at number 2 in the UK sales charts. Retailers Amazon and Walmart sold all their stock of Nioh within the first week of release. It sold 75,477 copies in its first week in Japan, entering the charts at number 2. On 24 February 2017 Koei Tecmo and Team Ninja announced that Nioh had shipped over one million units worldwide within its first two weeks of sale. The numbers included retail shipments and digital sales. By February 2020, the game had shipped over three million copies worldwide. In October 2022, the sales of both Nioh and Nioh 2 had exceeded seven million units worldwide. As of May 2025, the Nioh series — including both Nioh and Nioh 2 — has surpassed 8 million units sold worldwide.

=== Accolades ===
Year	Award	Category	Result	Ref
2017	Japan Game Awards	Award for Excellence	Won	
2017	The Independent Game Developers' Association Awards	Action and Adventure Game	Nominated	
2017	Golden Joystick Awards	PlayStation Game of the Year	Nominated	
2017	The Game Awards 2017	Best Action Game	Nominated	
2018	Famitsu Awards	Rookie Award	Won	

== Sequels ==
Nioh 2, a prequel to Nioh, was released for PlayStation 4 in March 2020.

A third game in the series, Nioh 3, was released in February 2026. A limited-time alpha demo for PlayStation 5 was available from June 4 2025 to June 18 2025.
