= Katakura Kojūrō =

Hereditary name of the Katakura clan heads

Katakura Kojūrō (片倉 小十郎) was the common name of the head of the Japanese Katakura clan, who served as senior retainers to the Date clan. Following the Date clan's move into Sendai han, they were granted holdings at Shiroishi Castle (12,000 koku in total), which they held through the start of the Meiji Era. A chronologically arranged list of the generations of Edo-era Katakura Kojūrō (listed by their formal name) follows:

== Edo-era Katakura family heads ==
1. Kagetsuna (1557–1615)
2. Shigenaga (1585–1659)
3. Kagenaga (1630–1681)
4. Muranaga (1667–1691)
5. Murayasu (1683-?)
6. Muranobu
7. Murasada (1676–1744)
8. Murakiyo
9. Muratsune (1757–1822)
10. Kagesada
11. Munekage
12. Kuninori (1818–1886)
13. Kagenori (1838–1902)
14. Kagemitsu

== Katakura family heads since 1868 ==
1. Kenkichi
2. Nobumitsu
3. Shigenobu

Kagetsuna, the first Katakura Kojūrō, was arguably the most famous, having served alongside Date Masamune. The clan came to prominence yet again in the Boshin War, when Shiroishi Castle was used as the headquarters of the Ouetsu Reppan Domei. After the war, the 12th Kojūrō, Katakura Kuninori, sold the castle and relocated to Hokkaidō. The castle was then given to the Nanbu clan of Morioka, before the domain system was finally ended in the early 1870s. The current head of the family, Shigenobu (who would have been the 17th Kojūrō), is the chief priest of Aoba Shrine, in Sendai.

== Katakura Kojūrō in fiction ==
In the Sony PlayStation Video Game Sengoku Basara and the anime adaptation of it he was depicted as Masamune Date's loyal right-hand and right-eye man. He was using wakizashi and katana as his main weapon.
