= Katakura Kuninori =

Katakura Kuninori (片倉邦憲) (1818–1886) was a Japanese samurai of the Edo period. A senior retainer of the Sendai domain. Kuninori was the twelfth Katakura Kojūrō, and saw action under Sendai command in the Boshin War. During the war, his castle of Shiroishi became the command post for Sendai forces, as well as the administrative center of the Ouetsu Reppan Domei. His father was Katakura Munekage. His wife was Aihime, Date Munehira's daughter and his son was Katakura Kagenori.

Preceded by Katakura Munekage	Shiroishi-Katakura family head 1864-1876	Succeeded by Katakura Kagenori
