= Kagenori =

- Gender: Male

Origin
- Origin: Japanese
- Meaning: Different meanings depending on the kanji used

Kagenori (written: 景範 or 景憲) is a masculine Japanese given name. Notable people with the name include:

- Katakura Kagenori (片倉 景範; 1838–1902), Japanese samurai
- Nire Kagenori (仁礼 景範; 1831–1900), Imperial Japanese Navy admiral
- Obata Kagenori (小幡 景憲; 1572–1663), Japanese samurai
- Kagenori Ueno (上野 景範; 1845–1888), Japanese diplomat
