= Chikurin-in =

Wife of Sanada Yukimura

- 竹林院
- Born: 1579/80
- Died: June 27, 1649 (aged 69–70); Kyoto, Kyoto Prefecture
- Other names: Takehime (竹姫); Akihime (安岐姫); Riyohime (利世姫); Keihime (けいひめ)
- Spouse: Sanada Yukimura
- Father: Ōtani Yoshitsugu
- Relatives: Toyotomi Hideyoshi (adopted father); Sanada Masayuki (father-in-law); Sanada Nobuyuki (brother-in-law); Komatsuhime (sister-in-law)
- Family: Ōtani clan Toyotomi clan Sanada clan

Chikurin-in (竹林院; 1579/80 – June 27, 1649) was a Japanese noble lady of the late Azuchi-Momoyama through early Edo period. She was Ōtani Yoshitsugu's daughter, then she was adopted by Toyotomi Hideyoshi, before marrying Sanada Yukimura (Nobushige). She is described as having been very beautiful. They had two or three sons and four daughters.

== Life ==
Chikurin-in was known in her childhood as Takehime (竹姫). She was also known as Riyohime (利世姫) and Akihime (安岐姫). In 1594, she married Sanada Yukimura, the second son of Sanada Masayuki, daimyō of Ueda. It was a political marriage suggested by Hideyoshi to ensure an alliance between the Toyotomi (and the Ōtani) and the Sanada.

After Hideyoshi's death (1598), Japan was divided in two. Yukimura, Yoshitsugu and Masayuki (Chikurin-in's father-in-law) joined the western coalition of Ishida Mitsunari, while Yukimura's older brother, Sanada Nobuyuki, joined the eastern coalition of Tokugawa Ieyasu.

After the Battle of Sekigahara, with Ieyasu's victory, Yukimura and Masayuki were exiled to Mt. Koya in the Kii Peninsula. Chikurin-in followed her husband. In exile, they had two or three sons and some daughters. It is said that life in Kudoyama was difficult so, according to the tradition, she is supposed to have devised the Sanadahimo, that applied Tsumugi technology. She has supported the livelihood of her family by selling it.

In 1615, during the Osaka Campaign, Yukimura and his family escaped from the exile to join in the Toyotomi's forces. But, in the Summer Siege, Yukimura and his first son, Yukimasa, were killed.

Chikurin-in and her daughter Akuri were captured by Asano Nagaakira's troops and handed over to the Tokugawa, but both were spared and Chikurin-in became a nun. Her name as a nun was Chikurin-inden-baikei-eishun-daishi (竹林院殿梅渓永春大姉).

Chikurin-in went, in the first place, at the service of the Asano clan, in the second place, to Kyoto with one of her daughters. She died there the June 27, 1649.

== Family ==
- Father: Ōtani Yoshitsugu (1558–1600)
- Adopted father: Toyotomi Hideyoshi (1537–1598)
- Siblings:
  - Ōtani Yoshiharu (1581–1615)
  - Kinoshita Yoritsugu (?–1600)
- Spouse: Sanada Yukimura (m.1594-1615)
- Children:
  - Sanada Daisuke (真田 大助)(1600–1615). Yukimura's and Chikurin-in's eldest son. Born in exile on Mount Kudo. He was born around 1600–1602. He fought with his father in the Osaka Winter Battle to defend the Sanada Maru fortress. When Osaka castle fell, Yukimasa committed seppuku with Toyotomi Hideyori. He was also known as "Sanada Yukimasa" (真田 幸昌).
  - Oume (阿梅) (1604–1681). Yukimura and Chikurin-in's daughter, born on Mount Kudo. After the fall of Osaka castle, she married Katakura Shigenaga, son of Katakura Kagetsuna. Thanks to Oume, the surviving members of the Sanada clan and all of their retainers were able to find refuge in the Katakura clan. The Katakura crest was even changed to show the 6 coin symbol of the Sanada.
  - Akuri (あくり) (dates unknown). Yukimura and Chikurin-in's daughter. Akuri was adopted by Takigawa Kazuatsu, a Tokugawa vassal, after the fall of Osaka castle. Yukimura's sister was married to Kazuatsu. Akuri married Gamou Genzaemon.
  - Oshobu (阿菖蒲) (160? – 1635). Oshobu was Yukimura and Chikurin-in's daughter. Born on Mount Kudo. She was adopted by Katakura Shigenaga and married to Tamura Sadahiro, a retainer of Date Masamune.
  - Okane (おかね) (dates unknown) Yukimura and Chikurin-in's daughter. Born on Mount Kudo. She married Ishikawa Sadakiyo. It's said that Sadakiyo changed his name to Sourin, moved to Kyoto and became a master of the tea ceremony. Chikurin-in came to live with Okane after losing her husband. Sourin and Okane had a memorial built for Yukimura and Chikurin-in in Kyoto.
  - Sanada Daihachi (真田 大八) (1612–1670). Yukimura and Chikurin-in's second son. He was born on Mount Kudo. He was adopted by Katakura Shigenaga, and became "Katakura Morinobu" (片倉 守信). However, the Sanada name was restored to his line generations later.
  - Sanada Yukichika (真田 之親) (1615–1670). He was born shortly after his father's death, to Chikurin-in. He is not mentioned in historical records, and appears only in folk tales. He is also known as "Sanada Gonzaemon".

== See also ==
- Sanada Taiheiki a Japanese drama
- Sanada Maru a Japanese drama
- 真田太平記_(テレビドラマ) (Riyo is also Chikurin-in's name in Sanada Taiheiki)
