= Katakura Kenkichi =

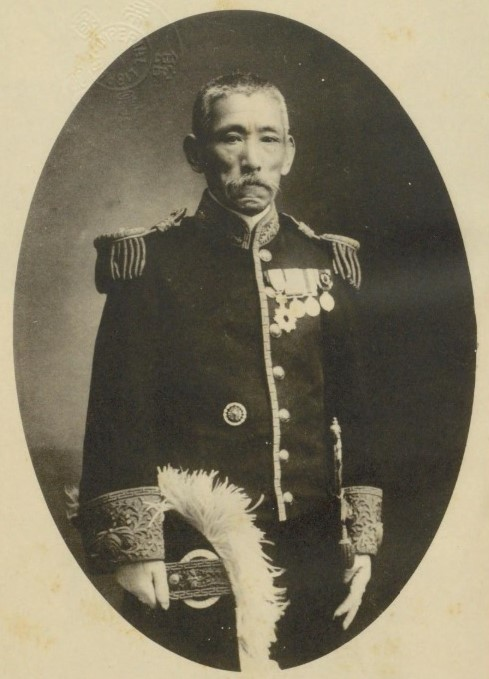

Katakura Kenkichi (片倉健吉) (??-??) was a Japanese nobleman of the Meiji era. Kenkichi would have been the fifteenth Katakura Kojūrō. Kenkichi held the title of baron and served as the chief priest of Aoba Shrine, in Sendai.

== Family ==
- Father: Date Munemichi (1821–1899)
- Foster Father: Katakura Kagemitsu
- Wife: Katakura Mitsuko
- Son: Katakura Nobumitsu

Preceded by Katakura Kagemitsu	Shiroishi-Katakura family head ??-??	Succeeded by Katakura Nobumitsu
