= Katakura Shigenaga =

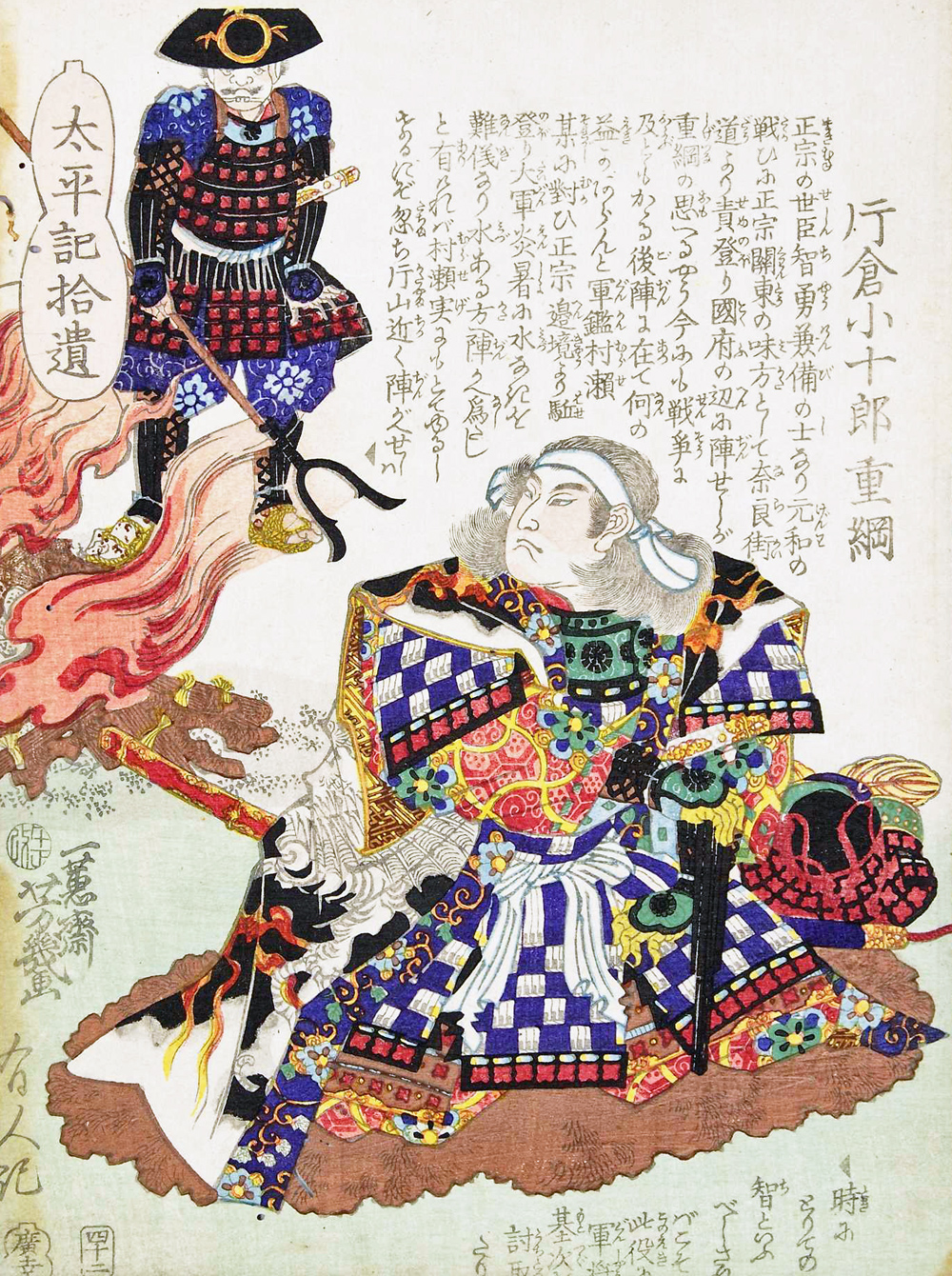
Katakura Shigenaga

Katakura Shigenaga (片倉 重長; 1585 – May 16, 1659) was a Japanese samurai of the Azuchi-Momoyama period through early Edo period. The son of Katakura Kagetsuna, Shigenaga was the second man to bear the common name Kojūrō. His name was originally Shigetsuna; however, to avoid conflict with the fourth shōgun Ietsuna's name, he changed it to Shigenaga.

In 1614, he took part in the Osaka Campaign, fighting Gotō Matabei at Dōmyōji Temple.

Following the Osaka Campaign, Shigenaga married a daughter of Sanada Yukimura and his wife, Chikurin-in (Ōtani Yoshitsugu's daughter and adopted daughter of Toyotomi Hideyoshi), and adopted their second son, Sanada Daihachi, later known as "Katakura Heinosuke Morinobu". He also assisted many of the masterless former Sanada retainers.

He was succeeded by his maternal grandson also adopted son, Kagenaga.

== Family ==
- Father: Katakura Kagetsuna
- Mother: Yanouchi Shigesada's daughter
- Wives:
  - Haryu Aya
  - Sanada Ume (1604-1681)
- Daughter: Kisa married Matsumae Yasuhiro
- Adopted Sons:
  - (Matsumae) Katakura Kagenaga (2nd)
  - Katakura (Sanada) Morinobu (1612-1670)
  - Katakura (Moniwa) Nobuyuki

== Notes ==
Preceded by Katakura Kagetsuna	Shiroishi-Katakura family head ??-??	Succeeded by Katakura Kagenaga
