= Katakura Nobumitsu =

Katakura Nobumitsu (片倉 信光; ? – ?) was a Japanese scholar of the early to mid 20th century. A direct descendant of the famed Katakura Kagetsuna, Nobumitsu was a scholar of regional history, focusing on Sendai. Nobumitsu would have been the sixteenth Katakura Kojūrō.

Preceded by Katakura Kenkichi	Shiroishi-Katakura family head ??-??	Succeeded by Katakura Shigenobu
