= Sanada Yukimura (Sengoku Basara) =

- Sengoku Basara character
- Sanada Yukimura's character portrait as seen in Sengoku BASARA 4, and Sengoku BASARA 4 Sumeragi.
- First game: Devil Kings (2005)
- Designed by: Makoto Tsuchibayashi
- Voiced by: EN: Andrew Francis (Devil Kings); EN: Johnny Yong Bosch (Other works); JP: Sōichirō Hoshi

Sanada Yukimura (Japanese: 真田 幸村) is a character from Capcom's Sengoku Basara video game franchise. He was first introduced in the 2005 hack and slash video game Devil Kings but was renamed "Scorpio" for the North American and European versions. A young samurai serving the Takeda clan, Sanada Yukimura, fights in the Sengoku period to help his clan unify Japan. While the first four games involve his growth as a samurai and deal with him taking over leadership, the spin-off game Sengoku Basara Sanada Yukimura-Den follows the character's backstory. He has also appeared in the series' anime, manga, stage play, and drama CD adaptations.

Capcom created the character based on the historical figure of the same name, after finding out he was well known enough to be portrayed as a video game protagonist. Across the series, Yukimura's characterization has slightly changed because of the different problems he faces, but Capcom decided to keep his hotblooded attitude as a lot of people like it. Sōichirō Hoshi voices Yukimura in the Japanese versions, while in English, Andrew Francis voiced him for Devil Kings with Johnny Yong Bosch handling his other appearances.

Yukimura has been a popular character in Japan inspiring a tour that led fans to learn more about the historical figure. He also finished third in a character poll of the best Sengoku Basara characters. Critical reception to the character has been generally positive. Writers enjoyed how his characterization balanced that of fellow protagonist Date Masamune as well as his growth in the anime. Bosch's voice acting also received positive responses.

== Creation and development ==
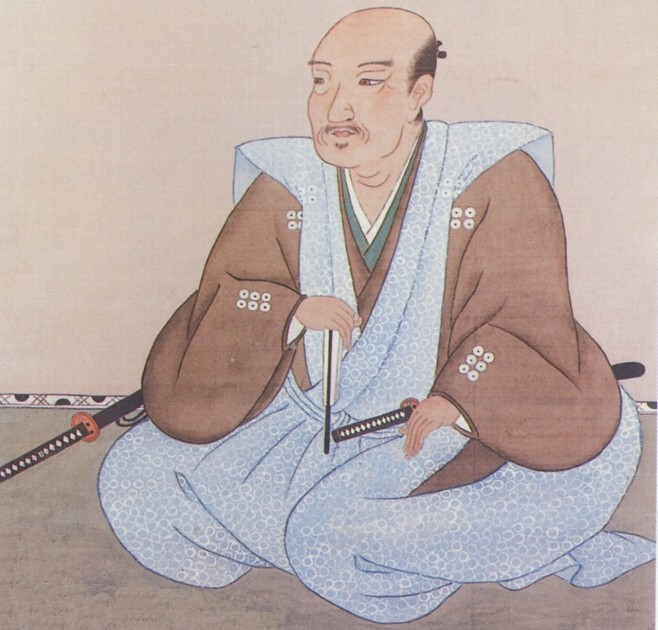
The character was loosely based on the real Sanada Yukimura.

While developing Sengoku Basara, Capcom researched important figures from Japan's Sengoku period. The staff discovered that Date Masamune and Sanada Yukimura were highly popular in this period and decided to use them as protagonists. During their research they found the original Yukimura worked for the Takeda clan, which used the color red. The staff decided to use this as the character's main color, which in turn helped to contrast him with Masamune's blue colors. Yukimura had used a spear, but the staff decided it would make him more interesting if the video game character wielded two. To provide contrast Yukimura was given modern clothing and Masamune had armor more suitable for the Sengoku period. The character designer was pleased with this result. Yukimura's links with Shimazu Yoshihiro in Sengoku Basara 3 and the anime are deliberate, a reference to a real member of the Shimazu clan reportedly naming him Nippon Ichi No Tsuwamono (The Number One Soldier In Japan) out of respect.

The director created a rivalry between Yukimura and Masamune because he wanted to contrast their characters. While Masamune was given a calm personality, Yukimura was made hotblooded. In further analyzing them, Makoto Yamamoto felt that Masamune originally acts more mature, he is more like Yukimura when both are fighting. Their personalities then fitted each other to form a rivalry. Yamamoto compared the rivalry between the two protagonists to that of sportsmen as both Yukimura and Masamune enjoy fighting. Sengoku Basara 4 did not have much interaction between the two characters, but the updated version was given a scenario where they interact. Another relationship important to Yukimura is the Takeda clan ninja, Sarutobi Sasuke. While a ninja is meant to be disposable, Yukimura and Sasuke instead befriended each other to the point where they consider themselves brothers. Inspired by the Sengoku Basara 4 Bontenmaru-hen prequel manga, the director wanted Yukimura to be featured more in Sengoku Basara 4's story.

Capcom addressed the concern that Yukimura's storyline in the third game had him as a more depressed person in contrast to previous entries in the franchise where he acted happier. As a result, for Sengoku Basara 4, the team made him his original straightforward, hot-blooded self after getting over those heavy experiences. However, they gave him a smaller role as the staff wanted Sengoku Basara 4 to focus more on Ishida Mitsunari. For the spin-off game centered around Yukimura, the staff redesigned the main duo as they looked as children. New gameplay features reflected their young age. Producer Hiroyuki Kobayashi emphasized the game focuses mostly on Yukimura, making it more realistic and historical than previous games due to the addition of his relatives. However, he also said Masamune's fans would not be disappointed because he is also playable.

Sōichirō Hoshi voices Yukimura in the Japanese version. In Devil Kings, Andrew Francis voiced him, while Johnny Yong Bosch replaced him for Sengoku Basara Samurai Heroes and the anime adaptations. Both Hoshi and actor Kei Hosogai have said they really like the character of Yukimura.

== Appearances ==
=== In Sengoku Basara video games ===
Sanada Yukimura debuted in the 2005 game Sengoku Basara; the westernized version was titled Devil Kings. For the westernized version, he was given the name "Scorpio". A young samurai serving Takeda Shingen, Yukimura fights in battles across Japan to allow his lord to unify the land. He is sometimes seen having arguments with his lord. They bond by simply yelling at each other during lectures and later through punches. In the game, Yukimura meets samurai Date Masamune and they become friendly rivals. However, their biggest threat is Oda Nobunaga.

Yukimura returns in Sengoku Basara 2 once again serving the Takeda clan and is opposed by Toyotomi Hideyoshi who seeks to conquer all of Japan under his forces. In Sengoku Basara 3, Shingen is ill, which depresses Yukimura. However, he decides to lead the Takeda clan in place of his lord. In one of Yukimura's endings, Shingen recovers and looks over a mountain to see Yukimura once again facing his rival, Masamune.

In Sengoku Basara 4, Yukimura fights for the Takeda clan once again. However, he has a smaller role in the story since the game focuses a little more on Ishida Mitsunari. The spin-off game, Sengoku Basara Sanada Yukimura-Den, centers around his past while also being more historically accurate than previous titles. The second son of Masayuki, head of the Sanada family, he appears as a young samurai with a strong desire to support the Takeda clan. Takeda Katsuyori, Shingen's son and new leader of the Takeda clan, is captured by the "Demon King of Owari", Oda Nobunaga, and is on the verge of death. To rescue his lord, Yukimura fights against the Oda clan with the rest of the Takeda clan together with his father, Sanada Masayuki, and older brother, Sanada Nobuyuki.

=== Adaptations ===
Outside the games, Yukimura is present in the anime adaptation by Production I.G. In the first season, Yukimura meets Masamune and both join forces to defeat Nobunaga. By the beginning of the second season, Yukimura has a duel with Masamune but loses the fight. Nevertheless, the appearance of Hideyoshi causes him to lead the Takeda clan forces to stop his plans to conquer Japan. Yukimura's mistakes and the enemies' forces cause him to lose multiple lives, but he manages to defeat one of the main enemies in the finale. In the film finale Sengoku Basara: The Last Party, Yukimura succeeds Shingen after deciding to support Tokugawa Ieyasu's plan to end the wars. In the climax, he joins his rivals to stop the revived Nobunaga. In the ending he engages in battle with Masamune once again.

A new anime based on the hit video game, Sengoku Basara: Samurai Heroes has Yukimura dealing with his lack of self-esteem as he does not consider himself worthy to lead the Takeda clan. He also appears in the spin-off anime, Gakuen Basara, as a high school student. A manga adaptation of the second game was created by Yak Haibara with Yukimura being one of the three main protagonists. He is also a present in the novelization of Sengoku Basara 3. Yukimura is portrayed by Kōhei Takeda in a live-action television show of the game series titled, Sengoku Basara: Moonlight Party. In a Sengoku Basara stage play that made a crossover with the series Devil May Cry, Ryūnosuke Matsumura played Yukimura.

== Cultural impact ==
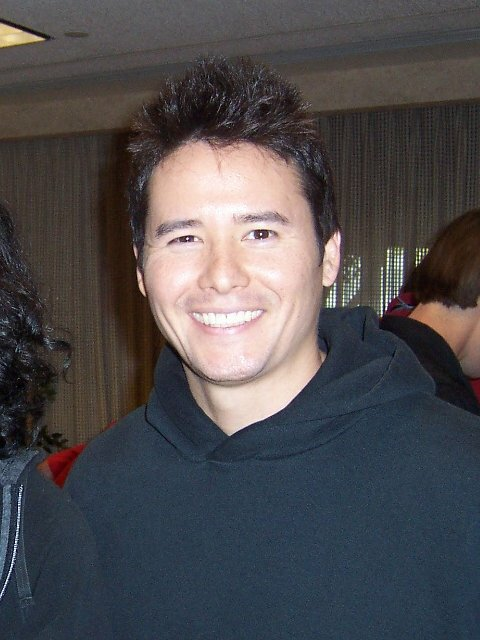
Johnny Yong Bosch's voice acting as Yukimura received positive response by critics.

Merchandising based around him has also been released, including large action figures of Yukimura and Masamune from Destructoid. In a poll to select the best characters from the series, Yukimura took the third spot, behind Mitsunari and Masamune. Critical response to Yukimura's characterization and role in the Sengoku Basara franchise has been generally positive. Gamereactor regarded him as a "standard hero" as he found him a normal character in contrast to others like Masamune who have cooler personalities. Japanator liked Yukimura's relationship with Masamune despite the irony that their historical figures never met. While liking the English dub, the reviewer lamented the fact the video games lacked Japanese voice options prevented fans "from indulging Masamune's penchant for random Engrish, dampening the enjoyment somewhat." Game Revolution stated that they found Masamune and Yukimura to be unique characters in the franchise whose physical looks would amaze players. Kotaku regarded him as one of the most attractive men in the cast, commenting that he wears an open jacket that shows his abs (six-pack) in most of his appearances which expanded his popularity. Noting the series' cast looked like characters from shōnen manga and anime, the same site noted that Yukimura had a few similarities with his historical figure. Johnny Yong Bosch's English voice acting as Yukimura was praised despite some of the screaming required of the character. GameRant praised Yukimura's and Masamune's rivalry for their deep respect and the former's new found passion in his heart when meeting the latter. Meanwhile, when it comes to later works, GameRant noted that Yukimura took a more important role due to his inexperience in his introduction.

ToonZone had mixed thoughts about Yukimura's characterization since he was not highlighted as much as Masamune was but still enjoyed his design due to his striking red color. FandomPost liked the action scenes featured by the two protagonists of the anime as seen in the English release of the series. DVD Talk agreed, noting the appeal of the fight's animation comparing it to an "explosion of firepower and blue lightning. It is borderline supernatural and powerful enough to be seen as basically a nuclear blast a couple klicks away". Blu Ray noted that Masamune and Yukimura's developing friendship and rivalry served as one of the strongest parts of the first season. Anime Herald agreed noting the two rivals "rise to greatness" through their fights and the lessons they learn in the series. While also liking the fight scenes from the first season between Masamune and Yukimura, Fandom Post felt the second season managed to further develop these characters with even better fight scenes. Yukimura was confronted with more serious scenes, leading more men, whereas in the first season he was a mere general under Takeda Shingen. In a review of the movie Sengoku Basara Samurai Kings: The Last Party, Fandom Post enjoyed the friendly clash between Yukimura and his superior Shingen. Anime News Network felt the fight scenes featuring Yukimura were highly entertaining due to the visuals provided by the anime staff. They also noted his growth as a character having inherited the leadership from Shingen.

In On Transmedia Storytelling and Historical Awareness in the Historical Video Game Sengoku Basara, Yukimura's design was praised for fitting the historical figure as well as his rivalry with Masamune which help to make him popular enough to be the subject of several types of promotion in Japan. This also resulted in the noteworthy Yukimura-den which retells his life more realistically. The game was earned by the success of promoting the character; "In this case, the narrative of Sanada Yukimura from the game can be compared or explored through the narrative of Sanada Yukimura from the movie, and whether they are similar or different, the process results in the expansion of the grand narrative of the character." Unable to pick just one, voice actor Takehito Koyasu considers both Yukimura and Masamune as two of his favorite characters. In a series of Sengoku Basara magazines, Yukimura has been featured prominently in the second issue as it focuses largely on his role in the franchise.

Sanada Yukimura has been popular in Japan. In 2016, the character's image was used to promote tourism in Wakayama Prefecture while also promoting the historical person from the Sengoku period. The prefecture hoped to capitalize on his recent popularity with a stamp rally that guided visitors to locations like Kokawa Temple and the Wakayama History Museum. Additionally, Yukimura appeared on the cover of Sanada Yukimura and Sengoku Wakayama Monogatari, a pamphlet that lists tourism and culinary information for the Wakayama Prefecture. In another promotion related to the fictional character, Japanese restaurants owned by Kiwa Corporation started serving meals that used Yukimura's image, as well as masu boxes from Uratika.
