= Mount Tamateyama =

Mountain in the country of Japan

Coordinates: 34°33′43″N 135°37′50″E

Tamate-yama (玉手山), also known as Komatsu-yama (小松山), is a small mountain located in Kashiwara, Osaka, Japan. The mountain was an important feature of the battle of Dōmyōji.

This small peak and its slopes were to be a defense point for the Osaka-based army of Toyotomi Hideyori to defend against the approaching Eastern Army of Tokugawa Ieyasu. On June 3, 1615, Gotō Mototsugu, the commander of the samurai defending the peak was shot by a bullet from Tokugawa forces. He later committed ritual suicide on Komatsu-yama before his positions were overrun by the enemy.

Today the area consists of a small amusement park and a natural park.
