= Karita clan =

Karita clan 刈田氏
- Home province: Mutsu Province

The Karita clan operated from the Katta District, south of Mutsu Province (now Miyagi Prefecture). This clan founded the Shiroishi Castle in the Heian period. The Karita clan later became the Shiroishi clan, which served the Date clan
