= Katakura Kagemitsu =

Japanese samurai

Katakura Kagemitsu

Katakura Kagemitsu (片倉 景光) was a Japanese samurai of the late Edo period. A senior retainer of the Sendai domain. Kagemitsu was the fourteenth Katakura Kojūrō. Served the Meiji government in the reclamation of Hokkaidō. Kagemitsu became a baron in the new kazoku system.

== Family ==
- Father: Katakura Kagenori
- Wife: Akagi Takeko
- Daughter: Mitsuko married Katakura Kenkichi

| Preceded by Katakura Kagenori | Shiroishi-Katakura family head ??-?? | Succeeded by Katakura Kenkichi |
