= Katakura Muratsune =

Katakura Muratsune (片倉村典) (1757–1822) was a Japanese samurai of the Edo period. A senior retainer of the Sendai domain, he was first known as Kagenaka (景仲) and Murayasu (村寿). Muratsune was the ninth Katakura Kojūrō. He was appointed as bugyō (the Sendai equivalent of a Karō elder) in 1797. His childhood name was Shigegoro (繁五郎). On October 27, 1815, he fell ill, and resigned his position as bugyō in favor of his son Kagesada. Retired in 1817.

== Family ==
- Father: Katakura Murakiyo
- Mother: a Concubine
- Children:
  - Katakura Kagesada
  - daughter married Date Munemitsu and Date Narikuni’s mother

== Notes ==
Preceded by Katakura Murakiyo	Shiroishi-Katakura family head ??-1817	Succeeded by Katakura Kagesada
