= Sanada Sandaiki =

Novel

Sanada Sandaiki (真田三代記) is a novel about Sanada Masayuki, Sanada Yukimura and Sanada Daisuke published in mid Edo period.
