= Katakura clan =

The emblem (mon) of the Katakura clan

The Katakura clan (片倉氏, Katakura-shi) is a Japanese family which claims its descent from Fujiwara no Toshihito by way of Katō Kagekado. The family entered Mutsu Province in the 14th century as subordinates of the Ōsaki clan. However, in 1532, they became retainers of the Date clan, and remained so until 1872. In the Sengoku era, the Katakura took part in all the major campaigns of the Date clan. The family's head, Katakura Kagetsuna, became renowned throughout the country, even receiving praise from Toyotomi Hideyoshi, who granted Kagetsuna a fief (thereby bypassing Kagetsuna's status as vassal to Date Masamune).

In the Edo period, the heads of the Katakura clan were hereditary karō in the Sendai Domain. Their personal fief was centered at Shiroishi Castle (modern-day Shiroishi, Miyagi).

Shigenobu Katakura, the current chief priest of Sendai's Aoba Shrine, is a direct descendant of this family.

== Head Family ==
1. Katakura Kagekatsu
2. Katakura Kagefusa
3. Katakura Kagenobu
4. Katakura Kageharu
5. Katakura Kagetsune
6. Katakura Kagetoki
7. Katakura Kageshige
8. Katakura Kagesuke
9. Katakura Kageyuki
10. Katakura Kagehiro
11. Katakura Kagemura
12. Katakura Kageshige
13. Katakura Kagetsuna
14. Katakura Shigenaga
15. Katakura Kagenaga (2nd)
16. Katakura Muranaga
17. Katakura Murayasu
18. Katakura Muranobu
19. Katakura Murasada
20. Katakura Murakiyo
21. Katakura Muratsune
22. Katakura Kagesada
23. Katakura Munekage
24. Katakura Kuninori
25. Katakura Kagenori
26. Katakura Kagemitsu
27. Katakura Kenkichi
28. Katakura Nobumitsu
29. Shigenobu Katakura

== Others ==
- Katakura Kita (1538-1610) was the half-sister of Katakura Kagetsuna and teacher of Date Masamune and Kagetsuna.
