= Katakura Murayasu =

Katakura Murayasu (片倉村休) (1683-1720) was a Japanese samurai of the Edo period. A senior retainer of the Sendai domain, he was first known as Kageakira (景明). Murayasu was also the fifth Katakura Kojūrō. His childhood name was Sannosuke (三之助) later changed to Kojūrō. His father was Katakura Muranaga and his Mother was Matsumae Ichiko.

Preceded by Katakura Muranaga	Shiroishi-Katakura family head 1691–??	Succeeded by Katakura Muranobu
