= Katakura Kagesada =

Katakura Kagesada (片倉景貞) (1775-1840) was a Japanese samurai of the Edo period. A senior retainer of the Sendai domain. Kagesada was the tenth Katakura Kojūrō. His childhood name was Sannosuke (三之助) later Kojuro. His father was Katakura Muratsune and his son was Katakura Munekage.

| Preceded by Katakura Muratsune | Shiroishi-Katakura family head 1817-?? | Succeeded by Katakura Munekage |
