= Katakura Kagenaga (2nd) =

Katakura Kagenaga (片倉 景長, May 14, 1630 – July 9, 1681) was a Japanese samurai of the early Edo period, who served as a senior retainer of the Date clan of Sendai han. His childhood name was Sannosueke (三之助) later changed to Kojūrō. He bore the same name as his great-grandfather. The lord of Shiroishi Castle, Kagenaga was the third bearer of the common name Kojūrō. During the Date incident (Date-sōdō; 伊達騒動), he was a caretaker for the young daimyō, Kamechiyo (later Date Tsunamura). Upon receiving news of the actions of Harada Munesuke, Kagenaga immediately brought the domain to emergency footing, restraining any disorder from breaking out and saving the Sendai domain from the danger of being attaindered. However, as he was sickly, he resigned his post immediately following the incident's resolution.

== Family ==
- Father: Matsumae Yasuhiro (1606-1668)
- Mother: Katakura Kisa, daughter of Katakura Shigenaga
- Foster Father: Katakura Shigenaga (grandfather)
- Foster Mother: Sanada Oume (Step-grandmother)
- Wife: Hisa later Kanshō-in
- Concubines:
  - Ran later Jishō-in
  - Tane later Junshō-in
  - Fuji later Jōshōin
- Children:
  - Omatsu married Date Munefusa by Hisa
  - Yasaemon by Ran
  - Katakura Muranaga by Ran
  - Ohiko
  - Otama married Katahira Shigeharu by Tane
  - Katakura Murasada by Fuji

== Notes ==
Preceded by Katakura Shigenaga	Shiroishi-Katakura family head 1659-??	Succeeded by Katakura Muranaga
