= Katakura Murasada =

Katakura Murasada (片倉村定) (1676–1744) was a Japanese samurai of the Edo period. A senior retainer of the Sendai domain, he was first known as Muratoshi (村利). Retired in 1743 in favor of his adopted son Murakiyo. Murasada was the seventh Katakura Kojūrō. His childhood name was Matakuro (又九郎).

== Family ==
- Father: Katakura Kagenaga (2nd)
- Mother: Jōshōin
- Adopted Son: Katakura Murakiyo

Preceded by Katakura Muranobu	Shiroishi-Katakura family head ??-1743	Succeeded by Katakura Murakiyo
