= Katakura Muranobu =

Katakura Muranobu (片倉村信) was a Japanese samurai of the Edo period. A senior retainer of the Sendai domain, he was the sixth Katakura Kojūrō. His childhood name was Date Kiyonosuke (伊達喜世之助) later become Kojuro later changed to Sukesaburo (助三郎). His name later changed from Katakura Muranobu back to Date Murashige (伊達村茂).

== Family ==
- Father: Date Muraoki (1683–1766)
- Mother: Mizawa Munenao's daughter
- Wife: Date Muramochi's daughter
- Children:
  - Date Murayoshi (1745–1776)
  - Date Murayori

Preceded by Katakura Murayasu	Shiroishi-Katakura family head ??–??	Succeeded by Katakura Murasada
