= Shiroishi Castle =

Building in Shiroishi, Miyagi Prefecture, Japan

- 白石城
- Shiroishi, Miyagi, Japan
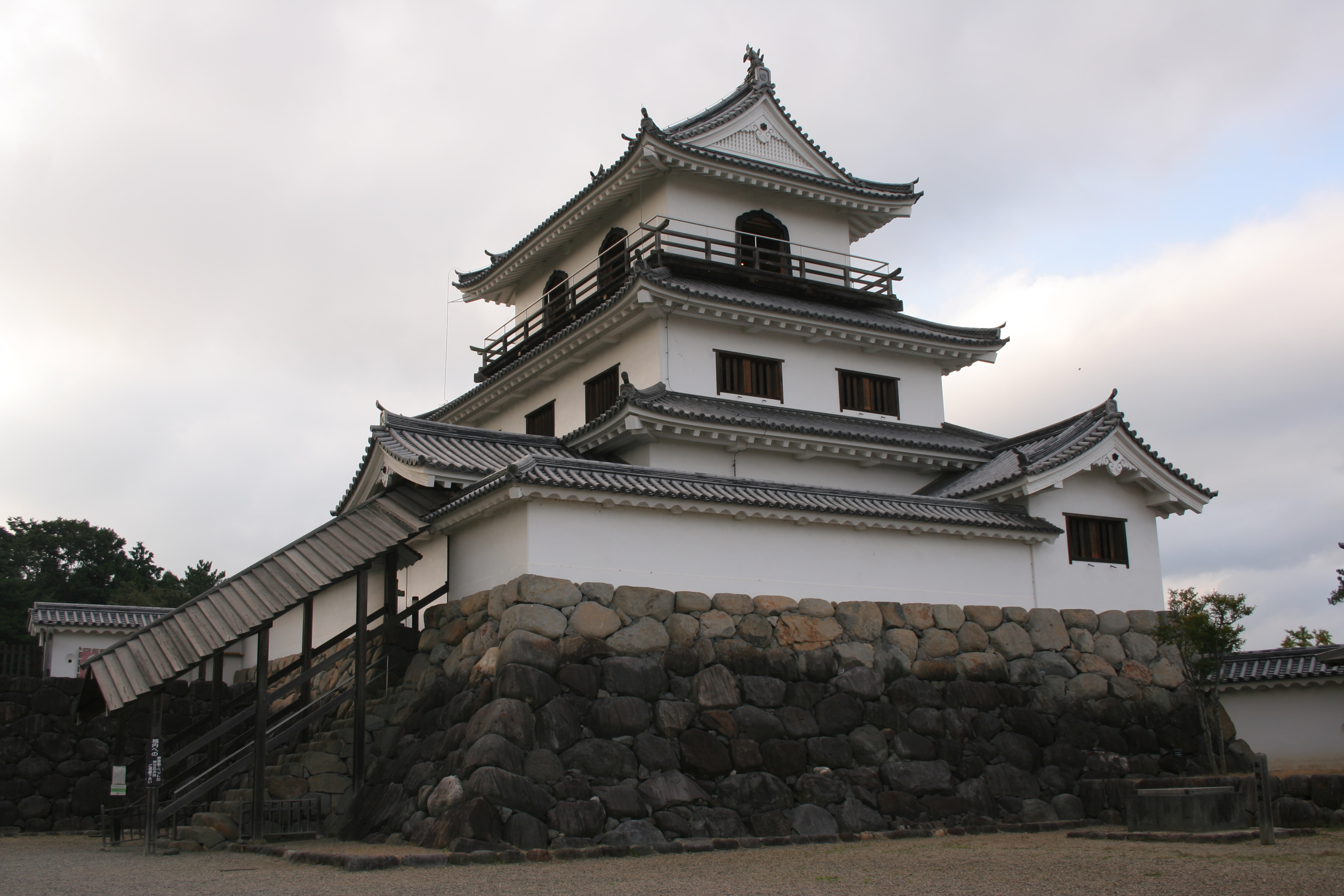
- Shiroishi Castle

Site information
- Type: flatland-style Japanese castle
- Owner: City of Shiroishi
- Controlled by: Shiroishi clan, Gamō clan, Uesugi clan, Katakura clan (17th century – 1871)

Location
- Coordinates: 38°00′09″N 140°37′02″E

Site history
- Built: Kamakura period, rebuilt 1591
- Built by: Shiroishi clan
- In use: Kamakura period through 1871
- Materials: wood, stone
- Demolished: 1875, rebuilt 1995
- Events: Boshin War

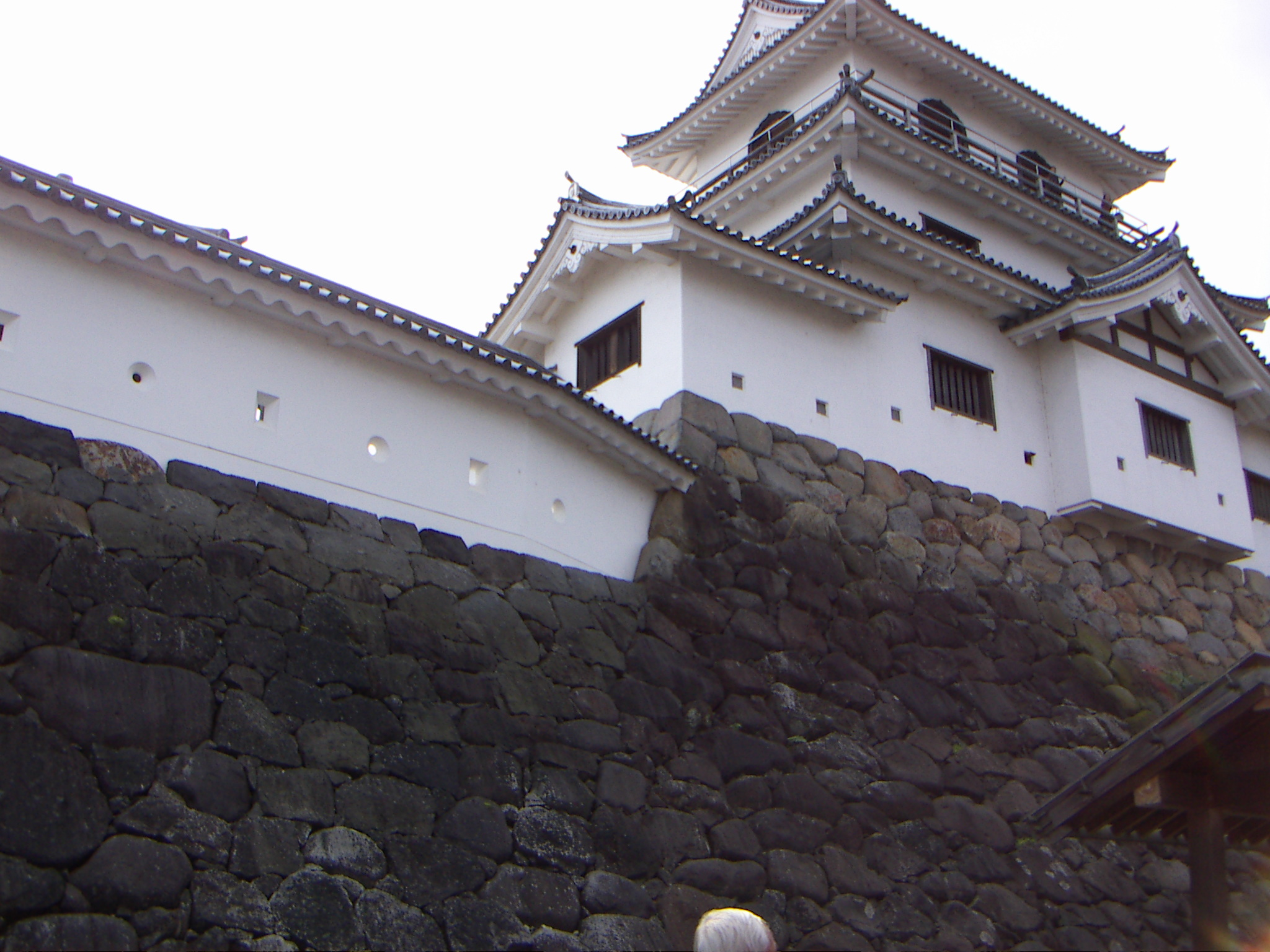
Backside/Wall

Shiroishi Castle (白石城, Shiroishi-jō) is a flatland-style Japanese castle in what is now the city of Shiroishi, Miyagi. During the Edo period, it was the castle of the Katakura clan, who were hereditary retainers of the Date clan of Sendai Domain. During the Boshin War, it was also temporarily the headquarters of the Ōuetsu Reppan Dōmei. The castle was also known by the name of Masuda Castle (益田城, Masuda-jō)

== Early history ==
Shiroishi Castle was founded in the Kamakura period, by the Karita clan.

== Sengoku Era ==
In 1591, during the late Azuchi–Momoyama period, the castle was completely rebuilt by the Gamō clan with stone walls and a donjon, and ruled by the senior retainer Gamō Satonari.

== Edo Era ==
Beginning in 1600, the castle and its environs were recovered by the Date clan as part of Sendai Domain under the Tokugawa shogunate. From 1600 onward, Shiroishi Castle was ruled by the Katakura clan, who were retainers of the Date. It was also one of the few exceptions to the Tokugawa shogunate's rule of one castle per domain. The castle burned down in 1819, but was rebuilt four years later by Katakura Munekage.

== Boshin War ==
The castle was the meeting place for the delegates of the northern domains in early 1868, during the Boshin War. It then became the headquarters of the Ōuetsu Reppan Dōmei. Following the Meiji Restoration, it was briefly placed in the care of the Nanbu clan formerly of Morioka Domain, who were dispossessed of their original holdings by the new Meiji government and assigned a new domain carved out of the southern portion of Sendai Domain. The Katakura clan and its retainers were resettled in Hokkaidō. The castle buildings were demolished in 1875.

== Reconstruction ==
After some of the castle buildings were restored in 1995 using traditional materials and building techniques, the castle is now open to the public. Adjacent to Shiroishi Castle is the Shiroishi Castle History Exploration Museum (白石城歴史探訪ミュージアム). The castle was listed as one of the Continued Top 100 Japanese Castles in 2017.

The castle has also become a "contents tourism" spot for fans of the video game Sengoku BASARA2, which features Katakura Kojūrō as a main character.
