= Katakura Murakiyo =

18th century Japanese samurai

Katakura Murakiyo (片倉村廉) (fl. 1743) was a Japanese samurai of the Edo period. A senior retainer of the Sendai domain, he was first known as Kagehiro (景寛). Murakiyo was the eighth Katakura Kojūrō. His childhood name was Shigekuro (繁九郎) later Yuunosuke (勇之助) later changed to Kojuro.

== Family ==
- Foster Father: Katakura Murasada
- Father: Matsumae Hirotaka
- Wife: Gohime
- Children:
  - Katakura Katayoshi
  - Katakura Muratsune by Concubine
  - Daughter married Date Muratomo

| Preceded by Katakura Murasada | Shiroishi-Katakura family head 1743-?? | Succeeded by Katakura Muratsune |
