= Katakura Muranaga =

Katakura Muranaga (片倉村長) (1667 – 1691) was a Japanese samurai of the Edo period. A senior retainer of the Sendai domain, he was first known as Masanaga (政長). Muranaga was also the fourth Katakura Kojūrō. His childhood name was Sannosuke (三之助) later changed to Kojūrō.

== Family ==
- Father: Katakura Kagenaga (2nd)
- Mother: Jishō-in
- Wife: Matsumae Ichiko
- Son: Katakura Murayasu by Ichiko

Preceded by Katakura Kagenaga	Shiroishi-Katakura family head 1681-1691	Succeeded by Katakura Murayasu
