= Sengoku Basara =

- Genres: Hack and slash Action; Fighting; Beat 'em up
- Developers: Capcom; Arc System Works (Sengoku Basara X); Access Games (Sengoku Basara: Battle Heroes and Sengoku Basara: Chronicle Heroes); KLab Inc. (Sengoku Basara Mobile and Sengoku Basara: Card Heroes); MarvelousAQL Inc. (Browser Sengoku Basara)
- Publisher: Capcom
- Creator: Hiroyuki Kobayashi
- Platforms: PlayStation 2 PlayStation 3 PlayStation 4 PlayStation Portable; Wii; Arcade; Mobile phone Android iOS; PC Browser
- First release: Sengoku Basara; July 21, 2005
- Latest release: Sengoku Basara: Sanada Yukimura-den; August 25, 2016

Sengoku Basara (戦国BASARA) is a series of video games developed and published by Capcom, and a bigger media franchise based on it, including three anime shows, an anime movie, a live action show, and numerous drama CDs, light novels, manga, and stage plays. Its story is loosely based on real events of the titular Sengoku period in the history of feudal Japan. Sengoku Basara was popular in Japan when the games were released as it became a cultural phenomenon, a commonly cited example of games as art, and gained a passionate fanbase.

While Sengoku Basara was mainly popular in Japan, it did gain some popularity in other countries in Asia. Despite being considered niche outside of Asia, it does maintain a small following in other countries. The franchise started with the first Sengoku Basara video game being released in Japan on July 21, 2005, for the PlayStation 2.

Sengoku Basara's producer was Hiroyuki Kobayashi (who was the producer for every console and handheld game in the series except for Sengoku Basara: Sanada Yukimura-den, and is the creator of the franchise), and its director was Makoto Yamamoto (who was the director for every mainline game in the series). Sengoku Basara serves as one of Capcom's flagship series in Japan. As of December 31, 2025, the game series has sold 4.1 million copies worldwide.

== Games ==
=== Console and handheld games ===
==== Sengoku Basara (Devil Kings) ====
Sengoku Basara (戦国BASARA) is the first game in the series and was released in Japan on July 21, 2005, for the PS2 as a hack and slash, action game developed and published by Capcom. Devil Kings, an English-language version of the game, featured altered gameplay and a completely different, supposedly more western audience-oriented dark fantasy story with original characters. It was never used again due to the negative response the localization received from critics, fans, and players.

==== Sengoku Basara 2 ====
Sengoku Basara 2 (戦国BASARA2) is a sequel to the original Sengoku Basara, and it was released in Japan for the PS2 on July 27, 2006. The game was ported to the Wii in 2007 as part of the Sengoku Basara 2 Heroes: Double Pack. An expansion titled Sengoku Basara 2 Heroes was released in 2007. The game marks the series' first anniversary and is considered to have started the "Sengoku Boom" throughout Japan. The Sengoku Boom sparked a renewed interest in the history of Japan (mainly the Sengoku period of feudal Japan, hence the name) where people in Japan went to museums, castles, and battlefields to learn more about the real life history of the various Sengoku Basara characters, buy merchandise related to the game series and the Sengoku period, and buy video games set during the Sengoku period.

==== Sengoku Basara 2 Heroes ====
Sengoku Basara 2 Heroes (戦国BASARA2 英雄外伝 HEROES) is an expansion to Sengoku Basara 2, and is the first expansion in the series. The game was released in Asia for the PS2 and Wii (Japan only) on November 29, 2007. The Wii version includes Sengoku Basara 2 as part of the Sengoku Basara 2 Heroes: Double Pack. Characters that were unplayable in the previous game, Sengoku Basara 2, are playable in Sengoku Basara 2 Heroes. The game also sparked a major boom in tourism to the hometown of Katakura Kojūrō, Shiroishi City.

==== Sengoku Basara X ====
Sengoku Basara X (戦国BASARA X) is a 2D fighting game developed by Arc System Works (creators of the Guilty Gear and BlazBlue series) and published by Capcom, which was released on April 9, 2008, for Japanese arcades, and was ported to the PS2 later the same year in Asia on June 26, 2008.

==== Sengoku Basara: Battle Heroes ====
Sengoku Basara: Battle Heroes (戦国BASARA バトルヒーローズ) is a PSP-exclusive title developed by Access Games and published by Capcom, which was released in Japan on April 9, 2009, as a beat 'em up, action game. The game is a spin-off of the series.

==== Sengoku Basara 3 (Sengoku Basara: Samurai Heroes) ====
Sengoku Basara 3 (戦国BASARA3) is the third game in the main series and a sequel to Sengoku Basara 2, and was released in Asia on July 29, 2010, for the PS3 and Wii (Japan only). It is the first game in the series to be localized outside of Asia since the original game, and was released in North America on October 12, 2010, in Australia on October 14, 2010, and in Europe on October 15, 2010. An expansion titled, Sengoku Basara 3 Utage, was released in 2011. The game marks the series' fifth anniversary. The game currently ranks as the best-selling Sengoku Basara game in the series (before this game was released, it was previously Sengoku Basara 2 Heroes).

==== Sengoku Basara: Chronicle Heroes ====
Sengoku Basara: Chronicle Heroes (戦国BASARA クロニクルヒーローズ) was released for the PSP in Asia on July 21, 2011. The game serves as a sequel to Sengoku Basara: Battle Heroes.

==== Sengoku Basara 3 Utage ====
Sengoku Basara 3 Utage (戦国BASARA3 宴) was released for the PS3 and Wii (Japan only) in Asia on November 10, 2011. The game serves as an expansion to Sengoku Basara 3. Characters that were unplayable in the previous game, Sengoku Basara: Samurai Heroes, are playable in Sengoku Basara 3 Utage. "Utage" is Japanese for "Party".

==== Sengoku Basara HD Collection ====
Sengoku Basara HD Collection (戦国BASARA HDコレクション) was released for the PS3 in Asia on August 30, 2012. It comes with Sengoku Basara, Sengoku Basara 2, and Sengoku Basara 2 Heroes in 720p HD and 16:9 widescreen on one disc. The game currently ranks as the worst-selling Sengoku Basara game in the series (before this game was released, it was previously Sengoku Basara X).

==== Sengoku Basara 4 ====
Sengoku Basara 4 (戦国BASARA4) is the fourth game in the main series. It was released in Asia on January 23, 2014 for the PS3. The game serves as a mixture of a sequel to Sengoku Basara 3, and a soft reboot of the series, so new fans can enjoy it without having to play previous games in order to understand the full story. It's also the first console game in the series to receive a collector's edition, digital release, DLC, and updates, with every other game afterward following up with this. An expanded version titled, Sengoku Basara 4 Sumeragi, was released in 2015.

==== Sengoku Basara 4 Sumeragi ====
Sengoku Basara 4 Sumeragi (戦国BASARA4 皇) was released for the PS3 and PS4 in Asia on July 23, 2015. The game is the first game to be developed by Capcom for the PS4. The game comes with all of the content in Sengoku Basara 4 along with new content. The game marks the series' tenth anniversary. Characters that were unplayable in the previous game, Sengoku Basara 4, are playable in Sengoku Basara 4 Sumeragi. An "Anniversary Edition" of the game containing all of the DLC was released for the PS4 in Japan on July 21, 2020. "Sumeragi" is Japanese for "Emperor".

==== Sengoku Basara: Sanada Yukimura-den ====
Sengoku Basara: Sanada Yukimura-den (戦国BASARA 真田幸村伝) is a spin-off game focusing on the life of one of the series' main protagonists, Sanada Yukimura, and was released in Asia for the PS3 (Japan only) and PS4 on August 25, 2016. The game is more historically accurate than previous games, but still retains a few series' original elements, such as the rivalry between Date Masamune and Sanada Yukimura. This is the first and only console game in the series to not have Hiroyuki Kobayashi and Makoto Yamamoto involved. "Sanada Yukimura-den" is Japanese for "Legend of Yukimura Sanada".

=== Mobile games ===
==== Sengoku Basara Mobile ====
Sengoku Basara Mobile (戦国BASARA MOBILE) was a free-to-play, mobile-based social game developed by KLab Inc. and published by Capcom for mobile phones based on the Sengoku Basara franchise, and was available through Mobage. The game was announced by Capcom on April 27, 2011, and was released in Japan on June 3, 2011, but was shut down on December 7, 2011. Sengoku Basara Mobile is the first mobile game in the series.

==== Sengoku Basara: Card Heroes ====
Sengoku Basara: Card Heroes (戦国BASARA カードヒーローズ) was a free-to-play, mobile-based card RPG for smartphones and feature phones based on the Sengoku Basara franchise, and was available through Mobage. The game was announced by Capcom on April 25, 2012, and was released in Japan on May 29, 2012, but was shut down on June 23, 2014. The game's name would later change to Sengoku Basara: Card Heroes - Matsuri (戦国BASARA カードヒーローズ・祭) on January 29, 2013. "Matsuri" is Japanese for "Festival".

==== Sengoku Basara: Battle Party ====
Sengoku Basara: Battle Party (戦国BASARA バトルパーティー) was a free-to-play, mobile-based gacha RPG for iOS and Android based on the Sengoku Basara franchise, and was available through Google Play and the App Store. The game was announced by Capcom on May 14, 2019, and was released in Japan on June 24, 2019. A Capcom collaboration in the game between Sengoku Basara and Monster Hunter titled, "Sengoku Basara: Battle Party X Monster Hunter: World -Collaboration-", started on November 28, 2019, and ended on December 26, 2019. A trailer for the Monster Hunter collaboration was uploaded on YouTube by Capcom on November 28, 2019. A second Capcom collaboration in the game between Sengoku Basara and Devil May Cry titled, "Sengoku Basara: Battle Party X Devil May Cry 4 -Collaboration-", started on January 14, 2020, and ended on February 13, 2020. A trailer for the Devil May Cry collaboration was uploaded on YouTube by Capcom on January 14, 2020. Download for the game is still available, but it can't be played. The game was shut down on December 21, 2020, due to "external issues" from Capcom's management.

=== Browser games ===
==== Browser Sengoku Basara ====
Browser Sengoku Basara (ブラウザ戦国BASARA) was a free-to-play, browser-based simulation RPG developed by MarvelousAQL Inc. and published by Capcom for PC browsers based on the Sengoku Basara franchise, and was available through Yahoo! Mobage and MooG Games. The game was announced by Capcom on April 25, 2012, and was released in Japan on June 5, 2012, but was shut down on December 27, 2012. Browser Sengoku Basara is the first and only browser game in the series.

== Adaptations ==
The Sengoku Basara franchise has had several different forms of media.

Notably, an anime series was planned and written by Yasuyuki Muto. The first anime, Sengoku Basara, started broadcasting in Japan on April 2, 2009. The series' sequel anime, titled Sengoku Basara II, began broadcast in Japan on July 11, 2010. Furthermore, the series' movie finale titled Sengoku Basara -The Last Party- was released in Japanese theaters on June 4, 2011. All three anime adaptations were licensed in North America in 2012 by Funimation under the titles, Sengoku Basara: Samurai Kings, Sengoku Basara: Samurai Kings 2, and Sengoku Basara: Samurai Kings -The Last Party-. An anime based on Sengoku Basara 3 titled Sengoku Basara: Judge End began broadcast in Japan on July 6, 2014, and was licensed in North America in 2016 by Funimation under the title, Sengoku Basara: End of Judgement. Another anime titled Gakuen Basara, based on the Gakuen Basara manga series, started broadcasting in Japan on October 4, 2018.

Several manga adaptations of the series have been serialized in manga magazines and were later released in tankōbon format in Japan. A manga adaptation of the second game was created by Yak Haibara. The four volume series, Sengoku Basara 2, was published in Japan from 2007-2009. It was published in the United States from 2012-2013 by UDON under the title Sengoku Basara: Samurai Legends. The title change was due to the Sengoku Basara 2 video game not having been released in the United States. Kairi Shimotsuki created the first manga adaptation of the series, based on the first game, which was titled, Sengoku Basara Ranse Ranbu, and was released as a three-volume series in 2006.

Radio shows have been produced, with the first series being released on four CD volumes. A stage play based on Sengoku Basara 3 was announced on July 17, 2011 in Japan and ran later in 2011 from October 14 to October 30, and was later released on DVD in Japan on February 23, 2012. The stage play received "universal acclaim" in Japan. This stage play is considered to be the beginning of the Sengoku Basara stage play series' huge success and popularity in Japan with later stage plays in the series becoming even more successful and popular. There has been a total of 17 stage plays in the series as of 2025, with Capcom doing 1-2 per year from 2009-2019 (1 in 2009, 1 in 2010, 1 in 2011, 2 in 2012, 2 in 2013, 2 in 2014, 1 in 2015, 2 in 2016, 2 in 2017, 2 in 2018, and 1 in 2019).

In 2012, the Takarazuka Revue announced that Flower Troupe would be performing a 'Sengoku Basara' musical. Ranju Tomu and Ranno Hana starred, and Asumi Rio and Nozomi Futo also featured in the adaptation, which played at the Tokyu Theater Orb, from 06/15 - 07/01 in 2013. The staging of the musical was much more lavish than that of the stage plays with a lot more special effects, and less action and stunts. It received "generally favorable" reviews. As of 2025, this is the first and only Sengoku Basara musical to have been performed.

A live-action television drama titled Sengoku Basara Moonlight Party began broadcasting in Japan on July 12, 2012, on the Mainichi Broadcasting System.

In August 2015, Capcom produced a collaborative stage play with Sengoku Basara and Devil May Cry titled "Sengoku Basara VS Devil May Cry". In the play, Dante, Lady, Trish, and Vergil come across some mysterious historical ruins while chasing after a demon, and are sent back in time to Japan's Warring States (Sengoku) period. There, the group meets Date Masamune, Sanada Yukimura, and other characters from the Sengoku Basara franchise. The play ran at the AiiA 2.5 Theater Tokyo for 18 performances from August 20–30. Masanari Ujigawa directed and composed the stage play with Hideaki Itsuno and Izaki Matsuno collaborating on the scenario. Kazushi Miyakoda and Tetsuya Yamaura produced the play with Hiroyuki Kobayashi and Makoto Yamamoto as supervisors.

== Related products ==
A large range of merchandise has been created for the series in Japan, including books, CD soundtracks, drama CDs, figures, magazines, radio CDs, and trading cards.

Cards based on Sengoku Basara were included in Capcom's free-to-play digital collectible card game, Teppen, on October 1, 2020, through an expansion released worldwide and titled "The Tale of Amatsu no Kuni". Sengoku Basara character Oichi was included as a playable hero along with more Sengoku Basara cards in another expansion for Teppen that was released worldwide on January 5, 2021. The expansion is titled, "The Battle of Amatsu no Kuni."
