= Katakura Munekage =

Katakura Munekage (片倉宗景) (1798-1871) was a Japanese samurai of the Edo period. A senior retainer of the Sendai domain. Munekage was the eleventh Katakura Kojūrō. His childhood name was Sannosuke (三之助) later Kojuro. His father was Katakura Kagesada and his son was Katakura Kuninori.

Preceded by Katakura Kagesada	Shiroishi-Katakura family head ??-??	Succeeded by Katakura Kuninori
