= Battle of Dōmyōji =

1615 battle

- Part of the Siege of Osaka
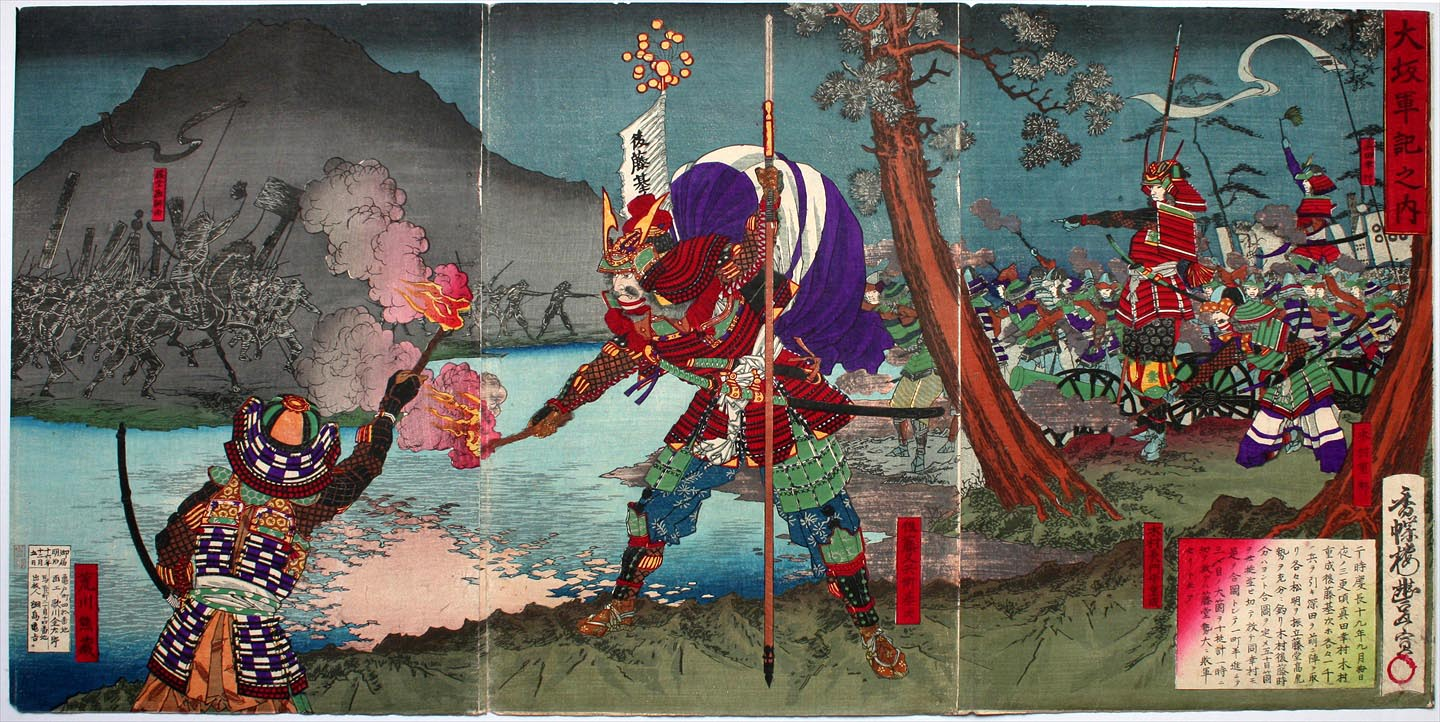
- Gotō Mototsugu and Sanada Yukimura during the battle, by Utagawa Toyonobu
Date	June 5, 1615
Location	Dōmyōji, near Tamateyama, Osaka Prefecture, Japan 34°34′03″N 135°37′12″E
Result	Tokugawa victory

Belligerents
Tokugawa shogunate	Toyotomi clan

Commanders and leaders
Mizuno Katsushige; Honda Tadamasa; Matsudaira Tadaaki; Date Masamune; Murakami Yoshiaki; Tokugawa Tadateru; Mizoguchi Nobukatsu	Gotō Mototsugu ‡‡ Susukida Kanesuke †; Yamamoto Kimio; Inoue Tokotoshi; Makishima Shigetoshi; Sanada Yukimura; Kitagawai Nobukatsu; Yamagawa Katanobu; Akashi Morishige; Fukushima Masamori; Watanabe Tadasu; Ogura Yukiharu; Otani Yoshihisa; Nagaoka Masachika; Igi Tokatsu; Miyata Tokisada; Mori Katsunaga

Strength
34,300	18,400
- Location within Japan

On June 5, 1615, the Eastern Army of Tokugawa Ieyasu and the Osaka Army of Toyotomi Hideyori clashed in battle at Dōmyōji (道明寺の戦い; Dōmyōji no tatakai), Osaka. This battle was one of Japan's major historical battles between samurai forces. This battle was one of a number of battles that took place during the Summer Campaign of the Siege of Osaka that led up to the fall of Osaka to the forces of Tokugawa and the death of Toyotomi Hideyori.

A vanguard force ahead of the Osaka Army was commanded by Gotō Mototsugu. He had with him a force of 2,800 samurai and his mission was to guard against the arrival of elements of The Eastern Army. The eastern border of Osaka is protected by a natural border known as the Ikoma Mountains. Gotō was given the task of guarding the area near Komatsu-yama, a hilly area located near one of very few mountain passes. This pass in the range is created by the Yamato River, which runs just north of Komatsu-yama. He had planned to occupy the high ground provided by the slopes of Komatsu-yama and prevent the enemy from freely entering the flat plains of Osaka that exist once past the mountain.

== Battle ==
On 5 June, Gotō Mototsugu and his forces were at Dōmyōji, a low-lying section of land north of Komatsu-yama on the opposite side of the Ishikawa river which is a tributary of the Yamato-gawa. In order to take their positions on Komatsu-yama they would have to ford the Ishikawa river. As they were doing so, scouts reported that the Eastern Army had exited the pass through the range and were moving up the southern slopes of Komatsu-yama.

At 4:00 AM, Gotō Mototsugu and his samurai made a dash to Komatsu-yama in order to push the Tokugawa forces back.

By 5:00 AM, Gotō Mototsugu was forced back to the summit of Komatsu-yama by a strong attack from the enemy. During this, Gotō Mototsugu was awaiting the planned arrival of reinforcements which had been delayed by thick fog.

At 10:00 AM, Gotō Mototsugu was shot and committed ritual suicide. With his death, his remaining samurai forces lost control of Komatsu-yama and were forced to fight as they were pushed down the southern slope and across the Ishikawa river. As the fog cleared, the Osaka Army forces on the southern side of the Ishikawa river had been revealed. Susukida Kanesuke led the left flank of the Osaka Army. After advancing, the Eastern Army cleared the Ishikawa and made their way up the gentle slope of Dōmyōji. Susukida Kanesuke and his samurai fought them fiercely in an area next to Emperor Ingyo's massive tomb. Susukida Kanesuke, who was in disgrace at the time, fought and died in battle. In doing so, he redeemed his honor.

Sanada Yukimura in command of the Osaka Army under Susukida Kanesuke began combat with Date Masamune in the area of Emperor Ōjin's Tomb and Konda Hachiman Shrine around 12:00 PM. By 5:00 PM Sanada Yukimura made the decision to begin a retreat towards Osaka Castle having already lost two powerful commanders. Tokugawa Tadateru, the sixth son of Tokugawa Ieyasu was given the order to pursue Sanada's force, but he refused. His refusal later led to his exile at Kōya-san.

Sanada Yukimura and his army successfully disengaged in retreat from the Eastern Army.

== Geographical notes ==
This region has been renamed Tamate-yama, but the geographic features of this battle are still referred to as part of Komatsu-yama. The pass through the range, the rivers, and tombs remain, giving any interested party the chance to visit and visualize this battle.
