= Katakura Kagenori =

Katakura Kagenori (片倉景範) (1838–1902) was a Japanese samurai of the Edo period, and served as a senior retainer of the Sendai domain. Kagenori was the thirteenth Katakura Kojūrō. Kagenori moved with his father and a group of the Katakura clan retainers to Hokkaidō. His father was Katakura Kuninori and his mother was Aihime, Date Munehira's daughter. His son was Katakura Kagemitsu.

Preceded by Katakura Kuninori	Shiroishi-Katakura family head ??-??	Succeeded by Katakura Kagemitsu
