= Gotō Mototsugu =

Japanese samurai

- 後藤 基次
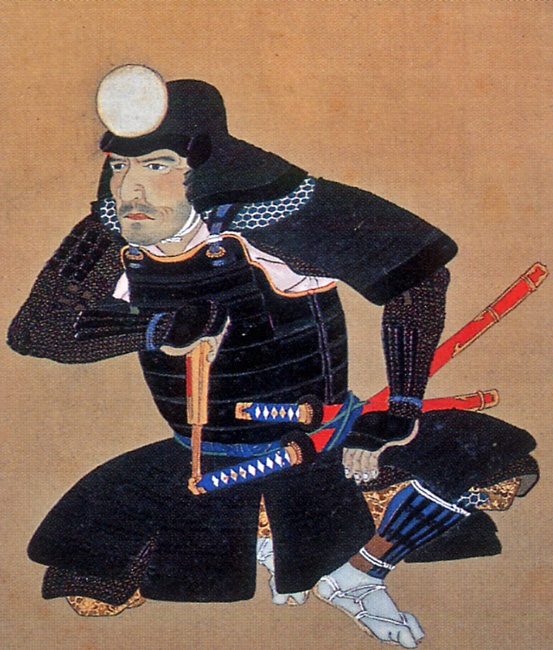
- Born: May 5, 1565
- Died: June 2, 1615 (aged 50)
- Military career
- Allegiance: Kuroda clan Toyotomi clan
- Rank: Samurai
- Conflicts: Siege of Osaka; Battle of Dōmyōji ‡‡

Gotō Mototsugu (後藤 基次; May 5, 1565 – June 2, 1615), also well known as Gotō Matabē (後藤 又兵衛; Japanese pronunciation: [ɡo.toː (|) maꜜ.ta.beː]), was a samurai of the late Sengoku through early Edo periods. He served Kuroda Yoshitaka but retired from the Kuroda clan after Kuroda Yoshitaku had died. Finally, he served Toyotomi Hideyori and Yodo-dono and died at the battle of Dōmyōji during the siege of Osaka in 1615.

His father Gotō Motokuni served Kodera Masamoto. But Motokuni was dead when Matabei was a child. After his father's death, Matabei became a vassal of Kuroda Kanbei.

At the Second Siege of Jinju, during Hideyoshi's invasion of Korea, Gotō was the first samurai to enter Jinju castle.

During the Siege of Osaka, Gotō was one of the most able and fierce generals in Toyotomi Hideyori's Army. He was the chief commander at the battle of Dōmyōji where, severely outnumbered by Date Masamune troops, he held out for reinforcements, which were lost in the fog. Unable to maintain the position without the reinforcements, Mototsugu was harmed by a stray bullet and unable to stand, he committed seppuku. It is said in his kaishaku memoir that he couldn't stop his tears.

After his death, Mototsugu's samurai were easily defeated and his head discovered by enemy forces. History said that his display of valor this day was great enough to shock everyone, allies and enemies: leading his warriors in hit & run tactics, he killed 70 to 80 horse-men by himself. He stopped only because his horse was exhausted and he needed another to continue the fight.

== In popular culture ==
- Kojiki Taishō Gotō Matabei is a novel by Jirō Osaragi.
- Goto Mototsugu is a playable character in video game Sengoku Basara 4 (PS3).
- He appears in Manga " Sengoku Tenshoki ".
- He appears in Nobunaga's Ambition: Sphere of Influence Ascension in the battle of Dōmyōji and other battles in the Siege Of Osaka Castle. It is possible to save him and change history.

== Family ==
- Goto Motokuni (Ja:後藤基国): Father
- Goto Motonori (Ja:後藤基則): Son
- Goto Motoyoshi (Ja:後藤基芳): Son
