= Sanada Maru =

Small fortification attached to Osaka castle

Sanada Maru 真田丸
- southeast corner Osaka Castle, Japan
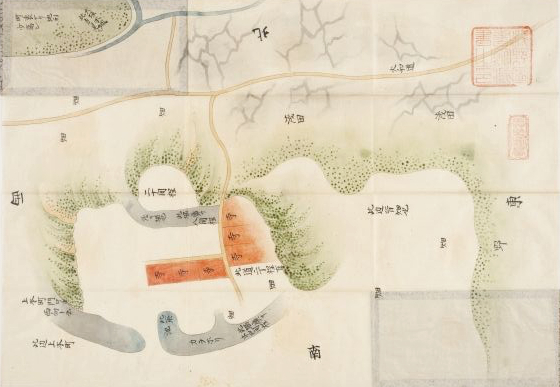
- "Syokoku kojō no zu - Sanada Maru", map of the Sanada Maru. Collection of the Hiroshima City Central Library.

Site information
- Condition: destroyed

Location
- Coordinates: 34.673026°N 135.528767°E

Site history
- Built by: Sanada Yukimura
- Events: Siege of Osaka

The Sanada Maru (真田丸 （さなだまる）, Sanada Maru) was a small fortification attached to Osaka castle. It is famous for being impregnable and playing a key role in defending the castle in the winter of 1615. Later, it was forcefully destroyed despite being exempt from the reconciliation condition.

== Background ==
Osaka castle was built on the Uemachi plateau enclosed by the Yodo River and the Yamato River. It was well fortified to the north but weakly guarded to the southern Tennōji plateau. Sanada Yukimura built the fortification in front of the outer moat, at the Kuruwa port, at the southeastern Hirano-guchi (平野口) gate and beside the Kuromon-guchi (黒門口) gate. Due to its position, Sanada Maru became an obstacle to the main Tokugawa force during the Siege of Osaka.

By 1615, after its destruction, the tower keep era had reached its peak and construction declined with the establishment of the Pax Tokugawa, which lasted until the Meiji period in the late 19th century.

== History ==
In 1614, Osaka castle, the stronghold of the Toyotomi clan, represented the last obstacle to Japan's unification under the Tokugawa hegemony. Toyotomi Hideyori appointed Sanada Yukimura as the garrison commander due to his experience opposing Ieyasu's army in his castle at Ueda during the Sekigahara campaign. At that time the castle had two moats, which still exist, and Hideyori's engineers created an outer moat by cutting a channel between the canal that existed to the west and the Nekoma stream which flowed from south to north on the eastern side.

The following campaign and battle is often referred to as the last stand of the samurai before the Tokugawa shogunate reformed the ways of the samurai including prohibiting practices like headhunting.

The attack on Sanada Maru began on December 4. Yukimura and about 6-7,000 men defending Sanada Maru against Tokugawa forces of approximately 10-30,000 men. The Tokugawa forces were repeatedly repelled, and Sanada's troops launched a number of counterattacks, even breaking through the siege lines.

By December 18, all the outlying forts and waterways had fallen but the Sanada Maru proved impregnable. As a stockade had been built, Ieyasu began to starve out the huge castle. However, supplies were sufficient to feed everyone for several years. Ieyasu then resorted to artillery bombardment. Sakers fired from the north, no less than 300 culverins blasted from the south, and more culverins firing from the north and the east were able to do considerable damage.

While long-range culverins kept up a bombardment, miners began digging in an attempt to weaken the walls. As there were still uncommitted clans who might be tempted to attack the Tokugawa from the rear, time was on the side of Hideyori. Ieyasu used the steadily improving bombardment to pressure for peace negotiation. Hideyori accepted a peace formula whereby the Tokugawa army would withdraw and Osaka castle would remain in Hideyori's hand under the provision of no further "rebellion" against the Tokugawa Shōgun. Many Tokugawa troops did not leave but instead worked to fill in the outer moat. Hideyori protested but by the time, a week later, Ieyasu agreed that these had indeed not been included in the peace agreement the outer moat had ceased to exist, and his men were turning to the second moat.

== Location ==
The place where Sanada Maru was located is north of the Sanadayama Park. It was originally a little hill which was recessed in the center. Today it is a small underdeveloped plot of land in an urbanized area. A partial moat and bridge are present. Just south of it is Sanada High School.

== Structure ==
Sanada Maru was an earthwork barbican with a simple two-storey wooden wall on top with firing platforms augmented with other simple means of defense like palisades. A dry moat offered additional defence. Cannons were placed along the walls, together with firebomb-projecting mangonels. Defended by the Sanada samurai clan it may be classified as a yagura, although only in the spirit rather than technical accuracy. As essentially a temporary structure it was not copied elsewhere.

== Film, television, and theatrical adaptations ==
Sanada Maru has appeared in part or in full for different media including stage, screen and radio. These adaptations include:

- A 2016 Japanese drama, Sanada Maru for NHK, starring Masato Sakai.

== See also ==
- Maidashi Maru, south-west fortification
