= Sanada Yukimura =

Japanese samurai warrior (1567–1615)

- 真田 信繁
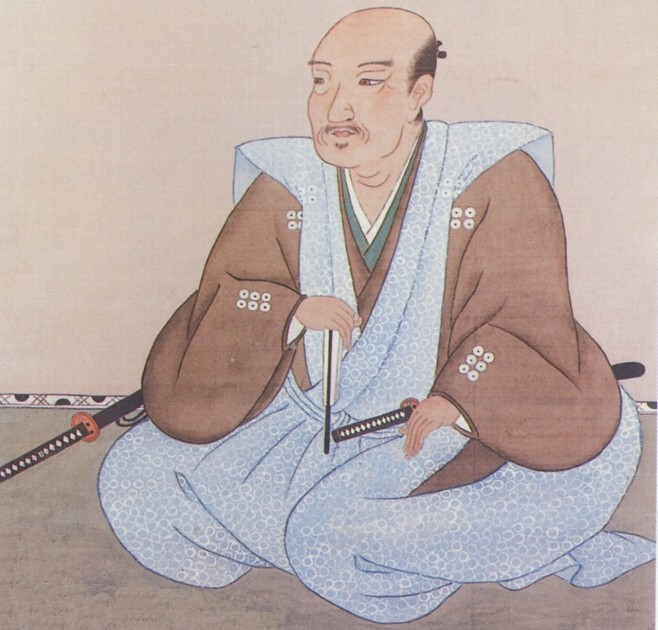
- Born: 1567
- Died: June 3, 1615 (aged 47–48)
- Other names: Sanada Nobushige; Sanada Saemon-no-suke; Ben-maru
- Spouse(s): Lady Hotta; Lady Takanashi; Chikurin-in
- Children: Sanada Yukimasa (Daisuke); Katakura Morinobu (Daihachi); Sanada Yukichika (Gonzaemon)
- Relatives: Sanada Masayuki (father); Kanshō-in (mother); Sanada Nobuyuki (brother); Ōtani Yoshitsugu (father-in-law); Toyotomi Hideyoshi (adopted father-in-law); Komatsuhime (sister-in-law)
- Military career
- Allegiance: Takeda clan Oda clan Uesugi clan Later Hōjō clan Tokugawa clan Toyotomi clan Western Army
- Unit: Sanada clan
- Conflicts: Siege of Oshi (1590); Korean campaign (1592-1598); Siege of Ueda (1600); Siege of Osaka (1614-1615)

Sanada Yukimura (真田 幸村; 1567 – June 3, 1615), was a Japanese samurai warrior of the Sengoku period also known as Sanada Nobushige (真田 信繁) the give name by Takeda Shingen from the name of Shingen's younger brother, Takeda Nobushige, who was a brave and honorable soldier. He was especially known as the leading general on the defending side of the Siege of Osaka. Yukimura was called "Crimson Demon of War" and "The Last Sengoku Hero". Toyotomi Hideyoshi called him "A Hero who may appear once in a hundred years", also the famed veteran of the invasion of Korea, Shimazu Tadatsune, called him the "Number one warrior in Japan" (日本一の兵). Many believe, he was the samurai feared by Tokugawa Ieyasu.

== Early life ==
He was the second son of Sanada Masayuki (1547–1611). His elder brother was Sanada Nobuyuki. He was married to Chikurin-in (Akihime), Ōtani Yoshitsugu's daughter and adopted daughter of Toyotomi Hideyoshi.

Three other wives of Yukimura were his first wife the daughter/sister of Hotta Sakubei, who lost her status to Chikurin-in; Takanashi Naiki's daughter and Ryūsei-in (a daughter of Toyotomi Hidetsugu).

In 1575, the Battle of Nagashino claimed the lives of two of Sanada Masayuki's elder brothers. Masayuki, previously serving Takeda Shingen and Takeda Katsuyori as a retainer, inherited the Sanada clan and left for Ueda Castle. Yukimura also went, taking the Sanada name as well.

By 1582, the Oda-Tokugawa forces had destroyed the Takeda clan. The Sanada initially surrendered to Oda Nobunaga, but, after the incident at Honnō-ji, it became independent again, drifting between stronger daimyōs such as the Uesugi clan, the Later Hōjō clan, and the Tokugawa clan. Eventually, the Sanada clan became a vassal of Toyotomi Hideyoshi.

== Sekigahara campaign ==
In 1600, before the Battle of Sekigahara, Tokugawa Ieyasu rallied various daimyōs to attack Uesugi Kagekatsu. The Sanada clan complied as well, but when Ishida Mitsunari decided to challenge Ieyasu, Masayuki and Yukimura joined the western forces, parting ways with Masayuki's eldest son and Yukimura's brother, Nobuyuki, who joined the eastern forces. It has been said that at first Yukimura followed Ieyasu but, after Ieyasu tried to seize his territory he betrayed Ieyasu. The true motive of Masayuki and Yukimura's decision is disputed with many theories, but there are two main schools of thought: in one, Masayuki made the decision (and Yukimura agreed); he expressed the willingness to take a gamble, so that if he were to join the weak side and win the battle, the Sanada would gain much more power. The other theory is the opposite where they planned a safety net; Masayuki, Yukimura, and Nobuyuki discussed the situation when Ieyasu asked them to state their allegiance clearly, and they decided to join separate sides, so that, regardless of the outcome of the battle, the Sanada clan would survive.

=== Siege of Ueda and Exile ===
The Sanada retreated and fortified Ueda Castle. When Tokugawa Hidetada marched a sizable army on the Nakasendō, the Sanada resisted and were able to fight Hidetada's 40,000 men with only 2,000. However, as the castle did not fall in the short time that he expected, Hidetada gave up and joined the main Tokugawa army, too late however, to participate in the crucial Battle of Sekigahara.

After the battle, Sanada's territory was seized by Tokugawa under Nobuyuki, but Yukimura and Masayuki were exiled to Mt. Koya in the Kii Peninsula. Ueda Castle was given to Nobuyuki. Later, Yukimura rose against the Tokugawa when the Winter Battle of Osaka Castle broke out in 1614.

== Osaka campaign ==
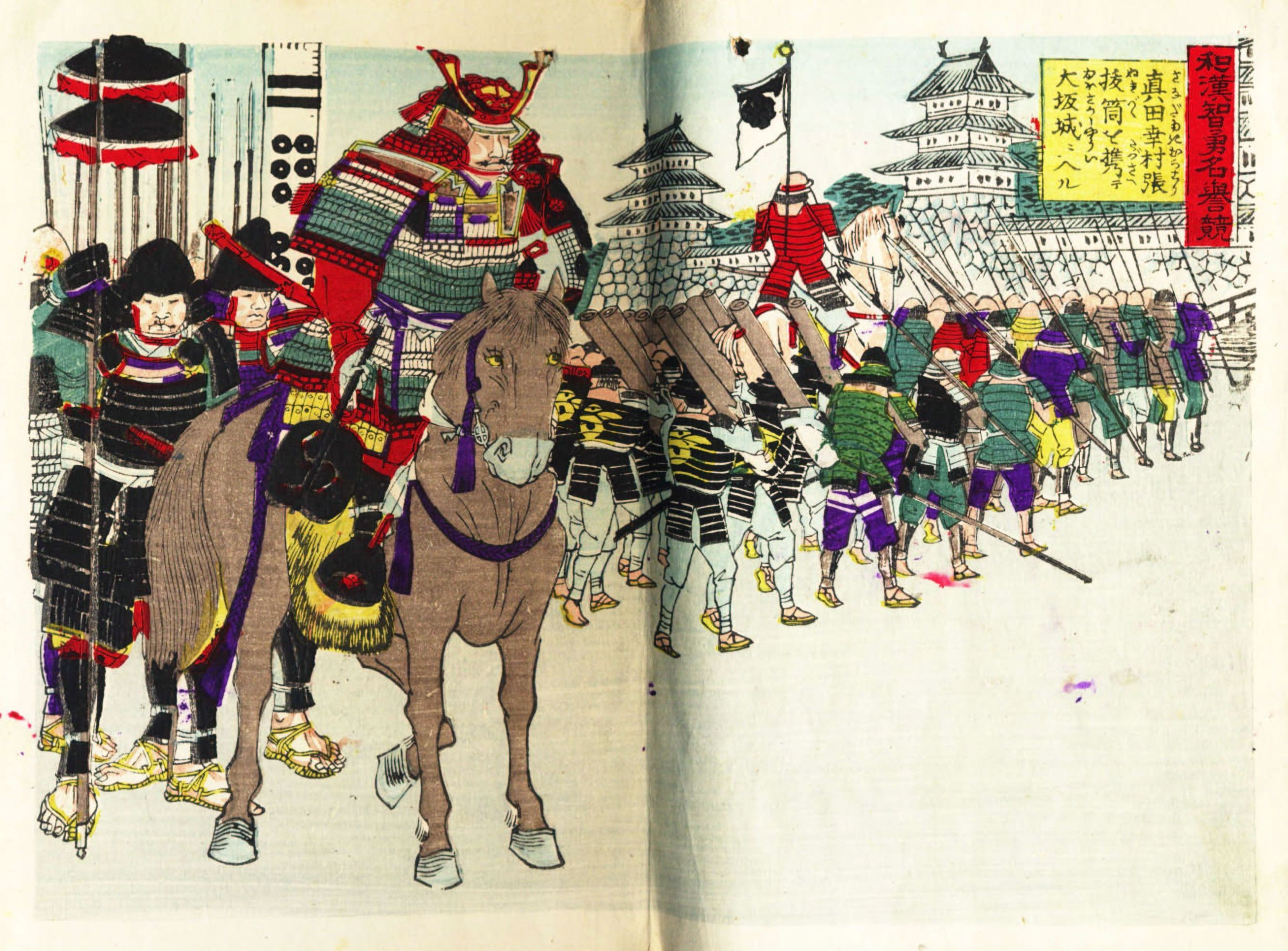
A Meiji period woodprint showing Sanada Yukimura (真田幸村) with his arquebusiers at the Osaka Castle(大阪城）.

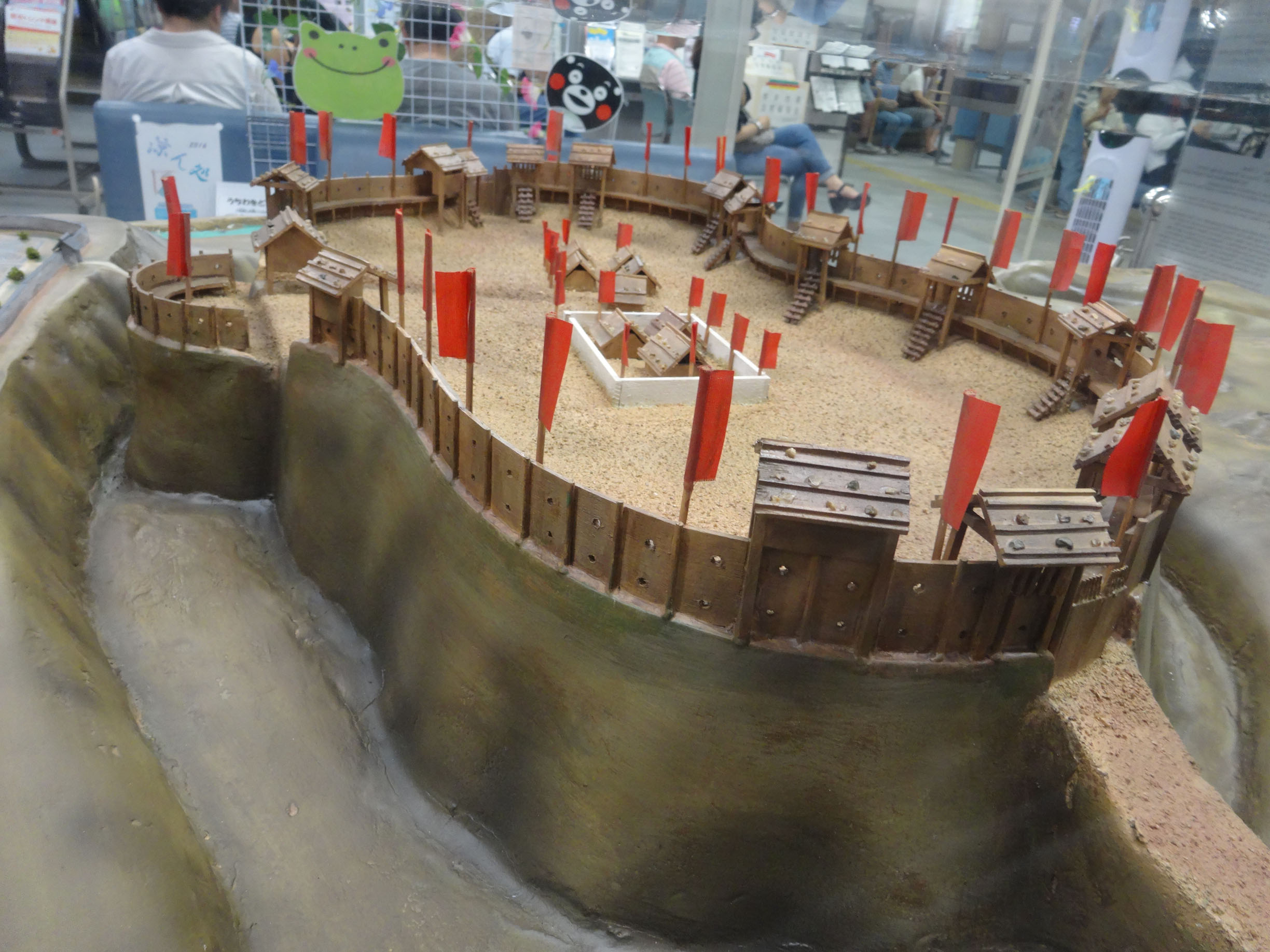
Restructured Model of Sanadamaru

The Siege of Osaka Castle was a series of battles undertaken by the Tokugawa shogunate against the Toyotomi clan, and ending in that clan's destruction. Divided into two stages (Winter Campaign and Summer Campaign), lasting from 1614 to 1615, the siege put an end to the last major armed opposition to the shogunate's establishment. The end of the conflict is sometimes referred to as the Genna Armistice (Genna Embu), because the era name was changed from Keichō to Genna immediately following the siege.

=== Winter Siege of Osaka Castle ===
The winter campaign began on November 19, 1614; Osaka Castle siege commenced on December 4, 1614, and lasted until January 22, 1615, when a truce was reached.

On November 19, Tokugawa forces (approx. 3,000 men) attacked a fort across the Kizu River, destroying it. A week later, Tokugawa forces attacked the village of Imafuku with 1,500 men against a defending force of 600. With the aid of a squad of arquebusiers, the Tokugawa claimed victory once again. Several more small forts and villages were attacked before the siege on Osaka Castle itself began on December 4, 1614. Yukimura built a small fortress called Sanada-maru in the southwest corner of Osaka Castle. The Sanada-maru was an earthwork barbican defended by 7,000 men under Yukimura's command. From there, he defeated the Tokugawa forces (approx. 30,000 men) with groups of 6,000 arquebusiers. The Shōgun's forces were repeatedly repelled, and the Sanada troops launched a number of attacks against the siege lines, breaking through three times. Ieyasu then resorted to artillery, which included 17 imported European cannons and domestic wrought iron cannons, as well as sappers employed to dig under the walls of the fortress. The fortress was impregnable; the Tokugawa suffered many losses.

Ieyasu gave up trying to destroy the castle during this battle, and sued for peace with Toyotomi Hideyori. He proposed a condition for the reconciliation, i.e. to destroy the outer moat of the castle. When his envoy entered the castle grounds, they destroyed not only the outer moat but the inner moat as well.

=== Summer Siege of Osaka Castle and Death ===
On June 3, 1615 (6th day of 5th month of 20 year of Keicho era), at the Battle of Dōmyōji, Sanada Yukimura was in command of the Osaka Army on the right wing and engaged in a battle with Date Masamune forces in the area of Emperor Ōjin's Tomb and Konda Hachiman Shrine. This fight took place at around 12:00 and by 5:00 PM Sanada Yukimura made the decision to retreat towards Osaka Castle.

On June 3, 1615 (7th day of 5th month of 20 year of Keicho era), at the Battle of Tennōji after hurrying back to Osaka castle, Yukimura found the massive Tokugawa force of nearly 150,000 moving into positions in order to make their final assault on the castle. As the Tokugawa units were still moving into formation, the Toyotomi forces launched a last ditch offensive with their approximate 54,000 to 60,000 troops that hoped to take the still loose Tokugawa formations off-guard. As the vanguard of the Tokugawa left flank under Matsudaira Tadanao marched to their positions, Yukimura's troops charged down from Chausuyama (茶臼山) and fought with desperate abandon together with Mori Katsunaga's contingent. As Matsudaira's line began to crumble, Ieyasu rushed his personal body of troops up to support Matsudaira and Yukimura saw his chance to smash through the center. If he could keep the center of the Tokugawa forces tied up long enough for Hideyori to sally out of the castle and lead a general charge on the exposed Tokugawa flank, the Toyotomi forces might have a chance at victory—or so he hoped. Thus, at this moment, Yukimura dispatched his son, Sanada Daisuke back to the castle to urge Hideyori to seize the moment and sally forward. But Hideyori was too late. As the fighting raged around him, the exhausted Yukimura collapsed on a camp stool.

A recent theory regarding the death of Yukimura posits that Yukimura was killed after a bout of single combat with Munetsugu by spear. At first Munetsugu did not recognize Yukimura and cut off his head and brought it back to the Tokugawa army camp. Yukimura's head was only recognized when an acquaintance of the Sanada clan visited the camp and recognized that it was Yukimura.

== Family ==
=== Parents ===
- Father: Sanada Masayuki
- Mother: Kanshō-in (1549?-1613)

=== Siblings ===
- Muramatsu-dono
- Sanada Nobuyuki
- Sanada Nobukatsu
- Sanada Masachika

=== Children ===
- Sue/Kiku (すへ/菊) (name meaning "chrysanthemum"). Yukimura's oldest daughter, her mother was Yukimura's original legal wife and Sanada vassal Hotta Sakubei's sister/daughter. Sue/Kiku was adopted by Hotta Sakubei.
- Ichi (市). Yukimura's second daughter, her mother was either Yukimura's first wife Hotta Sakubei's sister or his second wife Takanashi Naiki's daughter, died in the exile in Kudoyama.
- Sanada Daisuke (真田 大助) (1600/1603?–1615). Yukimura's and Chikurin-in's oldest child and eldest son. Born in exile on Mount Kudo. He was born around 1600–1602. He fought with his father in the Osaka Winter Battle to defend the Sanada Maru fortress. When Osaka castle fell, Yukimasa committed seppuku with Toyotomi Hideyori. He was also known as "Sanada Yukimasa" (真田 幸昌 a wordplay on the name of his grandfather Masayuki 昌幸 - Yukimasa is written with the kanji for Masayuki in reverse).
- Oume (阿梅) (1604–1681) (name meaning "plum"). Yukimura and Chikurin-in's daughter, born on Mount Kudo. After the fall of Osaka castle, she married Katakura Shigenaga, son of Katakura Kagetsuna. Thanks to Oume, the surviving members of the Sanada clan and all of their retainers were able to find refuge in the Katakura clan. The Katakura crest was even changed to show the 6 coin symbol of the Sanada.
- Naho (also known as Den, Oden) (なほ/御田) (1604–1635). Yukimura and Ryūsei-in's daughter.
- Akuri (あくり) (dates unknown) (name meaning "chestnut"). Yukimura and Chikurin-in's daughter. Akuri was adopted by Takigawa Kazuatsu, a Tokugawa vassal, after the fall of Osaka castle. Yukimura's sister was married to Kazuatsu. Akuri married Gamou Genzaemon. She was the daughter that was captured along with Chikurin-in by Asano Nagaakira's troops, but both were spared.
- Oshobu (阿菖蒲) (160?–1635) (name meaning "iris"). Oshobu was Yukimura and Chikurin-in's daughter. Born on Mount Kudo. She was adopted by Katakura Shigenaga and married to Tamura Sadahiro, a retainer of Date Masamune.
- Okane (おかね) (dates unknown). Yukimura and Chikurin-in's daughter. Born on Mount Kudo. She married Ishikawa Sadakiyo. It's said that Sadakiyo changed his name to Sourin, moved to Kyoto and became a master of the tea ceremony. Chikurin-in came to live with Okane after losing her husband. Sourin and Okane had a memorial built for Yukimura and Chikurin-in in Kyoto.
- Sanada Daihachi (真田 大八) (1612–1670). Yukimura and Chikurin-in's second son. He was born on Mount Kudo. He was adopted by Katakura Shigenaga, and became "Katakura Morinobu" (片倉 守信). However, the Sanada name was restored to his line generations later.
- Miyoshi Yukinobu (三好 幸信) (1615–1667). Yukimura and Ryūsei-in's son. He was born two months after the death of his father He hesitated to use Sanada name and used the Miyoshi clan name instead, which was the original family name of his maternal grandfather Hidetsugu; he called himself as Sajiro MIYOSHI.
- Sanada Yukichika (真田 之親) (1615–1670). Born shortly after his father's death, to Chikurin-in. He is not mentioned in historical records, and appears only in folk tales. He is also known as "Sanada Gonzaemon". In one of the tales, it is said that he is a son of Chikurin-in and Yukimura and that he was born in 1615. He supposedly died in 1670 (真田 権左衛門).

== Legends and popular depiction ==
According to primary historical sources and personal letters, he was never referred to as Yukimura. That name surfaced in a military novel written during the Edo period and has since been popularized in modern plays, books, novels, and different media of entertainment. The historical documents use his historical name "Nobushige".

A legend says that Yukimura had ten heroes who took an active role at the battles at Osaka Castle. They were called the Sanada Ten Braves, a group of ninja.

A myth says he indeed managed to kill Ieyasu, but the Ogoshō was replaced by a kagemusha (a decoy or doppelganger) called Ogasawara Hidemasa. This myth is testimony to the respect modern Japanese have for Yukimura's skills as a military commander.

Another legend states that in the winter of 1614, Tokugawa Ieyasu sent an envoy to Yukimura with a notice that, if he were to abandon the Toyotomi cause, he would give him the entire prefecture of Shinano and 400,000 koku. Yukimura laughed and posted the notice on the wall for all in the castle to see.

== See also ==
- Sanada Taiheiki, a Japanese drama in 1985, played by Masao Kusakari
- Sanada Maru, a Japanese Taiga drama in 2016, played by Masato Sakai
- Samurai Warriors: Spirit of Sanada, a hack and slash video game that focuses on the Sanada clan
- Nioh, a souls-like video game that depicts Sanada Yukimura and other historic figures during the Siege of Osaka..
- The Battle Cats, a tower-defense game about cats that depicts Sanada Yukimura and other historic figures in a gacha banner where he can be unlocked as a unit.
