= Aoba Shrine =

Shinto shrine in Miyagi Prefecture, Japan

Aoba Jinja 青葉神社
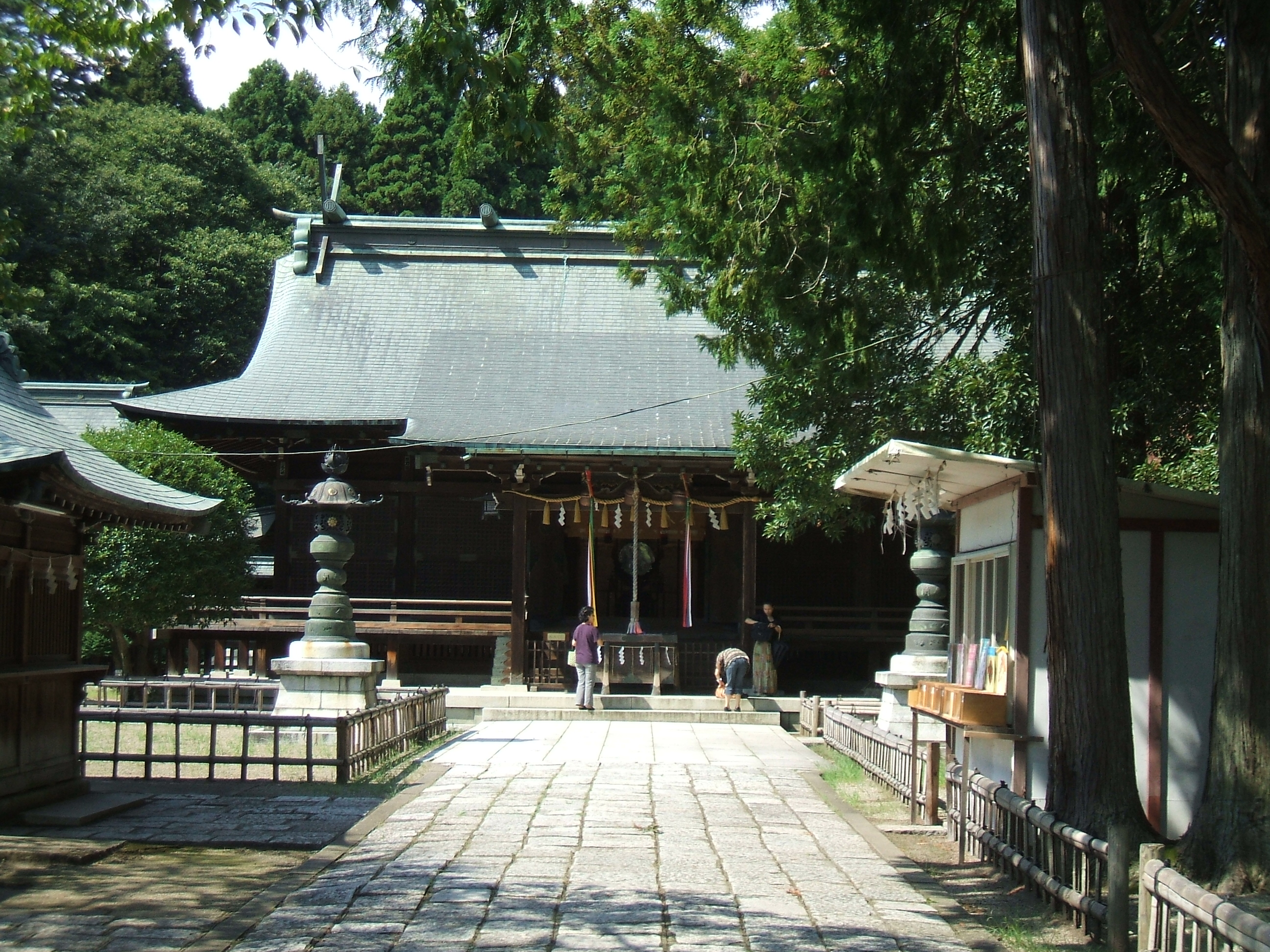
- Honden of Aoba Jinja

- Location within Miyagi Prefecture Location within Japan

Religion
- Affiliation: Shinto
- Deity: Date Masamune
- Festival: October 9, 10

Location
- Location: 7-1 Aoba-cho, Aoba-ku, Sendai-shi, Miyagi-ken 980-0916
- Interactive map of Aoba Jinja 青葉神社
- Coordinates: 38°16′58.2″N 140°51′46.4″E

Architecture
- Established: 7 February 1874

Website
- www.aoba-jinja.com

Aoba Shrine (青葉神社, Aoba Jinja) is the memorial shrine of Date Masamune, located in Aoba-ku, Sendai, Miyagi Prefecture, Japan, near the site of the former Aoba Castle. The shrine was built in 1873 by petition of former retainers of the Date clan of former Sendai Domain to enshrine the deified spirit (kami) of Date Masamune under the name of Takefuruhiko-no-mikoto. This was in accordance with a practice which began in the Bakumatsu period and continued into the early Meiji period of establishing a shrine to the founders of the daimyō clan which ruled each feudal domain under the Tokugawa shogunate. Under the State Shinto ranking system, the shrine was designated as a prefectural shrine.

The current Honden dates from 1927. The torii gate was damaged in the 2011 Tōhoku earthquake and tsunami.

Its current chief priest is Katakura Shigenobu, the 16th hereditary chieftain of the Katakura clan, who served as castellans of Shirakawa Castle under the Date clan.
