= Deathground (2025 video game) =

- Developer: Jaw Drop Games
- Publisher: Jaw Drop Games
- Composer: David Housden
- Engine: Unreal Engine 5
- Platform: Windows
- Release: 7 October 2025 (early access)
- Genre: Survival horror
- Modes: Single-player, multiplayer

Deathground is an upcoming survival horror video game by developer and publisher Jaw Drop Games. A Kickstarter campaign was launched in July 2020 to help fund the game, which is being developed for Windows. It received an early access release on Steam on 7 October 2025.

== Gameplay ==
Deathground is a survival horror game played from a first-person perspective. Players take on the role of humans who must fight for survival against dinosaurs while navigating through various environments and facilities. The game has six character classes, and it can be played solo or as a co-op game with up to four players total. Players must search and investigate the environment in order to complete objectives and acquire resources for survival. The game features several dinosaurs, including Compsognathus, Utahraptor, Allosaurus, Tyrannosaurus rex, Brachiosaurus, and Triceratops.

== Development and release ==
Deathground was announced in July 2020, and had been in development for more than six months by Jaw Drop Games, a British indie game developer. Progress up to that point was self-funded. The game's announcement was accompanied by a trailer and the launch of a Kickstarter campaign to raise additional funding. Jaw Drop Games quickly reached its financing goal, and periodically released new images and trailers as development continued.

Gaming outlets favorably compared Deathground to the Jurassic Park franchise and the video game Alien: Isolation (2014). The latter was acknowledged as a source of inspiration, as well as other games such as Dino Crisis (1999) and GTFO (2021). The film Jurassic Park (1993) also inspired the development team. Ryan Scott of Fangoria wrote about Deathground in 2023, after seeing a new trailer, that it "looks like the Jurassic Park video game we've deserved for a long, long time." Writers for PCGamesN also believed that Deathground could fill the void left by the Dino Crisis series, dormant since 2003.

The development team sought to ensure paleontological accuracy, for instance by including feathered dinosaurs such as Utahraptor, although feathers can be toggled off if desired. Deathground is being developed with Unreal Engine 5. The game's composer is David Housden.

Deathground was originally planned for an early access release on Steam in the third quarter of 2021, to be followed by a full release the next year. However, the game missed both dates as development continued. A new trailer debuted in March 2025, with the early access release scheduled for later in the year, eventually occurring on October 7.
