= Hiroyuki Kobayashi (producer) =

Japanese producer (born 1972)

- 小林 裕幸
- Born: August 12, 1972 (age 54); Nagoya, Japan
- Education: Chukyo University
- Occupations: Video game producer; anime producer; planner; supervisor
- Years active: 1995–present
- Employer(s): Capcom (1995–2022); GPTRACK50 (2022–present)
- Known for: Resident Evil; Dino Crisis; Devil May Cry; Sengoku Basara

Hiroyuki Kobayashi (小林 裕幸, Kobayashi Hiroyuki; born August 12, 1972) is a Japanese video game producer. A former employee of Capcom, he is the founder of GPTRACK50, a subsidiary studio of NetEase.

== Career ==
Kobayashi studied computer science at Chukyo University. After graduating, he joined Capcom in 1995 and worked on the first Resident Evil game as a programmer. After working as programmer on the sequel and a planner on the first Dino Crisis game, his first producer role was on Dino Crisis 2 in 2000.

Starting with the first Sengoku Basara game (titled Devil Kings in North America) in 2005, Kobayashi worked as the producer for the video game series as well as a planning supervisor for the various anime adaptations. He was very interested in the Sengoku period and wanted to create an action game inspired by that period.

After twenty seven years, Kobayashi left Capcom in March 2022 and announced that he joined NetEase in August of that same year.

Kobayashi established the company GPTRACK50 in October 2022, and produced the zombie role-playing video game Stupid Never Dies.

== Works ==
=== Video games ===
Year	Title	Role
1996	Resident Evil	Programmer
1998	Resident Evil 2	Programmer
1999	Dino Crisis	Planner
2000	Dino Crisis 2	Producer
2001	Resident Evil – Code: Veronica X	Associate producer
2001	Devil May Cry	Producer
2002	Resident Evil	Producer
2002	Resident Evil Zero	Promotional producer
2003	P.N.03	Producer
2003	Dino Crisis 3	Producer
2004	Under the Skin	Producer
2005	Resident Evil 4	Producer
2005	Killer7	Producer
2005	Devil Kings	Producer
2006	Sengoku Basara 2	Producer
2007	Sengoku Basara 2 Heroes	Producer
2008	Devil May Cry 4	Producer
2008	Sengoku Basara X	Producer
2009	Sengoku Basara: Battle Heroes	Producer
2010	Sengoku Basara: Samurai Heroes	Producer
2011	Sengoku Basara Chronicle Heroes	Producer
2012	Dragon's Dogma	Producer
2012	Resident Evil 6	Executive producer
2013	Gaist Crusher	Executive producer
2014	Sengoku Basara 4	Executive producer
2015	Dragon's Dogma Online	Executive producer
2018	Mega Man 11	Executive producer
2026	Stupid Never Dies	Executive producer

=== Anime ===
Year	Title	Role
2007	Devil May Cry: The Animated Series	Supervisor
2008	Resident Evil: Degeneration	Producer
2009	Sengoku Basara: Samurai Kings	Planning supervisor
2010	Sengoku Basara II	Planning supervisor
2011	Sengoku Basara: The Last Party	Planning supervisor
2012	Resident Evil: Damnation	Producer
2014	Sengoku Basara: End of Judgement	Planning supervisor
2017	Resident Evil: Vendetta	Supervisor
2020	Dragon's Dogma	Producer
2021	Resident Evil: Infinite Darkness	Executive producer
