= Regina (Dino Crisis) =

Fictional character in the Dino Crisis series

- Dino Crisis character
- Regina as seen in Dino Crisis 2 (2000)
- First game: Dino Crisis (1999)
- Created by: Shu Takumi; Shinji Mikami
- Designed by: Joji Lazenby (detailed model)
- Voiced by: EN: Stephanie Morgenstern; JA: Atsuko Tanaka (Namco x Capcom)

Regina (Japanese: レジーナ, Hepburn: Rejīna) is a character in Capcom's survival horror and action-adventure video game series Dino Crisis.

== Conception and design ==
When developing the game Dino Crisis for Capcom, the game's development was initially overseen by Shu Takumi, who acted as both the game's director and script writer. However, due to his inexperience and a lack of help, he was relieved from the director position, with Shinji Mikami replacing him. Mikami wanted the game's protagonist, Regina, to be a "cool woman", but someone forced to be such due to her past experiences, "not a person whose personality you can easily understand" but conveyed through subtle gestures and dialogue in the game's script. In development interviews for Dino Crisis 2, it is revealed Regina is not actually her name, but her codename as a spy for the government agency she works for.

Standing 5 ft 9 in tall, Regina is a woman with a slender build, with her bright red hair in a bobcut that frames her face. Her outfit consists of a grey spandex bodysuit that covers her body with the exception of her upper arms. A black leather leotard covers her torso with a dipping neckline, while matching tall boots and fingerless gloves cover her feet and hands respectively. She wears a watch on her left wrist, gun holsters on the sides of her hips, and an additional holster strapped around her right thigh.

Her outfit was inspired by a female warrior character in the 1997 movie Spawn, and the two males characters in the game were designed afterwards to match Regina. The character model used in promotional material and cutscenes was designed by Joji Lazenby, who added his own touches. Regina's face differs slightly between regions in the original Dino Crisis as a result, with international releases using the original design, while the Japanese version used Lazenby's adjustments.

== Appearances ==
In the Dino Crisis series, Regina is the codename of a member of the Secret Operation Raid Team (S.O.R.T.), a U.S. Army espionage and intelligence group. Regina operates as a weapons specialist, but often undertakes other tasks as assigned, such as gathering intelligence. In the first Dino Crisis, taking place in 2009, S.O.R.T. is assigned a mission to infiltrate a "Third Energy" research facility on Ibis Island. Upon arriving at the facility, S.O.R.T. discovers it infested with dinosaurs. Despite difficulties with the new inhabitants and the security systems of the facility, Regina and the surviving members of the team complete their mission and escaped the island.

In Dino Crisis 2, set one year later, Regina is called back into service after Third Energy has caused an entire region to be transported to a different time, leaving a prehistoric jungle in its place. Regina and a large contingent of Tactical Reconnoitering and Acquisition Team (T.R.A.T.) soldiers are sent to rescue any survivors and recover any useful data on Third Energy. The mission goes wrong from the start as the majority of the T.R.A.T. forces are massacred in their base camp. Regina and the surviving soldiers attempt to complete the mission, but arrive too late to save the surviving civilians. Succeeding in recovering the Third Energy data, Regina uses a timegate to escape, leaving the last surviving T.R.A.T. member, Dylan, behind with a promise that she would return and rescue him as soon as she could.

Regina has also appeared in the tactical role-playing video game Namco × Capcom, beginning on a cruise ship from Gun Survivor 4 (Resident Evil: Dead Aim), as a card in SNK vs. Capcom: Card Fighters' Clash, and a playable character in Puzzle Fighter. In the animated television series adaptation of the Ace Attorney video games, a character with an identical resemblance to Regina is named Regina Locomoti as a nod to Dino Crisis' protagonist.

== Promotion and reception ==
A figure of her was released by Yujin in the Namco × Capcom series. In Resident Evil 3: Nemesis, the player can unlock her outfit with a red wig as a bonus costume for Jill Valentine. Annie also "cosplays" as Regina in Super Ultra Dead Rising 3 Arcade Remix Hyper Edition EX Plus Alpha, a downloadable content for Dead Rising 3.

Regina was well received upon debut. Mikel Reparaz of GamesRadar+ stated she had a distinctive look, described as having "Asian features and fire-engine-red bob", and it coupled with a " skintight-yet-utilitarian velociraptor-fighting outfit" helped sell copies of Dino Crisis. David Meikleham of the same website meanwhile noted that while the Dino Crisis series was never as successful as Capcom's Resident Evil series, Regina was a strong lead and made the protagonists of the latter look feeble by comparison. However as the series had shifted away from her character and the second game ended on a cliffhanger, they presumed that Capcom had abandoned her.

PSM featured Regina in their first video game character "swimsuit issue", stating their appreciation of her because she is "tough, classy, and makes kicking dinosaur butt look good". In an interview in the same issue with Mikami, they stated Regina was "a different type of heroine", in that she was not as gratuitously sexy as most female video game characters at the time, while also praising her again as "intelligent and classy". Portuguese magazine SuperGamePower meanwhile selected her as one of video gaming's "muses", calling her experienced and calculating while also emphasizing how said experience portrayed her as being able to approach desperate situations with "calm and coolness". an opinion further shared by the staff of Famitsu.

Peter Olafson in an article for the New York Times had developed a crush on the character, something that surprised him given his apathy towards other female characters in gaming. Praising her "short red hair, intelligent eyes and a level head", by comparison he looked at her with the "glazed reverie of a schoolboy's daydream", finding himself paying rapt attention to her during the course of the game. He further attributed this to how different she was from characters such as Lara Croft in that she gave off a sense of normalcy, displayed as capable but vulnerable. While he acknowledged her outfit was out of the ordinary her figure was not, built "more like an athlete than a centerfold" in his eyes.

In their two-page spread for the character, British magazine Arcade made the same comparison towards Lara Croft in that she was "not so buxom when entering a new room half of her is still in the previous". Instead they felt she had more in common with Jill Valentine physically, and furthermore felt that along with her demeanor and presentation Capcom had introduced another "character to die for" with Regina. Japanese magazine Game Hihyou meanwhile featured her as part of their "3D Beautiful Girls Gathering" series, praising her attractiveness but also her personality. However, in a later issue they criticized her portray in Dino Crisis 2, feeling that her humanity was diminished in the title, particularly in how her "coolness of the previous game was lost" and that her "timid and wavering attitude at the end was unlike her".

Toshimichi Kakizaki of Japanese magazine CG-iCupid praised her as one of gaming's "virtual idols", stating that with Dino Crisis 2 she appeared more confident and capable of taking on the game's enemies, expressing that this was a sharp contrast to her demeanor in the first game where she was often shown as scared. Additional praise was given to how attractive she was, with Kakizaki stating her muscular build did not match her "delicate frame", but at the same time she had gentler eyes than the first game, and compared her appearance to actress and singer Kyoko Fukada.
