= Biohazard 2 =

Biohazard 2 may refer to:

- Resident Evil 2, a 1998 video game
  - Resident Evil 2 (2019 video game), 2019 remake of the above
- Resident Evil: Apocalypse, the second live-action film in the Resident Evil series, released in 2004
- Resident Evil: Damnation, the second CG film in the Resident Evil series, released in 2012
- Biohazard level 2, category to distinguish the severity of biological agents
