= Stupid Never Dies =

2026 video game

- Developer: GPTRACK50
- Publishers: GPTRACK50; Sega
- Director: Eiichiro Sasaki
- Producers: Hiroyuki Kobayashi; Tsukasa Takenaka
- Designers: Makoto Hashimoto; Fumiaki Iwaoka
- Programmers: Shinya Shigeyoshi; Sasuke Shimoyama
- Artist: Genseki Tanaka
- Writers: Teruhiro Shimogawa; Takeshi Yamazaki
- Composers: Varon Chase Bantug; Rei Kondoh; Haruno Ito; Yuta Yamaguchi
- Engine: Unreal Engine 5
- Platforms: PlayStation 5; Windows
- Release: October 21, 2026
- Genres: Action role-playing, roguelike
- Mode: Single-player

Stupid Never Dies is a 2026 action role-playing game with roguelike elements developed by GPTRACK50, the studio founded by former Capcom producer, Hiroyuki Kobayashi. It was published by GPTRACK50 and Sega for PlayStation 5 and Windows on October 21, 2026. The player controls Davy, a weak zombie in a world ruled by monsters, who descends through a dungeon to revive a frozen human woman. It is the studio's first game.

The game was announced at The Game Awards 2025 and developed over about three years. Reviews at launch were polarized: critics generally praised its colorful pop-punk art style and the variety offered by its monster transformations, while some found the combat and roguelike progression less satisfying.

== Gameplay ==
Stupid Never Dies is an action game where the player fights through randomized dungeon floors as Davy, a zombie. Davy grows stronger by defeating enemies, collecting items, and also biting monsters to take on their abilities. Transformations into monster forms, called styles, can each be used for a limited number of floors before they expire, which pushes the player to switch between them.

=== Plot ===
In the game's backstory, almost all of humanity has been wiped out by a monster uprising led by a being called KOM. The monsters leave the surface of the Earth to explore dungeon realms beneath its surface, leaving behind zombies that were considered weak. Davy, a weak zombie, finds Julia, a college student who froze to death in a shop freezer and falls in love with her. To revive her, Davy sets out to defeat the other monsters and recover humanity's lost knowledge from the dungeon.

== Development ==
Kobayashi began working on the game after leaving Capcom in March 2022. The team included other Capcom veterans, including director Eiichiro Sasaki. The developers said that it took them only about three years to make the game, shorter than what they felt was the normal five to six years for a game of its scale. The game was built inside of Unreal Engine 5, but used a stylized and hand-drawn look instead of the photorealistic visuals that the engine could support.

Stupid Never Dies was first announced at The Game Awards 2025 for release in 2026. GPTRACK50 confirmed that Sega would co-publish the game and set its release for October 21, 2026.

== Reception ==
Reception

Aggregate scores
Aggregator	Score
Metacritic	(PC) 66/100 (PS5) 65/100
OpenCritic	55% recommend

The PC and PlayStation 5 versions of Stupid Never Dies both received "mixed or average" reviews from critics, according to the review aggregation website Metacritic. Fellow review aggregator OpenCritic assessed that the game received fair approval, being recommended by 55% of critics.

Reviews published at launch were polarized, ranging from mixed to positive. CG Magazine's Zubi Khan praised Stupid Never Dies, calling the game a "breath of rotten fresh air" and noted that the game tried using new mechanics where most games are currently playing it safe. Khan also praised the game's time limit, noting that it grew on him as he played more. RPG Site's Josh Torres described the game as something "worth experiencing", praising its visual identity and cultural spirit, but criticizing gameplay decisions that made the game more repetitive. Couching his criticism though, Torres also noted that he thought highly that the game tried new things, even if it did not always come together.

Polygon's Giovanni Colantonio wrote that Stupid Never Dies was "easily the worst game of 2026". Colantonio criticized the game for "brazenly and literally" relying on the women in refrigerators trope and described the feel of the combat as "off across the board". Colantonio wrote that, even if the combat were somehow to be fixed, it would still be taking place in an "ugly story that could not be less suited for our current cultural moment".
