= Dragon's Dogma Online =

2015 video game

- Developer: Capcom
- Publisher: Capcom
- Director: Kento Kinoshita
- Producer: Minae Matsukawa
- Designer: Ryo Uno
- Writer: Kazushige Nojima
- Composers: Tadayoshi Makino; Azusa Kato
- Engine: MT Framework
- Platforms: PlayStation 3; PlayStation 4; Microsoft Windows
- Release: JP: August 31, 2015
- Genre: Massively multiplayer online role-playing
- Mode: Multiplayer

Dragon's Dogma Online (Note: Doragonzu Doguma Onrain (Japanese: ドラゴンズドグマ オンライン)) was a massively multiplayer online role-playing game (MMORPG) developed and published by Capcom for PlayStation 3, PlayStation 4 and Microsoft Windows in 2015; As of 2019, the servers have been shut down. A follow-up to the 2012 action role-playing game Dragon's Dogma, the game had the player take the role of an "Arisen" in service to the White Dragon, charged with defending the land of Lestania from monster attacks. Gameplay carried over the basic battle and Pawn companion systems from Dragon's Dogma while incorporating features of the MMORPG genre.

The game was conceived in 2012 alongside Dark Arisen, an expanded version of Dragon's Dogma. Development was delayed into 2013 due to the development of Dark Arisen. Returning staff included director Kento Kinoshita, producer Minae Matsukawa and composer Tadayoshi Makino. The scenario was written by Kazushige Nojima, noted for his work on the Final Fantasy series. The game reached one million downloads within a month of its release, and was positively reviewed.

== Gameplay ==
A player character fighting a dragon, a powerful boss enemy

Dragon's Dogma Online was a massively multiplayer online role-playing game (MMORPG) where players take on the role of the "Arisen", a warrior of the White Dragon who defends the land of Lestania from monsters. The Arisen is a customizable avatar created by the player at the beginning of the game, with their gender, physique and other features such as their voice being customizable. The game's hub is the White Dragon Shrine, with the rest of Lestania being available for exploration following the opening quest. Players progressed through the game by completing quests, which were accepted from the game's non-playable characters and divided into three categories; main quests connected to the central narrative, World Quests which were multiplayer-exclusive quests where up to eight players would cooperate during the quest; and Solo Quests which one player can complete. Quests gave experience and monetary rewards, and were gated based on the Arisen's current experience level.

The Arisen uses a character class, which unlock different combat and support options to use in battle, in addition to giving passive abilities. The basic class types are the "Fighter", close-range melee-based character builds focusing on attacking; the "Hunter", which can attack from a distance using bow and arrow; the "Priest", which specialises in healing and magic; and the "Tank", which has high defence abilities and can draw enemy attention. Players choose a class upon creating their Arisen character, and can change their job at the White Dragon Shrine. Some quests the player can complete are exclusive to certain classes.

Combat uses a similar real-time action-based battle system to the original Dragon's Dogma. Encountering enemies during exploration, and have particular vulnerabilities to different classes; some enemies are giants which can be climbed by the Arisen. Monsters have varying experience levels, which affect how much damage the Arisen can deal during combat. Each enemy has weak points which can be attacked for high damage, with some boss encounters relying on these mechanics. Each enemy has a fatigue and stamina meter, both relating to their energy and attack power. Depleting and manipulating these meters allow players to deal higher damage. Smaller enemies can be grappled and held down by allied combatants.

Alongside the Arisen, players create a human-like companion dubbed a Pawn to accompany them on their quest. Like the Arisen, the Pawn is a customizable avatar summoned into the world at the beginning of the game, assigned a gender, general appearance and class. The Pawn accompanies the Arisen on their quests, and aids them in combat. When knocked out in battle, the Pawn can be revived within a short time. If allowed to completely pass out, they are removed from the battlefield and retreat to a place in the world where Pawns gather, where the player can summon them again.

== Synopsis ==
Dragon's Dogma Online takes place in the land of Lestania. The overall narrative, focused on the roles in the world of five powerful dragons, was originally planned out in five story phases or "seasons". Due to the discontinuation of the game, the storyline had to finish at the third chapter.

For as long as its people can remember, Lestania has been protected by the White Dragon, who helped humanity prosper until a Golden Dragon challenged it to combat three hundred years prior to the game's opening. After three days of continuous battle, the Golden Dragon was killed, but the White Dragon was seriously injured during the battle. To compensate for its weakened state, the White Dragon turns select humans into "Arisen", warriors who share the White Dragon's power and carry out its will in defending Lestania. The performance and adherence to the White Dragon's will is referred to as the "Dragon's Dogma". The player character, a newly created Arisen, is commanded by the White Dragon to defend Lestania from monster attacks, which have increased as the White Dragon's power wanes. An Arisen also has the potential to become a new Dragon when needed.

The initial phase of the story focuses on the Arisen confronting the failure of a key defensive fortress that has kept monsters and demons at bay for centuries. The monsters, having constructed a powerful airship dubbed the Ark, are able to launch powerful attacks on Lestania, forcing the Arisen and the White Dragon's army to fight for survival. It is eventually revealed that an evil alchemist called Diamantes has recreated the Golden Dragon as a weapon for the monster army. Infiltrating the ruined city of Margoda, the Arisen and their party defeat both Diamantes and his Golden Dragon, stalling the monster invasion. This victory prompts the White Dragon to awake for the first time in centuries, prompting general rejoicing in Lestania. Their ally Leo, the planned successor of the White Dragon's power, leaves for other lands.

The second story phase begins six months later. The Arisen helps a young amnesiac girl named Cecily, defending her from a black knight who seeks her death. Coinciding with her arrival is a fungus-like blight which begins infecting Lestania. Cecily eventually regains her memories, revealing herself to be an Arisen serving the Spirit Wilmia, guardian to the neighbouring realm of Findam. Travelling to Findam, they find the blight has infected both Wilmia and the magical trees which maintain the land's balance. While the Great Tree is purified, the Arisen's party are forced to kill the despairing Wilmia to encourage the birth of a new dragon. Their task complete, the Arisen's group returns to the purified Lestania.

The third story phase begins when the White Dragon's domain is attacked by the "Dragon's Eye", a powerful projection from an evil dragon currently ruling the nation of Acker Chelan after killing its native Fire Dragon. The Arisen and their companions are kidnapped by the power, arriving to find Acker Chelan in a state of apathetic despair after years under the evil dragon's rule. Acker Chelan's last hope is Ned; as an Arisen and last surviving prince of the land's royal line, he is destined to become the next Fire Dragon. The Arisen works with Ned and Acker Chelan's surviving resistance force to overthrow the evil dragon and its monster armies.

The Arisen and their allies are then confronted by the black knight, who is served by Leo. The fourth Water Dragon has been defeated, and the black knight's master the Black Dragon is preparing a full-scale invasion. In the final section of the game, the Arisen and the White Dragon unite the power of the remaining Dragons. Leo also surrenders his power of the Water Dragon to the Arisen, and with their united powers defeats the Black Dragon. In the epilogue, the Arisen is chosen as the revitalised White Dragon's successor.

== Development ==
The concept for Dragon's Dogma Online was created in 2012 following the release of the original Dragon's Dogma. Capcom received a lot of comments from players who wanted to play together using a full multiplayer option, which was not present in Dragon's Dogma despite it sporting online elements through its Pawn sharing systems. Due to the development efforts invested in Dark Arisen, an expanded version of the original game, production on Dragon's Dogma Online had to be halted. Rather than a true sequel, Dragon's Dogma Online was designed as an expansion and refinement of the original concept.

The producer Minae Matsukawa and director Kento Kinoshita had previously worked on Dark Arisen. Hiroyuki Kobayashi acted as executive producer. The development team were carried over from Dragon's Dogma. The scenario was written by Kazushige Nojima, who had gained fame due to his writing work on the Final Fantasy and Kingdom Hearts series. Nojima was brought on board the project in 2013 by Matsukawa, who had worked with him on Last Ranker. The music was composed by Tadayoshi Makino, who worked on the original game, and Azusa Kato, who worked on Resident Evil 6 and Sengoku Basara 4. Dragon's Dogma Online was Makino's last project for Capcom before going freelance. Acting as music director for the project, he found composing the music challenging despite the established style of Dragon's Dogma, as he needed to both appeal to series fans and draw in newcomers.

The aim was to recreate the gameplay systems of Dragon's Dogma within the MMORPG genre. While a monthly fee was considered, Capcom decided to make the game free-to-play so as to increase its potential player base. While the concepts of the Arisen and Pawn were carried over directly from Dragon's Dogma, the rest of the game was new. The scenario was written as a set of seasons similar to a television series, planned for release over five years. The game was Capcom's first MMORPG, which led to several issues creating a sustainable online server and multiplayer structure while also preserving the gameplay systems of Dragon's Dogma. The game runs on an updated version of Capcom's MT Framework, which they had previously used for Dragon's Dogma.

Dragon's Dogma Online and its platforms PlayStation 3, PlayStation 4 and Microsoft Windows were first announced in January 2015. The game supports cross-platform play between its console and PC versions. The cross-platform feature was used so people could interact with each other no matter what system they used. The game was released on August 31, 2015, preceded by alpha and beta testing periods. The game came in standard and limited editions. While Capcom attempted to keep the game running to satisfy all players, this became increasingly difficult. In July 2019, the company announced that the game service would be discontinued on December 5 of that year.

== Reception ==
Reception

Review score
Publication	Score
Famitsu	35/40

The Limited Edition of Dragon's Dogma Online for PlayStation 3 debuted in Japanese game sales charts in fourth place with sales of over 29,000 units. The PS3 version reached twelfth place with over 8,000 units sold. Across all platforms, the game received over 700,000 downloads a day after its release. Within ten days of its release, the game had received one million downloads in Japan.
