= Dino Crisis 2 =

2000 action-adventure game

- North American PlayStation cover art
- Developer: Capcom Production Studio 4
- Publisher: Capcom: EU: Virgin Interactive (PS)
- Director: Shu Takumi
- Producer: Hiroyuki Kobayashi
- Artist: Kazunori Tazaki
- Writers: Noboru Sugimura; Yosuke Hirano; Kishiko Miyagi
- Composers: Sayaka Fujita; Makoto Tomozawa
- Series: Dino Crisis
- Platforms: PlayStation, Windows
- Release: PlayStation: JP: September 13, 2000; NA: September 20, 2000; EU: November 24, 2000; Windows: JP: March 1, 2002; NA: August 20, 2002; EU: April 4, 2003
- Genre: Action-adventure
- Mode: Single-player

Dino Crisis 2 (Note: Japanese: ディノクライシス2, Hepburn: Dino Kuraishisu Tsū) is a 2000 action-adventure game developed by Capcom Production Studio 4 and published by Capcom for the PlayStation. It is the second installment in the Dino Crisis series, with designer Shu Takumi taking over as game director from Shinji Mikami from the first game. The narrative continues the story of special operative Regina, who must deal with the fallout of a time-distorting event which transports a research base and the surrounding area through time. Regina and team leader Dylan Morton must battle against dinosaurs in order to find a way to get back to the present.

Dino Crisis 2 forgoes its predecessor's survival horror gameplay in favor of more arcade-style action elements. These include a wide variety of weapons and "Extinction Points" dropped by enemies, which can buy and upgrade the player's gear. These changes are accompanied by the inclusion of many of the abandoned ideas for the first title, with many more enemy-types and a greater number of enemies appearing on screen at once, creating a more claustrophobic experience. Forgoing 3D environments and using pre-rendered backgrounds allowed for the game to be set in a jungle, a scrapped idea from the first game due to technical limitations.

Upon release, Dino Crisis 2 was a critical and commercial success, selling 1.19 million copies on PlayStation, although this was less than its predecessor. Critics found the game to be far less derivative of similar Capcom series Resident Evil, with its action elements, atmosphere, and backgrounds being praised. Some reviewers were mixed on the lack of survival horror elements, although it was still described as scary due to the intensity of dinosaur encounters. The game was ported to Windows in 2002 while a PlayStation 2 version was announced but never released. In January 2025, Dino Crisis 2 and its predecessor were re-released on GOG.com with support for Windows 10 and Windows 11, as well as 4K resolution and modern gamepads. The GOG version of Dino Crisis and Dino Crisis 2 were both released onto Steam in February 2026.

== Gameplay ==
Dylan firing on a Velociraptor

Dino Crisis 2 is an action-adventure game that uses predetermined camera angles. Capcom Production Studio 4 changed the series' focus from the survival horror of the first Dino Crisis by creating a more action-packed arcade-style experience that featured more open areas, greater varieties of weapons and enemies and less emphasis on puzzles.

As players kill dinosaurs in succession, countering attacks and avoiding damage in areas, they can earn "Extinction Points" a form of in-game currency that tally up as player moves between locations. Throughout the game, the player can locate and use computer stations that act as a save point where players can save and load games. They can also spend Extinction Points on new weapons, upgrades, health packs and ammunition. There are also bandages (used to stem bleeding). This type of injury occurs when a player takes damage from certain attacks, and it results in slow draining of the health bar.

There are two forms of weapons in the game, main and sub-weapons; the player can only equip one of each at a time. Main weapons provide the most damage and are used for the majority of attacks, for example shotguns, flamethrowers and rifles whereas sub-weapons are used to get past obstacles, like the machete for cutting plant vines and the firewall gun that creates a temporary wall of fire against foes. Over the course of the game players switch roles between Regina and Dylan, the two have different weapons, making some passages blocked for one but accessible for the other.

Among the action-adventure gameplay are sections of on rails shooting, such as a chase where the player shoots at dinosaurs that are chasing an automatically driven vehicle and, like the previous game, several puzzles. Throughout the game, the player finds data files and documents that progress the story and give details of certain areas. Hidden "Dino Files" can also be found; these go into detail about each dinosaur in the game. Upon collecting all the available Dino Files, the player is granted unlimited ammunition for weapons on the next play through.

=== Extra Crisis ===
Upon completion of the main game, there is an unlockable mode known as Extra Crisis with two gameplay modes: "Dino Colosseum" and "Dino Duel". Colosseum is a survival mode where a chosen character with their own pre-set weapons fight off series of attacks by certain dinosaurs, the larger and more deadly being the latter. Upon completion the player is graded and awarded a trophy on how well they performed. Dino Duel is a mode that allows the player to take control of a dinosaur and battle another in the style of a fighting game. Completion of the game on harder difficulties allows more characters and dinosaurs to become available for purchase, using the final Extinction Points gathered from that play through. These include Gail and Rick, two characters from the first game. Dinosaurs can also be used in Dino Colosseum, but they must be unlocked by completing the game in normal or hard mode.

== Characters ==
- Regina (Stephanie Morgenstern) - A member of Secret Operations Raid Team (SORT), Regina is the only returning character from Dino Crisis that features in the main story. She is extremely intelligent, and is skeptical of Dylan's abilities at the outset, calling him "Mr. Barbarian", before going it alone.
- Dylan Morton (Gabriel Hogan) - Part of the Tactical Reconnaissance and Acquisition Team (TRAT), an off-record covert group of shady characters recruited from the United States Army Special Forces. They focus on subversive activities, e.g. jailbreaks and insurgency.
- Paula Morton (Lisa Yamanaka) - A recurring character. This teenage girl is part of a helmeted syndicate that is hostile towards Regina and Dylan. She appears childlike and is unable to form complete sentences. Paula shares a special connection with Dylan.
- David Fork (Eric Hempsall) - Another prominent TRAT member, David is a heavy weapons specialist and Dylan's friend. He is separated from the others during the opening cinematic. David is boastful, loyal, and can fly a helicopter.
- Colonel Dylan Morton - Appearing as a hologram at the end of the game, Colonel Morton plays an important role in the story. He reveals the truth about the helmeted attackers and what went wrong with the experiment.

== Plot ==
On May 10, 2010, the United States Army's TRAT unit travels through a Time Gate to investigate the time-displaced Edward City and its surrounds, rescue its 1300 survivors, and retrieve data on the Third Energy Project. Intelligence operative Regina is brought along as an adviser due to her past experiences. During insertion, the team's camp is attacked by a pack of Velociraptor, leaving Lieutenant Dylan Morton, Regina and TRAT operative David as the only survivors. The Velociraptors flee when a Tyrannosaurus rex attacks the group. David damages the Tyrannosaur's eye with a rocket-propelled grenade to ensure Dylan and Regina's escape. Regina returns to the transport ship while Dylan heads into the jungle, spotting a mysterious helmeted figure while investigating a military facility. Upon arrival, he is confronted by the wounded T. rex. While escaping to the barracks, he is shot at by helmeted attackers. Later, he attempts to retrieve a key card, triggering a security alert that imprisons him.

Regina receives Dylan's distress call and rescues him. While rescuing Dylan after defeating an Allosaurus, Regina captures one of the mysterious attackers, a blonde teenage girl who is unable to speak. When they return to their ship, they find the engine room ransacked, stranding them in time, while the teenage girl exhibits a familiar connection to Dylan and tries to reach out to him, leaving him confused.

At the Research Facility teeming with Oviraptor and a thieving Compsognathus, Dylan discovers human containment chambers and a starter battery for the ship in order to get it mobile. Dylan returns to find the girl has escaped and theorizes that the helmeted attackers could be from a different time period. They use the repaired ship to reach the offshore Third Energy facility.

Regina uses a diving suit at the facility to investigate the underwater reactor, battling Mosasaurus and a Plesiosaurus along the way. Once topside, she and Dylan receive a distress call from David, who has found survivors at Edward City. First, they traverse a volcano infested with Inostrancevia and a nesting site full of angry Allosaurus, and then come across a dying Triceratops fawn. Dylan and Regina are disgusted as to who would do such a thing, and then, the fawn cries out, alerting adult Triceratops which chase them through the forest via a truck. However, after crashing into a grassy lowland and surviving a raptor attack thanks to David's use of a helicopter, Dylan and Regina arrive too late. Upon splitting up, Dylan engages the T. rex with a tank before being jumped by another helmeted figure. The blonde girl saves Dylan from the figure - accidentally dropping a silver necklace in the process - and runs away. Deciding they have no business at Edward City anymore, Regina heads to a missile silo in the jungle.

Regina discovers the Third Energy data at the silo, but is confronted by the Tyrannosaurus who is in turn attacked and killed by a gargantuan Giganotosaurus. The Giganotosaurus follows Regina inside the missile silo, causing damage that triggers a countdown to launch. Regina ignites gas vents to incinerate the head of the Giganotosaurus, rendering it comatose. Regina stops the countdown, but the beast awakens from its coma and smashes the missile to the ground, destroying the base. While evacuating Regina, David and Dylan open the doorway on the river: suddenly, Dylan is attacked and injured by an Allosaurus. In order to save him, David sacrifices himself by throwing Dylan into the river before getting eaten by the Allosaurus.

Downriver, Dylan arrives at another research facility and encounters the blonde-haired girl. Inside, she plays a hologram recording of an elderly Dylan from 2055 and learns the origins of the disaster. An overload in 2009 caused alterations in the Cretaceous Period, resulting in an alternate timeline where humanity would not exist. To fix this, an international organization devised the "Noah's Ark Plan" - utilizing Time Gate technology, they would transport the living organisms of the Cretaceous three million years in the future into a similar environment, where they could thrive unaffected by the alterations, and then be returned after the distortions had passed. However, when the Noah's Ark team attempted to return, the gate overloaded and was destroyed, stranding both the dinosaurs and humans in the future; it is this future that Edward City and the TRAT team were sent to. The helmeted attackers were the only remaining children of the survivors, who were placed in special life support chambers to heal and grow. The side-effects of the chambers cost the children's ability to speak but allowed them to co-exist with and want to defend the dinosaurs. Dylan also learns that the blonde girl is his future daughter, Paula. The hologram tells Dylan there is a basic gate they can use to go home, but it will work only once, and to take Paula with him.

The facility's self destruct system is activated by the sole surviving helmeted figure. Paula flees and the helmeted figure falls to their death when the Giganotosaurus suddenly attacks. Dylan incinerates the beast with an orbital laser. While attempting to evacuate with Regina, an earth tremor leaves Paula trapped under falling equipment. Unable to free her and with the building about to explode, Dylan stays with his daughter, telling Regina to return home with the Third Energy data and save them at an earlier time period.

== Development and release ==
Hiroyuki Kobayashi worked as a planner on the first game, and Dino Crisis 2 marked his debut as a producer. Dino Crisis was developed as a survival horror game, like Capcom's Resident Evil series, whereas Dino Crisis 2 was developed as an action-adventure game. According to Kobayashi, the most difficult aspect of the project was creating a game that would be "completely different" from Dino Crisis and the Resident Evil games. He said, "It isn't all that interesting just killing dinosaurs so we wondered how we could make it more fun". To help achieve this goal, the development team added the point system and sub-weapons. Like its predecessor, the dinosaurs' movements and sounds were based on modern animals. The team referenced present-day tropical forests in designing the game's prehistoric environments, and also spent considerable time to get the lighting right, as much of the game is spent outdoors in daylight. Unlike the original game, environments in Dino Crisis 2 consist of 2D pre-rendered graphics.

In terms of the size of Dino Crisis 2's development team, director and writer Shu Takumi stated that there was around 50 people working on the game.

In the U.S., Dino Crisis 2 was released on September 21, 2000, for the PlayStation. A PlayStation 2 version had been announced, but was never released.

== Reception ==
Reception

Aggregate scores
Aggregator	Score	
Aggregator	PC	PS
GameRankings	57%	81%
Metacritic	N/A	86/100

Review scores
Publication	Score	
Publication	PC	PS
4Players	80%	88%
AllGame	N/A	4/5
CNET Gamecenter	N/A	8/10
Electronic Gaming Monthly	N/A	8.5/10, 9/10, 9/10
Eurogamer	N/A	9/10
Famitsu	N/A	8/10, 8/10, 8/10, 8/10
Game Informer	N/A	8.75/10
GameFan	N/A	89/100, 88/100, 82/100 (Note: In GameFan, three critics each gave it an individual score.)
GameRevolution	N/A	B
GameSpot	N/A	9.2/10
IGN	N/A	9.3/10
Jeuxvideo.com	9/20	15/20
Next Generation	N/A	2/5
Official U.S. PlayStation Magazine	N/A	4.5/5
The Cincinnati Enquirer	N/A	4/5

The PlayStation version received "generally favorable reviews" according to the review aggregation website Metacritic. Four writers discussed the game in the Japanese magazine Famitsu. While noting it was more action-oriented than the earlier game, they also found it less difficult and still worth going for repeated playthroughs. One reviewer found the constant stream of weaker dinosaurs showing up as being frustrating, but still found it intoxicating to continuously blast away at them.

In his review, Ben Stahl of GameSpot commented that the first Dino Crisis was as if Capcom "replaced the zombies with carnivorous dinosaurs" for a Resident Evil spin-off. However, he found Dino Crisis 2 "an original, enjoyable experience that can no longer be considered just another entry into the survival-horror genre", as it "avoids the stereotypes of the genre and delivers one of the most refreshing takes on the action-adventure genre to date." Douglass C. Perry of IGN concurred that the game had been "stripped of its slow-paced Resident Evil shell and its haunting, creepy shockeroo tricks." Perry had even more praise for the game, saying, "The creatures and the design are both excellent, and the jungle backgrounds, and especially the underwater environments, are simply top-notch." GamePro's review commented that "sound is solid, with an unobtrusive musical score that blends well with gaming effects, i.e. the telltale rustle of foliage preceding a raptor's leap for your throat isn't drowned out by J-pop." (Note: GamePro gave the PlayStation version 4.5/5 for graphics, two 4/5 scores each for sound and control, and 5/5 for fun factor.) Edge gave it six out of ten, saying, "What Dino Crisis 2 does exceptionally well is take all the elements from the survival horror pantheon and hone them for popular consumption. [...] Even the underwater sequence, which is well presented and excellently executed, is not enough to submerge the feeling that corridor-based survival horror has hit something of a creative dead end."

Marc Saltzman of The Cincinnati Enquirer stated, "Overall, Dino Crisis 2 is a fantastic sequel that delivers more adrenaline-pumping action, beautiful scenery and a hearty dose of terror." Saltzman added that "tasks such as running around looking for keys can be tedious. And some of the action portions of the game can get repetitive, too." A.A. White of GameRevolution felt the "arcade-like" gameplay "detracts a bit from the whole survival-horror theme." He also noted that "the back and forth gameplay gets tired after a while," and that it can be "very easy to get distracted from the storyline and get sucked into the process of amassing an arsenal." Greg Orlando of NextGen, however, said, "Beautiful graphics, solid control, and furious action still can't overcome the dull protagonists and severely foreshortened running time."

Like its predecessor, Dino Crisis 2 was a commercial success, with the PlayStation version selling 1.19 million units worldwide. Capcom would later re-release the game for PC, and bring it to PlayStation Network in the US and Japan.

The PlayStation version was a runner-up for GameSpot's annual "Best PlayStation Game" and "Best Adventure Game" awards.
