= Dragon's Dogma (TV series) =

Japanese anime web television series

- Promotional teaser poster

ドラゴンズドグマ (Doragonzudoguma)
- Genre: Adventure; Dark fantasy
- Created by: Capcom
- Original net animation
- Directed by: Shinya Sugai
- Produced by: Tomohisa Nishimura
- Written by: Kurasumi Sunayama
- Music by: Tadayoshi Makino
- Studio: Sublimation
- Licensed by: Netflix
- Released: September 17, 2020
- Runtime: 19–32 minutes
- Episodes: 7
- icon

Dragon's Dogma (Japanese: ドラゴンズドグマ, Hepburn: Doragonzudoguma) is an American-Japanese adult dark fantasy original net animation (ONA) series based on the 2012 video game of the same name by Capcom. Directed by Shinya Sugai, the series was released via Netflix on September 17, 2020.

== Characters ==
Ethan (イーサン)
Voiced by: Yūichi Nakamura (Japanese); Greg Chun (English)
Hannah (ハンナ)
Voiced by: Nana Mizuki (Japanese); Erica Mendez (English)
Olivia (オリビア)
Voiced by: Miyuki Sawashiro (Japanese); Cristina Vee (English)
Dragon (ドラゴン)
Voiced by: Takayuki Sugō (Japanese); David Lodge (English)
Louis (ルイ)
Voiced by: Yūko Sanpei (Japanese); Jeannie Tirado (English)
Salai (サライ)
Voiced by: Suzuko Mimori (Japanese); Ryan Bartley (English)

== Production ==
The series is animated by Sublimation. Shinya Sugai serves as director while he, Taiki Sakurai, Takashi Kitahara, and Hiroyuki Kobayashi serve as executive producers. Kurasumi Sunayama is the writer of the scripts while Kaoru Nishimura is designer of characters. Original game composer Tadayoshi Makino serves as the show's composer. The series consists of seven episodes.

== Episodes ==
No.	Title	Directed by	Written by	Original release date
1	"Wrath"	Shinya Sugai	Kurasumi Sunayama	September 17, 2020
Father-to-be Ethan leaves his wife behind and takes orphan Louis to hunt for food in the mountains, where a pack of ferocious wolves set upon them.
2	"Gluttony"	Shinya Sugai	Kurasumi Sunayama	September 17, 2020
Cassardis lies in ruins. When a magical Pawn revives Ethan, he vows revenge, embarking on a quest to slay the dragon that destroyed his world.
3	"Envy"	Shinya Sugai	Kurasumi Sunayama	September 17, 2020
Ethan and Hannah aid a traveling party being ambushed by goblins. The groups make camp together, but a predatory griffin swoops in from above.
4	"Sloth"	Shinya Sugai	Kurasumi Sunayama	September 17, 2020
The pair make their way through a cavern that once housed a bustling narcotics operation. Deeper inside, a towering hydra stalks the depths.
5	"Greed"	Shinya Sugai	Kurasumi Sunayama	September 17, 2020
Ethan and Hannah reunite with royal guards Simon and Balthazar, agreeing to help them destroy a greedy lich who commands an army of undead.
6	"Lust"	Shinya Sugai	Kurasumi Sunayama	September 17, 2020
Hannah convinces Ethan to rest at an inn before marching on to the dragon's lair. In his room, a vision of his wife brings back Ethan's past.
7	"Pride"	Shinya Sugai	Kurasumi Sunayama	September 17, 2020
Ethan makes his way to the Tainted Mountain to face the dragon and reclaim his stolen heart, or die trying.

== Reception ==
On review aggregator website Rotten Tomatoes, the series holds an approval rating of 83% based on 6 reviews with an average rating of 5.9/10.

In a positive review, IGN's David Jagneaux wrote, "It's not the best video game adaptation ever...but it's a good debut that has room for growth with (hopefully) future seasons." Writing for The A.V. Club, Sam Barsanti called the series, "a fun, if forgettable video game adaptation." The Escapist's Jesse Lab responded more negatively, lamenting it as "a heartbreaking disappointment."
