= Dino Crisis (video game) =

1999 survival horror game

- European PlayStation cover art
- Developer: Capcom Production Studio 4 (Note: Ported to Dreamcast by Nextech.)
- Publisher: Capcom: PAL: Virgin Interactive
- Director: Shinji Mikami
- Producer: Shinji Mikami
- Designers: Shu Takumi; Kuniomi Matsushita; Hiroyuki Kobayashi
- Programmer: Ryuta Takahashi
- Artists: Kazunori Tazaki; Yasuyo Kondo; Yuichi Akimoto
- Composers: Makoto Tomozawa; Sayaka Fujita; Akari Kaida; Syun Nishigaki
- Series: Dino Crisis
- Platforms: PlayStation, Dreamcast, Windows
- Release: July 1, 1999: PlayStation; JP: July 1, 1999; NA: September 23, 1999; EU: October 29, 1999 Dreamcast; JP: September 6, 2000; NA: November 15, 2000; EU: December 22, 2000 Windows; EU: September 15, 2000; NA: December 4, 2000; JP: 2000
- Genre: Survival horror
- Mode: Single-player

Dino Crisis (Note: Japanese: ディノクライシス, Hepburn: Dino Kuraishisu) is a 1999 survival horror game developed and published by Capcom for the PlayStation. It is the first installment in the Dino Crisis series and was developed by the same team behind Capcom's Resident Evil series, including director Shinji Mikami. The story follows Regina, a special operations agent sent with a team to investigate a secluded island research facility. Finding it overrun with dinosaurs, Regina must fight through the facility to discover its secrets and escape alive with her team.

Instead of the pre-rendered backgrounds of the Resident Evil games that preceded it, Dino Crisis uses an original real-time engine with 3D environments. Gameplay features traditional survival horror mechanics including action and puzzles, and it was developed to have more consistent visceral terror with the dinosaurs being quick, intelligent, and violent. Capcom later marketed the game as "panic horror" as opposed to "survival horror" due to these design changes. The team used carnivorous animals as references for animating the dinosaurs and programming their behaviors. Mikami's vision was not completely fulfilled, as he wanted to develop more complex dinosaur artificial intelligence. However, he believed the team was able to create sufficiently detailed environments despite hardware limitations.

The PlayStation version sold more than 2.4 million copies. Critics drew comparisons to Resident Evil, with some describing it as "Resident Evil with dinosaurs". They also praised the game's intensity, graphics, and gameplay. Some criticized the lack of dinosaur variety, repetitive environments, and tedious puzzles. Dino Crisis was ported to Dreamcast and Windows in 2000, and was re-released for the PlayStation Network in 2006. Two versions for the Game Boy Color were in development, but both were cancelled. The game was re-released for PlayStation Plus Premium subscribers in October 2024 and made available for purchase on the PlayStation Store in November. In January 2025, Dino Crisis and Dino Crisis 2 were re-released on GOG.com with support for Windows 10 and Windows 11, as well as 4K resolution and modern gamepads. In February 2026, Dino Crisis and Dino Crisis 2 were released on Steam, both co-developed by GOG.com.

== Gameplay ==
Regina firing at a raptor which has been blocked off with a force field

Dino Crisis features survival horror gameplay that is very similar to Capcom's early Resident Evil titles. Regina can walk, run, turn, backpedal, push and climb objects, and perform a 180-degree turn. A map is available which will show Regina's location, destination, save points, and locked doors. Save points are rooms which will prompt the player to save upon exiting them. Some doors are locked by a D.D.K. (digital disk key) device. To open these doors, the player will need both a code disc and input disc which can then be used to decipher a code and unlock the door. There are also force fields of red beams throughout the complex which can be activated to block access to intruders.

Regina's inventory may include key items, weapons, ammo, and medical supplies—the latter two of which she can only hold a limited amount. She can also mix certain items in order to upgrade them or make completely new ones, such as anesthetic darts. These items can be stored in "emergency boxes", which need be unlocked with special items called "plugs" before they are usable. Each emergency box is color coded as either red, green, or yellow. Each box can access the contents of any other unlocked box of the same color.

The player can move with weapons drawn and use automatic targeting functions. Enemies can knock Regina's weapon out of her hand, at which point she'll have to retrieve it. Sometimes "DANGER" may flash on the screen in perilous situations, at which point the player should push all the controller buttons as rapidly as possible to survive. If Regina becomes injured, she will hold her arm or struggle to walk. Med Paks can be used to heal Regina's health. Sometimes a trail of blood may appear, indicating that Regina is bleeding and will continue to lose health. Hemostats can be used to stop bleeding injuries. Two types of medical supplies are available in the game: Med Paks, which heals player health, and Hemostats, which stop bleeding injuries. If Regina dies, the player may continue from the room she died in. After five "Continues" are exhausted, the player must continue from their last save point.

== Plot ==
In 2009, the Secret Operation Raid Team (S.O.R.T.) sends an agent, Tom, to infiltrate a research facility on Ibis Island in disguise as a researcher. He learns that Dr. Edward Kirk, a world-renowned scientist who was reported dead three years ago, is leading a secret weapons project within the facility. S.O.R.T. sends four agents (Regina, Gail, Rick, and Cooper) to search, apprehend, and acquire Kirk and return him to custody. The team arrives on the island under cover of darkness, dropping in via parachute from helicopter. Cooper is blown off course and lands in the jungle away from the others. Lost in the dark, he is chased down by a Tyrannosaurus rex and eaten unbeknownst to the rest of the team. The other three agents, unaware of his death, proceed with the mission.

Once inside the base, the agents discover the eviscerated and partially devoured corpses of security personnel and scientists. After splitting up to restore power to the facility, Gail goes missing. Whilst searching for him, Regina is confronted by a Velociraptor. Re-uniting with Rick, the two determine it was the dinosaurs that caused the bloodbath at the base. Although their mission to recover Dr. Kirk still stands, it is now more important to signal for a rescue. Regina sets out to activate the main antenna to contact their airlift. On her way, she is attacked by another Velociraptor and is rescued by Gail, who then leaves to continue searching for Dr. Kirk. After restoring communications, Regina heads back to the control room and they receive a signal on their communicators. Believing it might be Cooper or Tom in trouble, Rick wants to investigate. Gail shoots down the idea, wanting to follow up on a closed-circuit television sighting that might have been Kirk. The player must choose which course of action to follow.

If the player follows Gail, they go after an unknown man, but end up losing him. Rick then tells Regina that Tom's dead. If the player follows Rick, they come across Tom, badly injured and near death. Rick takes him to the medical room, however, a Velociraptor attacks them, but Tom sacrifices himself to kill it and save Rick. Later, Regina and the team manage to locate Kirk and apprehend him. As they are preparing to leave via helicopter, the T. rex returns and destroys the helicopter, forcing them to flee back into the base while Kirk manages to escape. Regina and Rick flee into the facility and locate keys to a watercraft, but find a vortex in the way of getting to it. Rick speculates this is the spacetime distortion that brought the dinosaurs back. The two split up to find an alternate route off the island, and Regina ends up being held at gunpoint by Dr. Kirk. He is about to kill her when the gun is shot out of his hand by Gail, and they arrest him again.

Kirk reveals that the dinosaurs were brought to their time by an experiment he was running using his Third Energy technology. A rift in space was created and a pocket of the island from their time was exchanged with the same from the past, bringing dinosaurs back into their time. Kirk then tells them that if the reactors are set to overload, the energy coming from them and the vortex should cancel each other out if they come into contact. After Regina gets the stabilizer and initializer and uses them to overload the reactors, the energy shakes the base, causing a vent to fall on Gail allowing Kirk to get free again. The team heads towards the waterway to escape the blast, but Gail says they still need to capture the doctor. He starts to hobble away on his gun to go after Kirk, and orders Regina and Rick to leave without him if he does not return in thirty minutes. Regina is given the choice to either go after Dr. Kirk with Gail, or escape with Rick.

Different endings are possible based on the choice the player makes. The endings all involve a battle with the T. rex and escaping the island via a watercraft or helicopter. If Regina chases Kirk, Gail reveals that the whole mission was a front and the government did not want Kirk, but instead wanted the Third Energy to use in warfare. After giving Regina a disk containing all the data for Third Energy, Gail dies from his injuries. Regina, Rick, and Dr. Kirk then escape the island. Another ending sees Regina knocking out Gail and leaving instead of chasing Dr. Kirk, allowing him to escape. In the game's best ending, Regina knocks out Gail and chases Kirk by herself, resulting in his capture and the team escaping by helicopter. Regina, regardless of ending, summarizes the fate of all the characters in an email to her superiors, then declaring herself ready for her next assignment.

== Development ==
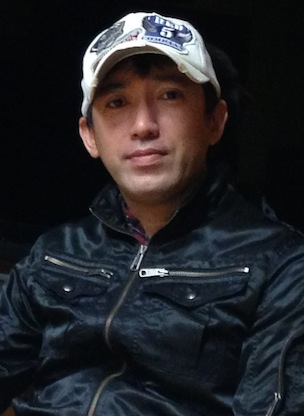
Producer and director Shinji Mikami, seen here in 2013

Dino Crisis was directed and produced by Shinji Mikami, and developed by a team dubbed Capcom Production Studio 4. It is a spiritual successor to Mikami's popular Resident Evil series, which Mikami and his team wanted to move away from the fantasy elements of and make something more real. He cited The Lost World: Jurassic Park and Aliens as influences, and liked dinosaurs because they were large, strong, fearsome, and violent. The game was developed and marketed as "panic horror" as opposed to the "survival horror" branding of Resident Evil. It was made to have more consistent fright, with the dinosaurs being more intelligent, quick, and able to chase the player room-to-room. Mikami described Resident Evil as "horror in the fun house" and Dino Crisis as more visceral horror akin to riding a roller coaster.

Dino Crisis utilizes an original 3D engine with real-time environments, as opposed to the pre-rendered backgrounds of the Resident Evil series. Mikami chose a real-time engine to enable better cinematic action and more dramatic character depictions that would otherwise be impossible. With the real-time engine came the challenge of hardware limitations, making it difficult for the team to create detailed environments. The team had to forego a jungle scene because of this issue. Mikami did however believe the team was able to create sufficiently detailed environments despite the hardware's polygon limitations. Like Resident Evil, the game takes place indoors in an enclosed environment. Mikami wanted to keep the claustrophobic feelings, thinking it was better to build fear.

Since it is unknown how dinosaurs moved in real life, the team had to use their imagination and animals such as crocodiles and dogs as reference. The animators first scanned in drawings, then used animation tools to see what was possible to animate. The dinosaur artificial intelligence was based on lions, tigers, and other carnivores that are not afraid of humans. Mikami's vision for the dinosaurs was not completely fulfilled. He wanted to include more complex dinosaur artificial intelligence, with the dinosaurs each having individual personalities that could understand the player's condition and ambush them. The dinosaur animations and cries also did not turn out as he originally envisioned them. The number of dinosaurs in the North American version was increased from the Japanese version, although the number of species remained the same.

Dino Crisis was first revealed at the 1999 Spring Tokyo Game Show. The game was initially released in Japan in July 1999, two months before Resident Evil 3: Nemesis. Ports were released for the Sega Dreamcast console and Windows platform in 2000. The Japanese PlayStation version of the game has a software-protection that detects if a mod-chip is installed in the console, refusing to start even if the CD-ROM is original. The protection can be bypassed disabling the mod-chip or using action-replay codes. A top-down interpretation of Dino Crisis was in development by UK company M4 for the Game Boy Color, but was cancelled. M4 would later develop Resident Evil Gaiden for the system instead. Another UK firm called Fluid Studios was also developing a version of the game for the Game Boy Color. It would have contained all four characters from the original version, as well as seven maps, a hundred different rooms, and five types of dinosaurs; this game was also canceled.

== Reception ==
Reception

Aggregate scores
Aggregator	Score		
Aggregator	Dreamcast	PC	PS
GameRankings	72%	61%	84%
Metacritic	74/100	59/100	N/A

Review scores
Publication	Score		
Publication	Dreamcast	PC	PS
AllGame	3.5/5	3/5	4/5
Computer and Video Games	N/A	N/A	5/5
Edge	N/A	N/A	8/10
Electronic Gaming Monthly	7.5/10	N/A	8.1/10
Eurogamer	7/10	5/10	N/A
Famitsu	31/40	N/A	10/10, 8/10, 8/10, 8/10
Game Informer	6.5/10	N/A	9/10
GamePro	4/5	N/A	4.5/5
GameRevolution	N/A	N/A	C+
GameSpot	7.1/10	5.6/10	8.5/10
GameSpy	7.5/10	53%	N/A
IGN	7.2/10	6.4/10	9.2/10
Next Generation	N/A	N/A	5/5
Official U.S. PlayStation Magazine	N/A	N/A	4/5

Dino Crisis was met with mostly positive reviews. Critics compared Dino Crisis to the Resident Evil series while also drawing comparisons to Jurassic Park and describing the game as "Resident Evil with dinosaurs". Despite these similarities, reviewers found the game "enhances and alters" the Resident Evil formula with "strength of its own merits". The game was a commercial success, being a bestseller in Japan. During its debut week in Japan, Dino Crisis achieved sales above 300,000 units, making it the country's best-selling game from July 14 through July 21. The PlayStation version of the game ultimately sold 2.4 million copies worldwide, and is listed as Capcom "Platinum Title".

Critics generally praised the action and intensity of the game, which was heightened by the real-time engine and soundtrack. GamePro found the game to have a great mix of action and strategy, with dinosaur AI that keeps the action fresh. IGN described the game as "vicious, flesh-tearing fright", noting the fast-paced gameplay during action sequences. Some praise was directed towards the realism of the game, with the dinosaur behaviors and bleeding mechanics noted. The real-time graphics were generally liked, with critics describing them as "sharp", "sterile", and "clean". GameSpot praised the character models, lighting effects, and found "the use of polygonal backgrounds enhances the feeling of fear even more than Resident Evil". The dinosaurs were a consistent point of discussion among critics. GamePro found the dinosaurs "imbued with an excellent AI that keeps the action fresh and exciting", although some found the variety of dinosaurs to be lacking. Despite the game being "90% Raptors", which IGN found not as scary as monsters from Resident Evil, they found the dinosaur sound effects to be well done.

Game Revolution had a more critical review of Dino Crisis than others, saying the game expanded on the worse elements of Resident Evil while also ruining the good elements. They were impressed by the graphics but thought the environments looked too similar and got boring after a short time. Overall, they believed the game to be worse than Resident Evil 2, pointing out the game's shorter length, more tedious puzzles, weaker action, and lesser scare factor.

The Dreamcast and Windows ports received mixed reviews from multiple sources, criticized for adding very little enhancements to take advantage of their superior hardware. The graphics were viewed as dated on Windows, with IGN calling it "choppy" and pointing out the poor resolution upscaling. The Dreamcast port was essentially identical to the PlayStation version, with a graphical advantage of not suffering from the texture-distortion effect produced by the PlayStation. On the Dreamcast, Resident Evil – Code: Veronica, another Capcom survival horror game, was viewed as a superior experience.

== Legacy ==
An action-shooter sequel titled Dino Crisis 2 was released for the PlayStation in 2000 to positive reception. In 2002, Capcom released Dino Stalker, a lightgun game for the PlayStation 2 to mixed reviews. Finally, an action-based game, Dino Crisis 3, was released in 2003 for the Xbox to mixed reviews. The protagonist of Dino Crisis, Regina, has been featured as a playable character in the tactical role-playing game Namco x Capcom for the PlayStation 2. Her outfit is also available to wear in Resident Evil 3: Nemesis and in Dead Rising 3 via downloadable content.
