= Resident Evil: Degeneration =

- Japanese theatrical release poster

Japanese name
- Kanji: バイオハザード ディジェネレーション
Transcriptions
- Revised Hepburn: Baiohazādo Dijenerēshon
- Directed by: Makoto Kamiya
- Written by: Shotaro Suga
- Story by: Hiroyuki Kobayashi; Yoshiaki Hirabayashi
- Based on: Resident Evil by Capcom
- Produced by: Hiroyuki Kobayashi
- Starring: Paul Mercier; Alyson Court; Laura Bailey; Roger Craig Smith
- Cinematography: Atsushi Doi; Yusaku Toyoshima
- Edited by: Ryūji Miyajima
- Music by: Tetsuya Takahashi
- Production companies: Digital Frontier; Capcom
- Distributed by: Sony Pictures Entertainment Japan
- Release date: October 17, 2008
- Running time: 96 minutes
- Country: Japan
- Language: English
- Box office: Japan: ¥43 million ($403,117 in 2008)

Resident Evil: Degeneration, known as Biohazard: Degeneration (Japanese: バイオハザード ディジェネレーション, Hepburn: Baiohazādo Dijenerēshon) in Japan, is a 2008 Japanese adult animated biopunk action horror film directed by Makoto Kamiya. It is the first full-length motion capture animation feature in Capcom's Resident Evil franchise. The film was made by Capcom in cooperation with Sony Pictures Entertainment Japan. Degeneration made its premiere at the 2008 Tokyo Game Show and was released theatrically on October 17, 2008.

Unlike the Resident Evil live-action film series, Degeneration is set within the same universe as the original video game series. The main characters are Leon S. Kennedy and Claire Redfield, who appear together for the first time since the 1998 game Resident Evil 2.

== Plot ==
In November 2005, Harvardville Airport falls victim to a T-virus attack both from inside the terminal and a crashed airliner. TerraSave worker Claire Redfield coincidentally runs into Senator Ron Davis, a vocal opponent of TerraSave, and they are forced to hide in the VIP lounge with Rani, niece of a TerraSave employee. By nightfall, the airport has been locked down by the local Special Response Team and the United States Army, aiding evacuated survivors. Officers Angela Miller and Greg Glenn are joined by federal agent Leon S. Kennedy. Claire's group is rescued; however, they are forced to leave the infected Greg. Trucks from pharmaceutical corporation WilPharma arrive to administer a T-virus vaccine they created, but are destroyed by explosives. Leon reveals that a terrorist has threatened to unleash the T-virus throughout the U.S. should government officials involved in its creation not be revealed by midnight.

Claire accompanies WilPharma Head Researcher Frederic Downing to their Harvardville research facility. Downing reveals plans to make a G-virus vaccine next, angering Claire because of its danger. Excusing himself, Downing leaves Claire in his office. Claire informs Leon about what Downing said and learns that he and Angela have found the house of her brother Curtis on fire. Downing phones Claire, warning her about a man who has activated a time bomb. Claire spots Curtis in the building's central garden, then the bomb detonates.

Leon and Angela arrive at the facility and split up. Leon reunites with Claire, while Angela reunites with Curtis, who reveals the American government's involvement in covering up Raccoon City's destruction. Having injected himself with the G-virus, he mutates and kills a squad of army rangers. Leon saves Angela as the atrium garden begins to fall apart, with the wreckage temporarily crushing Curtis. The computer system then incinerates the building to prevent the viruses from spreading. Angela and Leon jump into a pool of water to avoid being burned alive. After shooting a glass partition to avoid drowning, the two find themselves in an underground area. Meanwhile, Claire makes it to the command center, attempting to halt a biohazard alarm and open the building. However, the detection of Curtis triggers an outbreak containment failsafe in which the laboratory falls into an abyss to trap any infection.

Curtis attacks them, seeing Leon as a threat and Angela as a mate. Curtis regains control, telling Angela to run before losing himself again. As the sections are ejected, Leon and Angela evade Curtis, only to hang from a broken catwalk. About to fall, Curtis grabs hold of Angela's leg but is shot by Leon and falls to his death. In the aftermath, Claire accuses Senator Davis of orchestrating everything to improve WilPharma stock. Leon reveals Davis is innocent; making Claire realize that Downing is the actual mastermind of the T-vaccine's destruction, the bombing of the research building, and the recent bioterrorism incidents. Meanwhile, Downing talks to General Grandé, a client of his eager to buy the T-virus now that news reports have revealed its potential, though he warns against using the G-virus. Waiting for a contact to sell WilPharma information to, Downing mistakes a car containing Leon and Claire for his contact; he is later arrested by the police for his crimes.

Downing confesses to being a former Umbrella researcher who stole both viruses, escaped prior to the Raccoon City incident and created his current identity. Downing used his alias to sell the viruses to potential customers while researching the vaccine. Angela realizes Downing manipulated Curtis, but Claire notes that even though this does not clear his name, he wanted to prevent another Raccoon City just like she, Leon, and Angela do.

Meanwhile, news reports reveal Davis has resigned from office over allegations of insider stock trading with WilPharma stocks. A newspaper draped over Davis' face reveals that another company, Tricell Incorporated, has offered to purchase the now-bankrupt WilPharma. At this point, Davis is revealed to have been assassinated by Tricell, with the company deleting all of Davis's computer files on WilPharma and recovering G-virus samples from Curtis's corpse.

== Cast ==
- Paul Mercier as Leon S. Kennedy
- Alyson Court as Claire Redfield
- Laura Bailey as Angela Miller
- Roger Craig Smith as Curtis Miller
- Crispin Freeman as Frederic Downing
- Mary Elizabeth McGlynn as Rani's aunt
- Michelle Ruff as Rani Chawla
- Michael Sorich as Senator Ron Davis
- Steven Blum as Greg Glenn
- Salli Saffioti as Ingrid Hunnigan

== Production ==
Sony Pictures Entertainment, the distributor of previous Resident Evil films, wanted to create a full CG film version of Biohazard. In 2006, Capcom joined, but the production process did not start until a year later, after director Makoto Kamiya, screenwriter Shotaro Suga and Digital Frontier joined the project. In late 2007, seven actors flew to Japan for the shoot. During the ten days stay in Tokyo, the crew benefited from two studios for body and facial capture, then used 50 PCs, total of 200CPUs to do the rendering for 1300 cuts. The Japanese singer and lyricist Anna Tsuchiya sang the ending theme for the film, titled "GUILTY".

While Leon acts sarcastic in Resident Evil 4, he behaves more coldly in the CGI movie; Mercier believes Capcom wanted to make a different take on Leon when developing the movie. Nevertheless, the actor expressed joy in the making of the movie. Leon’s new look for this era was achieved by photo scanning the face of model Jamisin Matthews.

== Release ==
Degeneration made its premiere in Japan on October 10, 2008, at the Tokyo Game Show. It received a limited theatrical release in Japan starting on October 17, 2008, in Shinjuku. The next day, the film opened in Nagoya and Osaka. It also had a limited theatrical release in the United States, opening on November 13 in New York City and November 18 in Los Angeles. A sneak-peek trailer of the first eight minutes of the film was also shown in the North American Home Theater of PlayStation Home.

Resident Evil: Degeneration was released on UMD, DVD, and Blu-ray formats in December 2008 (on December 26 in Japan and December 27 in North America). It was later released in the European Union in January–February 2009. More than 1.6 million home video copies were shipped as of September 2010.

The special features include the "Generation of Degeneration" featurette, character profiles, voice bloopers, a mock-up Leon interview, five trailers, two Resident Evil 5 trailers and previews. In the "Generation of Degeneration" special feature, the filmmakers explain that this film is in effect "Resident Evil 4.5", i.e. showing what happens after Resident Evil 4.

== Mobile game ==
Nokia and Capcom created a game loosely based on the film for the N-Gage mobile gaming service. This game was released on December 18, 2008, while the iPhone version was released on May 10, 2009. Despite being a main character in the film, Claire is not playable, with Leon being the sole protagonist and playable character in the game. The game takes place in the airport from the early scenes of the film and also contains enemies not seen in the actual film but seen in previous games, such as Cerberuses and the three Tyrants from Resident Evil, Resident Evil 2, and Resident Evil - Code: Veronica.

== Reception ==
=== Box office ===
Even though the film had only a limited 2-week / 3-screen theatrical release in Japan, box office sales surpassed ¥40 million, mobilizing 33,000 people.

=== Critical response ===
On Rotten Tomatoes, the film has an approval rating of 67% based on review from 6 critics.

Wired News criticized the "unrealistic animation, lame plot, and forced dialogue", noting that the film was "like a 90-minute-long videogame cut scene". Kim Newman of Empire magazine gave it 2 out of 5 and said fans might be pleased but newcomers won't care and should not start here. IGN also stated that the film "looks and feels like a 90-minute cut scene [...] which isn't to say that the movie is bad—it's not—just that it lacks a clear identity or voice. [...] It's worth watching, but probably not more than once." Matthew Reynolds from Den of Geek gave it 2 out of 5, and wrote "The gruesome Tyrant just about rescues this mild 90 minute cutscene from being entirely pointless" but concluded "it's tame action and absent plot will fail to please fans and outside spectators alike." Steve Barton of Dread Central gave it 2.5 out of 5. Comparing it to live-action Resident Evil films, he wrote that it was "sadly [...] not much better" than them. Charles Cassady Jr of Common Sense Media gave the film 2 out of 5 stars. Cassady said that due to the CGI animation "you're rarely engaged with the story in the rudimentary degree you might were these flesh-and-blood actors." Chris Plante of UGO.com gave it a grade B, and wrote: "It's violent. It's canonical. It's a Resident Evil game made into a film, both for better and for worse, but above all else, it's a gory good time."

=== Home media ===
Over 1.6 million DVD and Blu-ray units were sold worldwide. An estimated $11,232,337 were grossed from home media sales in the United States.

At the 35th Saturn Awards, the film was nominated for Best DVD Release. The Blu-ray version has received a high reputation in terms of functionality, such as receiving the "Best in Interactivity Award" at the 1st DEG Japan Awards hosted by Digital Entertainment Group Japan.

== Sequel ==
On September 14, 2010, Capcom and Sony Pictures Entertainment announced a sequel to the film titled Resident Evil: Damnation, released in 2012. The film features Leon S. Kennedy as its main character and was theatrically released in 3D in Japan.

== See also ==
- List of films based on video games
