= Resident Evil: Damnation =

- Japanese theatrical release poster

Japanese name
- Kanji: バイオハザード ダムネーション
Transcriptions
- Revised Hepburn: Baiohazādo Damunēshon
- Directed by: Makoto Kamiya
- Written by: Shōtarō Suga
- Based on: Resident Evil by Capcom
- Produced by: Hiroyuki Kobayashi
- Starring: Matthew Mercer; Dave Wittenberg; Wendee Lee; Courtenay Taylor
- Music by: Rei Kondoh; Shusaku Uchiyama
- Production company: Digital Frontier
- Distributed by: Sony Pictures Entertainment Japan
- Release date: October 27, 2012
- Running time: 100 minutes
- Country: Japan
- Languages: English; Japanese
- Box office: $2.3 million (Japan)

Resident Evil: Damnation, known as Biohazard: Damnation (Japanese: バイオハザード ダムネーション, Hepburn: Baiohazādo Damunēshon) in Japan, is a 2012 Japanese adult animated biopunk action horror film directed by Makoto Kamiya and produced by Hiroyuki Kobayashi. It features the voices of Matthew Mercer, Dave Wittenberg, Wendee Lee, and Courtenay Taylor.

The story revolves around DSO agent Leon S. Kennedy as he investigates biological weapons used in a European civil war. Kamiya aimed to tell a more original story by moving away from the narrative of the series, and asked for Capcom's aid in regards to the handling of the characters to make them consistent with their video game counterparts.

Damnation premiered on October 27, 2012, in Shinjuku, Tokyo. It was commercially successful, grossing more than $2 million in Japan and more than $3 million in home media format in the US.

== Plot ==
In 2011, DSO agent Leon S. Kennedy infiltrates the "Eastern Slav Republic", a former Soviet republic, to confirm rumors that Bio-Organic Weapons (BOWs) are being used in the country's civil war, and ignores the government's order to retreat. He comes across his contact, who has been attacked and is then killed by a strong BOW known as a Licker. After a brief skirmish, the Licker disappears, only to be replaced by a second. However, this Licker spares Leon, appearing to be controlled by a mysterious man. Leon is knocked out and awakens to find himself tied to a chair by rebel fighters; JD, the former teacher Alexander "Sasha" Kozachenko (better known as Buddy) and the elderly Ivan Judanovich, the group's Ataman.

Meanwhile, Eastern Slav Republic President Svetlana Belikova meets agent Ada Wong, who is posing as an agent of the Biohazard Security Assessment Alliance (BSAA). Ada explains a human infected with the “dominant” Las Plagas parasite will have a brief master-slave relationship with lesser BOWs infected with the Progenitor-virus (Lickers Beta themselves). Elsewhere, Leon tries to warn the soldiers of Ivan's infection, but Buddy starts a shoot-out. Leon escapes with the group, and Buddy mercy-kills Ivan after he succumbs to the Las Plagas parasite. Buddy meets up with JD, just as Plaga hosts (Ganados) attack them. JD and Leon escape to a church, where they regroup with other rebels.

Once inside the church, JD frees Leon. The rebel urges him to stop Buddy, who has become consumed by his hatred for the government after they bombed his school, killing Buddy’s fiancée and students in the process. Leon runs into Ada, who admits she is in the country to collect a sample of Las Plagas. She leaves and warns him the city will soon be bombed. Leon returns to the church, only to find it attacked by the infected, who killed the other rebels and infected JD. Buddy returns as JD transforms, and Leon is forced to kill JD. Leon then asks Buddy to give up Las Plagas, but he refuses and escapes when military jets bomb the church.

Having learned of Ada’s duplicity, Svetlana issues an international arrest warrant for the spy, and captures her after a hand-to-hand fight. Leon enters the bunker where Ada is held, and the two meet at the main hive control. When Svetlana and her troops surround them, Ada releases a smoke bomb and escapes while Leon kills several soldiers. Buddy arrives and summons Lickers to attack the troops. Svetlana retaliates by dispatching Tyrants to eliminate Leon, Buddy and the Lickers. After a long battle that takes them back to the surface, Buddy and Leon barely manage to defeat both Tyrants with a tank. Just as Svetlana prepares for her press conference, she is informed of a joint Russian and American invasion, which forces her to resign in her defeat and never to be seen again.

As Leon and Buddy watch the invasion, Buddy asks Leon to kill him before his Plaga takes control. Leon refuses, telling him to live to serve as the living memory of those who died and then shoots Buddy's spine, severing the Plaga's control over him. Afterwards, Leon speaks to Hunnigan about the mission, while elsewhere Ada speaks to her employer about a Las Plagas sample she retrieved. Ada does not make clear if she will hand it over or not, though she expresses appreciation for having her arrest warrant taken down.

A mid-credit scene shows Buddy, alive in a wheelchair, determinedly pushing it up a hill to a school as children around him hurry towards the school, showing he resumed his teaching career.

== Cast ==
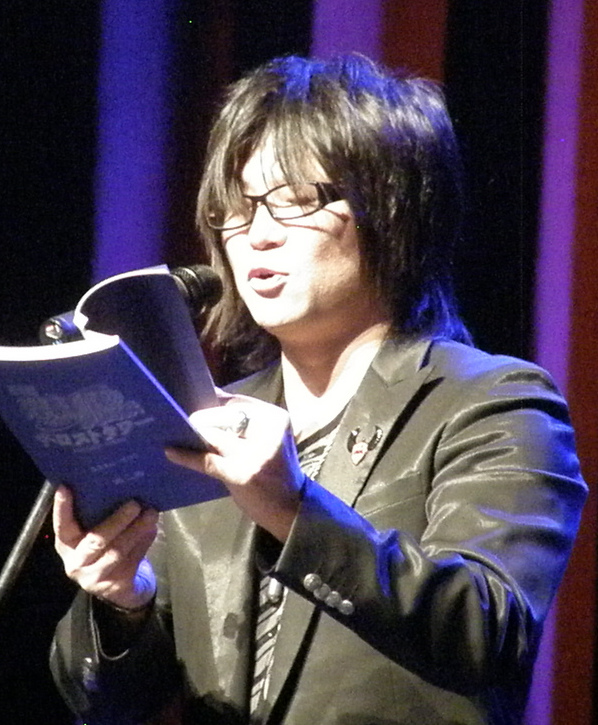
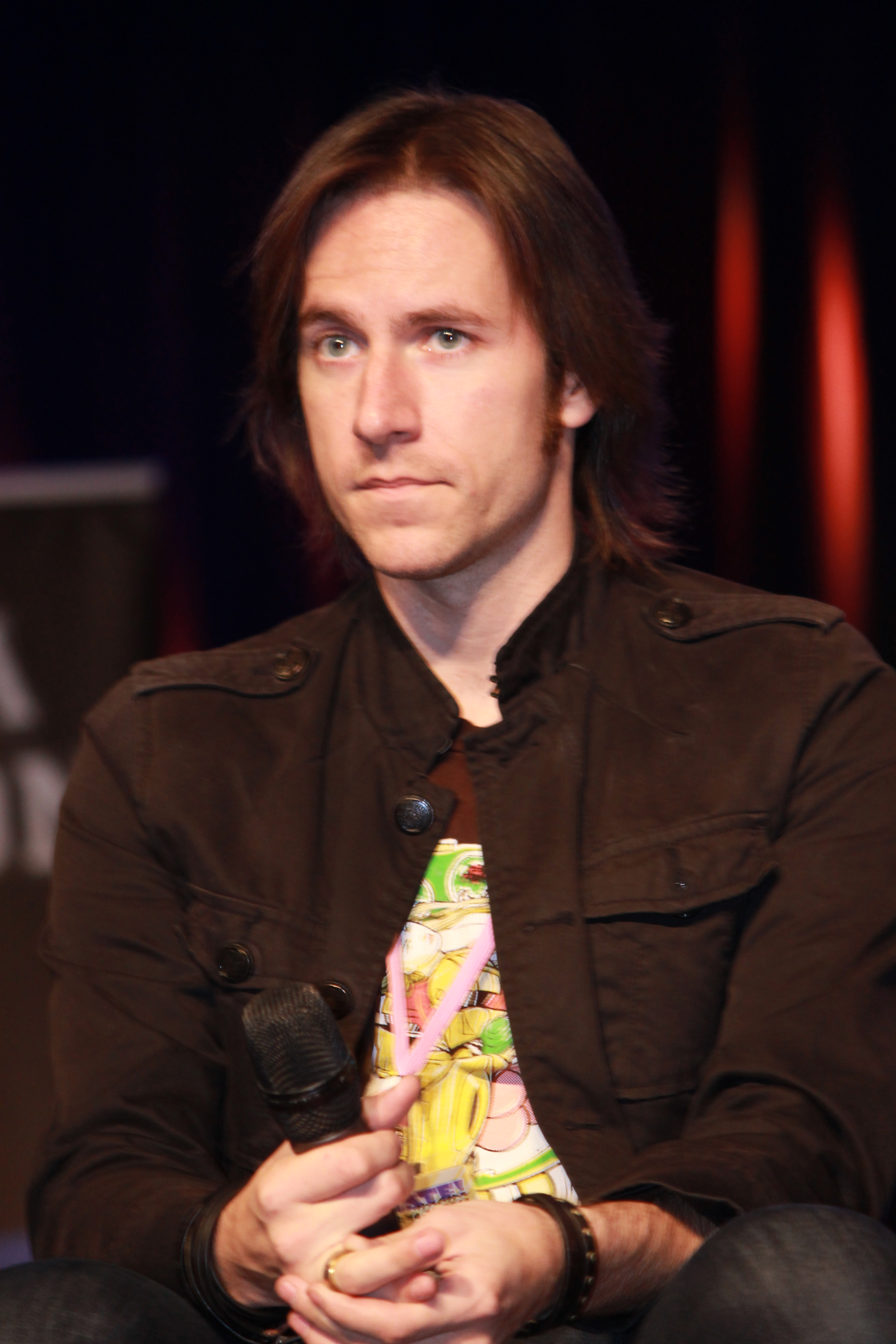
Toshiyuki Morikawa (left) and Matthew Mercer (right) voiced Leon Scott Kennedy in Japanese and English, respectively.

Voice actors and motion capture actors for the characters are listed below:

Character	English voice actor	Japanese voice actor
Leon S. Kennedy	Matthew Mercer	Toshiyuki Morikawa
Buddy / Alexander "Sasha" Kozachenko	Dave Wittenberg	Nobuyuki Hiyama
Ada Wong	Courtenay Taylor	Junko Minagawa
Svetlana Belikova	Wendee Lee	Eriko Kawasaki
JD	Val Tasso	Shintaro Ohata
Ataman / Ivan Judanovich	Robin Sachs	Shōzō Iizuka
Ingrid Hunnigan	Salli Saffioti	Yū Sugimoto

== Production ==
At the end of 2008, when Resident Evil: Degeneration was released, the producers talked about a possible sequel. As a result of Degeneration's commercial success, Capcom and SPEJ decided to co-operate again to produce the sequel. Production for the sequel officially began in September 2010. The director is Makoto Kamiya, who often spoke with producer Hiroyuki Kobayashi due to his experience with the Resident Evil video games. The character models were created based on Capcom's input in Resident Evil 6, which was released shortly before the film. Leon's recurring appearances in the games as well as in the previous film led to him being the film's protagonist. The team received the Licker's CGI model from Capcom. However, the team created original creatures in order to make Damnation a more unique film. In order to make the film faithful to the series, Kamiya often consulted Capcom over how should characters interact. He found the CGI animation challenging, and described the film as a standalone, but still recommended fans to play certain games and watch Degeneration to understand the film better. Kamiya initially wanted Damnation to follow the dysfunctional romance between Leon and Ada, but the idea was scrapped. He stated that the film is meant to foreshadow elements of Resident Evil 6.

The film was produced with motion capture and 3D. Kobayashi spoke of the team's desire to make the CGI films as appealing as Hollywood films. Kobayashi had produced Resident Evil 4 and wanted to make a sequel to it. For consistency, production again based Leon Kennedy’s character face design on Jamisin Matthews, the face model from Degeneration. To contrast Claire's role from Degeneration, Ada Wong was picked as the returning heroine. The film features buddy elements but with focus on how more mature Leon is depicted. While there is focus on action, Kobayashi also introduced more horror elements. The inclusion of the Tyrants is meant to give the audience a shock due to how menacing they are. Another change compared to the previous film is the fact that the story is not set in North America but rather in post-Soviet Eastern Europe.

Writer Shotaro Suga returned from writing Degeneration. He further elaborated on the romance between Leon and Ada, which was briefly explored in Resident Evil 2 and Resident Evil 4, and since they never met in Resident Evil 5, there might have been a time when Leon and Ada met again. For the film, Suga went to Eastern Europe and created the Eastern Slav Republic, a fictional post-Soviet country formed following the dissolution of the Soviet Union. The ending is meant to be a cliffhanger as the story is meant to continue in Resident Evil 6. In retrospect, Suga claims that Damnation surpassed Degeneration. The theme song by Anna Tsuchiya, "Carry On", is played during the credits.

Toshiyuki Morikawa returned to voice Leon in Japanese, while Matthew Mercer provided the English dub for Leon. The latter had previously done the motion capture for Resident Evil 6 too but was replaced for the film by Kevin Dorman. Mercer elaborates the Leon from Damnation is a more "younger, cockier" character, and "actually follows his transition" in contrast to the "broken, downtrodden Leon that Resident Evil 6 begins with". Damnation was recorded over five days according to Mercer, which lasted longer than the video game. Mercer said the script was "pretty stringent, but we [the staff] were able to improvise a bit". He claimed that since some of Leon's enemies are silent, there was not a lot of opportunity to perform jokes. Courtenay Taylor, who plays Ada Wong, said that she felt pressure when voicing her character since it was her major debut as Operation Raccoon City was not popular, unlike Damnation and Resident Evil 6, and had more knowledge about the live-action films. Val Tasso said that JD was his most memorable work and said that he also did the motion capture unlike other actors, also saying he enjoyed his character for the multiple facets the script gave him, most notably when interacting with Leon despite their initial antagonism.

=== Release ===
The first trailer and first seven minutes of the film debuted in the panel discussion at San Diego Comic-Con on July 13, 2012. The film was released theatrically in Shinjuku, Aichi, and Osaka on October 27, 2012.

Capcom and Sony Pictures released Damnation as a digital download on Xbox Live, Zune and PlayStation Network on September 15, 2012, and on DVD and Blu-ray on September 25, 2012. The Damnation bonus contents include an art gallery of conceptual sketches, a 7-minute short film about the creatures seen in the film, a 30-minute documentary about the making of the film, a 6-minute gag reel, and video game and film trailers (such as Resident Evil 6, DmC: Devil May Cry and Dragon's Dogma).

== Reception ==
The film grossed $2,325,035 at the Japanese box office, with its debut week earning $666,837. In the United States, Resident Evil: Damnation has earned $3.3 million in home video sales. In Japan, the DVD sold 24,952 units while the Blu-ray sold 23,917 units.

On review aggregator Rotten Tomatoes, 100% of 5 reviews are positive for the film, and the average rating is 8/10. IGN gave the film a score of 7.8 out of 10, named it "the best Resident Evil film to-date" but stated that there was a lack of accessibility for newcomers. Joel Harley from Starburst rated the film 7/10, and criticized the lack of introduction to the characters for viewers who are new to the series, though felt that fans of the franchise would enjoy the installment, the CGI of which allowed for compelling action sequences. Otaku USA found the premise confusing and noted that the relationship Leon has with Ada comes across underdeveloped while the horror elements are removed in the climax.

Various characters were stated to have "heavy Eastern Bloc accents" by DVD Talk, but "the crispness and clarity of the center channel will not leave [the viewer] scratching [their] head as to what was said." IGN said that the audio of the Blu-ray version was well presented along with the soundtrack. The Hollywood News commented that the animation was one of the major outstanding parts of the film for giving the enemy creatures horror-like looks.

In a retrospective article, Escapist Magazine wrote that Damnation was the best film in the entire franchise, citing a narrative similar to Resident Evil 4, and lauded the film for its accessibility, visuals, and action sequences. Looper gave Degeneration, Damnation and Vendetta the title of "Honorable Mention" when listing all Resident Evil movies as a result of the live-actions having generally been reviewed more than the CGI ones.

The film was awarded the 2013 International 3D Society Japan Award for animation.

== Sequel ==
The film was followed by Resident Evil: Vendetta, which was released in 2017.

== See also ==
- List of films based on video games
