= Makoto Kamiya =

Japanese film director (born 1965)

- 神谷 誠
- Born: October 6, 1965 (age 60); Tokyo, Japan
- Occupations: Film director, special effects director, visual effects supervisor
- Years active: 1988–present
- Known for: Godzilla, Mothra and King Ghidorah: Giant Monsters All-Out Attack (2001); Resident Evil: Degeneration (2008); Resident Evil: Damnation (2012)

Makoto Kamiya (神谷 誠, Kamiya Makoto; born October 6, 1965) is a Japanese director and visual effects supervisor. His notable film directing credits include Resident Evil: Degeneration (2008) and Resident Evil: Damnation (2012). Kamiya has also contributed to many other tokusatsu and visual effects-heavy productions throughout his career, directing the special effects for films such as Godzilla, Mothra and King Ghidorah: Giant Monsters All-Out Attack (2001), and Sinking of Japan (2006), as well as the Gantz (2011–2016) and Kingdom (2019–present) film series.

== Life and career ==
Kamiya was born on October 6, 1965, in Tokyo, Japan. As a child, he lived near Toho Studios and would often sneak into the studio grounds to peek into the warehouses where the miniature sets and monster costumes were stored, sparking his early fascination with tokusatsu filmmaking.

Kamiya began his career in the special effects industry in 1988, working as an assistant special effects director under Kōichi Kawakita on the film Another Way (1988). He was introduced to Kawakita's group by a senior from his vocational school. The senior had boasted that Kamiya greatly respected Kawakita, but when Kamiya—unaware of the claim—denied it directly in front of Kawakita, he was still hired, though Kawakita jokingly called him a fraud. During his time with the group, Kamiya often assisted across various departments, including special effects, puppetry, art direction, and even wire operations for close-up shots of Godzilla or handling crane weights. He humorously referred to himself as a "fake assistant director" because his role was so hands-on and varied rather than strictly administrative.

He served as an assistant special effects director on multiple entries in the Heisei Godzilla series, beginning with Godzilla vs. Biollante (1989), followed by Godzilla vs. King Ghidorah (1991), Godzilla vs. Mothra (1992), and others. He also contributed to the tokusatsu television series Gridman the Hyper Agent (1993–1994, working on about eight episodes, uncredited) and joined the production of Godzilla vs. Mechagodzilla II (1993) midway through filming while working on Gridman; as a result, he received no credit for the latter film. Additionally, he worked as assistant special effects director under Shinji Higuchi for the entire Heisei Gamera trilogy: Gamera: Guardian of the Universe (1995), Gamera 2: Attack of Legion (1996), and Gamera 3: Revenge of Iris (1999).

In 2000, Kamiya made his debut as a full special effects director with the disaster film Whiteout, starring Yuji Oda. The following year, in 2001, he took on the major role as special effects director for a Godzilla film with Godzilla, Mothra and King Ghidorah: Giant Monsters All-Out Attack, directed by Shusuke Kaneko. Kaneko, a martial arts enthusiast, praised Kamiya’s deep knowledge, which was evident in the dynamic fight choreography of the monsters. Suit actor Mizuho Yoshida, who portrayed Godzilla in the film, noted that Kamiya would personally demonstrate Godzilla's movements during direction, which he found amusing and once joked that they should simply film Kamiya himself as the monster.

He has maintained a long and close professional relationship with director Shinsuke Sato, serving as special effects director or visual effects supervisor on many of Sato's films. Their collaboration began with the two-part live-action adaptation Gantz (2010) and Gantz: Perfect Answer (2011). Kamiya later worked on Sato's I Am a Hero (2015/2016), where his visual effects and special effects work—particularly the grotesque zombie designs and intense action sequences—received significant praise and contributed to the film winning the Best Visual Effects award at the VFX-Japan Awards. He also served as VFX supervisor on Sato's Library Wars series, Bleach (2018), Inuyashiki (2018), the Netflix series Alice in Borderland (2020–), and multiple entries in the Kingdom live-action film series, where he helped realize large-scale battle scenes with massive armies and epic VFX.

In 2007, Kamiya made his feature film directorial debut with the anthology film Shin-Onna Tachiguishi Retsuden (2007). He followed this with the fully CG-animated Resident Evil: Degeneration (2008) and its sequel Resident Evil: Damnation (2012). In 2019, he served as both the main director and special effects director for the tokusatsu television series Ultraman Taiga.

He has also directed the special effects for films such as Cutie Honey (2004) and Sinking of Japan (2006), and appeared in Returner (2002), Godzilla Against Mechagodzilla (2002), Killers (2003), Otakus in Love (2004), and The Next Generation: Patlabor (TV 2014).
