= Dragon's Dogma =

2012 video game

- Developer: Capcom (Note: Ported to Windows by QLOC)
- Publisher: Capcom
- Directors: Hideaki Itsuno; Kento Kinoshita (Note: Dark Arisen only)
- Producers: Hiroyuki Kobayashi; Minae Matsukawa
- Designer: Yoichiro Ikeda
- Programmer: Yoshiharu Nakao
- Artist: Daigo Ikeno
- Writers: Bingo Morihashi; Haruo Murata; Makoto Ikehara
- Composers: Inon Zur; Tadayoshi Makino; Rei Kondoh; Masayoshi Ishi
- Engine: MT Framework
- Platforms: PlayStation 3; Xbox 360; Windows; PlayStation 4; Xbox One; Nintendo Switch
- Release: May 22, 2012: PlayStation 3, Xbox 360; NA: May 22, 2012; JP: May 24, 2012; AU: May 24, 2012; EU: May 25, 2012 Dark Arisen PlayStation 3, Xbox 360; NA: April 23, 2013; JP: April 25, 2013; EU: April 26, 2013 Windows; WW: January 15, 2016; JP: October 5, 2017 PlayStation 4, Xbox One; WW: October 3, 2017; JP: October 5, 2017 Nintendo Switch; WW: April 23, 2019; JP: April 25, 2019
- Genres: Action role-playing, hack and slash
- Mode: Single-player

Dragon's Dogma (Note: Japanese: ドラゴンズドグマ, Hepburn: Doragonzu Doguma) is a 2012 action role-playing game developed and published by Capcom. First released for PlayStation 3 and Xbox 360, an enhanced version subtitled Dark Arisen was later released for the same consoles in 2013, with ports being released for Windows, PlayStation 4, Xbox One, and Nintendo Switch in the ensuing years. Set in Gransys, a high fantasy world inspired by Sicily, the player takes on the role of a human protagonist dubbed the Arisen on a quest to defeat the dragon Grigori, a being said to herald the world's end, while uncovering a deeper conspiracy along the way.

The gameplay focuses on the Arisen—a customizable avatar—exploring Gransys completing quests and fighting monsters in real-time combat. The protagonist is accompanied by Pawns, characters who provide combat support and advice; the protagonist has one customized Pawn, and two additional Pawns either pre-set within the game or other customized Pawns shared by other players through an online lobby. Both standard combat and boss battles involve grappling with or climbing on enemies.

Dragon's Dogma was conceptualized by director Hideaki Itsuno in 2000. The project was successfully pitched and production began in 2008. The 150-strong staff, who had previously worked on Capcom franchises such as Street Fighter, Breath of Fire, and Devil May Cry, took inspiration from Devil May Cry. The music, led by Tadayoshi Makino and including contributions from Israeli-American composer Inon Zur, used a full orchestra and focused on ambiance. Dark Arisen was designed to incorporate fan feedback and offer a complete experience for both old and new players.

Dragon's Dogma received generally positive reviews from critics, who praised its gameplay, but generally criticized the narrative for being lacking. The original game and Dark Arisen had sold 9.4 million units by December 2025. A Japan-exclusive MMORPG, Dragon's Dogma Online, was released in 2015. An animated series was released on Netflix in 2020. A sequel, Dragon's Dogma 2, was released in 2024.

== Gameplay ==
The player-created protagonist explores the open world environment of Gransys with their Pawn companions.

Dragon's Dogma is an action role-playing game set in an open world environment and played from a third-person perspective. The player can select between various vocations: Fighter, Strider, Mage, Warrior, Ranger, Sorcerer, Mystic Knight, Assassin and Magic Archer. Gender choice and appearance settings are also available. The vocation, or class system, changes gameplay and tactical options available to the player. For example, the Fighter has abilities that focus on hack and slash combat and the Strider is skilled at climbing large enemies. The game was designed to be playable even by those who are not skilled at action games.

One of the game's main innovations is the "pawn" system. While the player's party is exploring the world, the three party members who accompany the main character are controlled by artificial intelligence, but the player can issue orders to them, including "go", "help" and "come". One of the party members is a non-playable character (NPC) and belongs to the main character's world, while the other two party members are NPCs borrowed from other players by connecting online or are locally generated by the game. The party members, referred to as pawns, can talk, seek the main character's help, and provide information about enemies. The player must work on strengthening the main character and the party members. The pawns are vocal, yelling out useful hints and strategies, which are often vitally important to surviving tough boss encounters and dungeons. The pawn system also features social networking features.

The game features a "grab" action, where the main character can grab or cling to enemies, objects, or NPCs. The player can use this feature for more advanced attacks. For example, the main character can either grab onto a griffin's legs and attack it directly, or climb up to reach its head for a more lethal blow. "In a lot of action games, with big enemies the tendency is just to have you hacking away at the shins. You don't get the full effect of fighting a giant boss," Hideaki Itsuno, the director of Dragon's Dogma, said. "With this game, you can climb all over it. If it has a body part, you can attack it."

The game's large open world environments have drawn comparisons to The Elder Scrolls IV: Oblivion. In addition to the large open world, Dragon's Dogma features a large city environment with over 200 non-player characters (NPCs) who move about according to their schedules. The player can communicate with the residents in full voice. The game also features a persistent world with a dynamic weather system and day-night cycle.

The game's hack and slash combat elements have been compared to their own Devil May Cry series and Dark Souls. Some of the fantasy elements are reminiscent of Breath of Fire, and the combat and party systems have been compared to Monster Hunter.

=== Multiplayer ===
Although Dragon's Dogma does not feature a direct multiplayer mode, the developers have revealed that players can compete online with asynchronous encounters called Events via Xbox Live or the PlayStation Network. One such event includes the 'Ur-Dragon' in which the effect of each party's attacks will be combined until the Ur-Dragon finally falls. Players that deal the fatal blow will receive the maximum reward, but all players can still obtain both common and rare items dropped by the Ur-Dragon when they inflict damage.

== Plot ==
The game opens with a group led by a knight named Savan nearing the end of a quest to defeat the Dragon, a being that signals the end of days. An unknown time later in the present-day Duchy of Gransys, the protagonist's village of Cassardis is attacked by the newly-arrived Dragon. When the protagonist attacks the Dragon, the Dragon takes their heart. The protagonist remains alive after this, marking them as the "Arisen", a figure destined to face the Dragon and stop the coming apocalypse; the Arisen is served by Pawns, human-like beings who live to fight the Dragon, and the Arisen creates a new Pawn shortly after beginning their quest. Heading to a nearby encampment, the protagonist defends an encampment of soldiers from a Hydra attack, taking one of its heads before driving it back; this is witnessed by Mercedes Marten, a soldier sent from a neighboring nation to support Gransys's Duke Edmun Dragonsbane against the Dragon.

Mercedes helps the Arisen escort the Hydra head to the Duke's capital of Gran Soren; upon completing quests for the local Wyrm Hunter guild, the Arisen is granted an audience with the Duke, who has held the position for over a century without aging after claiming victory against the Dragon. During their quest, the Arisen finds aid from a former Arisen dubbed the Dragonforged; investigates an underground tower dubbed the Everfall by the local Pawn guild; confronts Salvation, a nihilistic cult led by a man named Elysion that seeks the Dragon's victory; and learns of Mercedes's role as a token ally as other nations have come to fear Gransys becoming too powerful should the Duke defeat a second Dragon. The Arisen eventually confronts Elysion, who turns his followers into undead to kill the Arisen. The Arisen defeats them, but the Dragon arrives and kills Elysion. The Dragon challenges the Arisen to find him and stop the apocalypse. Confronting the Dragon, the Dragon offers the Arisen a choice; fight and kill it, or sacrifice their beloved—a character the Arisen has grown close to during the game—in exchange for replacing the Duke as ruler of Gransys, the same bargain the Duke took when he faced the Dragon.

Upon defeating the Dragon, the Arisen and all those connected to the Dragon—including the Duke and the Dragonforged—lose their immortality, and the Everfall becomes a bottomless pit that swallows part of Gran Soren. Returning to Gran Soren, the Arisen is attacked by the aged Duke and flees upon being accused of cursing him. While fleeing, the Arisen and their Pawns are swallowed by the Everfall. Passing into a higher plane after opening a portal within the Everfall, the Arisen faces the Seneschal, the being which sustains the world and the current form of the knight Savan. The Arisen is offered a choice: fight the Seneschal or return to Gransys and live a quiet life. Should the Arisen lose the fight with the Seneschal, they are reborn as the next Dragon. Besting the Seneschal results in the Arisen taking their place, unable to interact with the world below. The Arisen then kills themselves to break the cycle, falling back towards Gransys with their Pawn. The game ends with the Pawn awakening within the Arisen's body in their village to be met by their beloved.

== Development ==
The concept for Dragon's Dogma was created by Hideaki Itsuno. He created the initial concepts of an RPG title and the Pawn system in 2000 before he was brought on board the staff of Devil May Cry 2. Itsuno had a chance to pitch the project in 2008 following the completion of Devil May Cry 4. With internal discussions going on about Capcom's next large-scale project, the company had asked for a concept that could potentially sell one million copies. Dragon's Dogma was one of seven pitches given by Itsuno. The main concept was an RPG based primarily on single-player but with casual multiplayer elements similar to watching a bulletin board system. The Pawn system and its Western RPG-styled formed part of the pitch. Itsuno's decision to pitch the project was due to the advances in gaming hardware, which had become powerful enough to properly realize the game.

At the time Dragon's Dogma was pitched, social mobile games with features similar to the Pawn system had yet to take off in Japan, and it was before the popularity of hardcore action RPGs such as Demon's Souls and Dark Souls. It was also the first time an open world had been proposed for a Capcom title. Due to these factors, there was initial resistance and scepticism from Capcom executives. Capcom eventually approved the project after Itsuno scaled down his initial proposal to fit within the projected budget and development resources. Development of the game lasted three years including early concept development, with the 150-strong staff being mostly carried over from Devil May Cry 4. Including external staff, the development team was over 200 people. As with other large-scale Capcom projects, the development team was divided into units with specific tasks, allowing production to be streamlined without compromising the project as a whole.

=== Scenario and art design ===
The scenario and script were written by Haruo Murata. Brought on board the project during development, he was favorably impressed by an early demo of a Cyclops battle. He was in charge of writing the main scenario and dialogue interactions, with his main aim being to create a setting that would react to playing actions in a "natural" way. The globe is inspired by Sicily with its Mediterranean appearance and Greco-Roman and Western medieval cultural traits. The world design and basic scenario were created by Makoto Ikehara, a veteran of the Breath of Fire series. He was not involved in the later parts of production, but he was able to bring knowledge of both fantasy settings and role-playing mechanics to the team. Another contributor to the scenario was Bingo Morihashi, who had previously worked on the scripts on the Devil May Cry series since Devil May Cry 2 and BlazBlue: Calamity Trigger. Itsuno cited multiple inspirations for the world of Dragon's Dogma, including The Lord of the Rings, Dungeons & Dragons and The Neverending Story. To research the setting, the team made several trips to Europe to research its scenery and architecture. The game's title evoked both the Dragon's key role and how the Dragon taught the protagonist—and by extension the player—about the world.

The art directors were Daigo Ikeno and Makoto Tanaka. Ikeno was an established Capcom artist noted for his work on the Street Fighter series, Devil May Cry 3 and the first two Onimusha titles. Ikeno designed the Dragon himself, aiming for a classic high fantasy look and "cool" aesthetic. The final design emulated the "simple yet powerful" dragons of folklore, but with the main aim being to make the fantastical creature as realistic as possible. The characters were designed by Toru Kanaseki; monster designs were handled by Yoshinori Matsushita and Yumei Nagaki; weapon and armor designs were created by Kaoru Araki and Tomihiko Osumi; and background and concept art was designed by Kenichi Suzuki and Western artist Craig Mullins. During the initial design phases, several concepts were created but had to be discarded due to either design changes or a lack of development time and resources to include them. Tanaka described the world as "an orthodox sort of high fantasy open world" similar to those used in Hollywood movies so players would immediately understand it.

The characters' clothing was inspired by the clothing used in Medieval society. The clothing designs of Cassardis and Gran Soren were designed to contrast each other; the people of Cassardis had a lot of exposed skin and a blue color theme, while those in Gran Soren covered up more and used orange. While much of the final game used Medieval clothing designs, many of Kanaseki's early designs drew from Ancient Greek and Roman designs. As the key color of the game was red, Kanaseki designed the default Arisen character designs to look good with flaming red hair. He also gave the Arisen a simple hairstyle. Mercedes was designed to appear capable of defending herself while maintaining her femininity. The monastic design of Elysion was designed to both serve as the model for Salvation cultist clothing and remain modest so as not to overshadow the character himself. The Duke was designed to show his growing mental strain, and his cloak—which incorporated dragon designs symbolizing his reputation—took a long time to complete. The monsters were created based on their representations in folklore and fairytales. Rather than making the original designs more fantastical, they were made more realistic. The art team tried not to stray too far from traditional imagery grounded in ancient legends and iconography; this approach was influenced by Mike Mignola's Hellboy comics and the manga Berserk by Kentaro Miura.

=== Design ===
The aim for the developers was, rather than using Japanese role-playing traditions, to emulate Western RPGs including Fallout 3, The Elder Scrolls IV: Oblivion and Fable II. Itsuno's original version of the game was substantially larger than the final game, including the whole of Gransys, a dungeon related to the game's lore, and the game world's moon. While utilising RPG elements, Dragon's Dogma was primarily focused on action gameplay as Capcom's staff were experienced with action games. Itsune described the game as their attempt to create a defining RPG experience similar to The Elder Scrolls V: Skyrim. The control layout was carried over from Capcom's other action titles such as Devil May Cry. Many of the action elements were carried over and how characters fought with enemies was also drawn from that series. The game's open world was the largest ever created for a Capcom title.

The world's design was intended to promote both realism and fantasy; game designer Makoto Tanaka compared the wished-for atmosphere to someone walking through the African savana and encountering its wildlife, but with fantasy beasts replacing real-world animals. The team gradually worked through the rules of the game world, which were all based on the real world as far as possible. According to Kobayashi, the game's scale and style—which were like nothing produced by Capcom up to that point—caused multiple problems for the development team. There were several times when Kobayashi felt like giving up due to the problems that came up. Due to the world's scale, the development team had to get used to multiple new sound management techniques, creating a new audio program to manage sound over in-game distances. A difficult sound to create was bell chimes, which were included due to their importance to Medieval European life when sounding for events. The sounds were recorded using a real bell at a Hollywood studio. Recording the bell chimes was troublesome, as the structure the bells were suspended in nearly collapsed. To help create monster noises, the sound team used the sounds of trained animals from Hollywood which were trained for roles in production.

The game used the 2.x version of Capcom's proprietary MT Framework game engine, which had previously been used in several Capcom games including Lost Planet: Extreme Condition and Devil May Cry 4. According to the programmer Taro Yahagi, who was in charge of work for the engine, Dragon's Dogma was the most difficult project as MT Framework required a large number of adjustments. Previous MT Framework titles had been stage-based action titles, so transitioning to an open world was a drastic change and required the creation of a dedicated "World Offset" function which shifted the world based on player position so environmental data could be updated. The team could not increase the number of data points to solve the issue of rendering environments as this would have been beyond the available hardware. Another new addition was "deferred lighting", an advanced lighting engine that could maintain realistic lighting during the game's day-night cycle in the open world, in addition to environmental effects such as characters getting wet. The retail version of the game also incorporated an advanced anti-aliasing filter. Character actions, including combat actions such as grappling, where created using a combination of motion capture and inverse kinematics. Physics was controlled using a newly created in-house physics engine. The physical interaction between large monsters and characters climbing on them using a combination of physics and motion-based algorithms similar to early water animation techniques. These designs were intended to work on the contrasting hardware of the PS3 and 360.

The game was developed for the PlayStation 3 (PS3) and Xbox 360 (360) consoles. The choice of PS3 and 360 was chosen due to both the team's experience with the platforms and their large international install base. According to producer Hiroyuki Kobayashi, the team's previous experience creating Devil May Cry 4 helped with development as they both carried over technology and had familiarity with the planned platforms. The online functionality for the PS3 and 360 were respectively co-developed and supported by Sony Computer Entertainment and the Japanese branch of Microsoft. Their cooperation enabled Capcom to reduce running costs for the online functions to nearly nothing. The limited scope of online elements was a compromise which both fulfilled with gameplay goals of the team while avoiding many of the problems of full multiplayer.

=== Localization ===
The localization was led by Erin Ellis. When creating the dialogue, Ellis's team wanted to create a similar feeling to the writing of George R. R. Martin and J. R. R. Tolkien due to the dramatic style of the game's narrative. The team decided to use semi-archaic English words in dialogue such as "thou" and "aught", resulting in the team needing to keep themselves from going too far or adding in incongruous words that clashed with the archaic style. Rather than using conventional spell names such as "Fire" and "Ice", the team found old English words such as "Halidom" and "Ingle". In contrast to many Japanese games—which were translated from Japanese to English and then into other languages—Dragon's Dogma was localized in six languages at once due to the development team still working on the game during the localization process. This meant that the team was able to minimize trimming the dialogue down and eliminating improbably abbreviations. According to Makino, the team hired 82 voice actors; the recording took place in North America between two studios over fifteen weeks, with two audio directors supervising the process. The team used different accents to indicate people being from different regions of the world, promoting a sense of realism. The Pawn voices were difficult due to the variety of physical customization. The team ultimately chose twelve voice actors to record lines at different pitches. The game ultimately featured 20 hours of voiced dialogue, coming to 42,000 lines of dialogue for all characters. As English was the primary language for all versions, lip syncing was not an issue. Needing to handle the different pieces of the localization within the strict time limit was a new experience for both Ellis and the Capcom staff.

=== Music ===
The music director for Dragon's Dogma was Tadayoshi Makino, who had previously worked on Monster Hunter Tri. Makino initially began planning the musical elements of the game in 2009, when the game world's design was still in a state of flux. Makino was initially pulled in two different directions by Itsuno and Kobayashi; while both wanted to make an impression outside standard fantasy music expectations, Itsuno wanted to use jazz while Kobayashi wanted to use hard rock similar to Queen and Kiss. By contrast, Makino wanted to use a full orchestra and ethnic elements, which resulted in the score having far more variety than anyone expected. Makino's team created samples, matched them against prototype promotional videos, and then consulted sound staff at Capcom to blend the ethnic, orchestral, and rock elements. The first completed track, the game's main theme, was favorably received by Kobayashi and Makino used the fusion of elements for the entire score. When creating his plan for the music, Makino decided to move away from the typical harsh-sounding action soundtracks Capcom games were known for, which used many high and low-pitched notes. Instead, Makino chose a softer sound for Dragon's Dogma. His aim was to not make the music too assertive, allowing it to blend in with the natural world of the game.

Makino brought on three other composers to work on the soundtrack. They were Rei Kondoh, a composer who had worked on Ōkami and the Sengoku Basara; Inon Zur, an Israeli-American composer noted for his work on the Dragon Age series who was brought on board to make the soundtrack an international collaboration; and Masayoshi Ishi, whose work included the Sengoku Basara series and The Excitement of Haruhi Suzumiya. Ishi was involved from an early stage, when the musical direction of the project was still being decided upon. Kondoh was brought in due to his work on previous Capcom titles. Zur's methods of working were entirely new to the otherwise-Japanese composers, something which the team thought would benefit the production. Makino acted as general supervisor due to his knowledge of the game's story. During the composing stage, Kondoh and Zur were described by Makino as bouncing opinions off each other when creating the soundtrack when creating tracks for individual situations. The composition went smoothly for the team, with each member stimulating the other. Vocals for the main theme "Eternal Return" were provided by Aubrey Ashburn, a frequent collaborator with Zur. Ashburn was brought on board after the theme was written and recorded using a substitute vocal track. During recording, she had instructions via a livestream from the production team.

The music was recorded in Bulgaria by the Sofia Philharmonic Orchestra; the recording, which took place at the Bulgarian National Radio Studio, included roughly 130 musicians and choir. A European orchestra was chosen as Makino wanted a distinctive sound different from the typical Hollywood-styled orchestral sound. The recording was supervised by Thomas Böcker and his company Merregnon Studios, who were brought aboard the project by Harmonics International based on their previous collaborations on Symphonic Fantasies concerts. Rock elements included in some tracks were recorded in Japan by guitarist Tenyu Nakamura and drummer Tatsuya Suzuki. As much music as possible was recorded live rather than using synthesized instruments. The game's theme song was "Into Free -Dangan-", written and performed by Japanese rock duo B'z. The song was an English cover version of B'z's 1998 single "Samayoeru Aoi Dangan". The lyrics were written by Koshi Inaba and Shane Gaalaas, while the music was created by Tak Matsumoto.

For Dark Arisen, Makino returned to compose new tracks for the game's new dungeon alongside Kondoh and Zur; the new work, mainly focused on the new dungeon, covered 24 tracks. In contrast to Dragon's Dogma, the added music for Dark Arisen made heavy use of synthesized music. Despite moving away from the style of the main game, Makino wanted to ensure the new music remained thematically in tune with the rest of the soundtrack. The new vocal theme for Dark Arisen, "Coils of Light", was composed by Makino and performed by Japanese singer Raychell. When first contacted about the project, Raychell was already familiar with Dragon's Dogma and daunted by the prospect of providing a new theme song. The lyrics were written by Raychell to convey the game's world, in addition to the dark atmosphere of the new dungeon. Makino created "Coils of Light" using the core melody of "Eternal Return", tying into the original soundtrack. The English version of "Coils of Light" was sung by William Montgomery.

The official soundtrack album for Dragon's Dogma was released on May 23, 2012. Featuring 66 tracks across two CDs, the album was published by the music label of Square Enix. A shorter album was released by Sumthing Else Music Works as a physical and digital release on November 11. "Into Free -Dangan-" was released as a digital single on iTunes on April 4, 2012. The two-CD album for Dark Arisen was released on April 24, 2013. The first disc contained the new music, while the second included a selection from the main soundtrack and tracks that could not be released on the original album. The Japanese version of "Coils of Light" was not included on the album. At Kobayashi's suggestion, Makino collaborated with Square Enix's Tsuyoshi Sekito, who had composed music for multiple Square Enix titles and performed as part of The Black Mages; Sekito performed guitar for some of the album's arranged tracks. "Coils of Light" was released as part of Raychell's album L ▶ R on April 24. A compilation album titled Dragom's Dogma 5th Anniversary Best, featuring tracks from across the Dragon's Dogma series up to that point, was released on December 20, 2017, through Capcom's music label.

== Release ==
The public reveal of Dragon's Dogma was planned for the 2010 Tokyo Game Show alongside DmC: Devil May Cry, but the visual quality of the title at the time was thought lacking so the announcement was delayed. The game was eventually revealed in April 2011 at a special event by Capcom. Initially scheduled for "early 2012", Capcom delayed the release date by several months. A game demo was released on April 24, 2012, in Japan and North America, and on April 25 in Europe. The demo offered access to the character creation system and two classes to use in two boss encounters from the main game. Characters created in the demo could be imported into the full game. Dragon's Dogma was released on May 22 in North America, May 24 in Japan and Australia, and May 25 in Europe. All versions came with a one-time download code to access a demo of Resident Evil 6. Following the game's release, multiple downloadable content (DLC) packs were released, ranging from cosmetic items to new quests.

=== Dragon's Dogma: Dark Arisen ===
An expanded version of the game titled Dragon's Dogma: Dark Arisen (Note: ドラゴンズドグマ：ダークアリズン, Doragonzu Doguma: Dāku Arizun) began development in 2012 for the game's original platforms. The game includes additional content such as an extra dungeon dubbed Bitterblack Isle, with additional weapons and armor exclusive to that area, and full Japanese voice acting. Producer Minae Matsukawa and director Kento Kinoshita had both worked on the original Dragon's Dogma. Kobayashi acted as executive producer. Dark Arisen was Kinoshita's debut as a director. The game came about due to community feedback about the original game, with Bitterblack Isle being designed as a lore-based end-game dungeon with powerful enemies. There was also a wish to create a "complete" version of the game. Dark Arisen was released in Japan on April 25, 2013, as both standard and limited editions. In Western territories, the game was released on April 23 in North America and Australia, and on April 26 in Europe. Save data from Dragon's Dogma can be transferred into Dark Arisen.

A Windows version of Dark Arisen was planned from an early stage, with the main aim being to take advantage of the Windows platform's greater technical specifications compared to the PS3 and 360, in addition to expanding the game's player base. The port was developed with QLOC. The team's main aim was to optimize the game for the Windows platform, rather than improve or expand on current assets. The Windows version of Dark Arisen was released worldwide on January 15, 2016. It was eventually released in Japan on October 5, 2017. Dark Arisen was later released for PlayStation 4 and Xbox One on October 3 in the West and October 5 in Japan. Dark Arisen was later released for the Nintendo Switch on April 23, 2019, in Europe and North America, and April 25, 2019, in Japan.

== Reception ==
=== Original version ===
Reception

Aggregate score
Aggregator	Score
Metacritic	PS3: 78/100; X360: 75/100

Review scores
Publication	Score
Eurogamer	8/10
Famitsu	34/40
G4	4/5
Game Informer	8.5/10
GameRevolution	4.5/5
GamesMaster	84%
GameSpot	8/10
GamesTM	8/10
GameTrailers	8.7/10
IGN	7.5/10
PlayStation Official Magazine – Australia	8/10
PlayStation Official Magazine – UK	8/10
Official Xbox Magazine (UK)	8/10
Play	4.8/10
PlayStation: The Official Magazine	8.5/10
RPGamer	4/5
The Guardian	4/5
Digital Spy	4/5
The Telegraph	4/5

In Japan, Dragon's Dogma received positive reviews from critics, where Famitsu gave the game an overall score of 34 out of 40, based on four reviewer scores of 8, 9, 8, and 9. Famitsu gave it a "Hall of Fame: Gold" award, praising "the game's variety in combat, the effectiveness of working together with Pawns, the exceptionally fun sidequests, and the uniqueness of each vocation." In the Western world, Dragon's Dogma received "generally favorable" reviews from critics, according to review aggregator website Metacritic.

Game Informer gave the game an 8.5 out of 10 and stated that "I left the game feeling that I made my mark on Gransys the way I chose to, instead of being escorted from plot point to plot point. When you're talking about an open-world game, I can't think of higher praise." Eurogamer Italy said that "Dragon's Dogma is a great fantasy game, where the lack of a multiplayer experience is compensated from an impressive single player." UK magazine PSM3 wrote, "Big, challenging and imaginative, but its hardcore nature won't appeal to everyone." GameSpot gave the game a score of 8 out of 10. The review praised the "fantastic combat encounters," one of "the best boss fights in any role-playing game," atmospheric touches, and "striking choices" that lead to "an unforgettable ending." The review notes that the game "takes chances, and it's that riskiness that makes this role-playing game so unique among its peers," concluding that, "Engrossing and frustrating, Dragon's Dogma is a flawed and unique gem." The review also notes that while the boss battles are "epic", in the sense they allow players to climb up enemy monsters, the game itself lacks an adequate fast-travel system.

Play UK criticized it for low framerates on the Xbox 360 version. IGN scored it 7.5/10, stating "Dragon's Dogma has the scale and challenge of a great action RPG, but not the character or polish. Nevertheless, there's a lot to love here, like some great ideas that make you want to give it a chance." The Gaming mafia user Evan Daggett calls the game "a true underrated gem" and demands a sequel of the game. GameTrailers praised the challenging combat and the gameplay mechanics, though they criticized the story as "flat". Their rating for the game was an 8.7.

In a review of Dragon's Dogma in Black Gate, Josh Bycer said "Dragon's Dogma is one of those games that you will either love or hate. While it's not refined, this is clearly an example of a diamond in the rough."

=== Dark Arisen ===
Reception

Aggregate score
Aggregator	Score
Metacritic	PS3: 80/100; X360: 77/100; PC: 81/100; PS4: 78/100; XONE: 80/100; NS: 78/100

Review scores
Publication	Score
Eurogamer	9/10
Game Informer	8.5/10
GameTrailers	8.8/10
IGN	PS3/X360: 7.9/10; PC: 8.9/10
PlayStation Official Magazine – Australia	9/10
Official Xbox Magazine (UK)	8/10
PC Gamer (US)	81%
Forbes	9/10

Dragon's Dogma: Dark Arisen received "generally favorable" reviews from critics, according to review aggregator website Metacritic.

IGN scored the PC version 8.9/10, calling it a "thoroughly great action RPG" and stating "it has near perfect fluidity and all the epic feel of the Xbox 360/PS3 edition" and is a "valid alternative to The Witcher 3 or Dark Souls, if one can withstand graphics that are not really on par with today's standards."

Dragon's Dogma: Dark Arisen received a nomination for "Role-Playing/Massively Multiplayer Game of the Year" at the 17th Annual D.I.C.E. Awards.

In April 2020, IGN listed Dragon's Dogma: Dark Arisen as one of the best modern role-playing games, placing at number 9. IGN Staff cited, "It may be built off the massive open world RPG foundation of games like The Elder Scrolls and The Witcher, but there's still nothing quite like Dragon's Dogma: Dark Arisen."

=== Sales ===
Upon its debut in Japan, the PS3 version of Dragon's Dogma topped gaming charts with sales of over 302,000 units. The 360 version came in at fourth place with over 29,000 units sold. These strong sales broke the previous record holder for the fastest-selling new intellectual property of the seventh console generation. In the United States, the game sold 92,000 units within five days. The game reached ninth place in the regions's retail charts for May. In the United Kingdom, the game debuted in third place in game charts behind Max Payne 3 and ahead of Dirt: Showdown. By the following month, the game had sold 1.05 million units worldwide, being considered a major success by Capcom. According to the report, sales in Japan "exceeded expectations", while the game struggled in Western markets. Alongside sales of Resident Evil 6, the game was credited by Capcom for their record-breaking earnings during 2012.

Dark Arisen for PS3 debuted in Japan at second place in gaming charts with sales of over 125,300 units. The 360 version reached thirteenth place with over 9,000 units sold. In the United Kingdom, Dark Arisen debuted in third place behind Dead Island: Riptide and Injustice: Gods Among Us. In July 2013, Capcom described sales of the Dark Arisen version had met with solid sales without outselling the original version from the previous year. The PC version, while suffering from lower sales due to less marketing, became both Capcom's fastest-selling and one of the three best-selling titles for PC in the company's history. As of March 31, 2026, sales of the Nintendo Switch version of Dark Arisen have reached 1.30 million units.

As of March 31, 2026, Dragon's Dogma (including Dark Arisen) had sold 9.5 million units.

== Legacy ==
=== Dragon's Dogma Quest ===
An online free-to-play 2D RPG spin-off titled, Dragon's Dogma Quest (Note: ドラゴンズドグマ クエスト, Doragonzu Doguma Kuesuto) was released for PlayStation Vita and iOS. The story occurs in the Kingdom of Latania in a parallel universe from Dragon's Dogma. Players control a newly appointed Arisen on a journey to slay the dragon. The game uses turn-based combat with up to eight Pawns in a single party with each player controlling four Pawns. The game introduces new vocations such as Rogue, Elemental Tutorial, Poison Enchanter, Symapthizer, Reversal Master, and Gatherer. However, the enemy climbing feature from Dragon's Dogma was not retained.

The majority of the development team from the original game returned for Dragon's Dogma Quest with Masanori Komine as director and Hideaki Itsuno as executive director. Development began shortly after the completion of the first game with them having little experience with making online games. Dragon's Dogma Quest was initially announced to be in development for the PlayStation Vita on June 6, 2013. An iOS version was announced on July 11 of that same year and released two days later. The PlayStation Vita version was released on December 19 of the same year. Capcom ceased distribution on October 14, 2014 for iOS and on January 30, 2015 for PlayStation Vita.

=== Dragon's Dogma Online ===
A free-to-play spin-off game, Dragon's Dogma Online, was released in Japan for PlayStation 3, PlayStation 4, and Windows on August 31, 2015. It reached over two million downloads within two weeks, but was shut down in December 2019.

=== Netflix series ===
In March 2019, production of an original net animation anime series adaptation based on the game was announced by Netflix. The series was released on September 17, 2020.

=== Sequel ===
Director Hideaki Itsuno had expressed interest in making a direct sequel as early as 2013. The sequel, Dragon's Dogma II, was announced in June 2022 for PlayStation 5, Windows, and Xbox Series X/S. The game was developed in the RE Engine, with Itsuno returning as director. The debut trailer was shown during a PlayStation Showcase in May 2023. It was released on March 22, 2024.
