= Dino Crisis 3 =

2003 video game

- North American box art
- Developer: Capcom Production Studio 4
- Publisher: Capcom
- Directors: Tetsuro Oyama; Hiroyuki Maruhama
- Producer: Hiroyuki Kobayashi
- Artist: Futoshi Nagata
- Writers: Noboru Sugimura; Hiromichi Nakamoto; Shin Yoshida; Hiroaki Kanazawa
- Composer: Shinichiro Sato
- Series: Dino Crisis
- Platform: Xbox
- Release: JP: June 26, 2003; NA: September 16, 2003; EU: November 7, 2003
- Genre: Action-adventure
- Mode: Single-player

Dino Crisis 3 (Note: Japanese: ディノクライシス3, Hepburn: Dino Kuraishisu Surī) is a 2003 action-adventure game developed by Capcom Production Studio 4 and published by Capcom for the Xbox. Like the previous installments in the Dino Crisis series, the gameplay revolves around fighting dinosaurs or other reptiles, but the enemies in this entry are not real dinosaurs. They are mutations created from DNA extracted from various dinosaur species. The game takes place on a space station. It is the third and final game in the Dino Crisis series.

The game was originally planned for both Xbox and PlayStation 2, but the latter version was scrapped early in development.

== Gameplay ==
The player can use 2 guns with 6 ammo types (one gun and 3 ammo types per playable character), in addition to small machines called "WASPS" that help against dinosaur encounters. The game is played mostly through the character Patrick and only a small section is played as Sonya. There are three types of body armor available.

== Plot ==
Set in the year 2548, it has been 300 years since Earth lost contact with the colony ship Ozymandias, en route to a^{2}. Somehow, the ship has reappeared near Jupiter. A team called S.O.A.R. (Special Operations And Reconnaissance) is sent aboard the probe ship Seyfert to investigate. As the Seyfert sends out a shuttle to investigate the ship, its weapons suddenly activate. A beam destroys the Seyfert and then the shuttle, killing nearly everyone except for Patrick Tyler, Sonya Hart, Commander Jacob Ranshaw, and McCoy. Patrick and Sonya reunite on the exterior of the ship and gain access. The ship's interior is derelict, although there is still power.

McCoy boards as well but is killed by a large Tyrannosaurus-like creature which chases the team. The T. rex is then attacked, mauled and killed by a swarm of eel-like mutants, one of which is ripped in half and thrown to the floor beforehand. After fighting his way through the ship's storage areas, Patrick meets a survivor, a girl named Caren Velázquez. After meeting her, she runs away in fear.

Patrick spots Caren once again, looking at a picture frame of her father, Dr. Miguel Velázquez. Patrick learns she has been on her own for 300 years. Sonya discovers that MTHR - the ship's control system - is creating the dinosaur-like creatures from the DNA of animals in storage as a replacement for the human crew. When Patrick tells them that he is shutting MTHR down for good, Caren opens the door and runs away.

As Caren and the team hurry out of the experimental laboratory, they are attacked by a mutant Ankylosaurus known as a Regulus. Caren is struck in the abdomen and sent flying into the wall by the beast, and later fatally wounded. Jacob sacrifices himself to kill the mutant by setting off his grenades at the creature's mouth. At this point, it is revealed that Caren is an android.

Later, the same beast reappears, revealing that Jacob's sacrifice is for naught. With no choice, Patrick has to put the Regulus to rest.

Caren manages to repair the ship, saving Patrick from succumbing to the broken environmental systems. Patrick returns to the Energy Core to restart it, but the room is severely damaged when a mutant Spinosaurus crashes through the wall, filling the area with water coolant.

After fighting off the creature, the team runs to the MTHR sector as the core begins to go into meltdown. As they arrive at the sector, the MTHR and Engine Sectors detach from the Front Deck, Shaft and Energy Sector, which are destroyed by the meltdown. The Engines soon activate an emergency system and Warp Jump to Earth.

Patrick meets MTHR and questions her. He then tries to stop MTHR's main computer but she opens another hatch releasing the Spinosaurus the second time. Upon defeating the creature, Patrick tries to stop MTHR sending the dinosaurs to Earth and fights her, eventually destroying her system, which has disastrous effects on the ship, causing it to activate the self-destruct sequence. MTHR's last words are "I just wanted to complete my mission".

Patrick is reunited with Sonya and Caren as they try to escape the ship via an escape shuttle, but they are attacked by the "Cebalrai", a two-headed Giganotosaurus. The beast jumps onto the platform and chases the trio down to the bottom of the platform. As Patrick runs, the Cebalrai slams its left head into him and tosses him into the wall, making him unable to reach his gun. Caren lures the creature toward her. Patrick tries to stop her, but a stomp of the Cebalrai's paw causes the platform Caren and the monster are standing on to collapse. Both Caren and the Cebalrai fall into the abyss - much to Patrick's dismay. After defeating another T. rex, Patrick and Sonya are able to escape before the ship self-destructs, but the Cebalrai, being able to survive in a vacuum, was able to get on the top of the shuttle. Patrick gets on top of the shuttle himself to destroy the "genetic freak" in a final battle.

Midway through the battle, the Cebalrai grows a third head, and Patrick is forced to use a "Final Wasp", which weakens the creature and sends it flying into space.

== Characters ==
- Patrick Tyler (Michael Yurchak) - A member of S.O.A.R., Patrick Tyler's strong sense of duty and natural charisma make him an asset to any operation. Trusted by the entire team, he boosts troop morale.
- Sonya Hart (Vanessa Marshall) - Another member of S.O.A.R., Sonya's cool and flawless actions make her appealing. Her single goal is completing missions.
- McCoy (Wally Wingert) - Not much is known of him. Patrick and Sonya find him running towards them, asking about the other team member's whereabouts. After he realizes he has been drooled on, an Australis pulls McCoy into the air and throws him into the wall, killing him. His last words, "What is this?", are heard before the beast creeps up on him.
- Cmndr. Jacob Ranshaw (Kevin Killebrew) - Jacob Ranshaw leads S.O.A.R.; His directness and bold decision-making abilities are critical to the operation. He is a fanatic about the safety of his troops. He is inevitably killed by Regulus, after its fight with Patrick. Jacob sacrifices himself, using a grenade to kill Regulus, though it fails.
- Caren (Karen) Velázquez - (Shanelle Workman) - Apparently the sole survivor of the mysterious dinosaur outbreak. She also worked as a patrol officer in one of the ship's control hangars. Caren's appearance is shrouded in mystery throughout the game. She is first found by Patrick and is later discovered to be an android, with several other copies made by the M.T.H.R. 248. During a battle against the Cebalrai, she sacrifices herself to save Patrick, by making it fall on a loose platform.
- Captain Satoko Evans (Jasmin Paul) - The Captain of the Ozymandias. After the Ozymandias is affected with cosmic rays, the crew members began to die. During her last days she and the surviving crew members searched for animal DNA, and mixed it with their own. This was all by the captain's orders to M.T.H.R. 248, who then conducted a cloning process.
- M.T.H.R. 248: The main antagonist of the game. This M.T.H.R. (voiced by Jasmin Paul) unit is a first generation model used on space vessels. She is also the ship's main computer system on board the Ozymandias. 300 years have passed since meeting a human being and she has gone mad. She considers the dinosaur-like creatures to be her 'children', due to the fact that she created them. Her last words were: "I just wanted to complete my mission".

== Development ==
Dino Crisis 3 entered production in mid-2000, in a production led by Hiroyuki Kobayashi, with Shinji Mikami as Executive Producer. The original proposal was for a "human drama" set mostly within an unspecified "facility" in a city under siege from rampaging time-displaced dinosaurs, with the player being able to fight the dinosaurs with AI partners, and in which decisions made by the player could change the course of the story. In reaction to the September 11 attacks in the United States, Capcom Production Studio 4 moved away from the city environment, and it was instead decided the game would be set on board a space ship far into the future. Dino Crisis 3 was always intended as an Xbox-exclusive title when that console was judged to be better at rendering graphics than the PlayStation 2; Hiroyuki Kobayashi considered a PlayStation 2 port of the game to be "impossible" to make.

The game's HUD went through considerable development in 2002. Originally the HUD was to be positioned on the bottom-left corner of the screen, and show health and jetpack fuel stats as lines, as well as the number of WASPs available to the player. The weapons system itself was different from earlier games; players would rely on a main weapon with infinite ammunition, with the option to switch to other forms of ammunition for stronger opponents which would be limited and have to be found or bought. The WASPs were designed as a secondary weapon which would fly around the map and provide additional aid to the player during combat. Like in Dino Crisis 2, more focus is given to giving players the fun of shooting dinosaurs than item conservation and avoiding them like in Dino Crisis. A shop feature was created for the game where, like in Dino Crisis 2 the player could purchase supplies based on points accumulated from killing dinosaurs. However, in this game the player could accumulate a finite number, requiring them to return to the shop frequently or they would receive no further points. In developing the camera, the team decided to take full advantage of the Xbox's power and make it 3D rather than using 2D pre-rendered backgrounds like Dino Crisis 2 had done. In a similar manner to Studio 1's contemporaneous Resident Evil Outbreak, rooms were divided into zones where a camera would follow the player, then cut to another camera when they leave the area.

The storyboard editor, Shinji Higuchi, made the decision that the main environment, the Ozymandias, would be capable of transforming, being a long-time fan of mecha. Such ideas for the setting came from science fiction films, with the Jupiter orbit setting coming from the film, Sayonara Jupiter!, which Higuchi served on as a production assistant. Several designs for the ship were also made ahead of the Xbox Conference Summer 2002 and, according to producer Hiroyuki Kobayashi, a competition was held within the development team to pick the design to use for the game. Due to this fascination with mecha, 3CGI paid particular attention to making the cutscenes of Ozymandias' transformation seem more realistic, with moving parts being locked in place. The characters were also designed based on Japanese science-fiction tropes, and attention was made to the SOAR team uniforms. For example, a transformation sequence of Patrick's helmet was carefully drawn to show how it could be stored within his suit. Distinct from the space suits of the other cast members, Caren's mini-dress was designed to echo Japanese "race queen" idols, and Shinji Mikami had her purple tights removed to better match that concept. 3DCGI also made sure to put focus in her animations, so that her breast and dress movements would appear more realistic in cutscenes. The creatures that populate the Ozymandias are revealed in the story to be genetically-engineered human-dinosaur hybrids. As such the creature designers were free to create the creatures how they wanted; this was liberating for the designers, as the Dino Crisis and Dino Crisis 2 teams had problems with making the Therapods unique. A common theme in the dinosaurs was that they would have exposed skin and could release electricity as a form of attack.

An early story proposal centred on the emergence of dinosaurs in the present day world, possibly the very time distortion Dino Crisis 2 alluded to with the Noah's Ark Plan. A single image hinting to this storyline was shown by Yoshiki Okamoto when he announced three Capcom games at the May 16 Xbox announcement for E3 2001. Kobayashi moved the project away from the city proposal and to something else. With offers from the Flagship team, led by Noboru Sugimura, Hiromichi Nakamoto, Shin Yoshida and Hiroaki Kanazawa, it was agreed the game story be shifted to a futuristic environment in space which would allow for new ideas. Some fifty minutes of pre-rendered cutscenes were created for the game. Makoto Kamiya, a professional film director, was hired to direct the work so that elements such as camera angles would look movie-like.

== Reception ==
Reception

Aggregate score
Aggregator	Score
Metacritic	51/100

Review scores
Publication	Score
Edge	3/10
Electronic Gaming Monthly	6.33/10
Eurogamer	3/10
Game Informer	6.25/10
GamePro	2.5/5
GameRevolution	D+
GameSpot	5.4/10
GameSpy	2/5
GameZone	6.9/10
IGN	6/10
Official Xbox Magazine (US)	6.5/10

Dino Crisis 3 received "mixed" reviews, according to review aggregator website Metacritic. IGN gave the game a 6.0, describing it as a missed-opportunity to advance the series, having been betrayed by minor, but repetitive faults. GameSpot branded the game with a "Mediocre" 5.4, having found the game more "frustrating than [...] fun" due to its flaws, though finding the game to be enjoyable if ignored.

The most common criticism was the camera system, which was named by IGN as "The Worst Camera Ever". The problem was due to the high speeds that the player can frequently travel at. As with the first two Dino Crisis titles and the early elements of the Resident Evil series, rooms in Dino Crisis 3 are separated into separate, invisible zones where the camera is set to change once the boundary is crossed. Because of the fast-moving jetpack, players would travel between those boundaries rapidly, with multiple camera changes leading to confusion as to where the player is supposed to be going, resulting in them inadvertently turning back. Because of the large size of zones and the long-range auto-aim system, IGN expected that players would spend 80% of their game to be firing at enemies that are out of their view and dodging attacks from off-screen. GameSpot suggested that the game would be a lot more playable had the player been given the opportunity to, at the very least, move the angle of the camera. GamePro was also frustrated by the camera stylization, saying that the "awkward" camera stopped the game from reaching the potential it could have had.

There was some disappointment regarding the variety of the enemies: IGN counted only three non-boss enemies present in the game, but admired their unique designs, particularly for the "simian-esque" dinosaurs. There was more support for the boss enemies, though, with IGN citing the key to victory being to avoid attacks rather than to simply shoot. GamePro was disappointed by the enemies' entry into battles, with them literally appearing out of thin air.

IGN was supportive of Capcom's decision to turn the Ozymandias into a giant puzzle, with the ship being able to routinely change formation. This puzzle method was compared to a jigsaw. IGN also admired the uniqueness of the 50+ rooms within the Ozymandias, but questioned the decision to avoid such environments as a cafeteria or a mess hall, which would have made the ship feel more like it actually had a crew to begin with. GameSpot saw little 'uniqueness' in the designs, noting the same shiny metallic look of the ship's interiors being everywhere and, without using the 3D map feature, it would be hard to get lost when moving around (partly because of the camera system). The 3D map, itself, while helpful to some, was also considered to be an "arduous process" to use.

The voice acting was thought to be of reasonable quality, which IGN felt to be 'surprising' for a Japanese game using English-speaking actors. IGN did mention the presence of "corny" dialogue, though. GameSpot considered it to be a "passable" B-grade, in comparison. Other aspects of the sound design, such as the score and sound effects, were also found to be good or "passable"; they were criticised for being limited and repetitive in rooms, however.

GameTrailers included the game in a "Top Ten Worst Sequels" feature, stating that "[i]t's a good sign you have an abysmal sequel when its developer respectfully declines to follow it up".
