= Dino Crisis =

Game series published by Capcom

- Genres: Survival horror, action-adventure, light gun shooter
- Developer: Capcom
- Publisher: Capcom
- Creator: Shinji Mikami
- Platforms: PlayStation, Dreamcast, Microsoft Windows, PlayStation 2, Mobile, Xbox,
- First release: Dino Crisis; July 1, 1999
- Latest release: Dino Crisis Bundle; January 29, 2025

Dino Crisis (Note: Japanese: ディノクライシス, Hepburn: Dino Kuraishisu) is a survival horror and action-adventure video game series created by Shinji Mikami and developed and published by Capcom. The plot focuses on recurring outbreaks of deadly dinosaurs in closed environments, such as a laboratory on an island. The series also includes comic books and merchandise. As of September 30, 2026, the game series has sold 5.1 million units worldwide.

== Games ==
Release timeline
1999	Dino Crisis
2000	Dino Crisis 2
2001
2002	Dino Stalker
2003	Dino Crisis 3
2004
2005
2006
2007
2008
2009
2010
2011
2012
2013
2014
2015
2016
2017
2018
2019
2020
2021
2022
2023
2024
2025	Dino Crisis Bundle

Aggregate review scores
Game	Metacritic
Dino Crisis	(PS) 84/100 (Note: GameRankings score) (DC) 74/100 (PC) 59/100
Dino Crisis 2	(PS) 86/100 (PC) 57/100
Dino Stalker	(PS2) 50/100
Dino Crisis 3	(Xbox) 51/100

=== Dino Crisis (1999) ===
Dino Crisis takes place in the year 2009 on a fictional location known as Ibis Island. The Secret Operation Raid Team (SORT) has sent an agent, Tom, to investigate a research facility. During the recon mission, he learns that Dr. Edward Kirk, a world-renowned scientist who was reported dead three years ago, is leading a secret weapons project within the facility. SORT sends four agents (Regina, Gail, Rick, and Cooper) to acquire Kirk and return him to custody. The team arrives on the island under the cover of darkness, dropping in via parachute. Cooper is blown off course and lands in the jungle away from the others. Lost in the dark, he is chased down by a Tyrannosaurus and eaten. The other three agents, unaware of his death, proceed with the mission.

=== Dino Crisis 2 (2000) ===
After the events of the previous game, unsafe research into time-distorting Third Energy has resulted in an entire research base, military institution, and fictional metropolis of Edward City to be transported to another time; along with all of its inhabitants. Secret Operations Raid Team operative Regina returns as one of the main playable characters, sent along as an adviser to the rescue team that travels through time to find survivors of the time displacement and recover data on the Third Energy experiments. Dylan Morton, the rescue team leader, is the second playable character. Despite Dylan and Regina initially going their separate ways, they end up joining forces to find a way back to the present. The player switches between controlling Regina and Dylan at specific points during the story.

=== Dino Stalker (2002) ===
Dino Stalker is a light gun shooter and the third installment in the Gun Survivor series by Capcom and contains characters from Dino Crisis 2. The Gun Survivor series is a spin-off series to the main Resident Evil series, however, Dino Stalker is the only game in the series with ties to Dino Crisis instead.

=== Dino Crisis: Dungeon in Chaos (2003) ===
Dino Crisis: Dungeon in Chaos is a first-person shooter mobile game published by the now-defunct Mobile Capcom in 2003.

=== Dino Crisis 3 (2003) ===
Set in the year 2548, it has been 300 years since Earth lost contact with the colony ship Ozymandias, en route to a². Somehow, the ship has reappeared near Jupiter. A team called S.O.A.R. (Special Operations And Reconnaissance) is sent aboard the probe ship Seyfert to investigate.

=== Dino Crisis Bundle (2025) ===
Dino Crisis Bundle is a compilation of Dino Crisis and Dino Crisis 2 that was released on Windows on January 29, 2025.

=== Future ===
For several years fans have been asking for a new installment in the Dino Crisis series. In 2014, there was circulating news that Capcom had begun development on Dino Crisis 4 with the intention of announcing the sequel at the Tokyo Game Show of that year. Tao Weishi, the producer of Monster Hunter Online, was interested in working with Capcom on a revival of the Dino Crisis series. Bocanegra stated: "It would certainly be nice to get a Dino Crisis revival. And Capcom could potentially start by remastering the original game, which would fall in line nicely with their current strategy when it comes to remasters". Shinji Mikami has also stated that he has long held ideas for a new game in the series.

In March 2017, Capcom's Masachika Kawata said he was not aware of any internal plans to revive the series despite it being a good prospect for remasters or remakes. In December, the official Twitter account for Capcom's lead development team responded to a fan asking if a new Dino Crisis title would release soon, to which they replied: "If a lot of people wish".

Both the original Dino Crisis and Dino Crisis 2 were made available to purchase on GOG.com on January 29, 2025, as part of GOG's ongoing Preservation Program. On February 12, 2026, Dino Crisis and Dino Crisis 2 were made available to purchase on Steam.

== Legacy ==
A six-part manhua based on Dino Crisis (恐龍危機) was published in Hong Kong. It is a loose adaptation of the first Dino Crisis game, and was published by the Hong Kong–based company Jade Dynasty (玉皇朝). The series was produced by Tony Wong (黄玉郎).

Regina has also appeared in the tactical role-playing video game Namco × Capcom, beginning on a cruise ship from Gun Survivor 4 (Resident Evil: Dead Aim), and as a card in SNK vs. Capcom: Card Fighters' Clash. In Resident Evil 3: Nemesis, the player can unlock her outfit with a red wig as a bonus costume for Jill Valentine. Annie also "cosplays" as Regina in Super Ultra Dead Rising 3 Arcade Remix Hyper Edition EX Plus Alpha, a downloadable content for Dead Rising 3. A figure of her was released by Yujin in the Namco × Capcom series.

== See also ==
- Exoprimal
