= Cutter (professional wrestling) =

Wrestling move

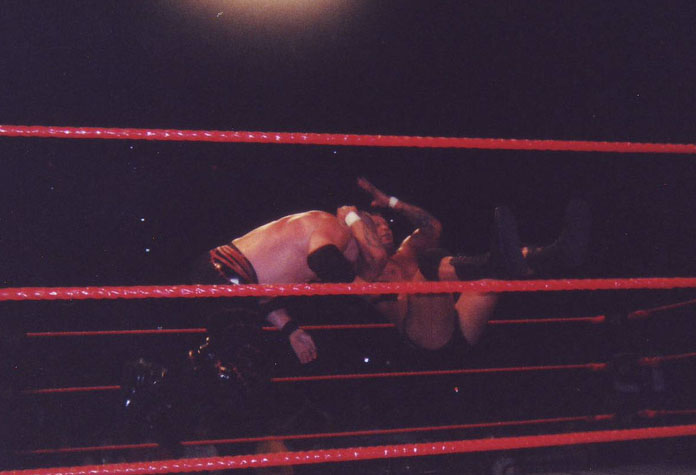
Randy Orton performing the RKO (jumping cutter) on Kane

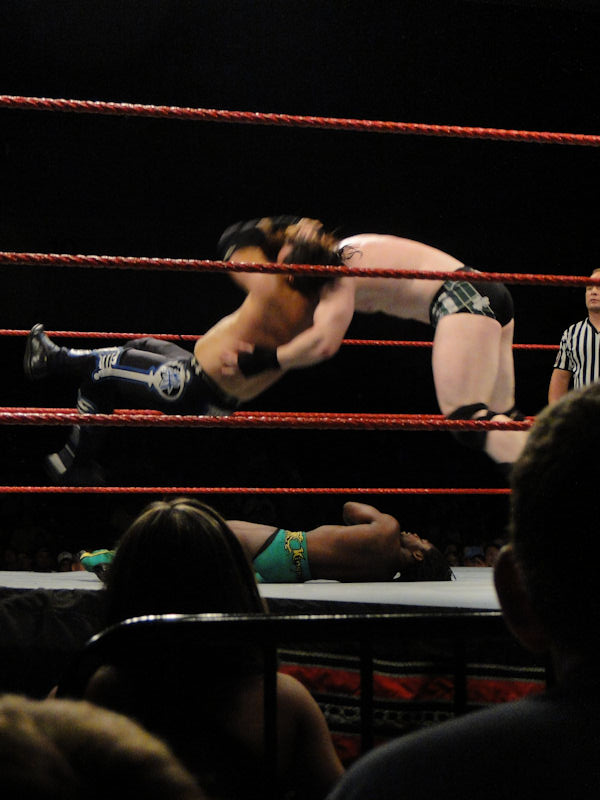
Matt Hardy performing a Twist of Fate on Sheamus

In professional wrestling, a cutter is a 3/4 facelock neckbreaker maneuver. This move sees an attacking wrestler first apply a 3/4 facelock (reaching back and grabbing the head of an opponent, thus pulling the opponent's jaw above the wrestler's shoulder) before falling backwards (sometimes after running forwards first) to force the opponent face-first to the mat below.

The cutter was innovated by Johnny Ace, who called it the Ace Crusher. It was later popularized by Diamond Dallas Page, who called it the Diamond Cutter, which is where the move got its name. The most famous of all the cutters is the RKO, the finishing move of Randy Orton. The cutter also formed the base for the later development of another professional wrestling move known as the stunner.

== Variations ==
=== Argentine cutter ===
The attacking wrestler gets the opponent in the Argentine backbreaker position as to execute the Argentine Backbreaker drop. The attacking wrestler then pushes the opponent's legs so that they flip horizontally 180 degrees. As the opponent's weight is being shifted to one side, the attacking wrestler applies the 3/4 facelock and drops the opponent.

=== Backpack cutter ===
Also known as a Piggyback cutter, in this elevated cutter variation, the opponent is first raised up in a piggy-back position with whichever arm holding the opponent's head with a 3/4 facelock. From here, the attacking wrestler pushes one the opponent's legs backwards with enough strength to force them into a (near) horizontal position and drops down back first while still holding the opponent's head to force them to fall into the cutter.

After their match, Diamond Dallas Page used this version as a counter against Billy Kidman as he was trying to immobilize Page with a sleeper hold while his feet were suspended off the mat (as Page was the taller of the two) in an August 16th, 1999, episode of Nitro.

=== Back suplex cutter ===
This variation sees the wrestler lift an opponent from behind as with a belly to back suplex. Then, instead of falling backwards, the wrestler pushes the opponent's legs so that the opponent turns over in mid-air, so that they are now face-down and parallel to the ground. As the opponent falls, the wrestler reaches back and seizes the opponent's head in order to perform the cutter.

=== Crucifix cutter ===
In this version, the wrestler first lifts the opponent up in a crucifix hold before rotating them into the cutter. Another variation involves the opponent lifted in a reverse crucifix and dropped into the cutter. This particular version was innovated and popularized in America by Tommy Dreamer, who called it the TommyHawk.

=== Diving cutter ===
In this version, a wrestler dives from the top rope and nails a cutter to a standing opponent from the front. There is also a springboard version in which the wrestler dives from the ropes in a backflip position and delivers a cutter to the standing opponent. Chris Bey uses this move, calling it The Art of Finesse.

=== Elevated cutter ===
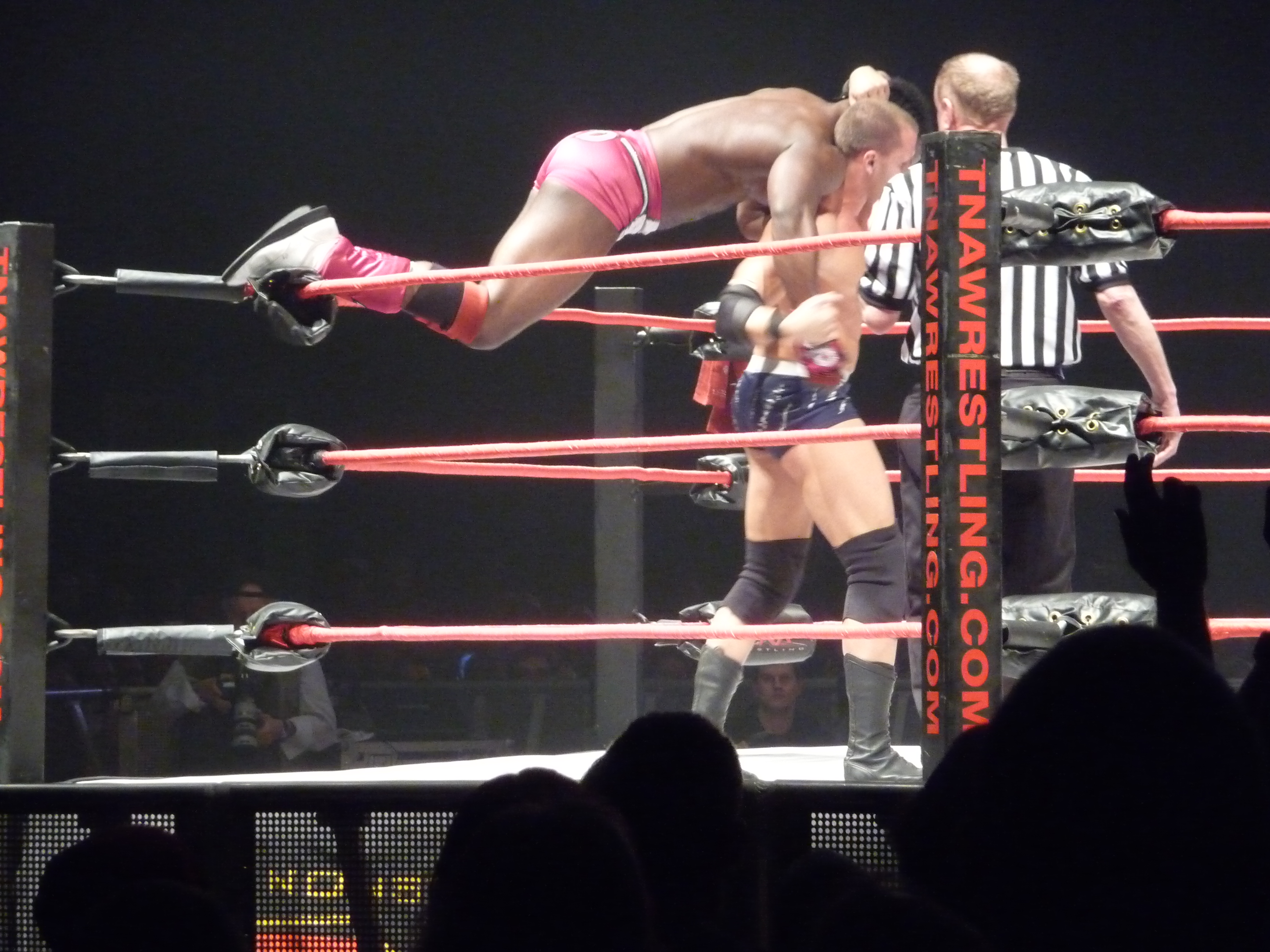
Nigel McGuinness performing the Tower of London (Elevated cutter) on D'Angelo Dinero

With an opponent placed on an elevated surface, a wrestler applies a 3/4 facelock and then draws the opponent away, leaving only the opponent's feet over the elevated surface. The wrestler then falls backwards so that the opponent is forced to dive forward onto the top of their head due to the angle at which they are dropped. The elevated cutter can also be performed as a double team maneuver, including several variations such as the doomsday-style elevated cutter and the 3D. It is used by Danny Burch and Nigel McGuinness.

=== Fireman's carry cutter ===
Also known as the TKO (short for Total Knock Out), and innovated by Marc Mero. It is another elevated cutter variation in which the opponent is first raised over the shoulders of a wrestler in the fireman's carry position. From here, the attacking wrestler twists the opposite way and quickly switches back, throwing the opponent's legs out backwards and drops down to the mat while taking hold of the opponent's head to force them to fall into a high impact cutter. Nikki Bella used this move, calling it Rack Attack 2.0. Scorpio Sky and Sanada use this move, calling it TKO. WWE wrestler Austin Theory used to use this move, calling it Unproven Cutter. Karl Anderson also uses this move, naming it Swivel Gun Stun. This move was also used by former FCW/NXT/WWE superstar Alex Riley calling this move You're Dismissed. Samoa Joe used a jumping version of the move while pushing the opponent backwards.

=== Forward somersault cutter ===
A standing variation of the Diamond Dust in which the attacking wrestler jumps forward into a somersault over a seated or kneeling opponent while applying an inverted facelock, landing back-first with the opponent's face driven into the mat. A stunner variation is also possible. This move was innovated by Jason Kincaid, calling it Grave of the Fireflies. Jillian Hall used this move at one point. WWE wrestler Charlotte Flair uses this move as her finisher, calling it Natural Selection. During his tenure as Stardust, Cody Rhodes used this move as a signature move.

=== Front facelock cutter ===
This cutter variation sees the wrestler first lock the opponent in a front facelock or an inverted front facelock. The wrestler then pivots 180° and catches the opponent in a 3/4 facelock with their free arm before falling down into the cutter. This move is commonly known as the Twist of Fate and is associated with Matt and Jeff Hardy, as well as their former teammate, Lita. Ethan Page would later get permission from the Hardys to use this cutter as a finisher, calling it the Twisted Grin.

=== Handspring cutter ===
The wrestler performs a handspring and, as they jump backwards, they grab their opponent in a 3/4 facelock and fall backwards, dropping the opponent face-first into the mat. It is used by Penelope Ford, Fénix and Jay Lethal, the latter of whom calls it Lethal Injection.

=== Inverted suplex cutter ===
This variation sees the attacking wrestler execute an inverted suplex lift on the opponent before bringing them down face first with the cutter. Also known as the Osaka Street Cutter.

=== Jumping cutter ===
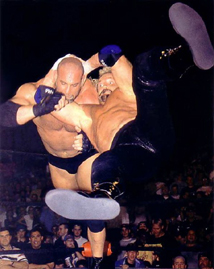
Diamond Dallas Page performing a diamond cutter on Goldberg

This cutter variation sees the wrestler jumping towards the opponent and grabbing the opponent's head in a 3/4 facelock while parallel to the ground, and then slamming the opponent's face to the mat in a cutter. This move was innovated by Johnny Ace as the Ace Crusher, popularized by Diamond Dallas Page as the Diamond Cutter and made even more popular by Randy Orton as his finishing move the RKO. Karl Anderson and Tama Tonga also use this variation, calling it the Gun Stun and Matt Riddle has used the RKO while teaming with Randy Orton. Ethan Page also uses this move, which he calls the Twisted Grin.

=== Over-the-shoulder cutter ===
Also known as a powerslam cutter, this variation sees the wrestler lifting the opponent onto their shoulders as in a front powerslam. Then, as the opponent is on the shoulder, the wrestler holds the head of the opponent and jumps and slams the opponent face-first to the mat in a cutter. The facebuster variation also exists.

==== Over-the-shoulder flip cutter ====
Also known as an Yokosuka Cutter. In this variation, the wrestler first lifts the opponent so that they are lying face up across one of the wrestler's shoulders, as in a Canadian backbreaker rack, before flipping the opponent over into the cutter. It is common for the wrestler to not properly apply the 3/4 facelock and the move to end up more in a DDT position. The move was innovated by Susumu Yokosuka and has since been used by several other wrestlers like Bobby Lashley and Buddy Matthews. This was also the finisher of former WCW and WWE Wrestler Chuck Palumbo as Full Throttle.

=== Pop-up cutter ===
The wrestler first pops the opponent up and then applies the 3/4 facelock and drops them into the cutter. It is used by Sanada which is also called TKO.

=== Rolling cutter ===
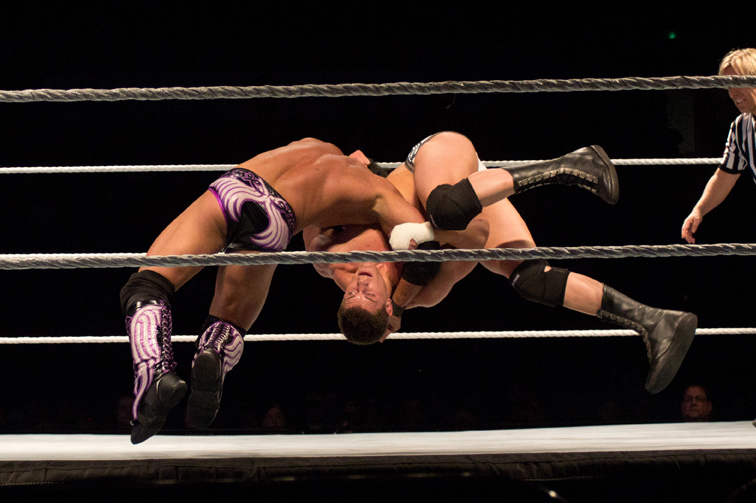
Cody Rhodes performing the Cross Rhodes (Rolling cutter) on Justin Gabriel

This version of a cutter sees the wrestler place an opponent in an inverted facelock, then spinning under the opponent while holding the facelock, twisting them into the cutter position. This move has two major variants. The first is an inward rolling cutter, in which the attacking wrestler rolls under the opponent while using their free arm to grab the opponent's nearest free arm, strikes their back in an upward motion to power the move, or a one-armed variant using the swinging motion to execute the move and is widely referred to as the Roll of the Dice and was popularized in North America by Reno and Christopher Daniels, the latter of whom uses the one-armed variant and calls it the Last Rites. Chris Hero popularized the variation pushing the opponent's back as his finisher, called the Hero's Welcome. Most famously, WWE wrestler Cody Rhodes uses the arm-trap variation as a finisher, calling it Cross Rhodes; during his time as Stardust, he referenced the move as the Queen's Crossbow. Damian Priest used this move as his finisher, calling it The Reckoning, prior to Rhodes returning to WWE in 2022. A modified version which involves hoisting the opponent off their feet before beginning the spin has also been used by other wrestlers. Hero also uses this lifting version called the Super Hero's Welcome.

The second major variation, which is known as an outward rolling cutter and referred to as a Whirling Dervish in Japan, sees the wrestler spin in the opposite direction while holding onto the opponent's free arm while twisting for leverage. This is used by Tama Tonga as the Tongan Twist. WWE wrestler Bo Dallas used this move, calling it Rollin' the Dice.

Another variation sees the wrestler roll forward before leaping to hit the opponent with a cutter. Fénix famously uses this variation. Mike Santana uses a variation where he rolls backwards before hitting a cutter, calling it the Rolling Buck 50.

=== Running cutter ===
This variation occurs when the wrestler runs up to the distracted/stunned opponent, applies a 3/4 facelock while parallel to the ground, and then slams the opponent's face to the mat in a cutter.

=== Springboard cutter ===
This variation of the cutter occurs when the wrestler puts the opponent in the 3/4 facelock, then usually runs towards the ropes, then jumps onto the second or third rope to bounce off it, turning in the air to land the cutter. This move was popularized by Spike Dudley, originally calling it the Acid Drop, and later Dudley Dog in WWE. David Finlay uses this move as the Acid Drop.

There is a variation where both wrestlers faces the ropes or turnbuckle. The attacking wrestler runs and jumps on the ropes and bounces back. As they fall, they catch the opponent into a 3/4 facelock and drop them in the cutter. This variation is popularized by Cody Rhodes and is called the Cody Cutter, as well as Will Ospreay, who calls it the OsCutter, and Mariah May as the MariCutter. Je'Von Evans also uses this move known as the OG Cutter. Sol Ruca uses a variation which sees her do a 360 flip off the ropes, known as the Sol Snatcher, as well as Dante Leon who calls it the Endseeker.

== See also ==
- Professional wrestling throws
