= Professional wrestling double-team maneuvers =

Professional wrestling moves executed by multiple people

In professional wrestling double-team maneuvers are executed by multiple wrestlers instead of one and typically are used by tag teams in tag team matches. Many of these maneuvers are combination of two throws, or submission holds. Most moves are known by the names that professional wrestlers give their "finishing move" (signature moves that usually result in a win) names. Occasionally, these names become popular and are used regardless of the wrestler performing the technique. Moves are listed under general categories whenever possible.

== Aided moves ==
These moves involve one wrestler actually performing the move to an opponent. An ally of the attacker will do something to make the move more effective. For example, a wrestler could perform a DDT on an opponent. However, an ally could lift the opponent' feet off the ground first, making it an Aided DDT, a much more effective variation of the move.

=== Aided brainbuster ===
An aided brainbuster sees one wrestler help another wrestler perform a brainbuster, usually by putting their own weight behind the move to increase its impact.

=== Aided Butterfly DDT ===
This move is best known as being the finisher used by NJPW tag team and Bullet Club members Guerrillas of Destiny. In this move, Tanga Loa has an opponent lifted up in a wheelbarrow hold, while Tama Tonga executes a Double-Arm DDT on the opponent.

=== Aided full nelson facebuster ===
This move is used by WWE Tag Team Awesome Truth as their finisher by name Truth Crushing Finale (TCF). In this move, The Miz an R-Truth execute their respective finishers, the Skull Crushing Finale (a full nelson facebuster) and the Lil'Jimmy (a Leaping flatliner) on their opponents at the same time to increase the velocity and effect of move.

=== Aided leapfrog body guillotine ===
This move sees an opponent with their upper body on the ropes and their feet on one of the attacking wrestler's shoulders, while the other wrestler charges at their partner, leapfrogging over them and straddling the opponent's lower back. This move was popularized by the World's Greatest Tag Team (Charlie Haas and Shelton Benjamin).

=== Aided neckbreaker ===
Any double-team move in which one wrestler helps another to perform a neckbreaker by twisting/forcing the opponent down to the mat harder while a neckbreaker is performed. Another version of an aided neckbreaker, known as an elevated neckbreaker, sees one member of the attacking tag team get the opponent up into an elevated position to allow a wrestler to perform a neckbreaker from a greater height.

=== Aided whiplash ===
This is a normal whiplash, but instead of having the opponent held in the air with the aid of the ring rope, they are kept in the elevated position by another wrestler. This wrestler has the opponent's legs on their shoulders and is facing the first wrestler. When the whiplash is performed, the extra wrestler will often twist down to the mat and land on top of the opponent. The move is also known as the Magic Killer or the Tornado-Plex. Originally used by Tomko and AJ Styles, it would then be used by Tomko and Giant Bernard before it was later used by Bernard and Karl Anderson, the latter of whom went on to also use it with Luke Gallows as part of the Good Brothers. Guerrillas of Destiny and Evil and Sanada also used it as well. This was also used by Rob Conway and Sylvain Grenier of La Résistance with this move being called Au Revoir.

=== Aided wheelbarrow facebuster ===
A wheelbarrow facebuster can be combined with many facebuster and DDT variations. While one wrestler holds an opponent in a wheelbarrow clutch the second wrestler applies a front facelock and DDT's the opponent while the other wrestler drops to a sitting position, driving the opponent's face to the mat, finishing the wheelbarrow facebuster.

=== Aided piledriver ===
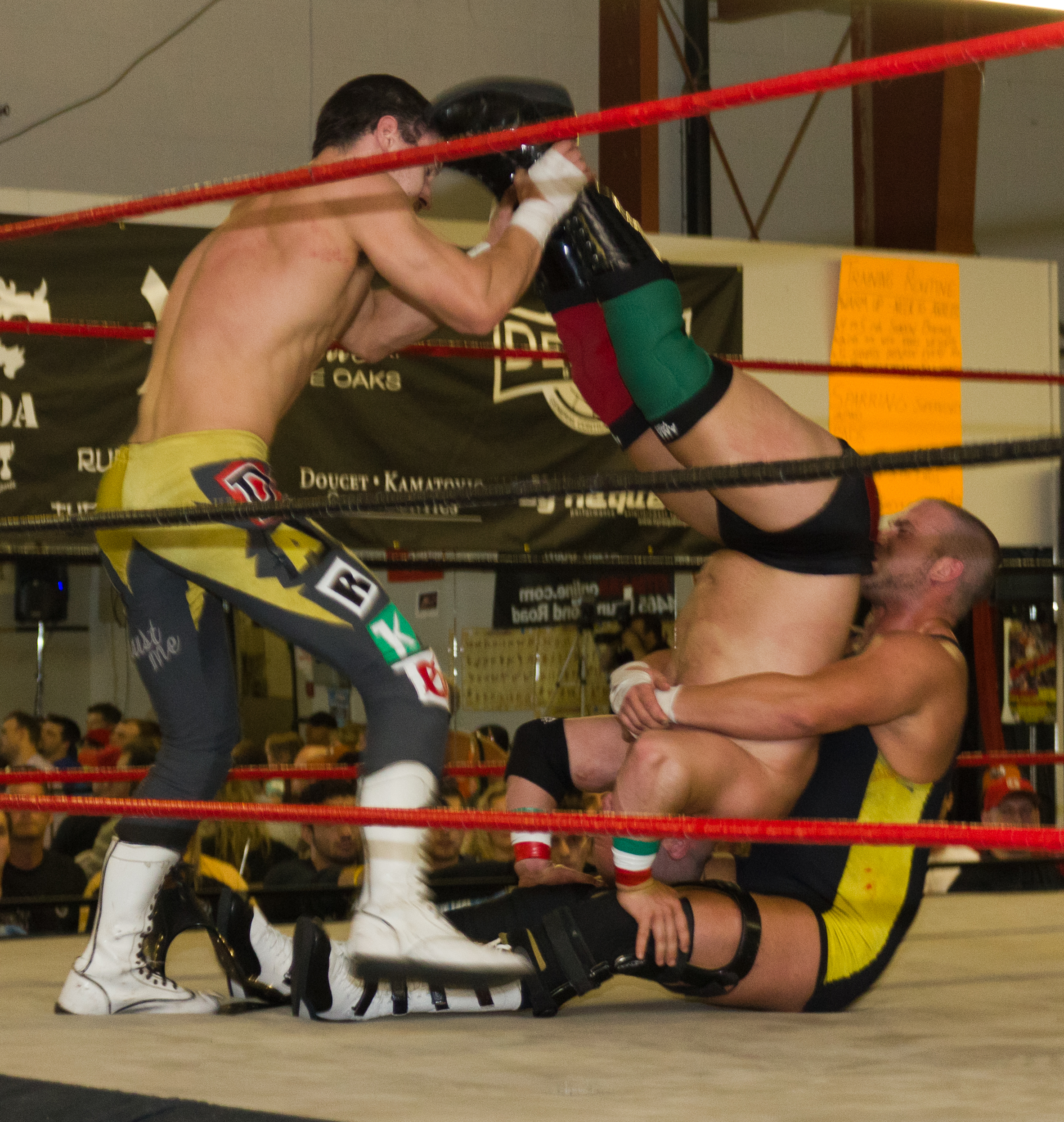
Two wrestlers execute an aided piledriver

Any double-team move in which one wrestler help another to perform a piledriver on an opponent by pushing down on the opponent’s foot for more impact. In a variation of the move, the second wrestler jumps off the turnbuckle while pushing the opponent’s feet downward for even more damage, this is well known as a spike piledriver (not to be confused with a one-person spike piledriver). The move was famously used by the Brain Busters, the New Age Outlaws, and FTR, the latter of which dubbed it the Mind Breaker.

=== Aided powerbomb ===
Also known as a spike powerbomb, this is any double-team (sometimes triple-team) move in which one wrestler help another to perform a powerbomb, either by aiding the wrestler to get the opponent up on to their shoulders or by pulling down on the opponent as they get dropped down, to force them into the mat harder. A three-person variation also exists, popularized by The Shield. The double team powerbomb is known as Old school Powerbomb, while the three-person variation is known as Triple Powerbomb.

==== Aided superbomb ====
In this version one partner sits on the top rope facing the ring. The second partner stands behind the opponent (both facing the first partner). The second partner then puts their head under one of the opponent's arms and lifts them into the air, placing them on the first partner's shoulders (with the opponent's legs around their neck). From there the first partner stands up and jumps forward, powerbombing the opponent from the second rope down to the ring. Although it was initially used by ECW tag team The Pitbulls, The Dudley Boyz went on to popularize this move, usually by putting their adversaries through tables.

=== Aided splash ===
This move starts with both partners on either the right or left side of an opponent who is lying face-up on the mat, with one partner in front of the other and both of them facing away from the opponent. The one closest to the opponent picks up the other partner and makes a 180° turn before dropping the partner on the opponent. The wrestler can lift their partner in a variety of ways (military press, wheelbarrow suplex, etc.) before dropping them on the opponent. Another variation starts with both partners on either the right or left side of an opponent who is lying face-up on the mat. The one closest to the opponent performs a military press on the other partner and before throwing them, while the other opponent performs a 360° Splash.

=== Aided suplex ===
Also known as double suplex, a double-team move in which one wrestler help another to perform a suplex, usually by putting their own weight behind the move to increase its impact.

==== Aided wheelbarrow suplex ====
This move sees one wrestler wrap a forward-facing opponent's legs around their waist and apply a gutwrench hold to lift the opponent up off the ground. The partner then steps in front of both wrestlers and grabs the opponent's arms or shoulders and yanks them upward, just as the first attacker throws themself and the victim backwards in a wheelbarrow suplex. This increases the momentum with which the victim is thrown backwards onto their upper back, neck, and head.

=== Aided Super-Plex ===
This move was famously used by the former tag team The British Bulldogs. This move is done by one superstar placing an opponent on the top turnbuckle where his partner would perform a Super-plex on their opponent.

=== Aided headscissors takedown ===
This move sees one wrestler grab their partner's body while the partner is wrapping their legs around the opponent's neck. Then the partner swings and executes a headscissors takedown.

=== Power-Plex ===
This was the finishing move of the tag team known as Power and Glory (Hercules Hernandez and Paul Roma). Hercules would take an opponent and sit him on the top turnbuckle (as to set up a superplex) near his partner Roma. When Hercules set up the opponent and was ready to perform the superplex, he would tag in Roma. Roma would run to the next turnbuckle and climb up. As Hercules executed the superplex, Roma would fly off the top turnbuckle with a splash, timing the landing on the opponent so that he would hit immediately after Hercules landed.

=== Elevated jawbreaker ===
With an opponent kept up in an elevated position by one wrestler, another wrestler has chance to drop the opponent into any type of jawbreaker from a raised height. Most notably this sees the opponent's legs being held on the shoulders of one wrestler while another wrestler catches hold of the head of this opponent. At this point the wrestler will lock a hold onto the head of the opponent and drop them into the jawbreaker.

=== Elevated splash ===
This is where one wrestler (usually a larger wrestler) backs up to the corner turnbuckles and allows another wrestler to climb the turnbuckle, then up onto their shoulders. This wrestler then jumps off to perform any type of diving splash (i.e. Shooting star press) on a supine opponent. Sometimes this move sees the first wrestler climb up on the turnbuckle as well, getting even higher before the second wrestler gets up and jumps off them.

=== Rocket Launcher ===
One wrestler ascends the top turnbuckle. Their partner then stands below them and reaches up, taking hold of them. The wrestler on the top rope then performs a flying body splash, with their partner throwing them, thus increasing their range, height, and impact. This move was named and innovated by The Midnight Express. A variation of this move has the throwing partner pressing down on the back of the falling partner to further increase the impact. This move was formerly used by Enzo Amore and Big Cass, who called it Bada Boom Shakalaka. Another variation of this move has the elbow drop, which is currently used by Bullet Club.

=== Assisted senton ===
One of the wrestlers ascends the top turnbuckle. Their partner then stands below them and reaches up, taking hold of them. The wrestler on the top rope then performs a top rope diving attack, with their partner throwing them, thus increasing their range and height.

== Move combinations ==
This refers to a move in which two attackers perform separate moves on an opponent at the same time. A popular example of this would be the X-Mark performed by D-Generation X, where Shawn Michaels hits the Sweet Chin Music on an opponent, then followed up by a Pedigree by Triple H.

=== Belly-to-back combinations ===
==== Belly-to-back suplex, diving leg drop combination ====
One attacking wrestler performs a belly-to-back suplex while their partner climbs a turnbuckle. The attacking wrestler holds the opponent at the apex while the second wrestler performs a diving leg drop, driving the opponent into the mat. The Viking Raiders use this move as their tag team finisher called Fallout. Sasha Banks and Bayley also use this move.

=== Spinebuster combinations ===
==== Spinebuster, leg lariat combination ====
Where one wrestler performs a spinebuster on their opponent while the opponent is being attacked by a leg lariat from the wrestler's partner. This move was innovated by the Hype Bros (Zack Ryder and Mojo Rawley), who called it the Hype Ryder.

=== Powerbomb combinations ===
==== Powerbomb, chokeslam combination ====
This variation sees one of the wrestlers grasps the opponent's neck, lifts them up, while the partner behind them catches the opponent's legs. Simultaneously, the front wrestler will complete the chokeslam, and the back wrestler will complete the powerbomb.

==== Powerbomb, double knee backbreaker combination ====
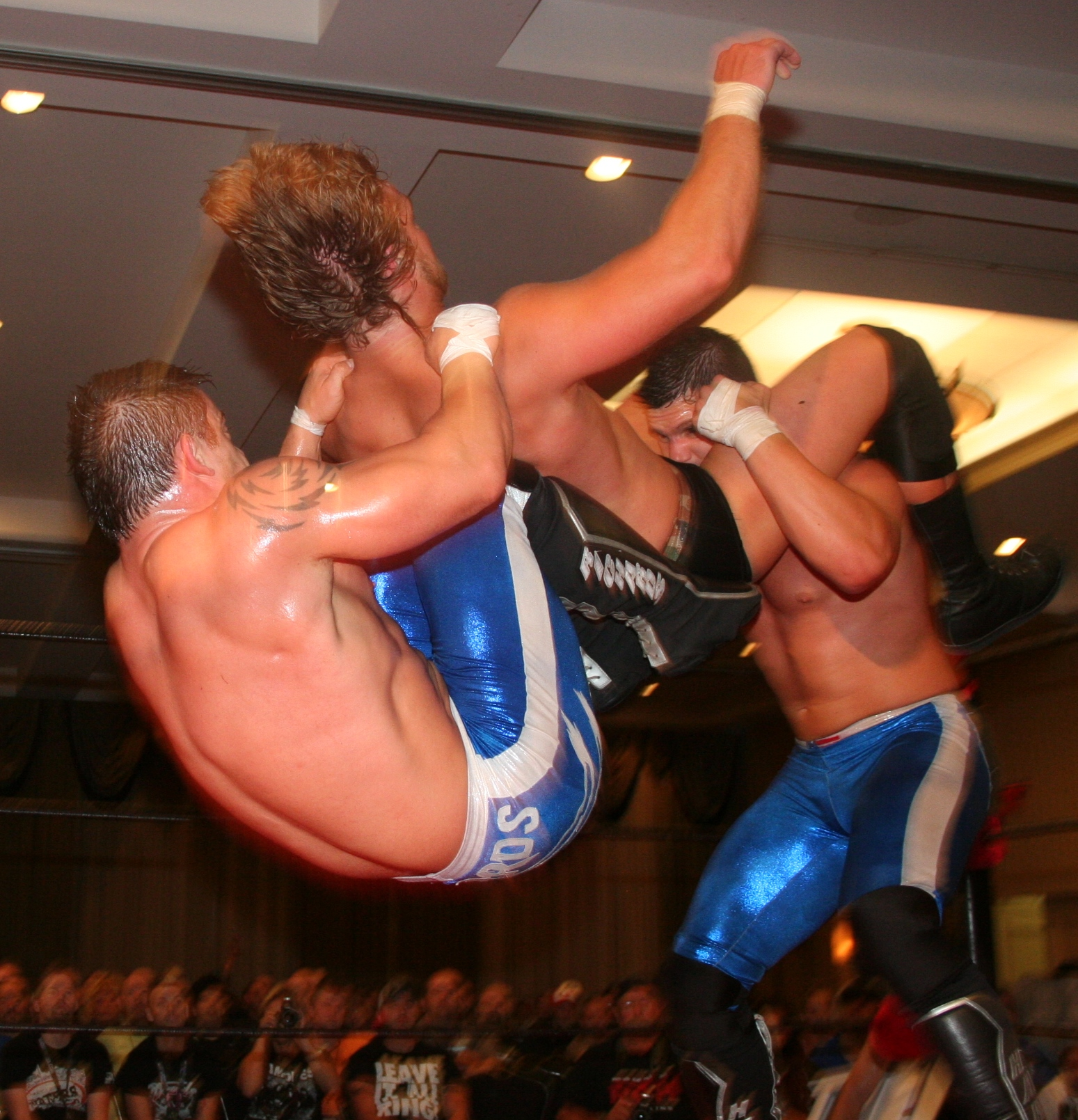
The American Wolves (Eddie Edwards and Davey Richards) performing a powerbomb-double knee backbreaker combination on Adam Page.

One wrestler sets up the opponent for a powerbomb while their partner is positioned in front of them. The partner then leaps upwards, grabbing the opponent from behind by the chin, and pulling them down into a double knee backbreaker while the first wrestler delivers the powerbomb.

==== Powerbomb, neckbreaker combination ====
This elevated neckbreaker is performed when one attacking wrestler stands facing a bent-over opponent and seizes the opponent around the waist, flipping them over as in a suplex up onto another wrestler's shoulders, leaving them in a prone powerbomb position. The first wrestler keeps hold of the opponent's head at this point, holding it against their shoulder as with a hangman's neckbreaker while keeping the opponent's back and head parallel with the ground. From here the first wrestler falls to a sitting position while the other wrestler, who is holding the opponent in the powerbomb position, drops to their knees, thus driving the neck of the opponent into the shoulder of this wrestler from an elevated position. Beer Money, Inc. members James Storm and Bobby Roode would use this move as their tag team finisher, naming the move Drinking While Investing. This move also used by the Authors of Pain.

==== Powerbomb, diving attack combination ====
One wrestler sets up the opponent for a powerbomb with their back to a turnbuckle, while their partner climbs that same turnbuckle. The first attacking wrestler then holds the opponent at the apex of the powerbomb while the second dives off the top rope and impacts the opponent with an aerial attack, often a clothesline or a seated senton, driving the opponent backwards and completing the partner's powerbomb with added force. Certain attacks can also be timed so that, instead of hitting the opponent at the apex of the move, they can impact at the exact moment the powerbomb impacts the opponent on the floor. Like all the below variations, this move does not have to see the second attacking wrestler dive from the turnbuckle; it can be performed from any elevated surface, or alternatively the wrestler could springboard off the ring ropes to gain height.

===== Powerbomb, diving clothesline combination =====
One wrestler sets up the opponent for a powerbomb with their back to a turnbuckle while their partner climbs that same turnbuckle. The first attacking wrestler then holds the opponent at the apex of the powerbomb while the second dives off the top rope and impacts the opponent with a diving clothesline or a flying lariat, driving the opponent backwards and finishing the powerbomb with extra force.

===== Powerbomb, diving crossbody combination =====
One wrestler sets up the opponent for a powerbomb with their back to a turnbuckle, while their partner climbs that same turnbuckle. The first attacking wrestler then holds the opponent at the apex of the powerbomb, while the second dives off the top rope and impacts the opponent with a diving crossbody driving the opponent backwards and finishing the powerbomb with extra force.

===== Powerbomb, missile dropkick combination =====
One wrestler sets up the opponent for a powerbomb with their back to a turnbuckle while their partner climbs that same turnbuckle. The first attacking wrestler then holds the opponent at the apex of the powerbomb while the second dives off the top rope and impacts the opponent with a missile dropkick, driving the opponent backwards and finishing the powerbomb with extra force. This was also used by the WCW Tag Team Harlem Heat as the Heat Seeker.

===== Powerbomb, diving elbow drop combination =====
One wrestler sets up the opponent for a powerbomb with their back to a turnbuckle, while their partner climbs that same turnbuckle. The first attacking wrestler then holds the opponent at the apex of the powerbomb, while the second dives off the top rope and impacts the opponent with a diving elbow drop, driving the opponent backwards and finishing the powerbomb with extra force. This double team move was also another finisher move used by WCW Tag Team Harlem Heat as the Heat Bomb.

===== Powerbomb, diving leg drop combination =====
One wrestler sets up the opponent for a powerbomb with their back to a turnbuckle, while their partner climbs that same turnbuckle. The first attacking wrestler then holds the opponent at the apex of the powerbomb, while the second dives off the top rope and impacts the opponent with a diving leg drop just as the opponent lands on the mat, crushing their neck, face, or chest. The leg drop can sometimes be a somersault variation.

===== Powerbomb, diving neckbreaker combination =====
One wrestler sets up the opponent for a powerbomb with their back to a turnbuckle while their partner climbs that same turnbuckle. The first attacking wrestler then holds the opponent at the apex of the powerbomb while the second dives off the top rope and impacts the opponent with a diving neckbreaker, driving the opponent backwards and finishing the powerbomb with extra force.

===== Powerbomb, diving seated senton combination =====
One wrestler sets up the opponent for a powerbomb with their back to a turnbuckle, while their partner climbs that same turnbuckle. The first attacking wrestler then holds the opponent at the apex of the powerbomb, while the second dives off the top rope and impacts the opponent with a diving seated senton, driving the opponent backwards and finishing the powerbomb with extra force. A somersault variation can also be used. Edge and Rey Mysterio used this as the Bombs Away

===== Powerbomb, diving spear combination =====
One wrestler sets up the opponent for a powerbomb with their back to a turnbuckle, while their partner climbs that same turnbuckle. The first attacking wrestler then holds the opponent at the apex of the powerbomb, while the second dives off the top rope and impacts the opponent with a diving spear, driving the opponent backwards and finishing the powerbomb with extra force.

==== Powerbomb, shiranui combination ====
This device variation sees one of the wrestlers lift the opponent onto their shoulders, into the powerbomb position, while standing with their back to the corner turnbuckles. Another wrestler then climbs to the top turnbuckle, faces away from the ring, and grabs a three-quarter facelock on the opponent, performing a shiranui, while the other wrestler slams the opponent down.

==== Powerbomb, suplex combination ====
This variation sees one of the wrestlers perform a suplex, but the partner behind them catches the opponent's waist. At that point, the front wrestler will complete a suplex, and the back wrestler will complete their powerbomb.

=== Neckbreaker/Cutter combinations ===
==== Argentine rack, neckbreaker combination ====
This move first sees one wrestler place an opponent in an Argentine backbreaker rack where the opponent is held face-up across both shoulders of the attacking wrestler. The second attacking wrestler then grabs the racked opponent's head and, along with the first wrestler, falls to the ground, driving the opponent's head and neck into the mat below. Another variation is when the attacking wrestler falls backwards and the partner then does a cutter on the opponent as they falls face first into the mat.

==== Belly-to-back suplex, neckbreaker combination ====
This elevated neckbreaker is a combination of a belly-to-back suplex and a neckbreaker. This maneuver sees an opponent get pushed upwards in a belly-to-back suplex lift by one partner, then as the opponent falls to the mat, the other partner applies a headlock neckbreaker, forcing the opponent's head into the mat. This was the finisher used by Bo Dallas and Curtis Axel when they teamed together.

==== Spinebuster, neckbreaker combination ====
This move starts with one of the attackers facing the opponent and the other attacker behind the opponent. The attacker in front of the opponent grabs the opponent around the waist and lifts them up, while the partner who is behind the opponent reaches over their shoulder and takes hold of the opponent by their head or neck. Both partners fall to the mat simultaneously so the attacker in the front falls on top of the opponent and the attacker from the back falls to their back.

==== Neckbreaker, diving crossbody combination ====
This move sees one of the attacking wrestlers stand back-to-back with the opponent, reach over their shoulder, take hold of the opponent by their head or neck, and take a couple of steps forward so that the opponent's torso is facing the sky. Meanwhile, the other attacking wrestler climbs the top turnbuckle and jumps from the top turnbuckle onto the opponent's chest, while the attacker holding the opponent's neck falls to the mat onto their back to drive the opponent's back and neck into the mat so both wrestlers end up falling simultaneously to the mat. This move was adopted by the Motor City Machine Guns as Skull and Bones.

==== Death Drop ====
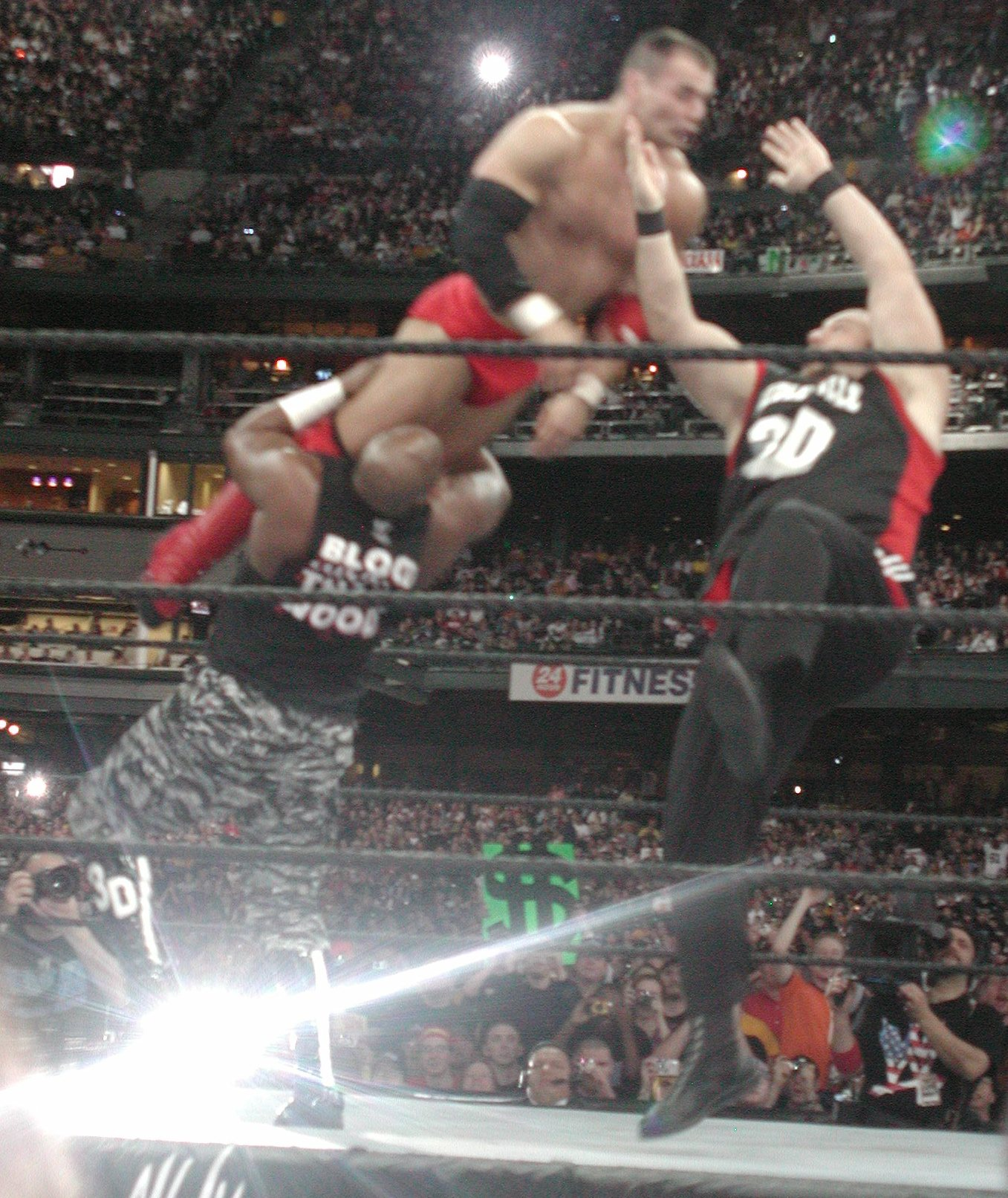
D-Von Dudley (left) and Bubba Ray Dudley (right) performing the Dudley Death Drop (3D) on Lance Storm.

This can refer to one of two moves. The traditional version features a combination of a flapjack and a cutter. This maneuver sees an opponent get pushed upwards in a flapjack throw by one partner; then, as the opponent falls to the mat, the other partner applies a cutter, forcing the opponent's head down to the mat. The alternative version starts with one attacker performing a delayed back drop. A second attacker will grab the defending wrestler's head and rest it on their own shoulder. Both attackers then drop to their backs simultaneously, delivering the back drop and a neckbreaker to the defending wrestler. The move was popularized by WWE Hall of Famers the Dudley Boyz as the Dudley Death Drop, or 3D for short. The Usos would adopt their move in 2022 as the One and Done (often referred to as the 1D). Variations include the Shatter Machine (later renamed the Goodnight Express) notably used by FTR, where the flapjack is dropped into a double knee facebreaker, and the 3K used by Roppongi 3K, where the flapjack is dropped into a reverse STO.

==== Samoan drop, neckbreaker combination ====
One wrestler (usually the larger one) places an opponent over their shoulders in the fireman's carry position while the other attacking wrestler runs and jumps up alongside both and takes hold or twists the neck of the opponent for any type of neckbreaker slam, as the first wrestler falls down to the mat, forcing the opponent down with them in a Samoan drop. This can see the wrestler performing the fireman's carry turn on the spot (an airplane spin) while the other charges at them and performs the neckbreaker as they spins. Another variation is when someone holds the opponent in a fireman's carry position. The partner then gives the opponent a side headlock and, at the same time, they do a double rolling somersault into a combination of the rolling fireman's carry slam and the corkscrew neckbreaker. The former WWE Tag Team Cryme Tyme used the Samoan Drop/Corkscrew Neckbreaker, dubbing it G9.

==== Gory bomb, cutter combination ====
One partner sets up a Gory bomb on the opponent, while their partner stands to their back side. When the original partner releases the opponent, the second executes a cutter as the opponent falls.

==== Wheelbarrow facebuster, cutter combination ====
This move first sees one wrestler place an opponent in a wheelbarrow facebuster position while the other wrestler applies a three-quarter facelock. One wrestler then drops to their back as their partner drops to a sit out position, performing a cutter and a wheelbarrow facebuster.

==== Inverted powerbomb, running cutter combination ====
This variation sees one of the wrestlers lift the opponent into a Canadian backbreaker rack. From this position the second wrestler runs towards the opponent and grabs their head, performing a running cutter, while the other wrestler completes the inverted powerbomb, driving the opponent face-first to the mat. Roppongi 3K used this move as Stargazer 3K.

=== Backbreaker combinations ===
==== Backbreaker hold, diving attack combination ====
One wrestler hits a pendulum backbreaker and holds the opponent over their knee as another wrestler jumps down from the top rope and performs a diving attack.

===== Backbreaker hold, diving elbow drop combination =====
This variation sees the partner on the top rope hit the opponent with a diving elbow drop from the middle or top rope on the exposed head or chest, flipping the opponent over and down to the mat. This was the finisher move of former WWE Tag Team The Prime Time Players calling it the Ghetto Blaster. It was also used by former WWF Tag Team Demolition as Demolition Decapitation.

===== Backbreaker hold, diving leg drop combination =====
This variation sees the partner on the top rope hit the opponent with a diving leg drop to their exposed head, flipping the opponent over and down to the mat. This was also used by WCW Tag Team Harlem Heat as Towering Inferno.

=== Bearhug combinations ===
==== Bearhug hold, attack combination ====
One of a number of double team moves in which one partner holds the victim in a bear hug while the other partner either runs or dives at the elevated victim and impacts them in the chest, neck, or face, driving them backwards into the ground in the process. As a variant of the bear hug/attack combination, the holding wrestler can instead use a spinebuster, driving the opponent down instead of releasing them.

==== Bearhug hold, flying crossbody combination ====
One wrestler would apply a bear hug and elevate the opponent while the other wrestler executed a flying body press from the top rope, driving the opponent to the ground from an elevated height.

==== Bearhug hold, high kick combination ====
One wrestler would apply a bear hug and elevate the opponent while the other wrestler executed a high dropkick or other high kicks as the first wrestler drops the opponent to the ground. WWE Hall of Famer Booker T would execute a Harlem Sidekick while he teamed with Goldust or with Stevie Ray during their time in WCW as Harlem Heat, which they called the "Big Apple Blast".

==== Bearhug hold, seated senton combination ====
One wrestler would apply a bear hug to the victim while their partner climbed the turnbuckle behind them. The second partner then dived off the turnbuckle, performing a seated senton on the victim, driving them out of the partner's arms and into the mat. This was the finisher move of the WWF Tag Team The Quebecers.

==== Bearhug hold, superkick, jackknife pin combination ====
One wrestler would apply a bear hug while the other wrestler executed a superkick to the face of the opponent. The opponent would fall backwards, and the partner applying the bearhug would roll forward with their momentum, flipping over into a bridge position, holding both legs and ending up in a jackknife pinning position.

==== Bearhug hold, diving leg drop combination ====
Commonly referred to as the "Death Sentence", also referred to as an aided guillotine leg drop. In this move one wrestler would apply a bear hug and hold the opponent out as another wrestler jumped down to hit the opponent with a diving leg drop to their exposed head or torso, forcing the opponent back down hard to the mat. The Midnight Express used this move as the Veg-O-Matic.

==== Hart Attack ====
Technically known as a bear hug, lariat combination, this was the traditional finishing move of The Hart Foundation (Bret Hart and Jim Neidhart). Neidhart would lift the opponent in a bearhug in the center of the ring, while Hart leaned against the ringside ropes, facing the opponent's back. Hart would then run past the two and bounce off the ropes on the opposite side of the ring. On his return, Hart would make a running leap and perform a lariat takedown on the opponent as Neidhart let go of him, resulting in both Hart and the opponent falling onto their backs. Hart sometimes did the lariat takedown from the second corner rope. The Hart Dynasty have used a variant of this move in which Tyson Kidd would springboard from the top rope to perform the lariat takedown on a prone opponent held by David Hart Smith. Beth Phoenix and Natalya did that move as a tribute to Jim Neidhart.

=== High and Low combinations ===
A "high and low" double team maneuver is a type of takedown that sees two wrestlers hit a combination of attacks on a standing opponent; one aimed to hit high, while the other is aimed low. The high attack usually comes from in front of the opponent, while the low attack comes from behind or front, sending the opponent back-first into the mat with greater force.

==== Lariat, running chop block combination ====
The attacking wrestlers stand on opposite sides of an opponent (front and back). The wrestler facing the front then executes a running lariat while the wrestler from behind executes a running chop block knocking the opponent backwards. The Midnight Express named their version of this move the Double Goozle.

==== Lariat, spear combination ====
Both wrestlers simultaneously charges an opponent. One wrestler executes a lariat while the other executes a spear on the other side, forcing the opponent to the ground after impact of the combined maneuvers.

==== Superkick, spinning leg sweep combination ====
Both wrestlers stand facing a standing opponent. One wrestler executes the legsweep while the other attempts a superkick making the opponent fall after impact of the combined maneuvers.

==== Shoot kick, shining wizard combination ====
The attacking wrestlers are the on opposite sides of an opponent (front and back). The wrestler facing the back then executes a Shoot kick to the back of the opponent's knee then The wrestler facing the front then executes a Shining Wizard.

==== Total Elimination ====
This high and low move, named and popularized by The Eliminators (Perry Saturn and John Kronus), sees both wrestlers stand facing a standing opponent before Saturn executes a spinning leg sweep to the back of the opponent's legs, and Kronus executes a spinning heel-kick towards the opponent simultaneously, knocking the opponent backwards. Another version is performed by The Beautiful People (Angelina Love and Velvet Sky), called the Makeover. The execution involves Love with a high roundhouse kick to the chest and Velvet with a low roundhouse kick to the legs to sweep their feet, simultaneously, knocking the opponent backwards. A running variation of the move is used by The Ascension (Konnor and Viktor) called the Fall of Man. In this variant, Konnor hits the leg sweep and Viktor hits a jumping European uppercut on the opponent, both men starting from opposite corners. They once used the original Total Elimination while still calling it the "Fall of Man". The Colóns (Epico and Primo Colón), during their tenure as The Shining Stars, use a variation slightly modified from the original Total Elimination calling it The Shining Star. This variation involves Primo hitting a legsweep and Epico hitting a jumping gamengiri. reDRagon (Bobby Fish and Kyle O'Reilly) use a version in which instead of a spinning heel kick, Fish uses a high knee called the Flying Fish Hook, while Roderick Strong performs a running single leg dropkick called the Sick Kick while teaming up with O'Reilly; when Fish teams with O'Reilly, the move is called the High-Low. Edge and Damian Priest use a version in which instead of a spinning heel kick, Edge performs a spear. Toxic Attraction members Gigi Dolin and Jacy Jayne use a variation where Dolin performs a low roundhouse kick while Jayne performs a running discus big boot at the same time, this particular variation is called the Toxic Shock. Briggs and Jensen use a version which instead of using their feet, they use their fists with Briggs performing a lariat and Jensen performing a low sweeping hook.

== Dive combination ==
This refers to a series of specific move types. The first move is a grapple moves performed by the first attacker to the opponent. This then leaves them prone to a second, this time diving, attack from the second attacker. These usually include at least one finishing move. The most common kind sees the first attacker perform a grapple move in the ring, which leaves the defending wrestler prone to a diving attack from another attacker. Wrestlers who have a dive combination attack usually perform exactly the same moves each time. They also tend to use their own half of the combination alone in singles matches. The most famous example is the version by Matt and Jeff Hardy. Matt would perform his "Twist of Fate", leaving the opponent prone to Jeff's "Swanton Bomb".

=== Diving headbutt low blow ===
While one wrestler slams an opponent and spreads their legs apart the other wrestler would climb the turnbuckle and perform a diving headbutt into the opponent's groin. The Dudley Boyz use this tag team move, calling it Whassup?.

=== Diving leg drop low blow ===
While one wrestler slams an opponent and spreads their legs apart the other wrestler would climb the turnbuckle and perform a diving extreme leg drop into the opponent's groin.

=== Suplex, diving attack combination ===
One wrestler would apply a delayed vertical suplex and elevate the opponent while the other wrestler executed a diving attack like a diving crossbody or a missile dropkick, driving the opponent to the ground from an elevated height. The Missile Dropkick variant was used by the former WWF Tag Team The Rockers calling this move the Rocker-Plex.

== Slingshot catapult, attack combination ==
The first wrestler performs a slingshot catapult on the opponent sending them towards their partner while their partner performs an attack on the prone opponent, knocking them back down with greater force.

=== Slingshot catapult, clothesline combination ===
The first wrestler performs a slingshot catapult on the opponent sending them towards their partner while their partner sticks their arm out and does a clothesline, knocking the opponent down. Other variations use variants of the clothesline like the more impactful lariat, or the partner goes to the top rope and performs a clothesline off the top rope

=== Slingshot catapult, knockout punch ===
The first wrestler does a slingshot catapult to their opponent, catapulting them towards their partner while their partner hits the opponent with a punch such as a Backfist or an Uppercut. The Fabulous Kangaroos were known for using this maneuver, naming it the Boomerang.

=== Slingshot catapult, missile dropkick combination ===
The first wrestler performs a slingshot catapult on the opponent, sending them flying towards the opposite turnbuckle. The partner then jumps off that turnbuckle and delivers a missile dropkick to the opponent in midair.

=== Slingshot catapult, diving bulldog combination ===
The first wrestler performs a slingshot catapult in an attempt to throw the opponent away from the corner turnbuckle away from where the second wrestler is situated. As the opponent is lifted off the ground up into the apex of the throw, the second wrestler dives off the turnbuckle and performs a diving bulldog on that same opponent, forcing their head down into the mat.

=== Other combinations ===
==== Doomsday device ====
A move in which one wrestler hoists the opponent on their shoulders in the electric chair position, while another wrestler climbs to the top turnbuckle and delivers a flying attack on the opponent, often resulting in the opponent doing a back flip and landing in the prone position.

==== Flapjack DDT ====
One of the most common double team elevated DDT is known as a flapjack DDT, a combination of a flapjack and a DDT. This maneuver sees an opponent get pushed upwards in air during a flapjack attempt, then just as the opponent falls to the mat, the wrestler's partner will put opponent in a front facelock, and as all three fall down to the mat, the DDT will ensure the opponent is forced to dive forward onto their own head. This was the Finisher of WWE Tag Team MNM calling this "Snapshot".

== Arm wringer, hair pull mat slam ==
This move, primarily used by female wrestlers, sees both of the attacker wrestlers facing one side of the opponent, taking both of the target's arms to apply an arm wringer, and then take the opponent's head or hair and pull it back, forcing the back of the opponent's head into the mat. The variation can also be made with the attackers hitting the back of the opponent's feet to then force them fall to the mat or done by using an STO.

== Leg drop, splash combination ==
This type of combination sees two wrestlers simultaneously execute any type of splash and leg drop on one prone opponent lying on the mat. However, the double team move is not limited to grounded variations of splashes and leg drops. Many wrestlers utilize aerial versions, or versions where one of the two attacks come from an elevated position. Nova and Chris Chetti popularized this variation, naming it "Tidal Wave".

The most common elevated version of this, known as the "Event Omega", sees the opponent lying prone on the mat while both wrestlers climb on opposite turnbuckles, or occasionally ladders, and come down simultaneously with a diving leg drop and a diving splash.

== Poetry in Motion ==
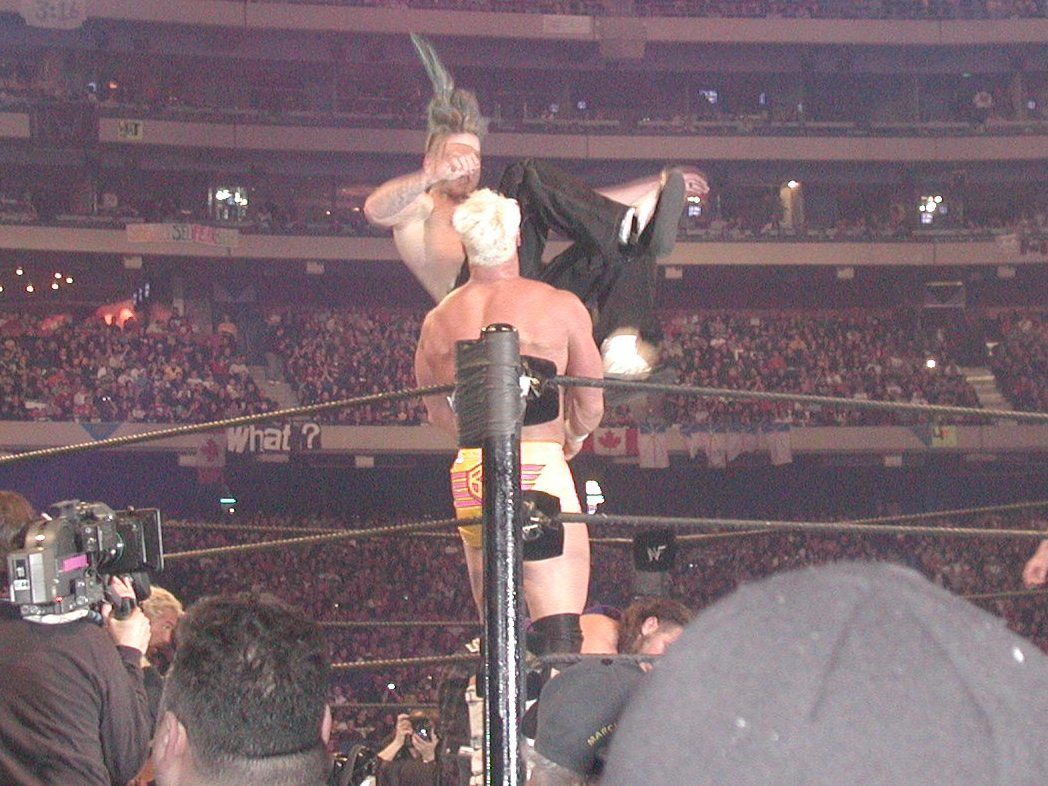
The Hardy Boyz performing "Poetry in Motion" on Billy Gunn.

This move sees one wrestler either place or Irish whip their opponent into the turnbuckle. The same wrestler then gets down on all fours, and their partner runs from the opposite side of the ring/opposite turnbuckle, leaps off their partner's back, and performs an aided splash/calf kick/heel kick/leg lariat/dropkick, or in some rare instances, a leg drop on the opponent. A one-person version involves leaping off one or more chairs instead of a partner. If the move is done with a chair in hand, it is usually a dropkick version, with the attacker driving the chair into the opponent. The Hardy Boyz innovated said maneuver and used it as a double-team signature move, usually utilizing the leg lariat as the attack. It was named by Michael Cole, and Jeff Hardy also uses the solo version.

== Tandem moves ==
This is when both attacking wrestlers perform exactly the same move to the same opponent at the same time, thus increasing the damage inflicted by the move.

=== Con-chair-to ===
This move consists of a double chair shot to the head of an opponent, one from either side hitting the back of the head and the face of an opponent simultaneously. There is also a solo variation of the move known as a one man con-chair-to, where the opponent's head is lying on a chair on the mat and the attacker slams another chair on their head. The name of the move is derived from the musical term "concerto". It was invented by the tag team of Edge and Christian.

=== Double bulldog ===
A double bulldog is when two wrestlers both hit a bulldog on a single opponent. It can also refer to two bulldogs being performed by one wrestler on two opponents at the same time.

=== Double butt splash ===
A double butt splash is when two wrestlers both run into on a single opponent. Usually done on to an opponent hanging on the ropes or an opponent in a corner.

=== Double cutter ===
A double cutter sees the attacking wrestlers first stand either side of an opponent and apply a three-quarter facelock (reaching behind the head of an opponent, thus pulling the opponent's jaw above each of the wrestler's shoulders) before both (moving forwards and) falling backwards to force the opponent face first to the mat below. It can also be performed by one wrestler on two opponents at the same time. However, due to the face lock the opponent's face often never reaches the mat, instead lands on the shoulders of the attacking wrestlers. Former WWE World Tag Team Champion Rated-RKO used this move briefly, as the cutter is member Randy Orton's finisher as the namesake RKO.

=== Double chokeslam ===
When two wrestlers execute a chokeslam on a single opponent at the same time it is referred to as a double chokeslam. Due to convenience of wording, a double chokeslam can also refer to two chokeslams being performed by one wrestler on two opponents at the same time (i.e.; single person double chokeslam), and occasionally in a tag team match where each member of one team will chokeslam a member of the opposing team (i.e.; two person simultaneous chokeslams) which can also be referred to as stereo chokeslams. The traditional version is also referred to as a double spinebuster / double front slam as the action of lifting an opponent up and throwing them down are much the same, though the spinebuster, and front slam are more common on a charging opponent. This move was used by Brothers of Destruction and KroniK. Mace and T-Bar uses a sitout version of this move called High Justice.

=== Double clothesline ===
Two wrestlers both hitting a clothesline on a single opponent by joining hands at the same time. It can also be performed by one wrestler on two opponents at the same time.

=== Double crucifix powerbomb ===
This two-person version of a crucifix powerbomb sees a single opponent lifted between two wrestlers so that the opponent is being lifted by their spread arms. At the apex of the move where the opponent is raised to the highest point, it will look as though they have been crucified. At this point the attacking wrestlers then kneel and bend forwards to throw the opponent forward to the mat onto their back or neck and shoulders. It was popularized on the independent scene as the "T-Gimmick" by The Backseat Boyz. Another inverted triple-team variation known as "Ragnarok" was used by the Bruderschaft des Kreuzes in Chikara where Claudio Castagnoli and Tursas lift the opponent up by their arms, while Ares runs through and pushes their legs back so that they flip over into a double team iconoclasm by Castagnoli and Tursas.

=== Double DDT ===
When two wrestlers both hit a DDT on a single opponent by standing either side of the opponent and applying the front facelock before hitting the move. This move can see more than one opponent be headlocked, using the wrestlers free arms, to become a seemingly indefinite line of wrestlers and opponents all linked together. A double DDT can also refer to two DDTs being performed by one wrestler on two opponents at the same time. Another reference, also known as stereo DDTs, sees two wrestlers performing a DDT on two different people at the same time.

==== Double inverted DDT ====
This is similar to a normal double DDT only that they are in an inverted headlock and drop them in the back of the head.

==== Double lifting DDT ====
This is similar to a normal double DDT except for the fact that both wrestlers jump and lift the opponent.

==== Double shiranui ====
This double team DDT sees two attacking wrestlers perform the shiranui variation on one single opponent, with each wrestler applying the three-quarter facelock from opposing sides of the opponent. Like the shiranui, this double team version can be performed from both a standing and elevated position.

=== Double dropkick ===
When two wrestlers simultaneously hit a dropkick on a single opponent. Attacking wrestlers may both target the front or back of the opponent, or sometimes "sandwich" the opponent by dropkicking them from either side. The Rock 'n' Roll Express used this dropkick maneuver as their finishing move.

==== Double missile dropkick ====
Similar to the double dropkick, both wrestlers execute missile dropkicks from adjacent turnbuckles onto a single opponent. This can be botched if both didn't execute properly, as evident when Edge and Rey Mysterio performed on Christopher Nowinski in which Edge's body landed on Nowinski head that caused his post-concussion symptoms and early retirement.

=== Double drop toe-hold ===
In a double drop toe-hold two wrestlers hit a drop toe-hold on each leg of a single opponent.

=== Double elbow drop ===
This is a double team maneuver which involves two wrestlers hitting a variations of an elbow drop (standing, or flying) on one person at the same time. Often this move sees two wrestlers knock down a charging opponent leaving the opponent in a position in which both wrestlers can stand either side of the fallen opponent and before elbow drops. These elbow drops are often preceded by some sort of dance/taunt or the joining of hands, or otherwise, with the specific wrestler's theatrics. This was popularized by the Rock 'n' Sock Connection, as an elbow drop is one of member The Rock's signature moves.

=== Double enzuigiri ===
This is a double team maneuver in which both attacking wrestlers will perform an Enzuigiri on a single opponent, each from different sides.

=== Double extreme leg drop ===
This move, innovated, named and popularized by the Hardy Boyz, sees one wrestler (Matt) climb to the top turnbuckle while their partner (Jeff) holds up the opponent's legs (the opponent is perpendicular to the wrestler on the top rope). Then, the wrestler on the top rope performs a leg drop on the opponent's neck, while the partner performs an extreme leg drop (double leg drop to the groin/lower-abdominal area) at the same time.

=== Double facebuster ===
This move sees two wrestlers performing two facebusters at the same time on a single opponent.

=== Double fireman's carry ===
Two wrestlers both lift a single opponent up into a fireman's carry leaving the two wrestlers back-to-back with the opponent across their shoulders is called a double fireman's carry. From here the two wrestlers can perform a double version of a fireman's carry slam, the wrestlers can also both fall backwards down to the mat dropping the opponent face-first into the canvas in a double flapjack type move.

=== Double flapjack ===
Two wrestlers throw a single opponent up into a flapjack. In this move both wrestlers push the opponent upward by reaching under their legs and lifting them into the air. While keeping the hold on the opponent’s legs the wrestlers fall backwards, dropping the opponent front-first into the canvas. Another basic double flapjack is similar to a back drop, in which the wrestlers push the opponent upwards and release them so that they fall onto their face instead of falling back-first.

=== Double headbutt ===
Two wrestlers grapple the opponent with one hand each, cock back and deliver headbutts to the opponent's skull. This move is used not too often and are more compatible for Super Heavyweights. The British Bulldogs used this maneuver as a signature move.

=== Double hip toss ===
When two wrestlers both hit a hip toss on a single opponent by both wrestlers underhooking the closest arm and then quickly lifting the opponent up and throwing them forward, flipping the opponent onto their back.

==== Catching hip toss ====
As two wrestlers hit the hip toss on a single opponent, both wrestlers catch the legs of the opponent as they flip over, so that both have a hold of one arm and leg of the opponent. From this position the wrestlers can lift the opponent up into the air and drop them onto the mat, or lift the opponent up and drop to a kneeling position so that the opponent drops onto their knees. This double team move is more common with lighter wrestlers or wrestlers with an old school style.

=== Double knee strike ===
The move sees two wrestlers deliver simultaneous knee strikes to the head of a kneeling opponent. Used by the Young Bucks, who call it the "BTE Trigger" or "EVP Trigger".

=== Double neckbreaker ===
The move sees two wrestlers standing side-by-side while holding the opponent neck back-to-back before falling backwards to force the opponent down the mat. This can also be used for the attackers shoulders and knees. It can also be performed by one wrestler on two opponents at the same time.

=== Double spear ===
A double spear sees two wrestlers both hit a spear on a single opponent. It can also be performed by one wrestler on two opponents at the same time.

=== Double submission ===
This term applies to any instance when attacking wrestlers lock an opponent in simultaneous submission holds.

=== Double STO ===
This move can either be a double STO when two wrestlers both hit a STO on a single opponent at the same time, or an aided STO (known in Japan as Oregatokare or "rage dragon slayer") where one wrestler help another wrestler to perform the STO, usually by sweeping out the legs from under the opponent. A reverse variation also exists.

=== Double superkick ===
A tandem attack where two wrestlers stand in front of an opponent and hit them in the face/head with a high side thrust kick, known as a superkick. The name can also refer to what is known as stereo superkicks, where two wrestlers both perform superkicks to two different opponents at the same time. This move is used by The Young Bucks and The Usos.

=== Double suplex ===
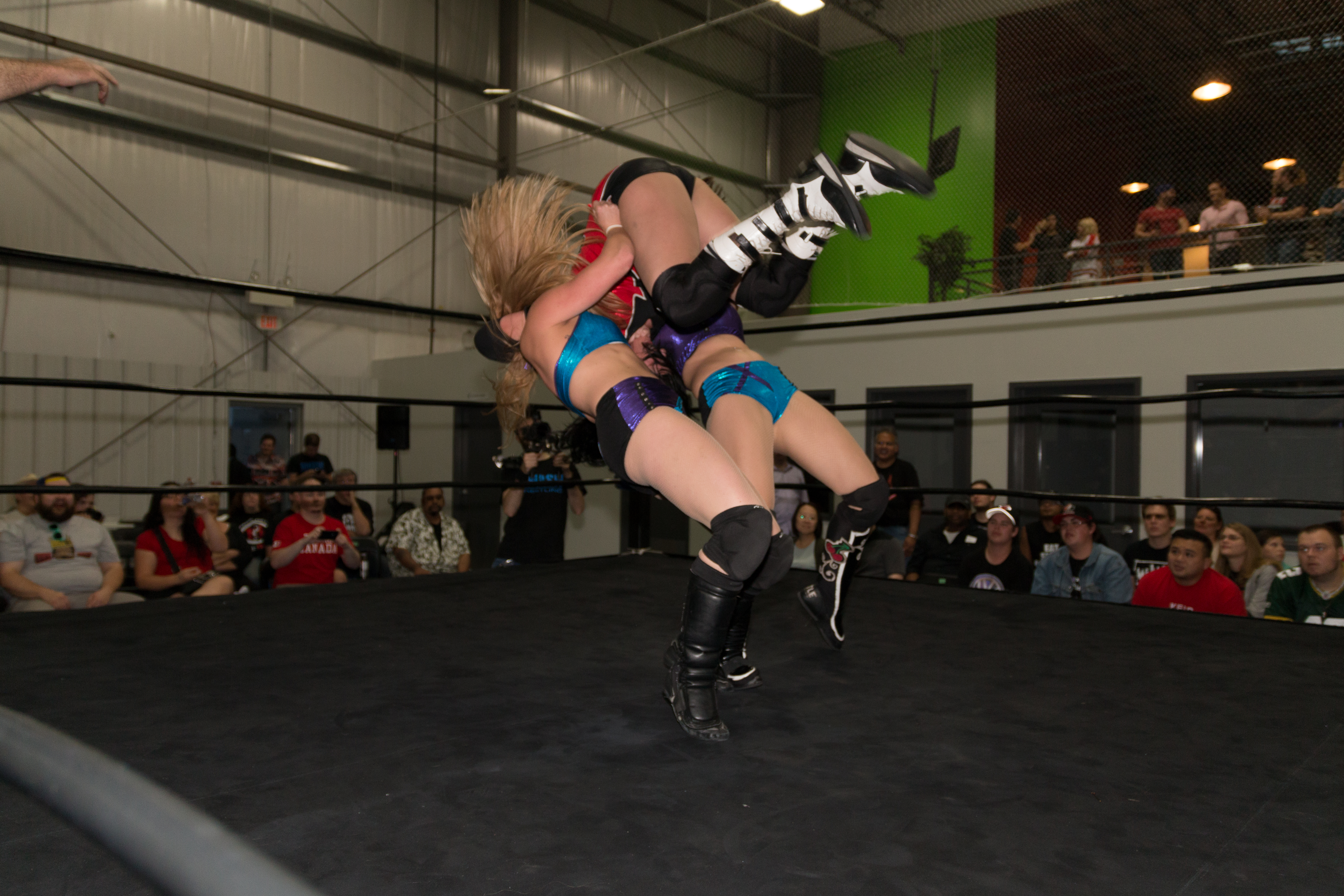
Kimber Lee and Cherry Bomb doing a double-suplex against Courtney Rush

A throw in which two wrestlers both suplex one opponent at the same time is called double suplex. The most common suplexes used for this double team move are the snap and vertical variations, in which the wrestlers apply a front face lock to the opponent, draping the opponent’s near arm over their respective shoulders. At this point the wrestlers will either pull their own legs back and kick them forward, quickly slamming them to the ground to build momentum to fall backwards and flip the opponent over them, so they all land on their backs for a double snap suplex. In a double vertical suplex, the move is the same except that when the opponent is in position, they are lifted and held upside-down before the wrestlers fall backwards. A double suplex can also refer to two suplexes being performed by one wrestler on two opponents at the same time, although this move is much rarer and typically requires a larger wrestler to suplex two smaller wrestlers, often as a counter to a standard double suplex.

==== Double belly-to-back suplex ====
The attackers stand behind the opponent on either side of them and put their heads under the opponent's arms. They then lift the opponent up using their arms wrapped around the torso, falling backwards and dropping the opponent flat on the mat and elevating the opponent so that they are lifted and held upside-down, before the attackers fall to their backs, driving the opponent down to the mat front-first, behind the attackers, as in a belly-to-back suplex. A slingshot variation is also possible.

=== Rolling double leg slam ===
The attacker wrestlers hooks a leg over the opponent's opposite leg to then roll in front, forcing the opponent hard back down to the mat. This technique was popularized in WWE by The Bella Twins. The move was innovated by Mikey Whipwreck and Tajiri in ECW.

=== Sky lift slam ===
This move sees the two attacking wrestlers standing either side of an opponent and hook their arms under the legs and arms of their side to elevate the opponent. From this position, the wrestlers then force the opponent upwards, throwing them up while releasing the hold to allow the opponent to fall and slam into the mat back-first. The stable The Spirit Squad has been known to use this move, with anywhere in their number of attackers ranging from 2 to 5 wrestlers lifting up and slamming the one opponent.

=== Spanish fly ===
This variation of the moonsault side slam is performed while all three performers are on the top turnbuckle. The wrestlers stand either side, slightly behind, and facing the front of a standing opponent, the wrestlers then reach under the near arms of the opponent, across the chest and under the opponent's far arm, while placing their other hands on the back of the opponent to hold them in place. The wrestlers then perform a moonsault driving the opponent into the ground back-first in a side slam position. It can also be performed by one wrestler on two opponents at the same time.

=== Wishbone ===
This move, a two-person variation of the leg snap and named after the tradition of pulling on a wishbone, sees two wrestlers each take hold of an opponent's leg (who is lying face up on the mat) and yank them in opposite directions, stretching out the groin area. This version is not to be confused with the submission hold of the same name.

== Pop-up, double knee facebreaker ==
This move begins with the two opponents rushing towards the attacker who then flings the opponent vertically up into the air. The move is finished by catching the opponent and performing a double knee facebreaker. This move was innovated and popularized by Kevin Owens and Chris Jericho. They called it the Pop-up "Codebreaker".

AEW tag team FTR uses a different version of this move which sees Harwood performing a flapjack against a charging opponent to elevate them to which Wheeler leaps upwards to catch the falling opponent into the double knee facebreaker. They use this as a finisher dubbed the Shatter Machine as FTR. The duo renamed the move to the "Goodnight Express", an homage to The Midnight Express, and they later renamed the move again to the "Big Rig" after the late Brodie Lee before returning to the “Shatter Machine” name in 2023.

== Russian legsweep, clothesline combination ==
One wrestler would begin a Russian legsweep as another wrestler hit the opponent with a clothesline, forcing the opponent hard back down to the mat. This move is popularized by The Authors of Pain as the "Last Chapter".

== Sidewalk slam, diving leg drop combination ==
One wrestler would perform a sidewalk slam, and then their partner would perform a diving leg drop on the prone or supine opponent. This move was popularized by the Smoking Gunns, naming it the Sidewinder. A slight variation of this sees the wrestler stay grounded instead of ascending to the top turnbuckle, performing a jumping legdrop on the opponent rather than a top rope one.

== Stack-superplex ==
A variation of the superplex (a vertical suplex off the top turnbuckle) in which the wrestler delivering the suplex sits upon the shoulders of another wrestler rather than standing on the ring ropes/turnbuckles where the opponent is situated. At the apex of the suplex, the lower wrestler falls backwards, increasing the power and momentum of the other wrestler's maneuver. A multi-person variation first sees an attacking wrestler climb the turnbuckles as if to perform a superplex on an opponent situated on the top turnbuckle, or in some case two wrestlers attempt a double superplex on the single opponent. However, at this point one or more wrestlers stand under the elevated wrestlers and hold them as if to perform a powerbomb, slamming them to the mat as they pull the other wrestler off the top. This has been famously referred to as the "Tower of Doom".

== STO, big boot combination ==
This move requires one person standing in front of the opponent, while the other runs towards the held opponent. The running wrestler will deliver a boot to the face, and the wrestler in front will then deliver an STO aided by the momentum of the kick.

== STO, Russian legsweep combination ==
This move requires one person standing behind the opponent, while one stands in front. The wrestler in front will deliver an STO, and the wrestler behind the opponent will perform a Russian legsweep on the same opponent. The reverse and forward versions of the moves can be used as well.

== STO, leg sweep combination ==
This move requires one person standing in front of the opponent, while the other stands to one side. The standing wrestler will deliver a spinning legsweep, and other the wrestler in front will then deliver an STO aided by the momentum of the sweep.

== Superkick-Plex ==
This combination move sees one wrestler perform a superkick on an opponent who is being held in a belly-to-back position by the second wrestler. The second wrestler uses the thrust of the superkick to aid in executing a bridging German suplex or any similar suplex for a pinfall attempt. This move is not to be confused with a superplex, which is a suplex from the top turnbuckle. This was the finisher of the WWF Tag Team The Orient Express.

== Wheelbarrow hold, diving leg drop combination ==
This move sees one wrestler wrap a forward-facing opponent's legs around their waist and apply a gutwrench hold to lift the opponent off the ground. At this point another wrestler, who is situated on the top turnbuckle, would then jump down to hit the opponent with a top-rope leg drop to the back of their exposed head, forcefully driving the opponent's face and body back down to the mat.

== Other unique double team moves ==
=== Battering ram ===
One wrestler stands behind their partner and leans forward, placing their head underneath the partner's arm in a headlock. The two then charge forward, ramming the head of the rear wrestler into the opponent. There is also a one-person version of the move used as a tag team finisher by The Bushwhackers.

=== Dropkick overdrive ===
One wrestler sets up an inverted overdrive (another version of a swinging neckbreaker), in which the attacking wrestler would use a knee rather than hands to perform the twist. In this move a wrestler would first place the knee closest to the bent-over opponent against the base of their neck while underhooking the opponent's far arm. The second wrestler dropkicks the opponent in the side of the head before the first wrestler falls backwards down to the mat. The opponent is spun over, landing the back of the head on the attacking wrestler's knee.

=== Scoop powerslam, powerbomb combination ===
One wrestler performs a scoop powerslam on an opponent, then the second wrestler puts the first one into a powerbomb, slamming them on the opponent.

=== Shaker Heights Spike ===
A unique double team innovated by the Beverly Brothers, this move sees Blake Beverly performing a pop-up against a charging opponent rebounding from the ropes from an irish whip. While the opponent is airborne Beau Beverly, standing off to the side from Blake, grabs the opponent's hair, if not their head, with both hands while they are horizontal and forces them downward with a kneeling facebuster. This move takes its name after the city of Shaker Heights, Ohio, where they were billed from at time during their run in the WWF. This move is extremely dangerous, as often the opponent(s) would fail to remain horizontal, pitching forwards causing them to land in a headspike (dropping themselves on top of their head) to the mat having no safe way to roll through or brace from the move even with Beau guiding them, causing numerous injuries in its wake. The most famous instance occurred on February 6, 1993, against wrestler Pete Christie often cited as a career-ending moment for him having suffered a severe concussion and neck injury. The brothers only used the move against jobbers as no one higher on the card in the WWF was willing to take the move. Instead, they took advantage of any and all jobbers who wanted TV time, pay, and wanting a possible spot with the WWF, all of which were unable to refuse to take the move.

=== Hiptoss, aided hiptoss combination ===
One wrestler performs a hiptoss on an opponent, then the wrestler's partner runs to the wrestler, where they perform a hiptoss on the partner on top of the opponent.

=== 4:20 double leg drop ===
Often associated with Rob Van Dam and Rey Mysterio. Rob would lift Rey and drop him while dropping himself into a seating position.

=== Meeting of the Minds ===
A subversion of the topic when a larger, heavier opponent knocks both of the attackers' heads into each other.

== See also ==
- Professional wrestling holds
- Professional wrestling throws
- Professional wrestling strikes
- Professional wrestling aerial techniques
