= Sanada =

Sanada is a Japanese surname. Notable people with the surname include:

- Asami Sanada (born 1977), Japanese voice actress
- Ayako Sanada (真田 彩子, born 1972), Japanese shogi player
- Juzo Sanada (1923–1994), Japanese baseball player
- Hiroki Sanada (born 1984), Japanese baseball player
- Hiroyuki Sanada (born 1960), Japanese actor
- Joichiro Sanada (1897–1957), Japanese general
- Keiichi Sanada, professional shogi player
- Masanori Sanada (1968–2011), Japanese football player
- Sanada (wrestler) (Seiya Sanada, born 1988), Japanese professional wrestler
- Takashi Sanada (born 1985), Japanese tennis player

== Sanada clan ==
- Sanada clan, Japanese clan from the 16th century
- Sanada Masayuki (1547–1611), Japanese lord
- Sanada Nobutsuna (1537–1575), Japanese samurai
- Sanada Nobuyuki (1566–1658), Japanese samurai
- Sanada Komatsu (1573–1620), wife of Sanada Nobuyuki
- Sanada Yukimura (1567–1615), Japanese samurai
- Sanada Chikurin-in (1579–1649), wife of Sanada Yukimura
- Sanada Yukinori (真田 幸教, 1836–1869), Japanese daimyō
- Sanada Yukitaka (1512–1574), Japanese samurai

== Fictional characters ==
- Akihiko Sanada, character in Persona 3 video game
- Kojiroh Sanada, character in The Last Blade video game
- Sheoke Sanada, Japanese supervillain in the Marvel Comics Universe
- Yukariko Sanada, minor character in My-HiME manga series
- Ryo Sanada, one of the main protagonists in Ronin Warriors

== See also ==
- Sanada, Nagano, a former town in Chiisagata District, Nagano Prefecture, Japan
- Sanada Ten Braves, group of ninja
