= Stunner (professional wrestling) =

Professional wrestling move

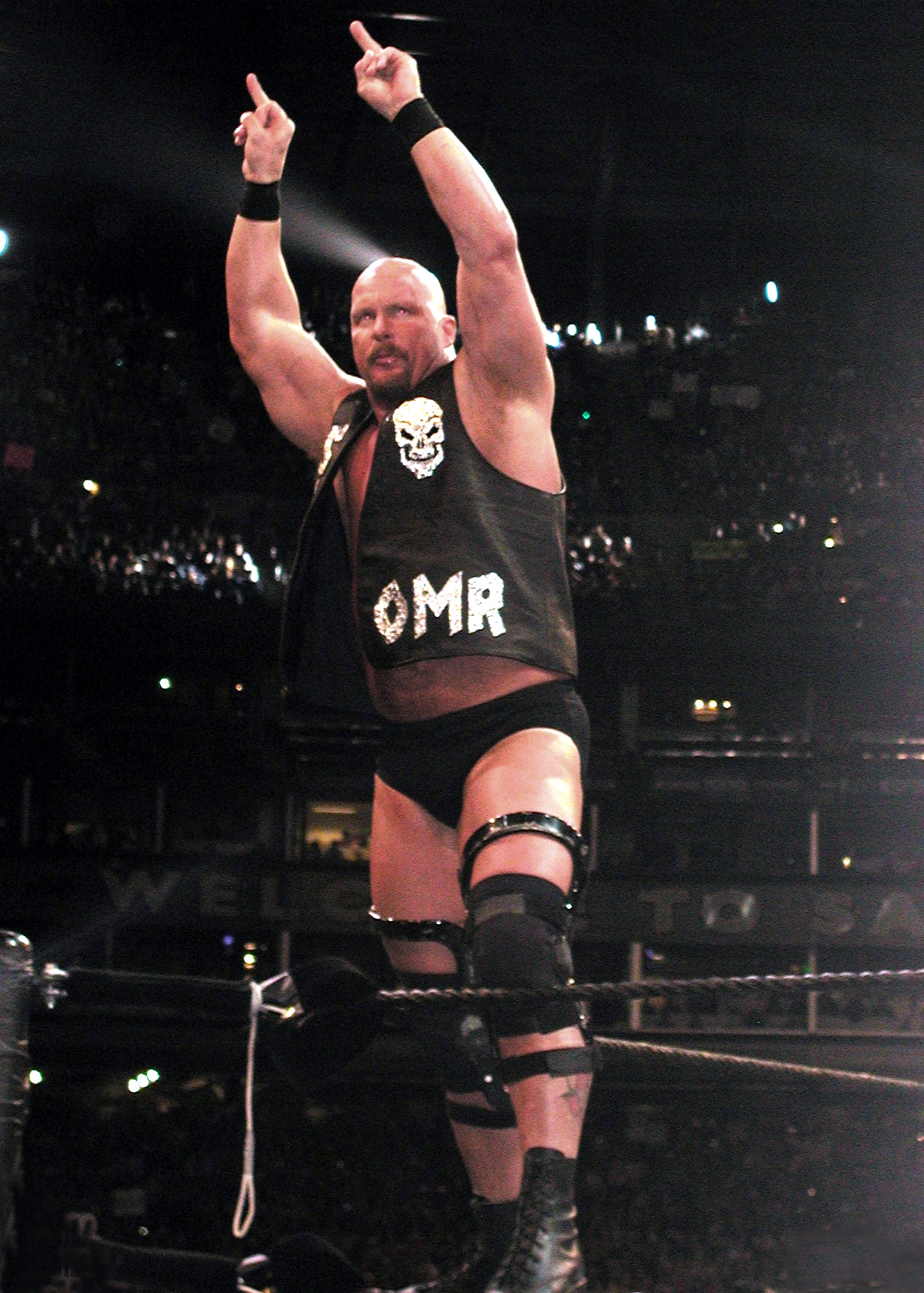
The stunner was made famous by Stone Cold Steve Austin

A stunner is a professional wrestling move, also a common term in professional wrestling referring to the ¾ facelock jawbreaker maneuver. The innovator of the move has been disputed, as both Mikey Whipwreck (who called it the Whippersnapper) and Michael P.S. Hayes (who called it the 9-1-1) have both claimed to be behind the origin of the move. The move was named for Stone Cold Steve Austin's Stone Cold Stunner finisher, a finisher suggested to him by Hayes. It involves an attacking wrestler applying a three-quarter facelock (reaching back and grabbing the head of an opponent, thus pulling the opponent's jaw above the wrestler's shoulder) before falling to a seated position and forcing the opponent's jaw (but predominantly the opponent's neck) to drop down on the shoulder of the attacking wrestler. The free hand is sometimes used to hold the top of the head.

== Types ==
=== Backpack stunner ===
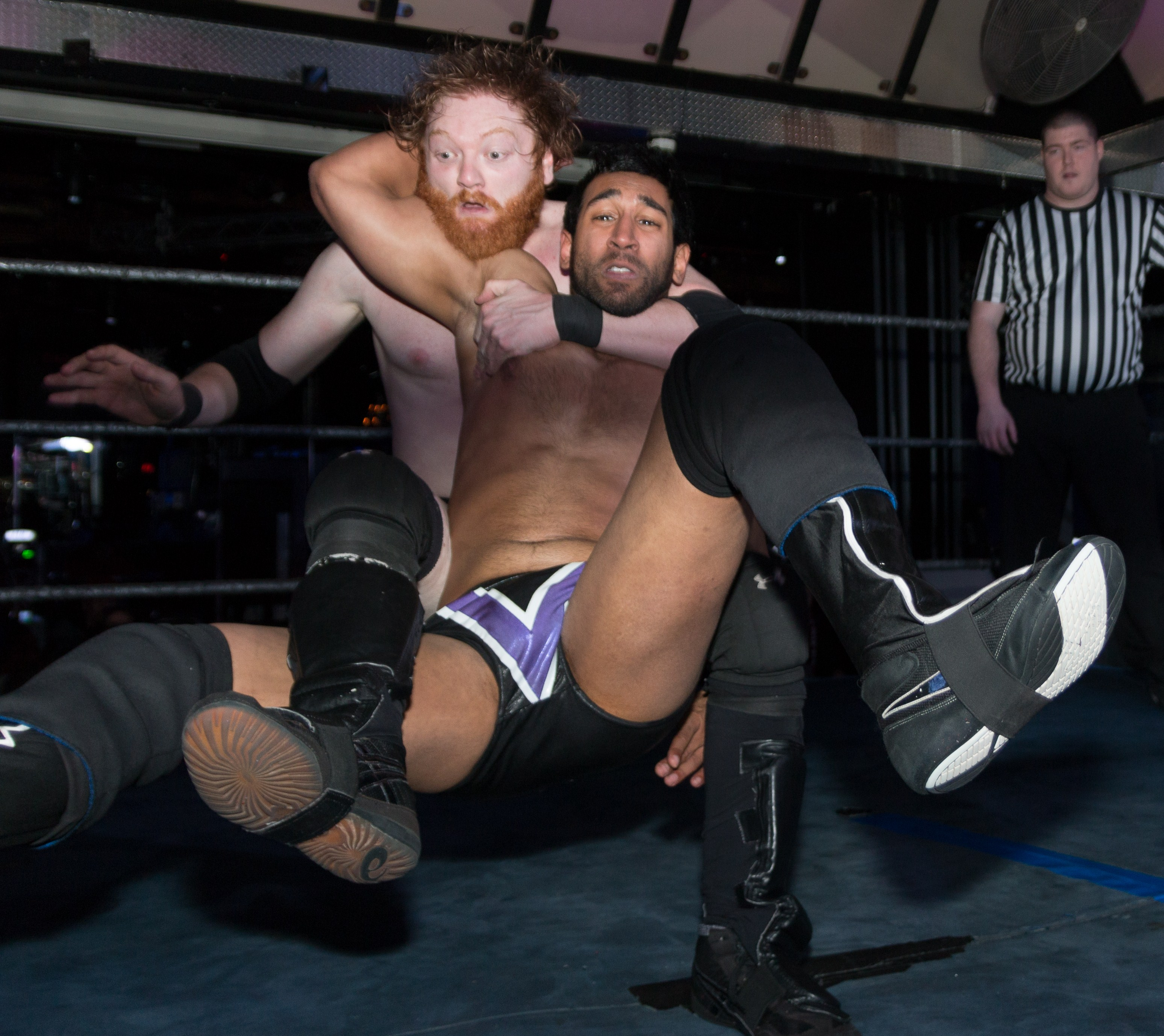
Alex Vega performing a backpack stunner on Josh Rogen

Also known as a piggyback stunner, in this elevated stunner variation, the opponent is first raised up in a piggy-back position. From here, the attacking wrestler applies a three-quarter facelock and drops down to a seated position while still holding the opponent's head to force them to fall into the stunner. Used by Ryback and Eddie Edwards.

=== Diving corkscrew stunner ===
Athena's version of the stunner is called the O-Face. It is when the wrestler launches themselves off the top rope and does a corkscrew rotation. After completing the corkscrew, whilst still in mid-air the attacking wrestler applies a three-quarter facelock to the opponent whilst falling down to a seated position to complete the stunner.

=== Elevated stunner ===
With an opponent placed on an elevated surface, a wrestler applies a three-quarter facelock and then draws the opponent away, leaving only the opponent's feet over the elevated surface. The wrestler then falls to a seated position so that the opponent is forced to dive forward across the shoulder of the attacking wrestler. This is believed to have more impact due to the angle of which the opponent is dropped

=== Fireman's carry stunner ===
Also known as the Total Knock Out or TKO for short, this is an elevated stunner variation in which the opponent is first raised over the shoulders of a wrestler in the fireman's carry position. From here, the attacking wrestler throws the legs of the opponent out backwards and drops down to the mat while taking hold of the opponent's head to force them to fall into the stunner. The name originally referred to the cutter variation. The name has since been used to refer to both types.

=== Forward somersault stunner ===
A standing variation of the Diamond Dust in which the attacking wrestler first holds an opponent in an inverted facelock before then jumping forwards to somersault over the opponent, landing in a seated position with the opponent's head driven into the wrestler's shoulder. Charlotte Flair uses this move, dubbing it the Natural Selection.

=== Front facelock stunner ===
In this variation, the wrestler first applies a front facelock, before pivoting 180 degrees to bring themselves into the three-quarter facelock position and dropping down to a sitting position, forcing the opponent's jaw to drop down on the shoulder of the attacking wrestler. Jeff and Rebecca Hardy use the variant, also called the Twist of Fate, along with the better known cutter variation.

=== Inverted suplex stunner ===
This variation sees the wrestler apply an inverted facelock on an opponent before hooking their tights and lifting them straight up in the air so that they are upside down. The wrestler then lets the opponent's body fall backwards over their shoulder as in an inverted suplex, and when the opponent's feet lands on the mat, the wrestler drops to a seated position to force the opponent's jaw to drop down on the shoulder of the attacking wrestler. Innovated by Super Delfin.

=== Jumping stunner ===
Similar in execution to a jumping cutter, this version sees an attacking wrestler crouch in front of the opponent, then jump up and grab the opponent in a three-quarter facelock and drop down into a stunner.

=== Rolling stunner ===
This version sees an attacking wrestler first place an opponent (who is in front of them) in an inverted facelock before rolling themselves under the opponent, turning both wrestlers over so that the opponent can be dropped into the stunner. Frankie Kazarian uses this move as a finisher, calling it "Ace of Spades". Grayson Waller also uses this as his finishing move.

=== Running stunner ===
Similar in execution to a running cutter, the running stunner is where the attacking wrestler runs to an opponent who is distracted and grab the opponent in a three-quarter facelock and drop down into a stunner. Briefly used by Dustin Rhodes in 2007.

=== Springboard stunner ===
This variation sees the attacking wrestler jump onto the ropes, followed by the wrestler springboarding off the ropes rebounding back into the opponent and hitting the stunner. The move has been used by John Cena. There is also a corkscrew variation that is used as a finisher by Flip Gordon, calling it the Star-Spangled Stunner. Lio Rush uses a seated springboard version off the bottom rope, running to gain momentum for a shorter wrestler like him.

=== Stone Cold stunner ===
The Stone Cold stunner, as popularized and stated by Steve Austin, always involves a boot to the gut before the three-quarter facelock is applied. Kevin Owens has also used this variation as a finisher.

=== Suplex counter stunner ===
Also known as a Falling stunner, this move is used as a counter to the vertical suplex. The variant starts off with the attacking wrestler being lifted up in a vertical suplex. Once the wrestler is lifted off of their feet, the attacking wrestler shifts their body around and applies the three-quarter facelock before dropping down to complete the stunner. Popularized by Will Ospreay and Orange Cassidy as the Stun-Dog Millionaire.

=== Tilt-a-whirl stunner ===
Often used as a counter to the tilt-a-whirl backbreaker, this variant sees the attacking wrestler in the Tilt-a-whirl position, but instead of being lifted and slammed onto a knee or into the mat, the attacker reaches back and applies a three-quarter facelock before falling to a seated position, with the opponent's jaw impacting with the shoulder of the wrestler. British independent wrestler Lana Austin uses this move as a finisher, calling it Kiss of Death. Other variation sees the attacker tilt-a-whirl their opponent and then dropping them in the stunner.

=== Vertical suplex stunner ===
This elevated stunner first sees the attacking wrestler apply a front facelock, hook the opponent's near arm over their shoulder and lift them as for a standard vertical suplex. However, in mid-move, the attacking wrestler forces the opponent to turn 180 degrees and then apply the three-quarter facelock, forcing the opponent to drop down with their jaw across the attacking wrestler's shoulder as they fall to a seated position to hit the stunner. Innovated and popularized by Masato Tanaka as the Shotgun Stunner. R-Truth uses this move too; he calls it the Truth or Consequences.

=== Wheelbarrow stunner ===
Often used as a counter to the wheelbarrow facebuster, this variant sees the attacking wrestler in the wheelbarrow position, but instead of being lifted and slammed into the mat, the attacker reaches back and applies a three-quarter facelock before falling to a seated position, with the opponent's jaw impacting with the shoulder of the wrestler.

== See also ==
- Professional wrestling throws
