= Keiichi Sanada =

Japanese shogi player

- Native name: 真田圭一
- Born: October 6, 1972 (age 53)
- Hometown: Yachiyo, Chiba
- Nationality: Japanese

Career
- Achieved professional status: April 1, 1992 (aged 19)
- Badge Number: 202
- Rank: 8-dan
- Teacher: Shigeyuki Matsuda (9-dan)
- Meijin class: C2
- Ryūō class: 5

Websites
- JSA profile page

Keiichi Sanada (真田 圭一, Sanada Keiichi; born October 6, 1972) is a Japanese professional shogi player ranked 8-dan. He is a former director of the Japan Shogi Association.

== Early life and apprenticeship ==
Sanada was born on October 6, 1972, in Yachiyo, Chiba. In 1985, he entered the Japan Shogi Association's apprentice school when he was twelve years old at the rank of 6-kyū as a student of shogi professional Shigeyuki Matsuda. He was promoted to the rank of 1-dan in 1988, and obtained full professional status and the rank of 4-dan in April 1992.

=== Promotion history ===
Sanada's promotion history is as follows:

- 6-kyū: 1985
- 1-dan: 1988
- 4-dan: April 1, 1992
- 5-dan: April 1, 1994
- 6-dan: October 1, 1997
- 7-dan: March 1, 2005
- 8-dan: October 25, 2016

=== Titles and other championships ===
Sanada's only appearance in a major title match came in 1997 when he was the challenger for the 10th Ryūō title.

=== Awards and honors ===
Sanada received the Japan Shogi Association Annual Shogi Award for "Best New Player" in 1997.

== JSA director ==
Sanada served on the Japan Shogi Association's board of directors from 1999 until 2003. He was elected for his first two-year term as a director at the association's 50th General Meeting in May 1999, and then re-elected to a second two-year term at the association's 52nd General Meeting in May 2001.

== Personal life ==
Sanada's wife Ayako is a retired female shogi professional.
