= Ayako Sanada =

Japanese shogi player (born 1972)

- Native name: 真田彩子
- Maiden name: Furukawa (古河)
- Born: August 13, 1972 (age 52)
- Hometown: Iwaki, Fukushima

Career
- Achieved professional status: March 1, 1991 (aged 18)
- Badge Number: W-12
- Rank: Women's 3-dan
- Retired: March 31, 2020 (aged 47)
- Teacher: Yūji Sase (Honorary 9-dan)

Websites
- JSA profile page

Ayako Sanada (真田 彩子 Sanada Ayako, née Furukawa Ayako 古河 彩子, born August 13, 1972) is a Japanese retired women's professional shogi player who achieved the rank of 3-dan.

== Women's shogi professional ==
=== Promotion history ===
Sanada's promotion history is as follows.

- 1991, March 1: 2-kyū
- 1992, April 1: 1-kyū
- 1997, May 29: 1-dan
- 2003, April 9: 2-dan
- 2020, March 31: Retired
- 2021, April 1: 3-dan

Note: All ranks are women's professional ranks.

== Personal life ==
Sanada's husband Keiichi is also a professional shogi player.
