= Backbreaker =

Professional wrestling move

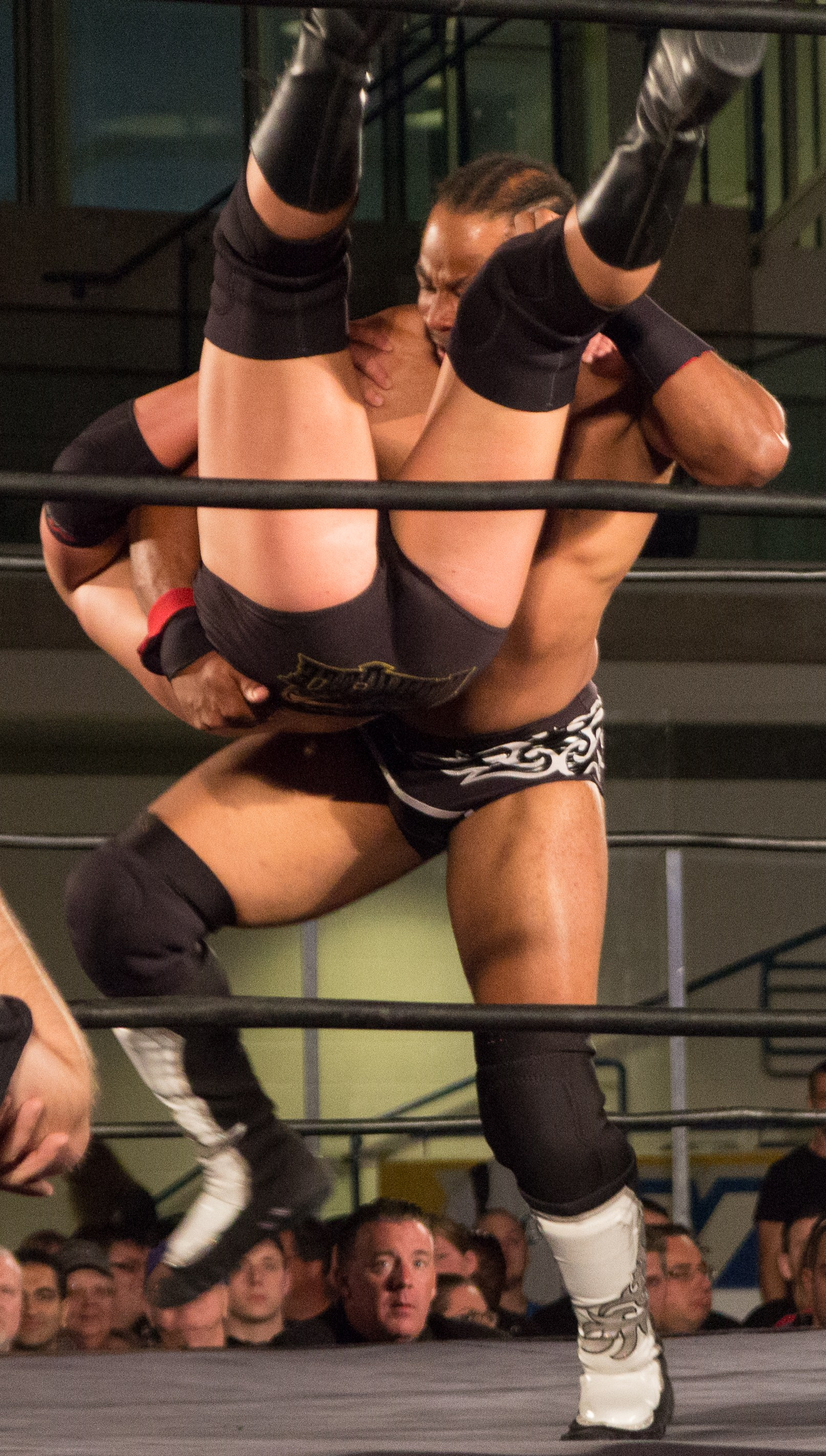
Jay Lethal performs a standard pendulum backbreaker.

Backbreaker refers to a kind of professional wrestling move which sees a wrestler dropping an opponent so that the opponent's back impacts or is bent backwards against a part of the wrestler's body, usually the knee. The standard version of the move sees the wrestler scoop their opponent horizontally before dropping to one knee, slamming the opponent's back on their other knee.

== Variations ==
=== Argentine backbreaker rack ===
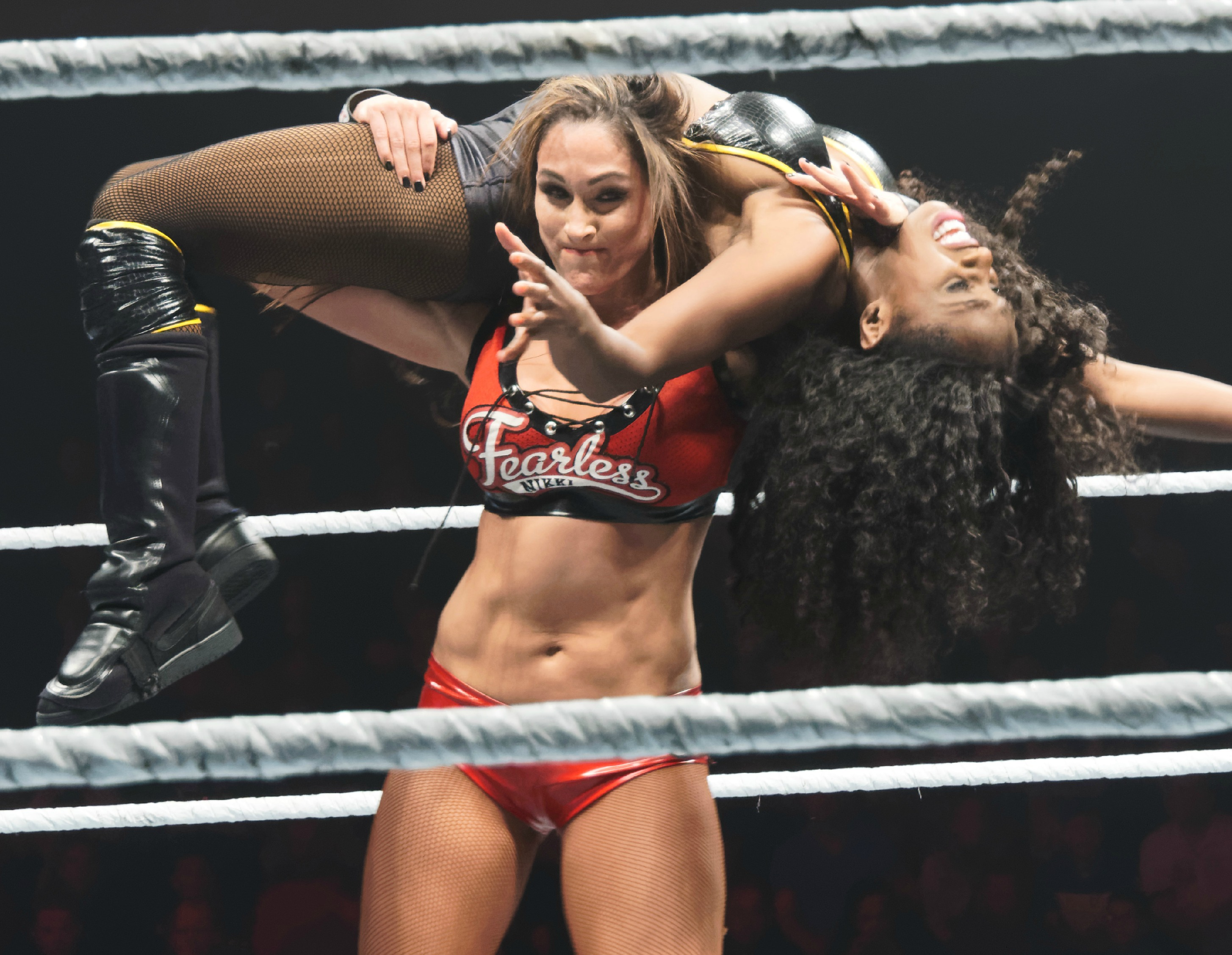
Nikki Bella setting up to perform the Rack Attack (Argentine backbreaker drop) on Naomi.

This submission hold, better known as a Torture Rack or simply a rack, sees the attacking wrestler carrying the opponent face-up across his own shoulders, before hooking the opponent's head with one hand and a leg with the other to then pull down on both ends to hyperextend the opponent's back and force a submission. Wrestler Lex Luger was famous for using it as a finisher. Former WWF Superstar Hercules even used this move as a finisher, along with a Full Nelson Submission Hold.

A backbreaker drop variation of this submission move sees the attacking wrestler first hold an opponent up for the Argentine backbreaker rack before dropping to the mat in a sitting or kneeling position, thus flexing the opponent's back with the impact of the drop. Another version sees the wrestler hold their opponent in the Argentine backbreaker rack before dropping into a sitting or kneeling position while simultaneously throwing the opponent off their shoulders, causing the opponent to roll in midair and fall to the mat in a face-down position. Nikki Bella has used both variations as a finisher in WWE.

A variation of the Argentine backbreaker rack, known as the La Reinera, sees the opponent held across the wrestler's upper back rather than his shoulders/neck. Often set up by a tilt-a-whirl, the opponent ends up suspended with one arm hooked behind and both legs hooked by the wrestler's other arm. Rolando Vera was credited with inventing the move.

Another Argentine backbreaker rack variation called the La Atlántida, favored by Mexican luchador Atlantis, sees the attacking wrestler holding the opponent across the shoulders and behind the head in a side-lying position facing towards the rear, then pulling down on the head and one leg to laterally bending the opponent.

A variation of the La Atlántida, sometimes known as the "Accordion Rack", sees the opponent held similarly in a side-lying position facing the rear across the attacking wrestler's shoulders, but with the opponent's lower back curvature directly behind the wrestler's head, and instead of pulling downwards the wrestler will chest fly forward to bend the opponent, sometimes to the point that the opponent's heel touches the head. However, this move is mainly limited to opponents with great flexibility. It was utilized by wrestlers like Awesome Kong.

=== Backbreaker drop ===
A backbreaker move in which the wrestler lifts an opponent up into an Argentine backbreaker or an overhead gutwrench backbreaker rack, so the opponent's back is resting on the wrestler's shoulder, with the opponent's head pointing in the direction that the wrestler is facing. The attacking wrestler then drops to a kneeling or sitting position while maintaining the hold, thus jarring the back of the opponent by driving the opponent's spine into the attacking wrestler's shoulder. TNA wrestler Abyss used the Argentine version called the Shock Treatment.

=== Belly-to-back backbreaker ===
The wrestler stands behind the opponent and puts their head under the opponent's arm, as in a belly-to-back suplex, but raises a knee and brings the opponent back down, so that the opponent's back collides with the knee of the wrestler. The move was popularized by Billy Robinson. Tatsumi Fujinami calls this the Dragon Backbreaker. Cedric Alexander uses a double knee version called the Lumbar Check.

=== Canadian backbreaker rack ===
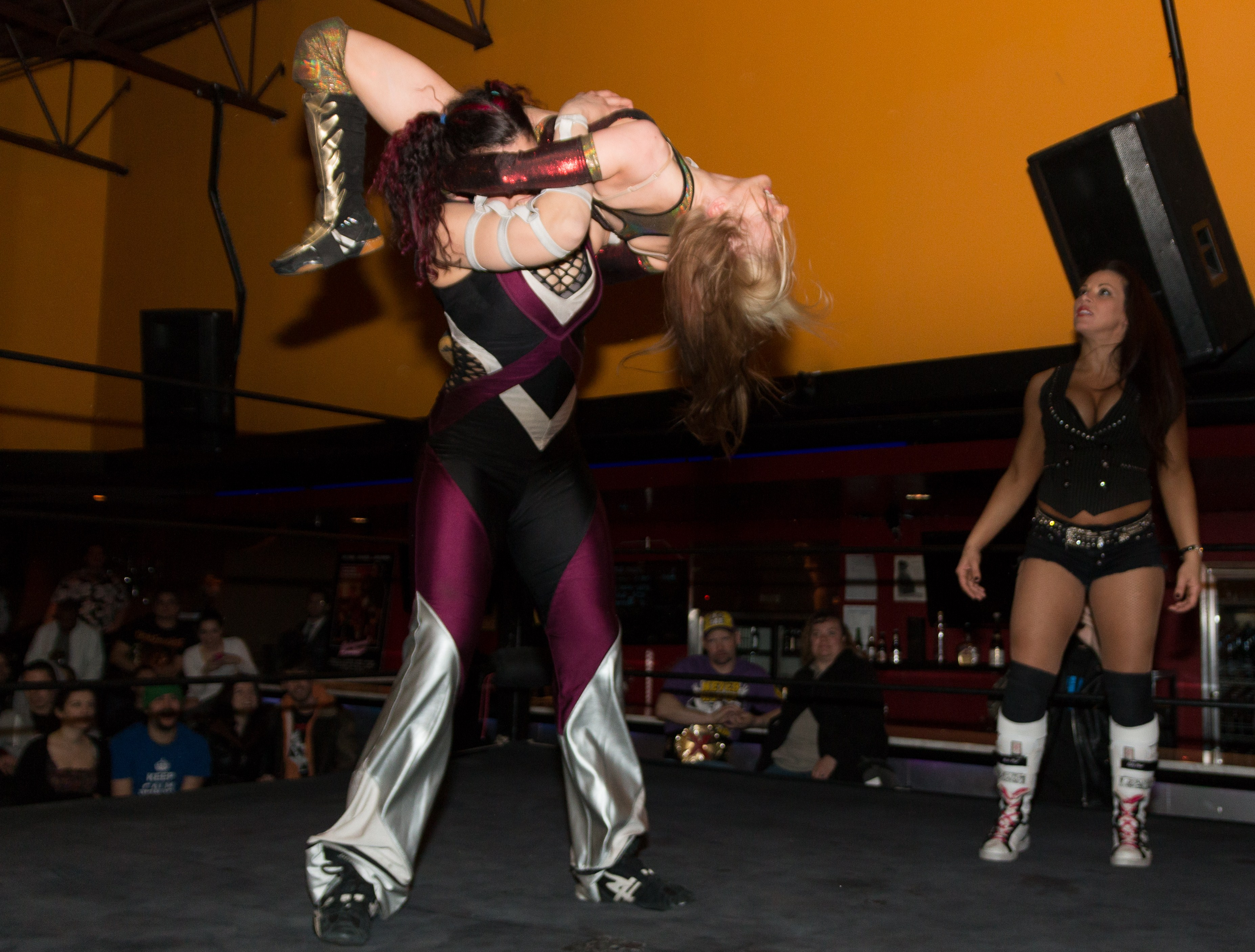
Vanessa Kraven holds Xandra Bale in the air with a Canadian backbreaker rack.

Also known technically as the overhead gutwrench backbreaker rack, this sees an attacking wrestler first lift an opponent up so the opponent's back is resting on the wrestler's shoulder, with the opponent's head pointing in the direction that the wrestler is facing. The wrestler then links their arms around the face-up opponent's torso and presses down, squeezing the opponent's spine against the wrestler's shoulder. Hulk Hogan used this move as a finisher early into his WWF career. A common variant of this hold has the attacking wrestler also apply a double underhook before or after lifting the opponent. This was used by Colt Cabana as the Colt .45. The double underhook variant is often seen when the hold is used to transition to another maneuver, such as a backbreaker drop or inverted powerbomb. Bruno Sammartino famously used this move on his opponents.

=== Catapult backbreaker ===
The catapult throw typically starts with the attacking wrestler standing and facing the opponent, who is lying on their back. The wrestler hooks each of the opponent's legs in one of their arms then falls backwards to slingshot the opponent into a turnbuckles, ladders, ropes, etc. At this point the attacking wrestler will remain on the ground and raise their knees while still holding the opponent's legs. The rebounding opponent will instantly trip, falling backwards onto the raised knees of the wrestler. In another method, the wrestler performs a catapult and raises the knees prematurely so that the opponent is draped over the knees without an actual launch.

=== Chokeslam backbreaker ===
The wrestler performing the move stands in front of and slightly to the side of the opponent receiving it. The wrestler then reaches out and grabs the opponent's throat and trunks, and lifts them in the air as though the wrestler is about to deliver a chokeslam. However, as the wrestler brings the opponent back down to the mat, the wrestler kneels, slamming the opponent's back onto their extended knee. This move is popularly known as a chokebreaker, which is a portmanteau of this move's technical name. Baron Corbin uses this move calling it the Blood Moon.

=== Cobra clutch backbreaker ===
This move involves an attacking wrestler first putting an opponent in a cobra clutch hold before lifting the opponent up while maintaining the hold (turning them in mid-air so they are horizontal) and bringing them down while the wrestler drops to a knee, so that the opponent impacts back-first on the knee of the attacking wrestler, all while the wrestler maintains the hold. The attacking wrestler can continue the hold after impact for a cobra clutch submission attempt. It was used by Big Show as finishing move on rare occasions.

=== Double knee backbreaker ===
Also known as a lung blower, this technique involves an attacking wrestler going behind an opponent and putting both of their hands around the opponent's head for a rear chin lock or on both of the opponent's shoulders while jumping up to place both knees against the opponent's back. Both wrestlers then fall backward to the ground, forcing the wrestler's knees to push up into the back of the opponent. This move can be done from a variety of transition holds, including a powerbomb transition and a vertical suplex transition. First popularised by Carlito as the Backstabber, his brother Primo and cousin Epico would also use that move under the same name. Sasha Banks uses this move before delivering her Banks Statement submission move. Roderick Strong uses a vertical suplex transition version called the End of Heartache. Tommaso Ciampa uses a powerbomb transition called Project Ciampa. Liv Morgan has used this move since 2022.

=== Somersault double knee backbreaker ===
This move sees the attacker running to a opponent whose hunched over facing them. The attacker then jumps up and in the process grabs onto the stomach of the opponent which forces the opponents back onto the knees of the attacker. Dakota Kai uses this as her finisher and calls it the Kairopractor.

=== Double foot backbreaker ===
Liv Morgan invented this variation of backbreaker in 2021. She performs it by standing behind her opponent by holding both her wrists and forcing both her feet on her opponent's back pushing her, mostly face-first on the top turnbuckle. Liv is the only user of this backbreaker variation till now.

=== Double underhook backbreaker ===
Made famous by Tiger Mask as the Tiger Bomb. An attacking wrestler stands facing a bent over opponent and hooks each of the opponent's arms behind the opponent's back, then lifts the opponent as if executing a Tiger Bomb. However, as the attacker drops the opponent back down, they raise a knee and bring the opponent back down horizontally, so their back collides with the knee of the attacking wrestler. CM Punk used this move, calling it the Welcome to Chicago Motherfucker. Io Shirai also uses this move.

=== Fireman's carry backbreaker ===
The attacker lifts the opponent on their shoulders in a fireman's carry, then flips them over so their back lands on the top of their knee. A variation to this move is performed similar to how an Ushigoroshi is performed instead by driving a knee into the upper back.

=== Full nelson backbreaker ===
The attacking wrestler stands behind the opponent and locks them in a full nelson before lifting the opponent, as if to perform a full nelson slam, but as the wrestler drops down the opponent, they slam the opponent back-first against their exposed knee.

=== Half nelson backbreaker ===
The attacking wrestler stands behind the opponent and locks in a half nelson before lifting the opponent, as if to perform a half nelson slam, but as the wrestler brings the opponent down to the mat, they drop to one knee, slamming the opponent's back across their extended knee.

=== Hair-pull backbreaker (Head-pull backbreaker) ===
This move is performed behind the opponent. The wrestler grabs the opponent by the hair (or by the head if the opponent is bald or if the attacking wrestler is a clean performer) and pulls them back, so the opponent's back lands on the wrestler's knee. In a variation of this move, the wrestler faces the opponent, grabs them by the hair, twists around so the wrestler and opponent are back to back, and then the wrestler pulls the opponent's hair down, driving their back into the wrestler's knee. Katie Lea Burchill used both variations as her finisher. Michelle McCool used this move as a finisher called Final Exam. Alexa Bliss also uses this move.

=== Spinning inverted facelock lariat backbreaker ===
Goto performing the GTR on Tetsuya Bushi

First the wrestler holds the opponent in an inverted facelock and then the wrestler spins around and delivers a lariat onto their knee. This was invented by Hirooki Goto as the GTR (Go To Revolution).

=== Spinning inverted facelock lariat double knee backbreaker ===
Similar to the spinning inverted facelock lariat backbreaker, this move starts with an inverted facelock then sees the attacker fall onto their back while performing a lariat so the opponent is pushed onto the attackers knees.

This move was popularized by Angelina Love who used it as her finisher in Impact Wrestling and called it break a bitch.

=== Inverted headlock backbreaker ===
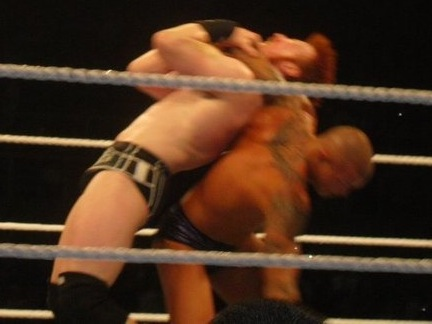
Randy Orton performing an inverted headlock backbreaker on Sheamus at a WWE house show.

Used by Randy Orton. This move sees the attacking wrestler stand behind the opponent and place one arm around the opponent's neck. The attacker then turns 180° so they are back to back and bends forward, pulling the opponent across their own back, before dropping down to their knees and jarring the opponent's back.

=== Inverted three-quarter facelock backbreaker ===
Can be also known as an inverted three-quarter facelock neckbreaker, or more commonly known as neckbreaker (slam) backbreaker. The wrestler stands beside the opponent facing either side, catches the opponent's neck from behind with both hands (as seen primarily before falling into a neckbreaker slam), and then forces the opponent's neck down, simultaneously extending a knee so they lands the opponent's back into the knee.

=== Mat backbreaker ===
The attacking wrestler stands behind an opponent, grabbing them by their head or hair to seemingly perform a standard mat slam. However, as the wrestler pulls the opponent backwards down to the mat, the wrestler kneels down, driving the opponent's back into the wrestler's exposed knee. If the wrestler uses the opponent's hair to pull them back onto the wrestler's exposed knee it is known as a hair pull backbreaker.

=== Pendulum backbreaker ===
This basic backbreaker involves a wrestler standing side-to-side and slightly behind the opponent, with the opponent facing in the same direction, then reaching around the opponent's torso with one arm across the opponent's chest and under both arms and placing the other arm under the opponent's legs, as if they were performing a sidewalk slam. The wrestler then lifts the opponent up, bringing their legs off the ground, and dropping them back-first against the wrestler's knee. The pendulum backbreaker can also be done by spinning around and then dropping the opponent onto the knee. The move was most famously used by Harley Race and Bret Hart, the latter of which used it as one of his "Five Moves of Doom".

==== Backbreaker submission ====
This basic backbreaker submission involves the wrestler laying the opponent's back across one knee, then, while placing one hand on the opponent's chin and the other on their knee, the wrestler pushes down to bend the opponent around their knee. This move is usually performed at the end of a pendulum backbreaker, a move which sees a wrestler drop an opponent down on the wrestler's knee, thus weakening the back before the hold is applied, as well as setting the opponent in a proper position. An Argentine backbreaker rack variation of the move is used by Ezekiel Jackson known as the Torture Rack and Gunner during his TNA tenure known as the Gunner Rack.

=== Russian legsweep backbreaker ===
This backbreaker variation sees the wrestler standing beside the opponent, slightly behind them. Then, the wrestler wraps one arm around the opponent's back/neck, catches the opponent's neck, and forces the opponent down in a Russian legsweep style and simultaneously extends a knee. The maneuver results in the opponent's neck or back being slammed against the wrestler's knee.

=== Side slam backbreaker ===
The wrestler first stands side-to-side and slightly behind the opponent, facing in the opposite direction, before reaching around the opponent's torso with one arm across the opponent's chest and under both arms, lifting them in the air as though the wrestler is about to deliver a side slam. However, as the wrestler brings the opponent back down to the mat, the attacking wrestler kneels, slamming the opponent's back across their extended knee. This type of variation is used by Sheamus, who dubbed it the Irish Curse.

A swinging side slam variation sees the attacking wrestler first scoop the opponent horizontally across their chest before swinging them to their side and dropping the opponent back first on their knee.

=== STO backbreaker ===
The attacking wrestler stands facing the opponent, then puts one of their arms across the opponent's chest holding their shoulder. The attacking wrestler then sweeps the legs of the opponent in the fashion of an STO, but brings their knee forward so the opponent falls back-first onto it. There is also an arm trap version that sees an attacking wrestler take hold of one of the opponent's arms and then move to a slightly front to back position, so that the opponent's arm hooks across and round the opponent's own head. At this point, the attacking wrestler kneels forward to the ground, forcing the opponent's own arm to drag them to the attacker's exposed knee.

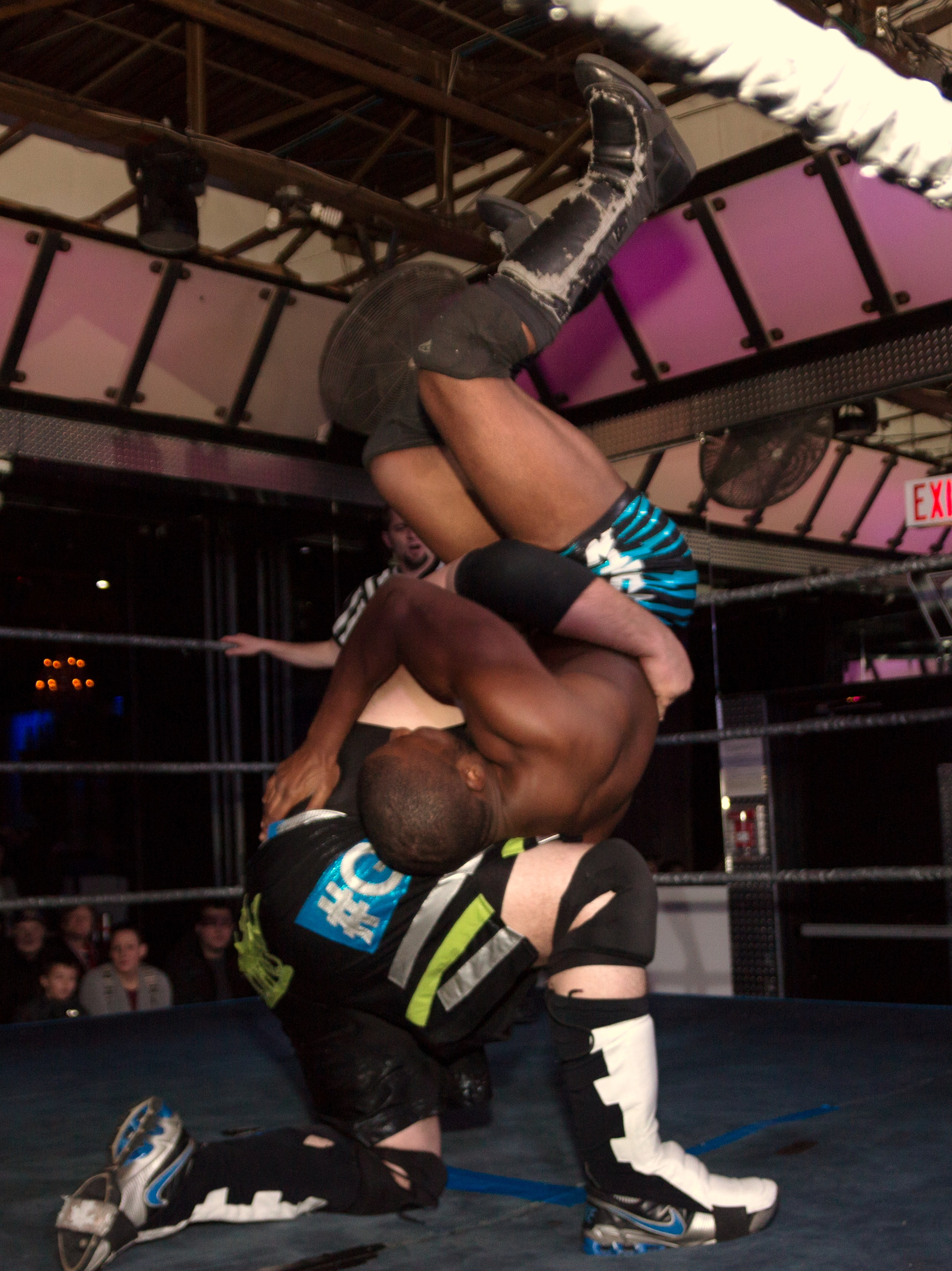
Joey Kings does a tilt-a-whirl backbreaker on Justin Sane.

=== Tilt-a-whirl backbreaker ===
The attacking wrestler stands facing the opponent, who is often charging at the attacker, before bending the opponent down so they are bent in front of the attacking wrestler as they stands over them. Then the wrestler reaches around the opponent's body and lifts them up, spinning the opponent in front of the wrestler's body. As the wrestler brings the opponent back down to the mat, the wrestler kneels, slamming the opponent's back across the extended knee. In Lucha libre, it is known as the Quebradora Con Giro.

== See also ==
- Professional wrestling holds
- Professional wrestling throws
