= Takeminakata =

Japanese god of wind, water, hunting and agriculture

- God of the wind, water, hunting and warfare
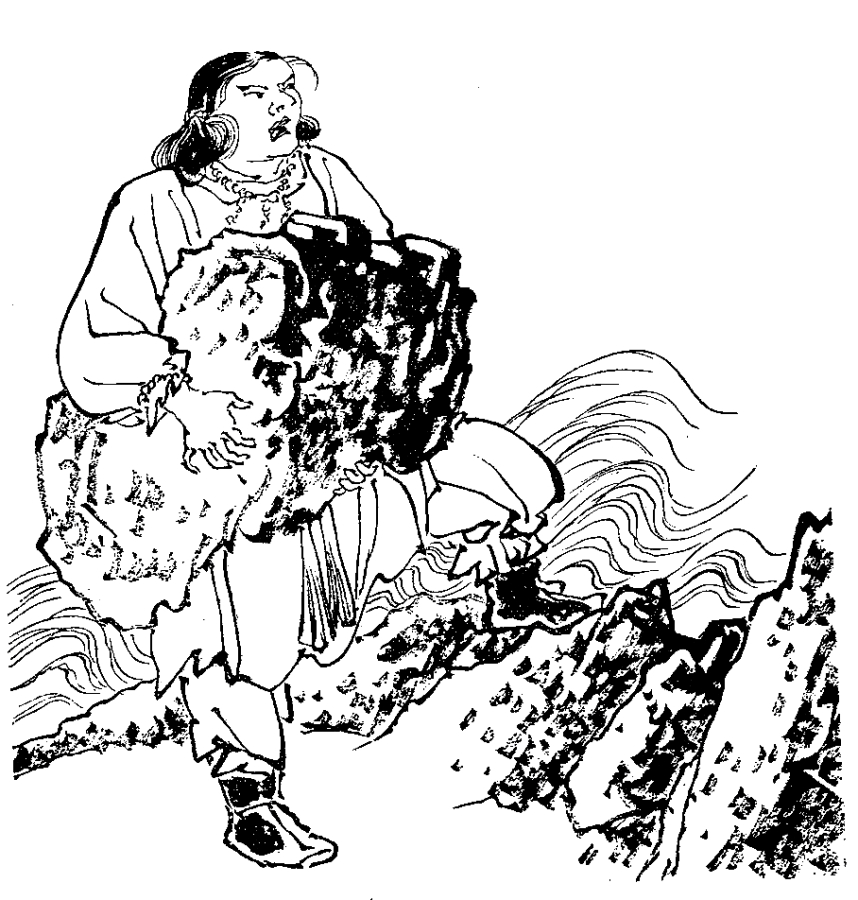
- Takeminakata carrying a heavy rock (chibiki no iwa) with his fingertips as a display of strength
- Other names: Takeminakata-no-Mikoto (建御名方命, 健御名方命) Minakatatomi-no-Kami (南方刀美神); Minakatatomi-no-Mikoto (御名方富命); Takeminakatatomi-no-Mikoto (建御名方富命, 健御名方富命); Suwa Myōjin (諏訪明神, 諏方明神); Suwa Daimyōjin (諏訪大明神, 諏方大明神); Suwa Hosshō Daimyōjin (諏訪法性大明神, 諏方法性大明神); Suwa Nangū Hosshō Kamishimo Daimyōjin (諏訪南宮法性上下大明神, 諏方南宮法性上下大明神); Suwa Shōichii Nangū Hosshō Daimyōjin (諏訪正一位南宮法性大明神, 諏方正一位南宮法性大明神); Suwa-no-Ōkami (諏訪大神); Suwa-no-Kami (諏訪神) O-Suwa-sama (お諏訪様 / お諏訪さま)
- Japanese: 建御名方神
- Major cult center: Suwa Grand Shrine
- Symbols: snake, dragon
- Texts: Kojiki, Sendai Kuji Hongi, Suwa Daimyōjin Ekotoba

Genealogy
- Parents: Ōkuninushi and Nunakawahime
- Siblings: Kotoshironushi and others
- Consort: Yasakatome
- Children: Izuhayao, Katakurabe and others

Takeminakata (タケミナカタ), also known as Minakatatomi or Takeminakatatomi, is a kami in Japanese mythology. Also known as Suwa Myōjin (諏訪明神 / 諏方明神) or Suwa Daimyōjin (諏訪大明神 / 諏方大明神) after Suwa Grand Shrine (Suwa Taisha) in Nagano Prefecture in which he is enshrined alongside his consort Yasakatome, Takeminakata is historically worshiped as a god of wind, water and agriculture, as well as a patron of hunting and warfare, in which capacity he enjoyed a particularly fervent cult from various samurai clans during the medieval period such as the Hōjō or the Takeda. Takeminakata was also held to be the mythical ancestor of certain families who once served at the shrine as priests, foremost among them being the Suwa clan, the high priests of the Upper Shrine of Suwa who were also revered as living vessels of the god.

There are multiple, often conflicting accounts regarding the deity. The mythology of the imperial (Yamato) court as recorded in the Kojiki (ca. 712 CE) and the Sendai Kuji Hongi portrays Takeminakata as a son of the god Ōkuninushi who was defeated by the heavenly deity Takemikazuchi and fled to Lake Suwa. Local traditions from Suwa itself, however, present markedly different narratives. These portray him, for example, as an invading deity (sometimes said to have descended from heaven) who subjugated the area's indigenous gods, as an unseen divine presence that chose a young boy as its human embodiment (the future ancestor of the Suwa clan), or as a serpentine or dragon-like being. As worship of the Suwa deity spread throughout Japan from the medieval period onward, additional legends developed, shaped by regional adaptation and the syncretism of Buddhism and Shinto. These later stories often diverged from both Suwa's own traditions and the Yamato court's account, portraying the Suwa deity, for example, as a king from India who manifested in Japan, or identifying him with figures such as the warrior Kōga Saburō.

== Name ==
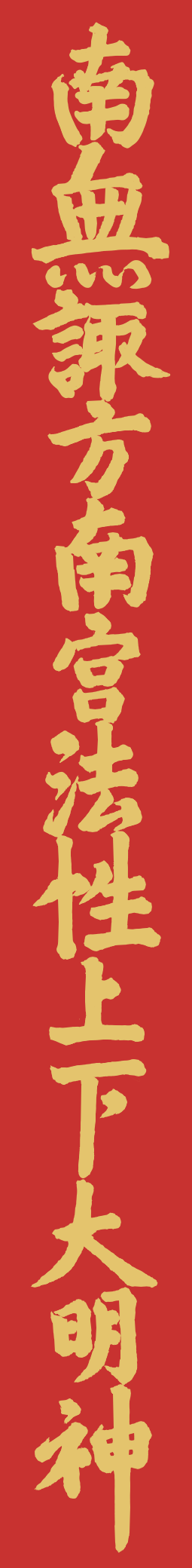
Reproduction of Takeda Shingen's Suwa Hosshō banner (諏訪法性旗). The inscription reads: Namu Suwa Nangū Hosshō Kamishimo (or Jōge) Daimyōjin (南無諏方南宮法性上下大明神)

The god is named 'Takeminakata-no-Kami' (建御名方神) in both the Kojiki (ca. 712 CE) and the Sendai Kuji Hongi (ca. 807-936 CE). Variants of the name found in the imperially commissioned national histories and other literary sources include the following:

- Minakatatomi-no-Kami (南方刀美神)
- Minakatatomi-no-Mikoto-no-Kami (御名方富命神)
- Takeminakatatomi-no-Mikoto (健御名方富命 / 建御名方富命)
- Takeminakatatomi-no-Mikoto-no-Kami (建御名方富命神)

The etymology of the name '(Take)minakata(tomi)' is unclear. While most commentators seem to agree that take- (and probably -tomi) are honorifics, they differ in how to interpret the other components of the name. Some of the proposed solutions are as follows.

- The Edo period kokugaku scholar Motoori Norinaga explained both take- (建) and mi- (御) as honorifics (称名 tatae-na), with kata (方) as yet another tatae-na meaning "hard" or "firm" (堅). Basil Chamberlain followed Motoori's lead and rendered the god's name as 'Brave-August-Name-Firm' in his translation of the Kojiki.
- Ōta Akira (1926) interpreted take-, mi- and -tomi as honorifics and took Nakata (名方) to be a place name: Nakata District (名方郡) in Awa Province (modern Ishii, Tokushima Prefecture), where Takeminatomi Shrine (多祁御奈刀弥神社) stands. Ōwa Iwao (1990) suggests that the presence of Azumi people in both Awa and Shinano, as well as the possible connection between the Azumi and the Lower Shrine of Suwa, may explain the similarity between 'Takeminakata(tomi)' and 'Takeminatomi'.
- Minakata has also been linked to the Munakata (宗像) of Kyushu. Matsuoka Shizuo (1936) interpreted Minakatatomi as originally being a goddess – citing the fact that the deities of Munakata shrine were female – that was later conflated with the male god Takeminakata.
- Another explanation proposes minakata to mean "south(ern)" (南方). A variant of this hypothesis sees the name as hinting at a connection between the god and metalworking, in which the southern direction is important: Mayumi Tsunetada (1981) for instance proposed that Takeminakata's name refers to the southern pillar of a takadono (a high-roofed house housing a tatara furnace). Gustav Heldt's translation of the Kojiki (2014), where the name is translated as 'Brave Southward Smelter', follows this interpretation.
- Yet another theory interprets mi(na)- to mean "water" (水), pointing to the god being a water deity perhaps associated with Lake Suwa. The full name is thought to derive from a word denoting a body of water or a waterside region such as 水潟 (minakata, "lagoon" or "inlet") or 水県 (mi(na)- "water" + agata "country(side)").
- An alternative explanation for the word -tomi (as well as the -tome in 'Yasakatome', the name of this god's consort) is to link it with dialectal words for "snake" (tomi, tobe, or tōbe), thereby seeing the name as hinting to the god being a kind of serpentine water deity (mizuchi).

=== Suwa Daimyōjin ===
During the medieval and early modern periods, the god enshrined in Suwa Grand Shrine – specifically, in the Upper Shrine (Kamisha) located southeast of Lake Suwa – was popularly known as Suwa Daimyōjin (諏訪大明神 / 諏方大明神) or Suwa Myōjin (諏訪明神), a name also applied via metonymy to the shrine itself. The name '(Take)minakata(tomi)' was rarely used, if at all, during this period: indeed, medieval documents from Suwa Shrine simply refer to the god as sonshin / sonjin (尊神, "revered deity") or myōjin (明神, "bright deity" or "manifest deity"). This however is hardly unusual, as before the early modern period use of titles such as myōjin or gongen for various gods and their shrines were so widespread that these deities were rarely referred to by their classical names.

Other epithets applied to the Suwa deity include Nangū Daimyōjin (南宮大明神, "Daimyōjin of the Southern Shrine (Nangū)"), Hosshō Daimyōjin (法性大明神, "Dharma-Nature Daimyōjin"), a combination of the two such as Nangū Hosshō Daimyōjin (南宮法性大明神), or Suwa Hosshō Kamishimo (or Jōge) Daimyōjin (諏訪法性上下大明神, "Dharma-Nature Daimyōjin of the Upper and Lower Suwa [Shrines]"). Some of the war banners used by Sengoku daimyō Takeda Shingen (a devotee of the god) for instance contain the inscription Suwa Nangū Hosshō Kamishimo / Jōge Daimyōjin (諏訪南宮法性上下大明神 / 諏方南宮法性上下大明神). A hanging scroll given by Emperor Go-Nara (reigned 1526–1557) to the Upper Shrine in 1553 (Tenbun 22), written in the emperor's own calligraphy, refers to the god as Suwa Shōichii Nangū Hossho Daimyōjin (諏方正一位南宮法性大明神, "Dharma-Nature Daimyōjin of the Suwa Nangū, of Upper First Rank").

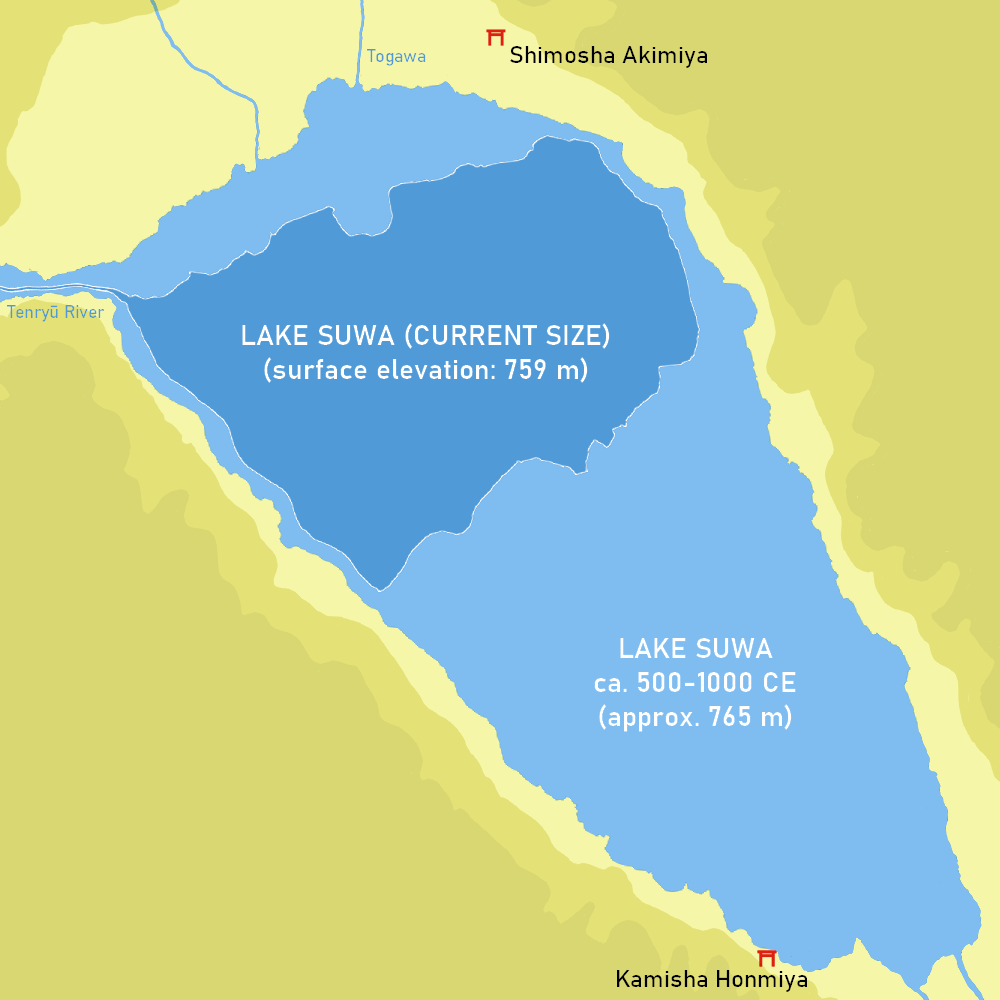
Comparison of Lake Suwa at its prime (Kofun - Heian periods) with its current size. Also shown are two of the four shrines that comprise Suwa Taisha (Kamisha Honmiya and Shimosha Akimiya).

A number of explanations have been proposed for the origin of the term Nangū. One theory posits it to refer to the geographical location of the Upper Suwa Shrine, which is located southeast of Lake Suwa, at the southern half of Shinano Province, while another claims it to be derived from 'Minakatatomi' (南方刀美), one of the variant names for the deity, with minakata being apparently understood to mean "south(ern)" (cf. etymology of 'Takeminakata' above). The term has also been interpreted to come from the medieval belief that the Suwa deity was the guardian of the south side of the imperial palace or the Shinto-Buddhist concept that the god is an enlightened being who manifested in this world, which in Buddhist cosmology is the southern continent of Jambudvīpa.

Aside from Suwa Shrine, Nangū was also applied to Kanayamahiko Shrine in Mino Province (modern Nangū Taisha in Gifu Prefecture) and Aekuni Shrine (南宮大菩薩, Nangū Daibosatsu) in Iga Province (modern Mie Prefecture). A song in the late Heian period anthology Ryōjin Hishō associates the three shrines together, with Suwa Shrine being identified as the "head" of the three Nangū shrines (南宮の本山, nangu no honzan), the shrine at Mino as the "midmost shrine" (中の宮, naka no miya), and the shrine at Iga as the "youngest shrine" (稚の宮, chigo no miya).

Hosshō, meanwhile, is believed to refer to the concept of the dharmakāya (法性身, hosshōshin), the formless, transcendent ultimate truth that is the source of all buddhas, which are its physical manifestations (nirmāṇakāya). A certain medieval legend claims that the Suwa deity chose an eight-year-old boy to become his priest while declaring: "I have no (physical) body and so make this priest my body".

== Mythology ==
=== In imperial mythology ===
==== Parentage ====
Takeminakata is portrayed in both the Kojiki and the Sendai Kuji Hongi as a son of the god Ōkuninushi, although the former does not include him in its genealogy of Ōkuninushi's children. The Kuji Hongi meanwhile identifies him as the son of Ōnamuchi (Ōkuninushi) with one of his wives, Nunakawahime of Koshi.

==== Defeat by Takemikazuchi ====
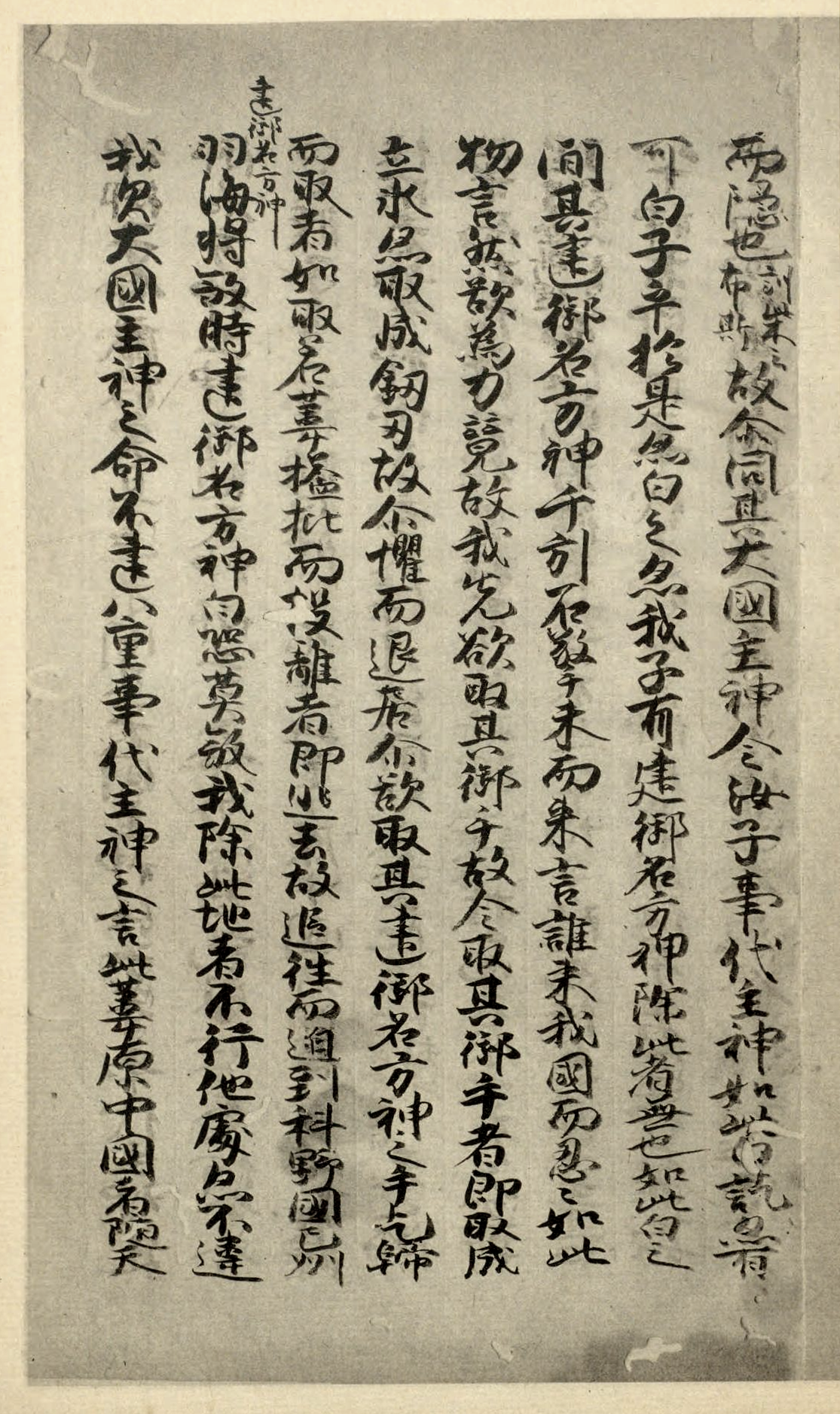
The passage concerning Takeminakata's appearance and defeat from the oldest extant manuscript of the Kojiki, the Shinpukuji-bon (真福寺本, written 1371–1372)

Takeminakata appears in both the Kojiki and the Kuji Hongi in the context of Ōkuninushi's "transfer of the land" (kuni-yuzuri) to the amatsukami, the gods of the heavenly realm of Takamagahara.

When the heavenly deities, headed by the sun goddess Amaterasu and/or the primordial deity Takamimusubi, sent Takemikazuchi and another messenger (Note: Ame-no-Torifune in the Kojiki, Futsunushi in the Nihon Shoki and the Kuji Hongi) to demand that Ōkuninushi relinquish his authority over the earthly realm of Ashihara no Nakatsukuni (the "Central Land of Reed-Plains") to Amaterasu's progeny, he told the messengers to consult his son Kotoshironushi, who immediately accepted their demands and advised his father to do likewise. Upon being asked if he had any other sons who ought to express their opinion, Ōkuninushi told the messengers that he had another son named Takeminakata. Takeminakata then appeared, bearing a heavy boulder (千引之石, chibiki no iwa, i.e. a boulder so large it would take a thousand men to pull) on his fingertips, challenging Takemikazuchi to a test of strength. Takeminakata attempted to grab the messenger's arm(s), (Note: Literally "hand(s)" (手).) but Takemikazuchi transformed them into a column of ice and then a sword blade, frightening him. Takemikazuchi then retaliated by grasping and crushing Takeminakata's arm(s) "like a young reed." The defeated god fled to "the sea of Suwa in the land of Shinano," where he was cornered. To save his life, Takeminakata vowed never to leave Suwa and gave his assent to his father's and brother's decision. With Takeminakata's surrender, Ōkuninushi finally ceded the land to the amatsukami and withdrew himself into the unseen spirit world.

==== Variants and retellings ====
===== Suwa Daimyōjin Ekotoba =====
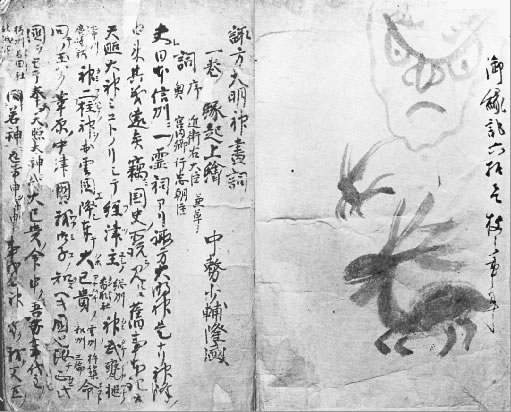
The gonhōri-bon (権祝本) manuscript of the Suwa Daimyōjin Ekotoba

The opening section of the Suwa Daimyōjin Ekotoba, a Nanboku-chō period compilation of legends and other information regarding Suwa Shrine and its festivals completed in 1356, retells the Kuji Hongi version of this story, albeit with Takeminakata's shameful defeat in the hands of Takemikazuchi notably omitted.

In the province of Shinano in Japan, there is a sacred shrine [known as] Suwa Daimyōjin. The origins of the deity's descent are ancient and profound. According to the accounts preserved in the national histories, the Kuji Hongi relates the following:

By command of Amaterasu-Ōmikami, the two deities Futsunushi-no-Kami (of Katori Shrine in Shimōsa Province) and Takeikatsuchi-no-Kami (of Kashima Shrine in Hitachi) went down to the land of Izumo. There they declared to Ōanamuchi (of Kitsuki in Izumo [and] Miwa in Yamato): "The Central Land of Reed-Plains is the land destined to be ruled by our heir. Will you therefore offer this land up to the heavenly deities?"

Ōanamuchi said, "I shall ask my son Kotoshironushi-no-Kami (of Nagata Shrine in Settsu; eighth [patron deity of] the Jingi-kan) and give you an answer."

Kotoshironushi-no-Kami said, "My father should indeed respectfully withdraw. I too shall not oppose it."

[The messengers said,] "Do you have any other sons who ought to speak?"

"There is also my son, Takeminakata-no-Kami (of Suwa Shrine)."

[He] came, bearing a heavy boulder on his fingertips, saying, "Who is it who has come to our land and is talking so furtively? I wish to challenge you to a test of strength."

When he took his hand, he [Takeminakata] caused ice to appear, and then he manifested a sword. Upon arriving at the sea of Suwa in the land of Shinano, Takeminakata-no-Kami said, "I will go to no other place."

This, then, is the original cause of this shrine's manifestation (当社垂迹ノ本縁). (Note: 「天照太神ミコトノリシテ経津主ノ総州香取社神武甕槌ノ常州鹿島社神二柱ノ神ヲ出雲国ニ降タテマツリテ、大己貴雲州杵築・和州三輪ノ命ニ問テノタマハク、葦原ノ中津国者我御子の知ラスヘキ国ナリ。汝マサニ此国ヲモテ天ノ神ニ奉ンヤ、大己貴ノ命申サク、我子事代主摂州長田社・神祇官第八ノ神ニ問テ返事申サント申、事代主神申サク、我父ヨロシクマサニサリ奉ルヘシ。ワレモ我タカウヘカラスト申。又申ヘキ子アリヤ、又我子建御名方諏訪社ノ神、千引ノ石ヲ手末ニサヽケテ来テ申サク、是我国ニキタリテ、シノヒテカクイフハ、シカウシテ力クラヘセント思、先ソノ御手ヲ取テ即氷ヲ成立、又剣ヲ取成、科野ノ国洲羽ノ海ニイタルトキ、当御名方ノ神申サク、ワレ此国ヲ除者他処ニ不行云々、是則当社垂迹ノ本縁也。」)

Originally, it was believed that the compiler, Suwa (Kosaka) Enchū (1295-1364), a member of a branch of the Suwa clan based in Kyoto, deliberately edited the story to cast the shrine's deity in a more favorable light. However, recent scholarship by Ryōtarō Maeda (2020) suggests Enchū did not have access to the Kuji Hongi text itself; rather, he appears to have relied on an abridged excerpt titled "The Matter of Suwa Shrine" (諏方社事, Suwa-sha no koto) that happened to omit the passage describing Takeminakata’s defeat. This text is found appended to the Kojiki Jōkan-shō (古事記上巻抄,“Excerpt from the Upper Volume of the Kojiki”), a manuscript copy of the Kojiki's kuni-yuzuri account preserved in the library of Shinpuku-ji (Ōsu Kannon) in Nagoya.

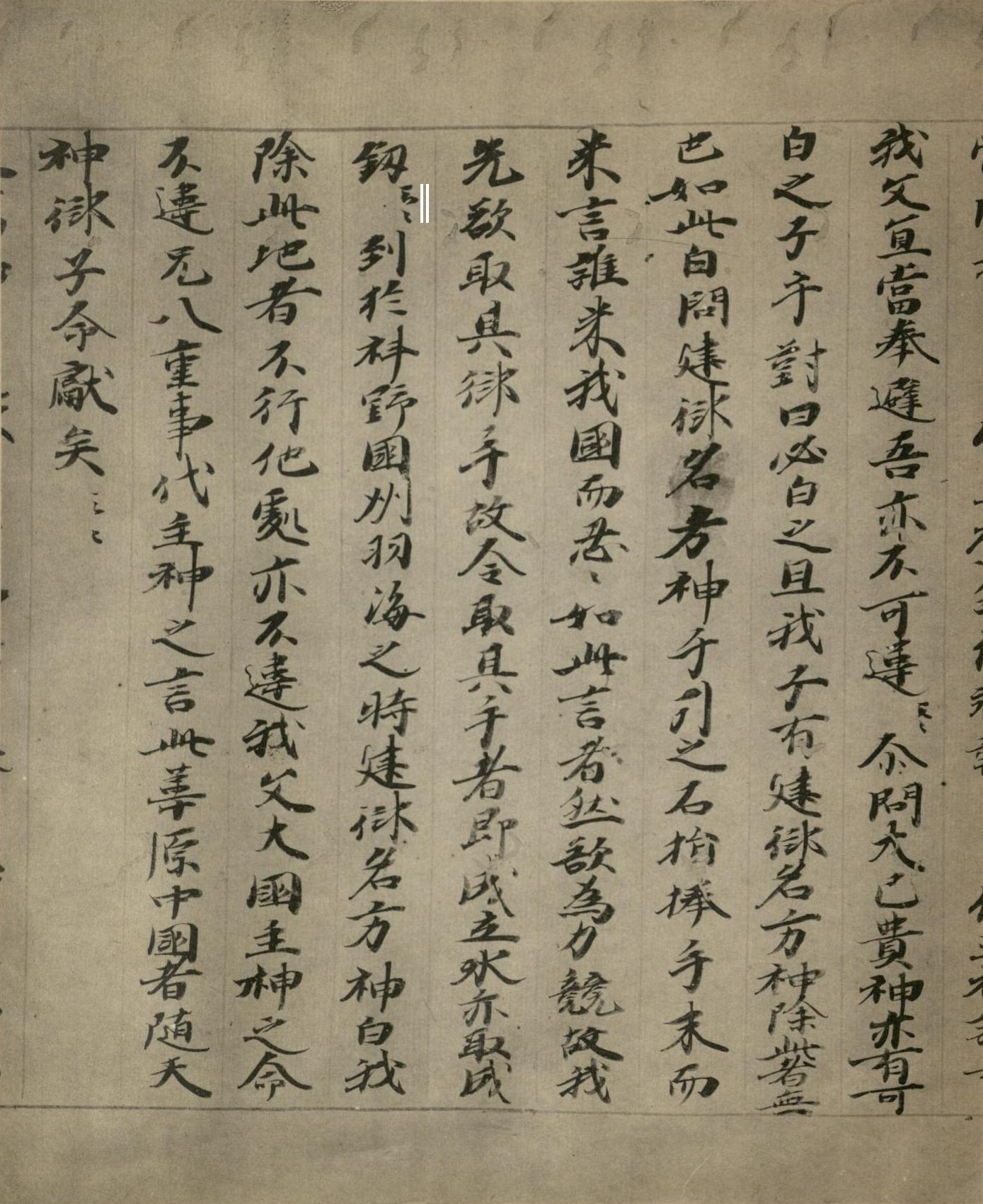
Part of "The Matter of Suwa Shrine" (諏方社事, Suwa-sha no koto) appended to the Shinpuku-ji Kojiki Jōkan-shō. The omission of the passage recounting Takeminakata's defeat is marked with an 云々 (unnun, "and so forth," "etc." - fourth column from left)

This excerpt is thought to have been produced by the Urabe clan, a priestly lineage associated with the Yoshida and Hirano Shrines in Kyoto influential in the Department of Divinities (Jingi-kan). The Urabe frequently utilized the Kuji Hongi as a primary reference for inquiries regarding shrine origins. During his research for what would become the Ekotoba, Enchū is known to have consulted with two Urabe clan members—Urabe Kanetoyo (卜部兼豊) of the Yoshida branch, then serving as senior assistant director (神祇大輔, jingi taifu) of the Jingi-kan, and Urabe Kanemae (卜部兼前) of the Hirano branch. It is highly probable that one of these men provided Enchū with the redacted account.

The ambiguity in the classical Chinese syntax also apparently allowed Enchū to reinterpret the narrative. While the original myth has Takemikazuchi transforming his own arm into ice and a sword, the Ekotoba presents it as Takeminakata manifesting these elements as a display of his power (即氷ヲ成立、又劍ヲ取成, "he (Takeminakata) caused ice to appear, and then he manifested a sword"). This reinterpretation transformed Takeminakata from a defeated figure into a triumphant god who chose to remain in Suwa of his own volition.

A Shinto-Buddhist liturgical text (講式, kōshiki) composed by Enchū around the same time period as the Ekotoba, the Suwa Daimyōjin Koshiki (諏方大明神講式), makes use of the Kugi Hongi account in a similar vein:

The manifestations of great avatars (大權ノ應迹) appear according to the needs of beings, and the comings and goings of the unseen hosts are not fixed by time. Sometimes the [Suwa] Deity is regarded as a spirit born in foreign lands (他國應生之靈); at other times, a fundamental deity of our country (我朝根本之神). These diverging narratives are inconsistent and difficult for ordinary minds to fathom. Yet the divine workings are inexhaustible and cannot be confined to a single aspect. (...) [W]hen one consults the Sendai Kuji Hongi concerning the events surrounding the [Deity's] descent in the Divine Age, it becomes clear that the origins of our country's earthly deities far precede the 'primordial beginnings' of other nations. In that text, it is written that the deity of this shrine is none other than Takeminakata-no-Kami, the divine grandson of Sosanō-no-Mikoto and the son of Ōanamuchi-no-Kami.

Volume 3 of the Kuji Hongi states:

"When he arrived at the Sea of Suwa in the land of Shinano, Takeminakata-no-Kami declared: "I will go to no other place. I will not disobey the command of my father, Ōkuninushi-no-Kami, nor the words of my elder brother, Yae-Kotoshironushi-no-Kami. I yield this Central Land of Reed Plains to the august child of the heavenly deities.'"

It further says:

"Takeminakata-no-Kami dwells in Suwa Shrine of Suwa District in Shinano Province."

He is thus, without question, a fundamental numinous deity of the land of Wa (和國根本之靈神). Could he not truly be the original master of the founding of Japan (日本草創之本主)? The record cannot be doubted; this narrative is most worthy of our trust.

This more heroic depiction of Takeminakata in the Ekotoba and the Kōshiki had a lasting impact, especially before the Kojiki became widely popular during the Edo period. It introduced this version of the myth (which seems to have originally been specific to the imperial court and was unknown in Suwa itself - see 'Analysis' below) to the Suwa region, where it influenced subsequent texts.

According to Maeda (2023), the Ekotoba was probably not introduced to Suwa before the 17th century, although the Kōshiki seems to have been known earlier among Suwa Shrine’s priestly families, as indicated by allusions in late 15th-century documents produced by the Upper Shrine’s Moriya clan (守矢氏). Over time, the Ekotoba gained acceptance among Suwa’s priestly clans, who produced numerous copies of it. For example, the Shinshu Suwa Daimyōjin Engi (信州諏方大明神縁起, "The Origin Story of Suwa Daimyōjin of Shinano Province"), written in 1684 by the hatamoto Suwa Morieda (1646-1695), the younger brother of Suwa Tadaharu, the third daimyō of Takashima Domain, retells the reinterpreted kuni-yuzuri myth. Morieda framed Takeminakata's actions in a Neo-Confucian light, comparing his ceding of the land to a meritorious act of filial piety comparable to Taibo's renunciation of the throne of Zhou.

They (Futsunushi and Takemikazuchi) also made the declaration [to cede the land] to this god (Takeminakata), but this god would not easily give his assent. Bearing a heavy boulder on his fingertips, he came, saying, "Who has come forth, saying these things? I wish to have a contest of strength." [But] he repented and eventually ceded the Central Land to the Heavenly Grandson. He departed, arriving at the sea of Suwa in the land of Shinano.
'It may be said that he is supreme in virtue, and the people could not praise him [enough].' (可謂至徳也、已民無得而稱焉) (Note: Quotation from Confucius' Analects: "It may be said that Taibo was supreme in virtue. Three times he renounced the sovereignty of all things under Heaven, but the people could not praise him." (泰伯其可謂至徳也已矣、三以天下譲、民無得而稱焉。)) This is he who is now known as Suwa Daimyōjin.

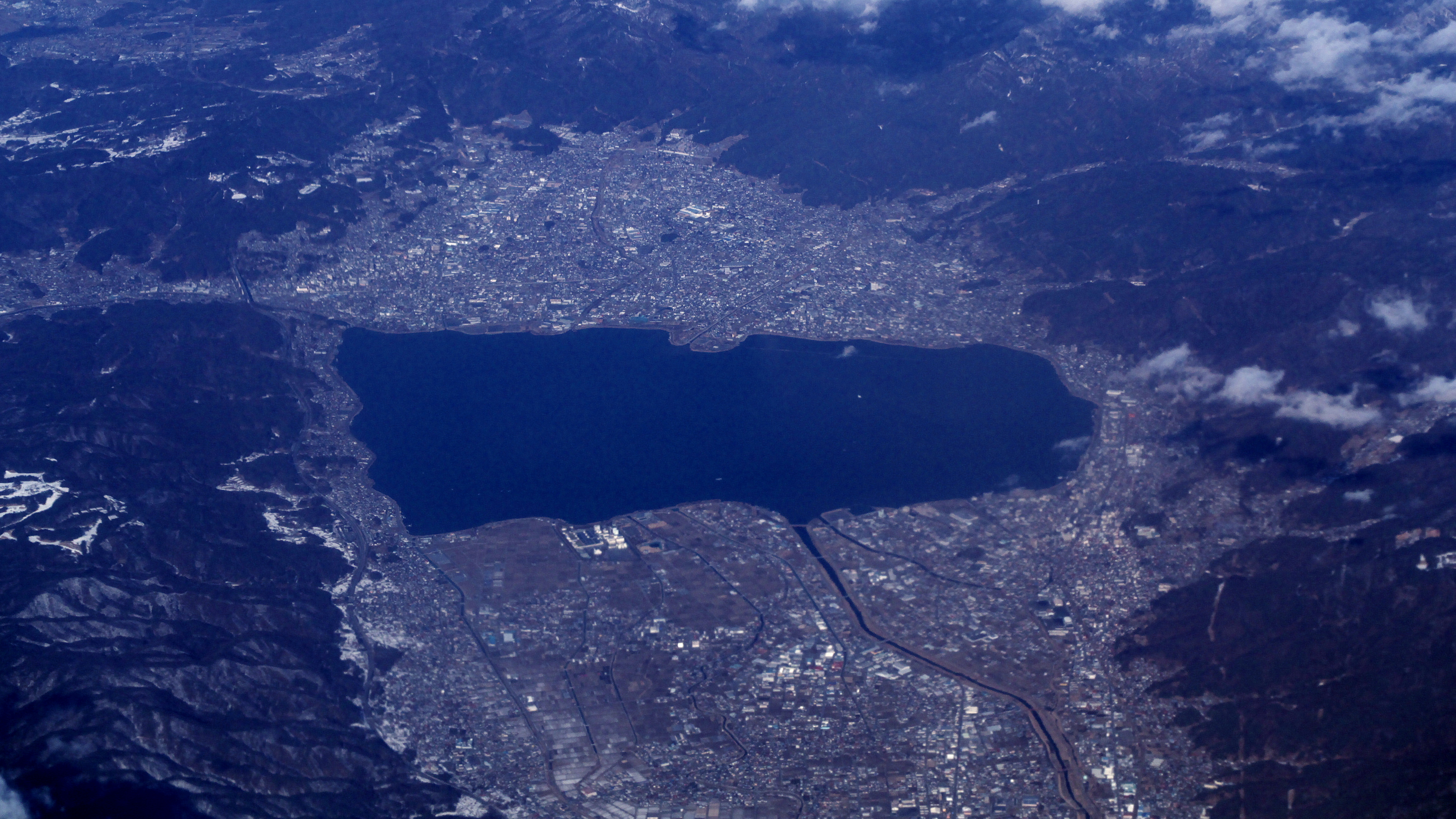
Lake Suwa

Even in the 19th century, when knowledge of the Kojiki and its less flattering account of Takeminakata's defeat became more widespread, this positive reinterpretation persisted within Suwa: a mid-19th century genealogical chart of Takeminakata issued by the Upper Shrine for instance quotes the Shinshu Suwa Daimyōjin Engi. A document submitted in 1834 to the Commissioner of Shrines and Temples (Jisha-bugyō) by the Lower Shrine's Momoi clan (桃井氏) of priests relates the following:

When, by the command of the heavenly deities, the two deities of Kashima and Katori descended to the land of Izumo, and while they were disputing over the land, he [Takeminakata] took up a heavy rock on his fingertips and engaged in a contest of strength. He also took up a sword and displayed valor. He led [an army of] divine soldiers and arrived at the sea of Suwa in the land of Shinano, where he made a solemn vow:

"The Central Land of the Reed Plains is to be yielded to the Heavenly Grandson. As my divine father has ceded the land, I shall never go to another place."

This is the account of this shrine's establishment.

A third text found in the Moriya family archives titled "The Origin of Suwa Daimyōjin" (諏訪大明神由来, Suwa Daimyōjin yurai) features Takeminakata striking fear into Futsunushi and Takemikazuchi after displaying his power to them, only agreeing to cede Ashihara no Nakatsukuni after he was convinced by their reasoning. The three then go to Suwa, where they defeat the local deity Moriya (see below).

===== Other versions =====
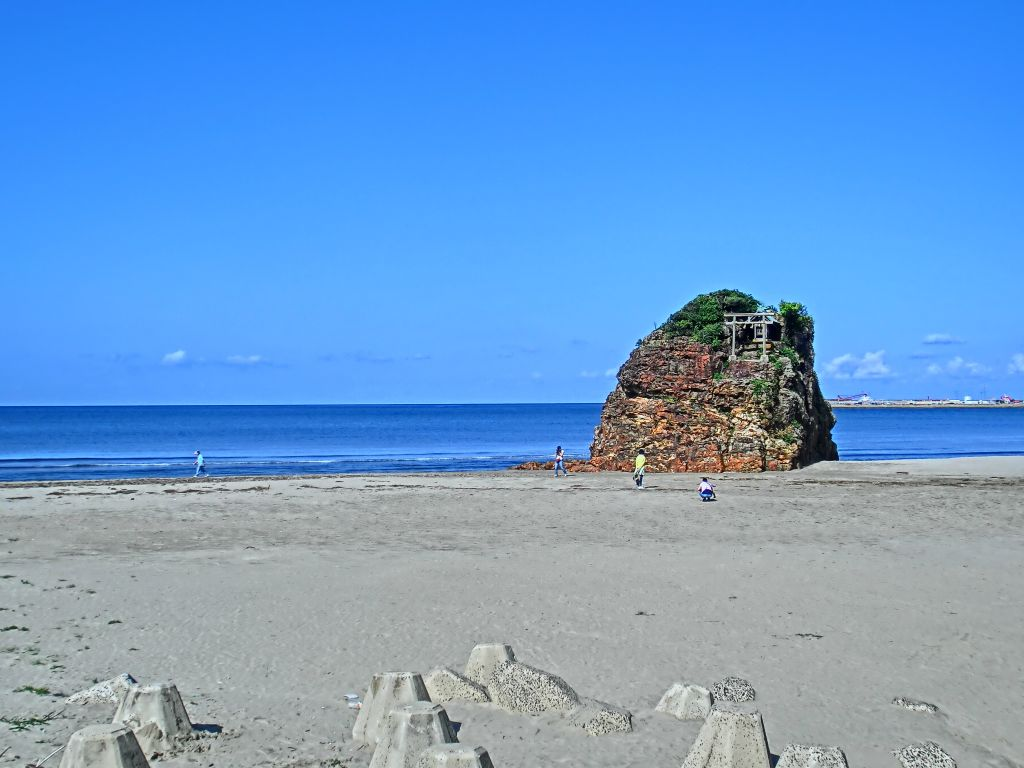
Inasa Beach in Izumo, Shimane Prefecture, the setting of the kuni-yuzuri myth cycle

Similar attempts at retelling or reinterpreting the myth in a more positive way are found in other texts. In one version, for instance, Takeminakata is portrayed as going to Suwa not so much to flee from Takemikazuchi but to pacify it under the orders of his father Ōkuninushi.

A variant found in a commentary on the Nihon Shoki penned by a 15th-century monk named Shun'yu (春瑜), the Nihon Shoki Shikenmon (日本書紀私見聞), claims 'Suwa Daimyōjin' (諏防大明神) to be the third son of the deity Sannō Gongen, the guardian deity of Mount Hiei. After engaging in a failed rebellion against Amaterasu, the deity surrendered and settled down in the land of Shinano.

Local legends from within Nagano Prefecture claim Takeminakata to have passed or stayed in various places within the region during his escape. A local legend in Shimoina District (located south of Suwa) for instance claims that Takemikazuchi caught up with the fleeing Takeminakata in the modern village of Toyooka, where they agreed to an armistice and left imprints of their hands on a rock as a sign of their agreement. The rock, bearing the gods' supposed handprints (tegata), is found in Otegata Shrine (御手形神社) in Toyooka. After Takemikazuchi's departure, Takeminakata temporarily resided in the neighboring village of Ōshika, where he discovered hot springs of saltwater while hunting for deer.

The contest between Takemikazuchi and Takeminakata has also been sometimes interpreted as an origin myth for sumo wrestling and aiki. This interpretation apparently follows an alternative reading of the text which sees Takemikazuchi as not so much crushing and tearing Takeminakata's arm(s) off but seizing him by the arm and throwing him into the ground.

=== Other myths ===
==== Entry into Suwa ====
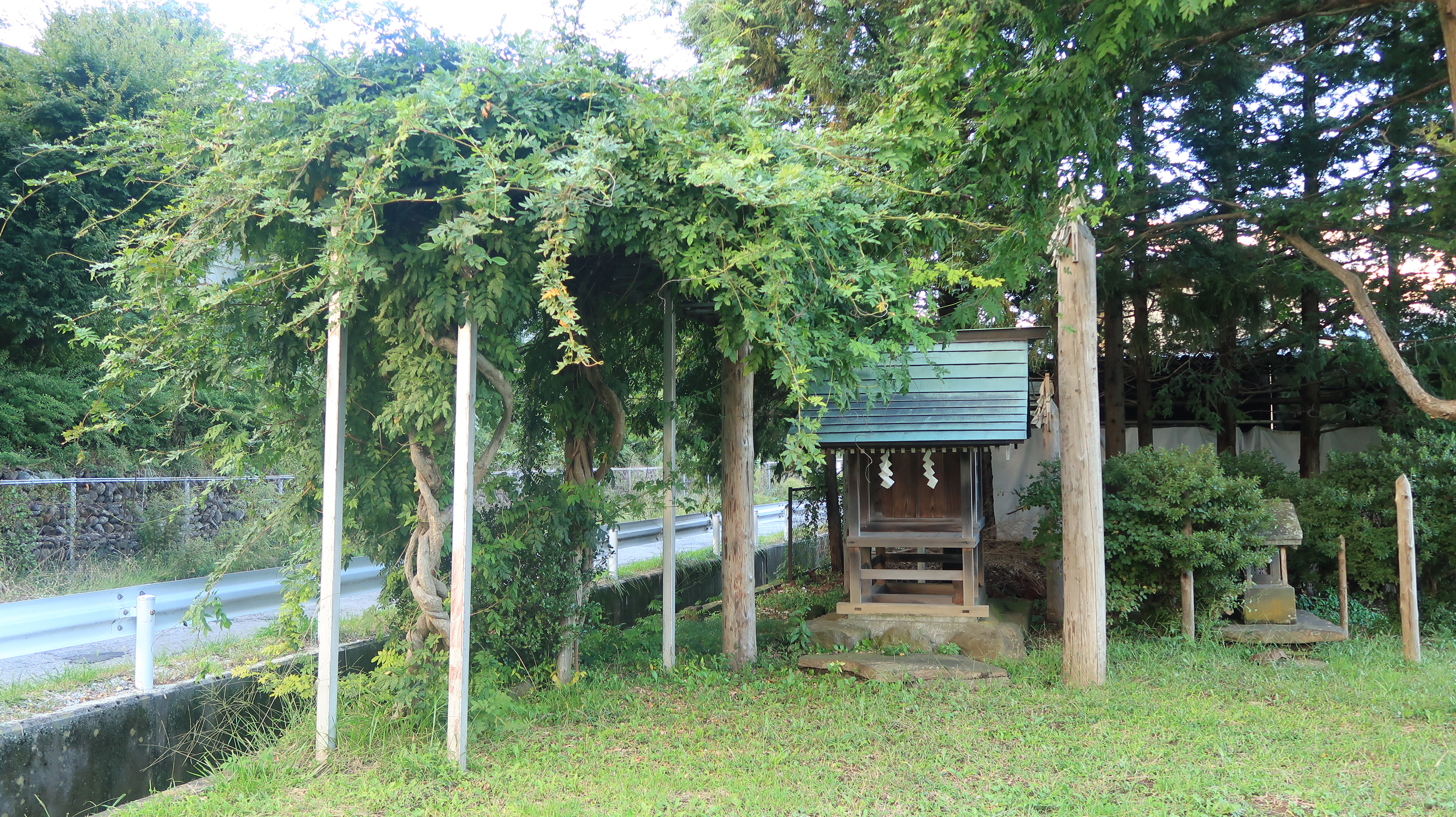
Fujishima Shrine (藤島社) in Suwa City. It is one of two 'Fujishima Shrines' associated with Suwa Myōjin's battle against Moriya; the other is located in the city of Okaya by the Tenryū River.

A foundational myth from the Suwa area portrays the advent of Suwa Myōjin and his conflict with the local god Moriya (Moreya). This story is recorded in several medieval texts, each with unique details.

The Suwa Daimyōjin Ekotoba relates a variant of this myth as an origin story of Fujishima Shrine (藤島社) in Suwa City, one of the Upper Shrine's auxiliary shrines where its yearly rice-planting ceremony is traditionally held. In this version, the deity of Fujishima Shrine (藤嶋ノ明神, Fujishima no Myōjin) - usually equated with Suwa Myōjin - defeats "Moriya the evil outlaw" (洩矢ノ惡賊, Moriya no akuzoku) with a wisteria branch:

Now, as for the deity of Fujishima [Shrine] (藤嶋ノ明神, Fujishima no Myōjin): In ancient times, when the venerable god (尊神, sonjin, i.e. Suwa Myōjin) first manifested himself, Moriya the wicked outlaw (洩矢ノ惡賊, Moriya no akuzoku), seeking to prevent the divine occupation of the land, took up an iron ring (鐵輪) to fight him, but the Myōjin picked up a wisteria branch and subdued [Moriya]. In the end, he cast down the evil ring (邪輪, jarin) and established the true Dharma (正法, shōbō). When the Myōjin made a vow and threw the wisteria branch [to the ground], immediately it took root, its branches and leaves flourished, and its blossoms bloomed brilliantly, preserving for all ages a memorial of that battlefield. For this reason he is known as the Myōjin of Fujishima ('Wisteria Island'). (Note: 「抑コノ藤嶋ノ明神ト申ハ、尊神垂迹ノ昔、洩矢ノ惡賊神居ヲサマタケントセシ時、洩矢ハ鐵輪ヲ持シテアラソヒ、明神ハ藤枝ヲトリテ是ヲ伏シ給フ。ツイニ邪輪ヲ降シテ正法ヲ興ス。 明神誓ヲ發テ、藤枝ヲナケ給シカハ、則根ヲサシテ枝葉ヲサカヘ、花蘂アサヤカニシテ、戰場ノシルシヲ萬代ニ殘ス。藤嶋ノ明神ト号スル此ユヘナリ。」)

Another version of this myth is recorded in the Suwa Nobushige Gejō (諏訪信重解状, "The Petition of Suwa Nobushige"). This document purports to be a formal petition submitted in 1249 by the Upper Shrine of Suwa's high priest or Ōhōri (大祝), Suwa Nobushige, to the Kamakura shogunate in order to assert the Upper Shrine's primacy and legitimacy over the Lower Suwa Shrine. However, it is now regarded by some scholars as apocryphal, likely a forgery created in the 14th century or later. In this version, the Suwa deity is portrayed as descending from heaven in order to take possession of the land of 'Moriya Daijin' (守屋大臣, lit. 'Minister Moriya').

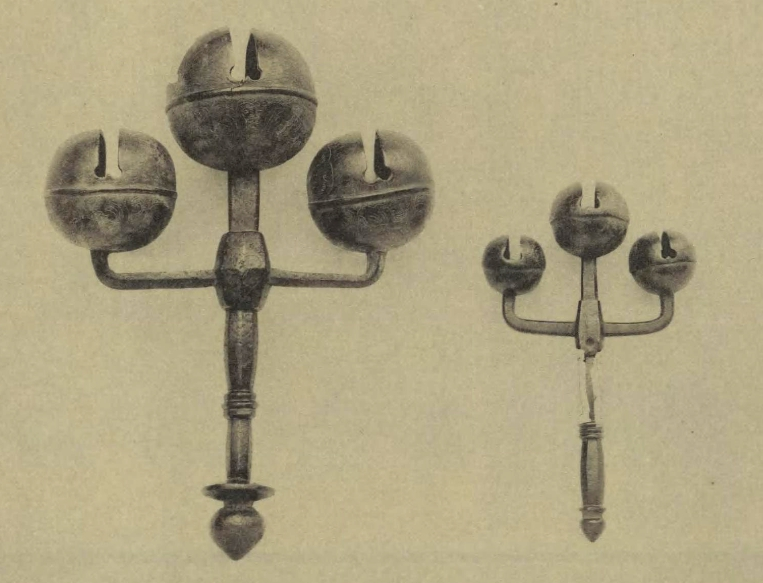
The yasaka no suzu (八栄の鈴), a set of bronze bells dating from the Heian period kept in the Upper Suwa Shrine. Medieval myth claimed it to be one of the treasures Suwa Myōjin brought with him when he first arrived in Suwa.

On the [Deity's] Manifestation at the Foot of Mount Moriya (守屋山麓御垂跡事)

Upon reverent examination of ancient traditions (舊貫), [we have found that] this place (砌, migiri) was once the domain of the Minister Moriya (守屋大臣, Moriya Daijin). When the great god (大神, i.e. Suwa Myōjin) came down from heaven, the Minister attempted to prevent the Myōjin from residing here, striving to repel him. The Myōjin, in turn, devised a secret plan to make this land his own. This led to disputes, and then to outright battles, with neither side able to claim victory.

Hereupon, the Myōjin brought forth a wisteria hook (藤鎰), while the Minister wielded an iron hook (鐵鎰). Anchoring them into the [contested] ground, they pulled [against one another]; the Myōjin, with his wisteria hook, emerged victorious in this martial contest. He then cast out and punished Minister Moriya.

From the time he chose this shrine as his abode until now, hundreds of years have passed, during which the fame of our god has spread throughout the land. The traces [of his miraculous deeds] remain visible even today (lit. "The traces are ever new").

The Myōjin planted the wisteria hook in front of this shrine, and it grew and flourished, becoming known as the "Forest of Fujisuwa" (藤諏訪之森). Twice a year, sacred rites are performed there. Since then, this district has been named 'Suwa' (諏方).

Now the Lower Shrine, by virtue of a marital pact with [the god of] our shrine, is known as [the shrine of] 'Hime Daimyōjin' (姫大明神). Yet had the great deity (Daimyōjin) [of the Upper Shrine] not driven out Moriya, how could the two of them have determined their dwelling place? Thus, it is perfectly clear that [the Upper Shrine] had been the main shrine since the very moment [its deity] descended from heaven. (Note: 「一 守屋山麓御垂跡事 右謹檢舊貫、當砌昔者守屋大臣之所領也、大神天降御之刻、大臣者奉禦明神之居住、勵制止之方法、明神者廻可爲御敷地之祕計、或致諍論、或及合戰之處、兩方難決雌雄、爰明神者持藤鎰、大臣者以鐵鎰、懸此所引之、明神即以藤鎰令勝得軍陣之諍論給、而間令追罰守屋大臣、卜居所當社以來、遙送數百歲星霜、久施我神之稱譽天下給、應跡之方々是新哉、明神以彼藤鎰自令植當社之前給、藤榮枝葉號藤諏訪之森、毎年二ヶ度御神事勤之、自尓以來以當郡名諏方、爰下宮者當社依夫婦之契約示姫大明神之名、然而當大明神、若不令追出守屋給者、爭兩者卜居御哉、自天降之元初爲本宮之條炳焉者哉、」)

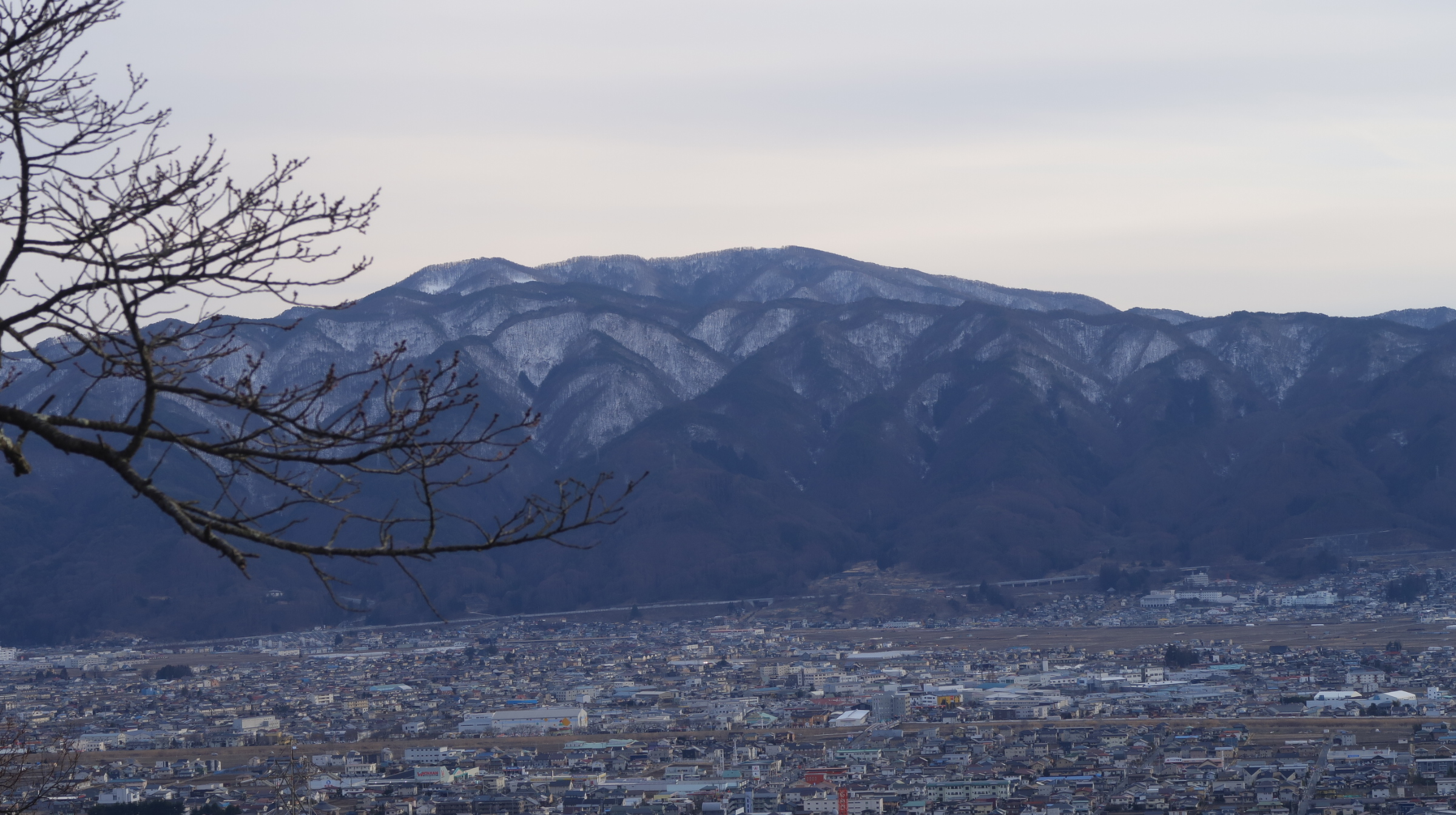
Mount Moriya (守屋山) as seen from Tateishi Park, Suwa City

This portrayal of Suwa Myōjin as a heavenly deity can also be observed in other texts such as the Inako Ōmatsubara Daimyōjin Engi (伊那古大松原大明神縁起), the origin narrative of Matsubara Suwa Shrine (located in the town of Koumi at the eastern part of Nagano Prefecture) composed in 1340, where Suwa Myōjin describes his descent couched in Buddhist terminology:

"For the benefit of all sentient beings, I hid my compassionate and gentle form and revealed a manifestation (現垂迹, lit. "caused a trace (suijaku) to appear"). I departed from the realm (lit. "capital") of Dharma-Nature (法性都); from the High Plain of Heaven, I divided heaven and earth. When I descended from heaven, I paused at the foot of this tree and, with the water of this pond, I first performed the ritual purification of my hands, rinsed my feet, and calmed my spirit. I reached the district of Suwa; at that moment, I manifested my trace."

Moriya being called 'Minister Moriya' (Moriya Daijin) in the Gejō suggests that the deity was already being conflated with the historical figure Mononobe no Moriya at the time the text was composed. The Suwa Daimyōjin Kōshiki already hints at this connection by drawing a parallel between the two figures:

Mononobe no Moriya was an enemy of Buddhism. Prince Jōgū (Shōtoku) executed him, causing the Sun of Wisdom to shine over the village of Wakaki (若木郷, lit. "Village of Young Trees"). [Likewise,] this Yamabe (?) no Moriya (山家洩矢) is the nemesis of the divine. The Deity of this shrine punished him, causing his majesty to be displayed splendidly throughout the realm of Fusō. Though these rebels differ in outward form, their names are uncannily alike.

The local deity Moriya's outright conflation with Mononobe no Moriya can already be observed in the Jinshi Keizu (神氏系図, "Genealogy of the Jin (Miwa) Clan"), a lineage record of the Kyoto branch of the Suwa clan attributed to Suwa Sadamichi (諏訪貞通), Enchū's third great-grandson and the copyist of the extant Kōshiki manuscript. The text dates the arrival of Suwa Myōjin during the reign of Emperor Yōmei (585-587) - the precise era of the historical conflict between Prince Shōtoku and Mononobe no Moriya - and describes him as defeating 'Moriya' (守屋) in a battle at Mount Moriya. This same variant appears in another genealogical record of the Suwa clan.

The Deity's arrival in Suwa District in the province of Shinano occurred during the reign of the 32nd human sovereign, Emperor Yōmei. At that time, there was an eight-year-old boy (later styled Arikazu (有員)) who accompanied the Deity. Moriya (守屋) opposed the great god, and a battle took place at Mount Moriya. The boy, leading divine troops, routed Moriya. Then, at the foot of that mountain, he established a sanctuary.

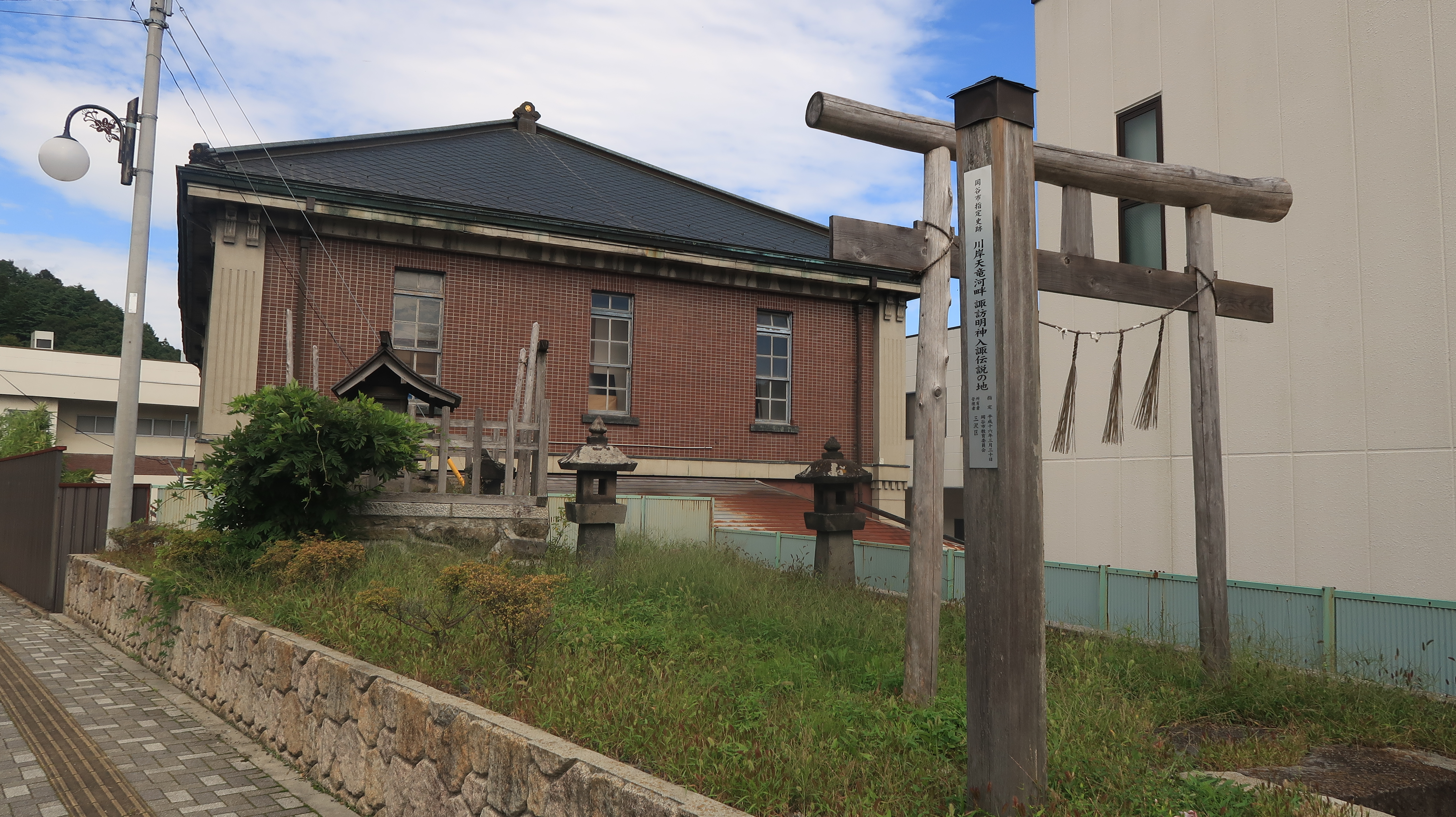
Fujishima Shrine (藤島神社) in Okaya

While medieval sources situated the battle between the two deities on the slopes of Mount Moriya near the Upper Shrine, Edo period texts present a variant tradition placing the conflict along the Tenryū River in present-day Okaya, where a shrine to Moriya stands. On the opposite shore stood a late 6th-century burial mound, which eventually came to be identified as the "Fujishima Shrine" of the myth. Local folklore recounted that wisteria vines from these opposing sites once entwined over the river, flourishing into a natural canopy so dense it resembled a massive bridge, until they were cut down by order of the local daimyō in the late 17th century.

Growing familiarity with the Kojiki's negative portrayal of Takeminakata gradually reshaped local tradition. For instance, the Jinchō Moriya-shi Keifu (神長守矢氏系譜, "Genealogy of the Jinchō Moriya Clan"), compiled in the early Meiji period, recontextualizes the local conflict: it depicts 'Minakatatomi-no-Mikoto' battling Moriya (who then surrenders and pledges his allegiance to him) after he had "fled from Izumo to the sea of Suwa." This version definitively harmonized the originally unrelated myths, setting the precedent for subsequent retellings.

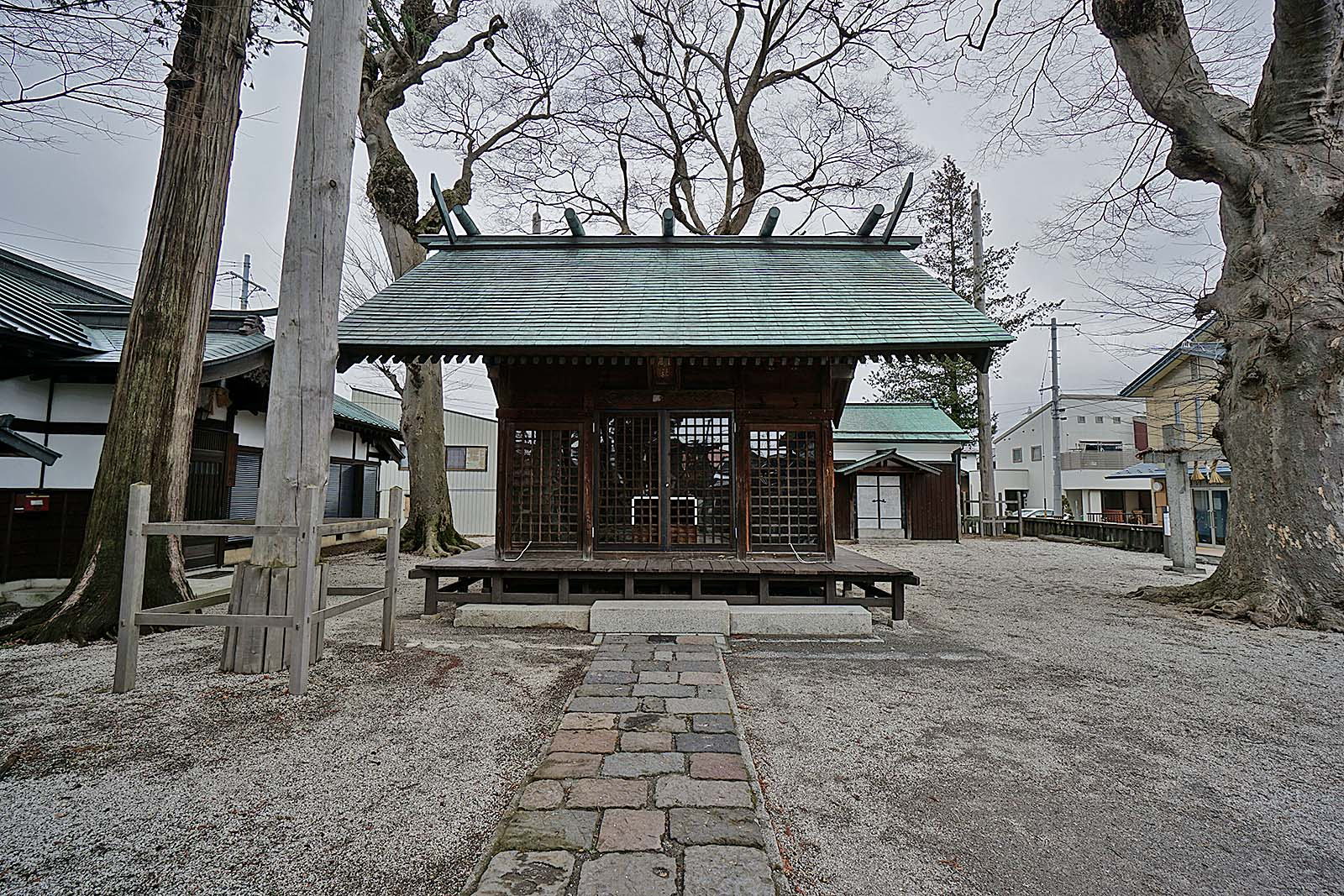
Tatsuya-Sukura Shrine (達屋酢蔵神社) in Chino, associated with the gods Yatsukao (Ganigawara) and Hikosachi in folklore

Besides Moriya, local folklore describes other deities who submitted to or resisted the Suwa deity's rule. One such figure was Yatsukao-no-Mikoto (矢塚男命), also known as Ganigawara (蟹河原長者 Ganigawara-chōja), portrayed in a late legend as a powerful horse breeder who is said to have opposed both Takeminakata and his new ally, Moriya. According to this story, Ganigawara held Moriya in contempt for surrendering and had his servants harass him. When the harassment escalated to violence against Takeminakata's dwelling, Takeminakata retaliated. In the ensuing battle, Ganigawara was mortally wounded. Begging Moriya for forgiveness, he entrusted his youngest daughter to Takeminakata, who in turn gave her in marriage to the god Taokihooi-no-Mikoto (手置帆負命), also known as Hikosachi-no-Kami (彦狭知神), (Note: Both Taokihooi and Hikosachi - identified as two distinct individuals - appear in the Nihon Shoki and the Kogo Shūi as ancestors of the Inbe clan (忌部氏).) who had been injured by Ganigawara's men.

In another legend, a god named Takei-Ōtomonushi (武居大伴主神 or 武居大友主神) swore allegiance to Takeminakata and became the ancestor of a line of priests in the Lower Shrine known as the Takeihōri (武居祝). Yet another story relates that the Suwa deity forbade the goddess of Sakinomiya Shrine (先宮神社) in Owa, Suwa City from building a bridge over the creek before her shrine as punishment for her refusal to submit to him.

==== The Ōhōri ====
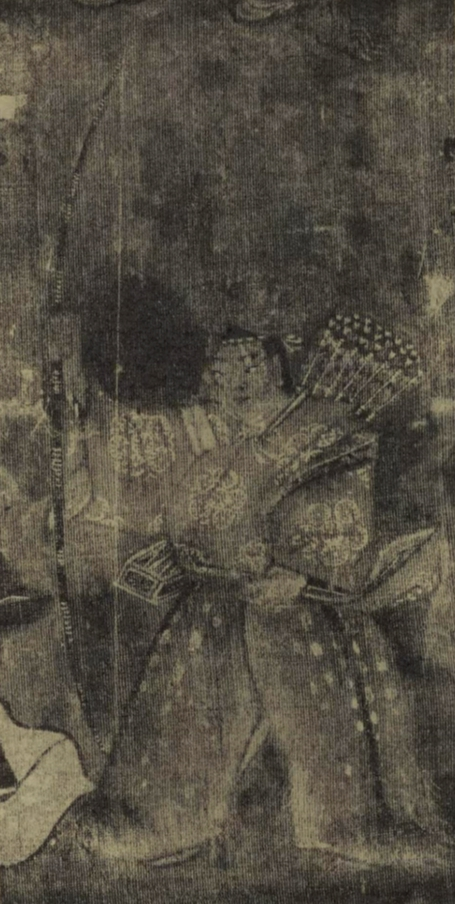
Suwa Myōjin as a warrior in hunting gear

Before the abolition of the Suwa Shrine's traditional priestly offices during the Meiji period, the Upper Shrine's high priest or Ōhōri (大祝(おおほうり), 'great priest'; alt. おおはふり, Ōhafuri; historical orthography: おほはふり, Ohohafuri) was a young boy chosen from the Suwa clan, who was, during his term of office, considered to be a living god, the visible incarnation or 'body' of the unseen god of the shrine.

The legend of how Suwa Myōjin chose his first priest is recounted in various sources:

At the beginning of the god's manifestation, he removed his sacred garment and put them on an eight year old boy, designating him the 'great priest' (Ōhōri). He then decreed: "I do not have a body and so make this priest (hōri) my body."
This [boy] is Arikazu (有員), the priest of the sacred robe (御衣祝, Misogihōri), the founding ancestor of the Miwa/Jin (神, i.e. Suwa) clan. (Note: 「祝は神明の垂迹の初。御衣を八歳の童男にぬぎきせ給ひて。大祝と称し。我において体なし。祝を以て躰とすと神勅ありけり。是則御衣祝有員神氏の始祖なり。」)

— Suwa Daimyōjin Ekotoba

After the Great Deity's (Daimyōjin) manifestation, he appeared as a living god (hitogami), safeguarding the nation in plain sight. When he perceived that the time had come to withdraw his physical form, he made a vow: "I have no separate body of my own; let the priest (hōri) serve as [my] sacred body. Whoever wishes to worship me must look upon the priest." (Note: 大明神御垂跡以後、現人神御、國家鎭護爲眼前之處、鑒機限御躰隱居之刻、御誓願云、無我別躰、以祝可爲御躰、欲拜我者、須見祝云云、)

— Suwa Nobushige Gejō

Although most sources (such as the Ekotoba above) identify the boy as Arikazu, a semi-legendary figure who is said to have lived in the 9th century (early Heian period) during the reign of Emperor Kanmu (781-806) or his immediate successors Heizei (806-809) or Saga (809-823), two genealogical lists - of disputed historical reliability - instead identify the first priest with an individual named Otoei (乙頴) or Kumako (神子 or 熊古), a son of Mase-gimi (麻背君) or Iotari (五百足), head of the Kanasashi clan and kuni no miyatsuko of Shinano during the late 6th century.

==== The King of Hadai ====
A medieval Buddhist legend portrays Suwa Myōjin as a king from India who later achieved enlightenment and went to Japan to become a native kami.

A short text attached to a late 15th century copy of an ordinance regulating the Upper Shrine's ritual purity taboos (物忌み monoimi) originally enforced in 1238 and revised in 1317, the Suwa Kamisha monoimi no rei no koto (諏訪上社物忌令之事), relates that 'Takeminakata Myōjin' (武御名方明神) was originally the ruler of a certain Indian kingdom called 'Hadai' (波堤国 Hadai-koku) (Note: This place name appears as one of the sixteen Mahājanapadas in Kumārajīva's translation of the Humane King Sutra.) who survived an insurrection instigated by a rebel named 'Moriya' (守屋 or 守洩) during the king's absence while the latter was out hunting deer. After going to Persia to rescue its inhabitants from an evil dragon, the king ruled over it for some time as 'Emperor Suwa' (陬波皇帝 Suwa Kōtei) before retiring to "cultivate the seedling of virtue and realize the Buddhist path." He eventually manifested in Japan, appearing in various places before finally choosing to dwell in Suwa.

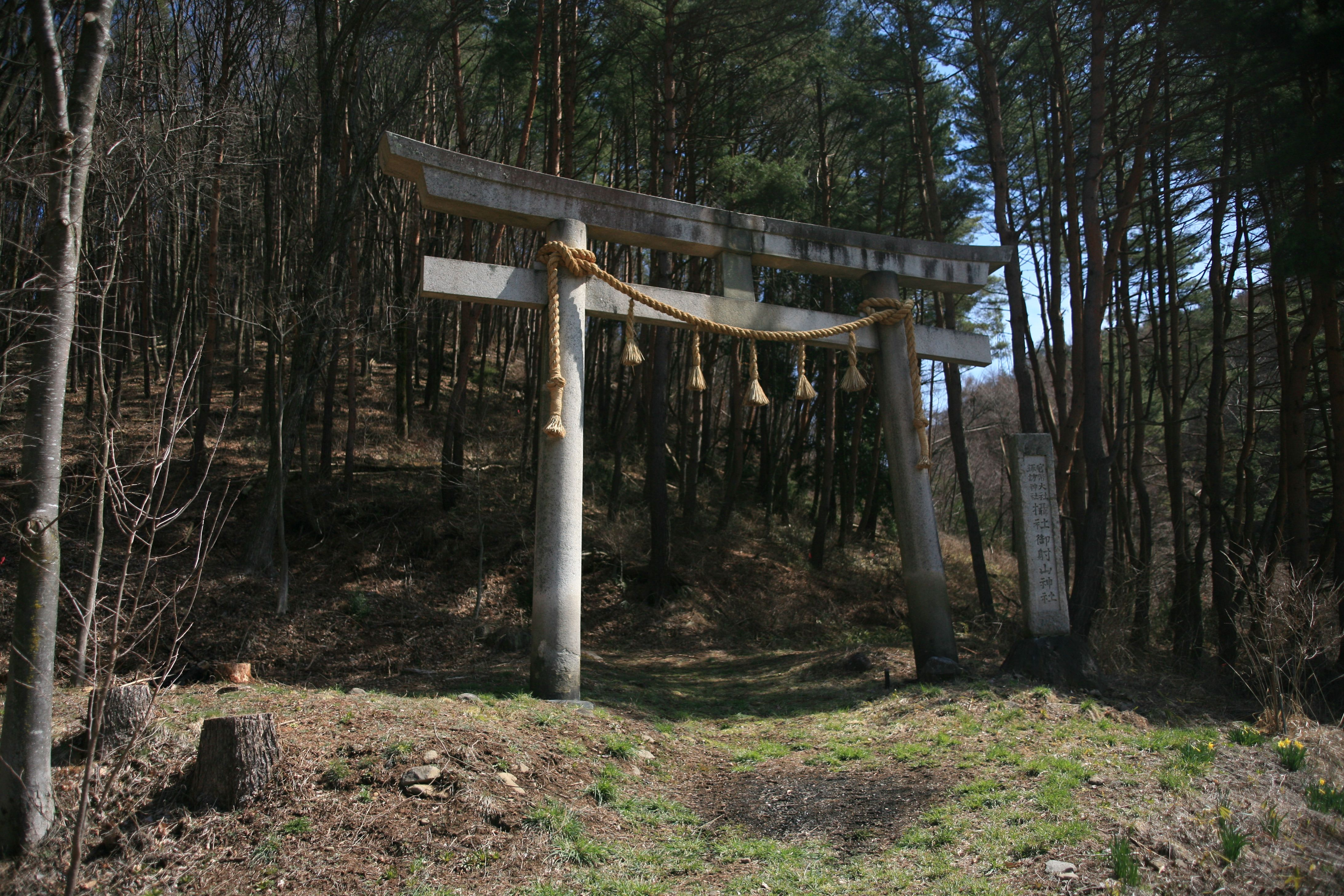
Misayama Shrine (御射山神社) in Fujimi, Nagano. During the medieval period, the hunting ceremony held at Misayama - Suwa Shrine's sacred hunting ground - was the largest of Suwa's religious ceremonies and one of its most important, attracting thousands of people.

The Suwa Daimyōjin Ekotoba relates a slightly different, fuller version of the first half of this story as an origin myth for the Upper Shrine's hunting ceremony held every seventh month of the year at Misayama (御射山) on the slopes of the Yatsugatake Mountains:

If one should inquire about the origins (因縁 in'en, lit. 'causes and conditions') of this hunt: long ago, the Daimyōjin was the king of the land of Hadai in India who went out to hunt at Deer Park from the twenty-seventh to the thirtieth day of the seventh month. At that time, a traitorous vassal named Bikyō (美教) suddenly organized an army and sought to kill the king. The king, ringing a golden bell, looked up to heaven and shouted eight times: "I am now about to be killed by this rebel. I have hunted animals, not for my own enjoyment, but in order to lead them to the Buddhist path. If this my action is in accordance with Heaven's will, may Brahmā save me."
Brahmā then saw this and commanded the four great deva-kings to wield vajra-poles and destroy the army. It is said that the Misayama (三齋山) of today reflects that event.
... One should know, therefore, that the deity's compassionate hunting is an expedient means for the salvation of creatures.

Regarding the Upper Shrine's hunting rituals, the Monoimi no rei asserts that

[The shrine's] hunts began in the deer park of Hadai-no-kuni [in India]. [The use of] hawks began in Magada-no-kuni.

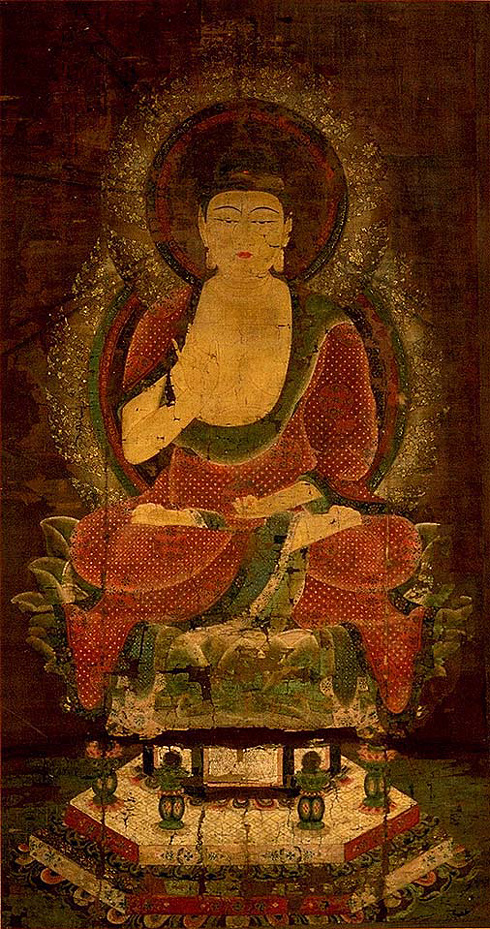
Medieval Buddhist legends claim the Suwa deity to be a relative of Gautama Buddha (pictured)

The second half of the legend (the slaying of the dragon in Persia and the king's migration to Japan) is used by the Ekotoba's compiler, Suwa Enchū, in a liturgical text, the Suwa Daimyōjin Kōshiki (諏方大明神講式), where it is introduced as an alternative, if somewhat less credible, account of the Suwa deity's origins (in comparison to the myth of Takeminakata of Izumo as found in the Kuji Hongi, touted by the same text as the authoritative origin story of the god) that nevertheless should not be suppressed. In this text, the king of Hadai is claimed to be a great-great-grandson of King Siṃhahanu (獅子頬王 Shishikyō-ō), Gautama Buddha's grandfather. Bikyō, the rebel who raised up an army against the king in India - identified as an incarnation of the Demon King (魔王) - is also said to have eventually manifested in Japan, opposing the deity in Suwa as "Moriya the evil outlaw."

A similar account appears in a work known as the Suwa Jinja Engi (諏訪神社縁起) or Suwa Shintō Engi (諏訪神道縁起), wherein the Suwa deity is identified as the son of Kibonnō (貴飯王), the son of Amṛtodana (甘呂飯王 Kanrobonnō), one of Siṃhahanu's four sons. The Lower Shrine's goddess, meanwhile, is the daughter of Prasenajit (波斯匿王 Hashinoku-ō), claimed here to be the son of Dronodana (黒飯王 Kokubonnō), another son of Siṃhananu.

===== The Suwa Mishirushibumi =====
During the Misayama festival as performed during the medieval period, the Ōhōri recited a ritual declaration supposedly composed by the Suwa deity himself known as the Suwa Mishirushibumi (陬波御記文), which begins:

I, Great King Suwa (陬波大王), have hidden my person during [the year/month/day of] the Yang Wood Horse (甲午 kinoe-uma).
[The name] 'Suwa' (陬波) and [the sign] Yang Wood Horse [and] the seal (印文) (Note: The 'seal' referred to here is interpreted to be either the Upper Shrine's sacred seal made of deer antler or the Mishirushibumi itself.) - these three are all one and the same. (Note: 「陬波大王 限甲午隠身、陬波与甲午 印文同一物三名。」)

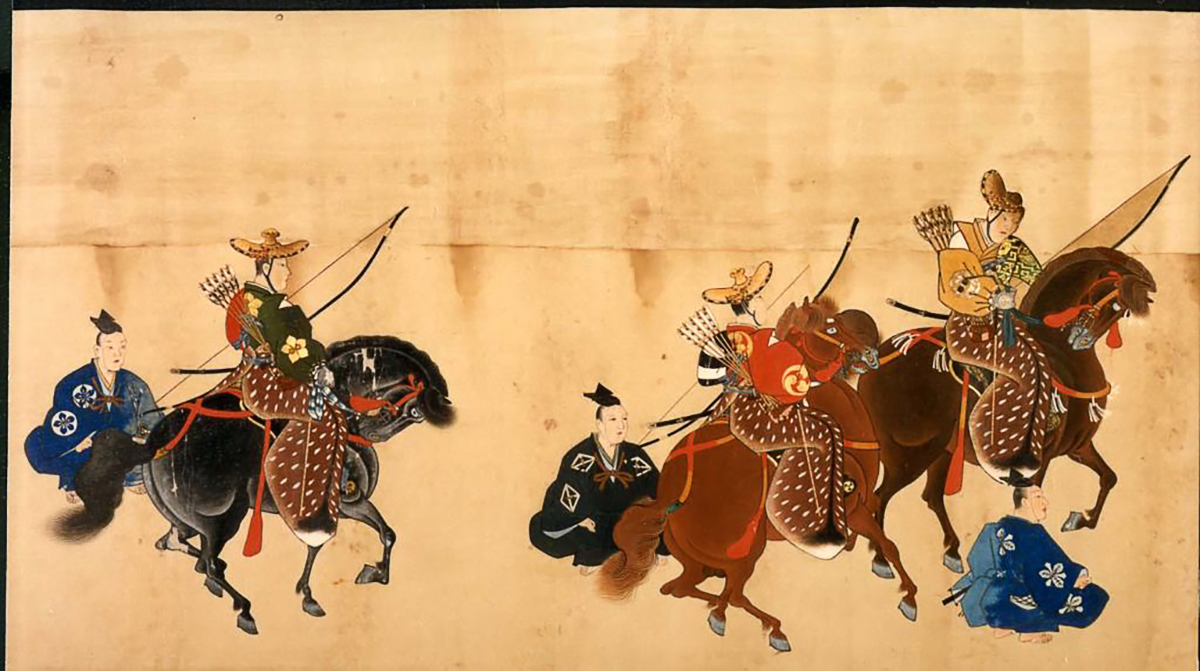
Yabusame archers in hunting gear, Edo period

Within the text, King Suwa (i.e. Suwa Myōjin) declares the Ōhōri to be his 'true body' (真神体 shin no shintai) and the Misayama (三斎山) hunting grounds below Yatsugatake (here likened to Vulture Peak in India) to be another manifestation of himself that cleanses (斎) the three (三) evils: evil thoughts, evil speech and evil actions. He promises that whoever sets foot at Misayama will not fall into the lower, evil realms of existence (悪趣 akushu); conversely, the god condemns and disowns whoever defiles the hunting grounds by cutting down its trees or digging out the soil.

A commentary on the Mishirushibumi, the Suwa Shichū (陬波私注 "Personal Notes on the Suwa Mishirusibumi," written 1313–1314), elaborates on the text by retelling the legend of Suwa Myōjin's consecration of his first priest:

The Daimyōjin was born during [the year/month/day of] the Yang Wood Horse and disappeared during [the year/month/day of] the Yang Wood Horse.
Sokutan Daijin (続旦大臣) was the Daimyōjin's uncle who accompanied him from India. When the Daimyōjin was to disappear, he took off his garments, put them on the Daijin, and dubbed him the Misogihōri (御衣木法理). He then pronounced a vow: "You shall consider this priest to be my body." (Note: 「一、大明神甲午_{仁}有御誕生甲午_{仁}隠御身給_{フ} 一、続旦（ソクタン）大臣ト申ハ大明神ノ叔父御前自_{リ}天竺御同道、大明神御体_{ヲ}隠_{サセ}給_{シ}時御装束ヲ奉抜著（ヌキキセ）彼大臣給テ号御衣木（ミソキ）法理ト 我之躰以法理ヲ躰トセヨトハ誓給_{シ}也」)

The same text identifies the god's uncle Sokutan Daijin with Arikazu. (Note: 「一、御衣木法理殿御実名_{ハ}者有員_{云〻}」)

==== Suwa Myōjin and the frog god ====
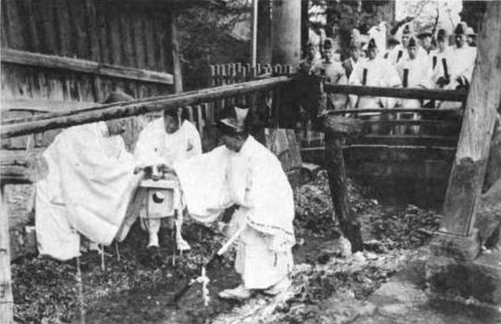
The Frog Hunting Ritual of Suwa Shrine (taken before 1937)

Two texts, the Monoimi no rei and the Suwa Shichū (陬波私注 "Personal Notes on the Suwa Mishirusibumi," written 1313–1314), mention an oral legend about Suwa Myōjin pacifying the waves of the four seas by subduing an unruly frog god.

Suwa (陬波) should be read as "the waves are calm." When a frog god (蝦蟆神), being a harmful god (荒神 kōjin), caused suffering to the realm, the Daimyōjin quelled it and came to reside here; [because] the four seas were calm, it is called Suwa. (Note: 「一、陬波_{ト}申事_{ナミシツカナリトヨメリ} 蝦蟆_{カニタ}神^{カエルノ事ナリ}荒神惱_{ト}天下時、大明神退治之御坐時 四海静謐之間 陬波_{卜云〻} 口傅在之」)

After defeating this frog, Suwa Myōjin then blocked the way to its dwelling - a hole leading to the underwater palace of the dragon god of the sea, the Ryūgū-jō - with a rock and sat on it.

This story functions as an etiological legend for the annual sacrifice of frogs held every New Year's Day in the Upper Shrine (see below) as well as yet another folk etymology for the toponym 'Suwa' (rendered here as 陬波), here explained as deriving either from a term for a wave lapping onto the sea's edge or a reference to the deity's pacification of the waters: "the waves are calm."

The portrayal of Suwa Myōjin's enemy as a frog also hints at the deity's character as a serpentine water god. (As a point of comparison, the obscure snake god Ugajin was also credited with defeating a malevolent frog deity.) The frog god itself has been interpreted either as representing the native deities Mishaguji and/or Moriya, with its defeat symbolizing the victory of the cult of Suwa Myōjin over the indigenous belief system, or as a symbol of the Buddhist concept of the three poisons (ignorance, greed, and hatred), which Suwa Myōjin, as an incarnation of the bodhisattva Samantabhadra, his esoteric aspect Vajrasattva and the Wisdom King Trailokyavijaya (interpreted as a manifestation of Vajrasattva), is said to destroy.

==== The dragon (serpent) deity of Suwa ====
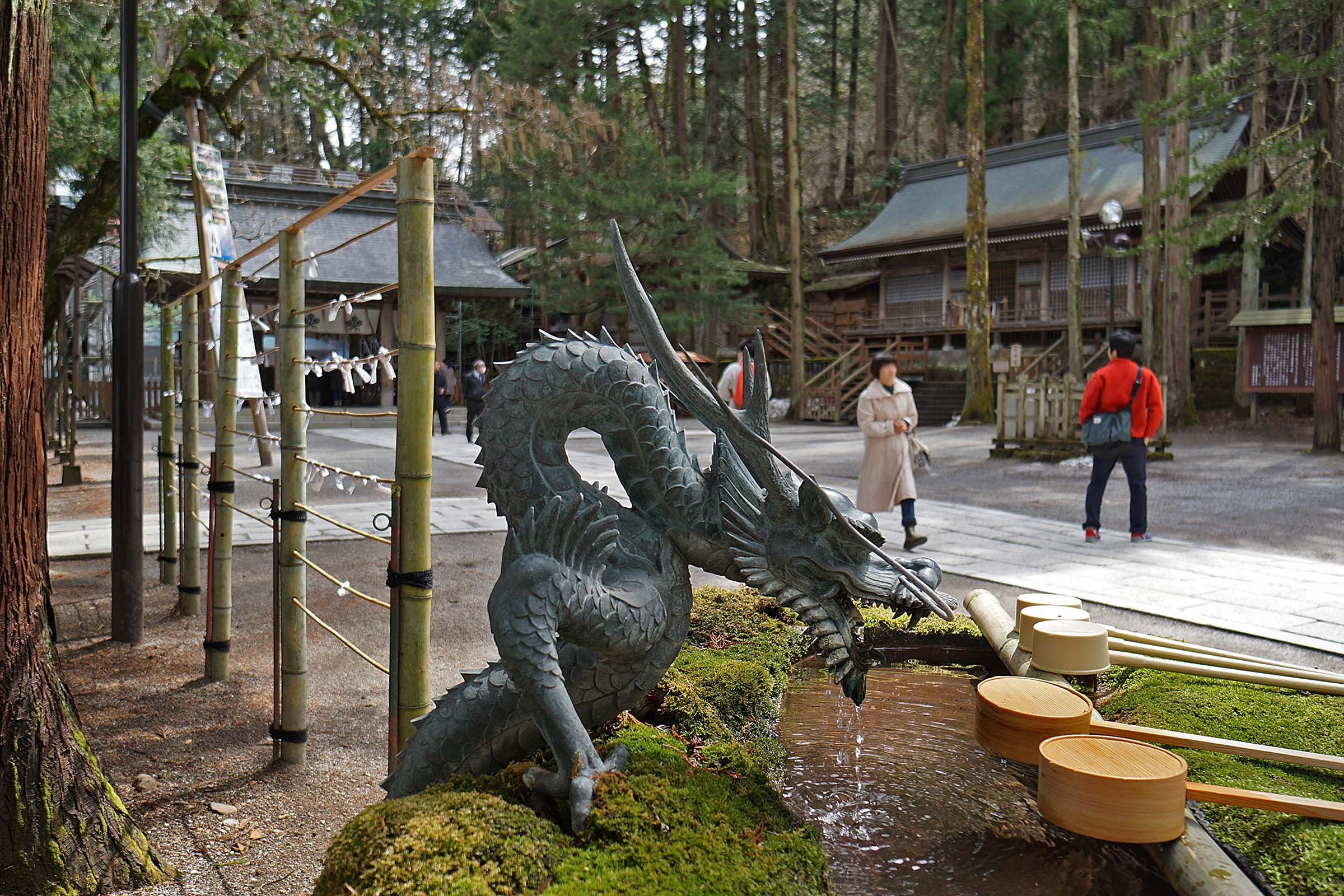
Chōzuya with a dragon-shaped spout, Kamisha Honmiya

Folk belief has long held the god of Suwa Shrine to assume the form of a serpent or dragon. Consequently, the deity appears as such in a number of folktales and anecdotes.

In one such story, Suwa Myōjin once came to Izumo Province in the form of a dragon so gigantic that only his head can be seen; his tail was still at Suwa, caught in a tall pine tree by the shores of the lake. The other gods, upon seeing him, were so astounded and frightened at his enormous size that they exempted him from attending their yearly meetings. Thus, the deity of Suwa is claimed to be one of the very few kami in Japan who do not leave their shrines during the month of Kannazuki, when most gods are thought to gather at Izumo and thus are absent from most of the country. The supposed tree where the dragon's tail was caught (currently reduced to a stump) is locally known as Okakematsu (尾掛松).

A variant of this story transposes the setting from Izumo to the Imperial Palace in Kyoto; in this version, the various kami are said to travel to the ancient capital every New Year's Day to greet the emperor.

Another popular story promulgated by wandering preachers associated with the shrines of Suwa during the medieval period claimed the Suwa deity to have originally been Kōga Saburō, a warrior who temporarily became a dragon or a snake after a journey into the underworld.

==== Omiwatari ====
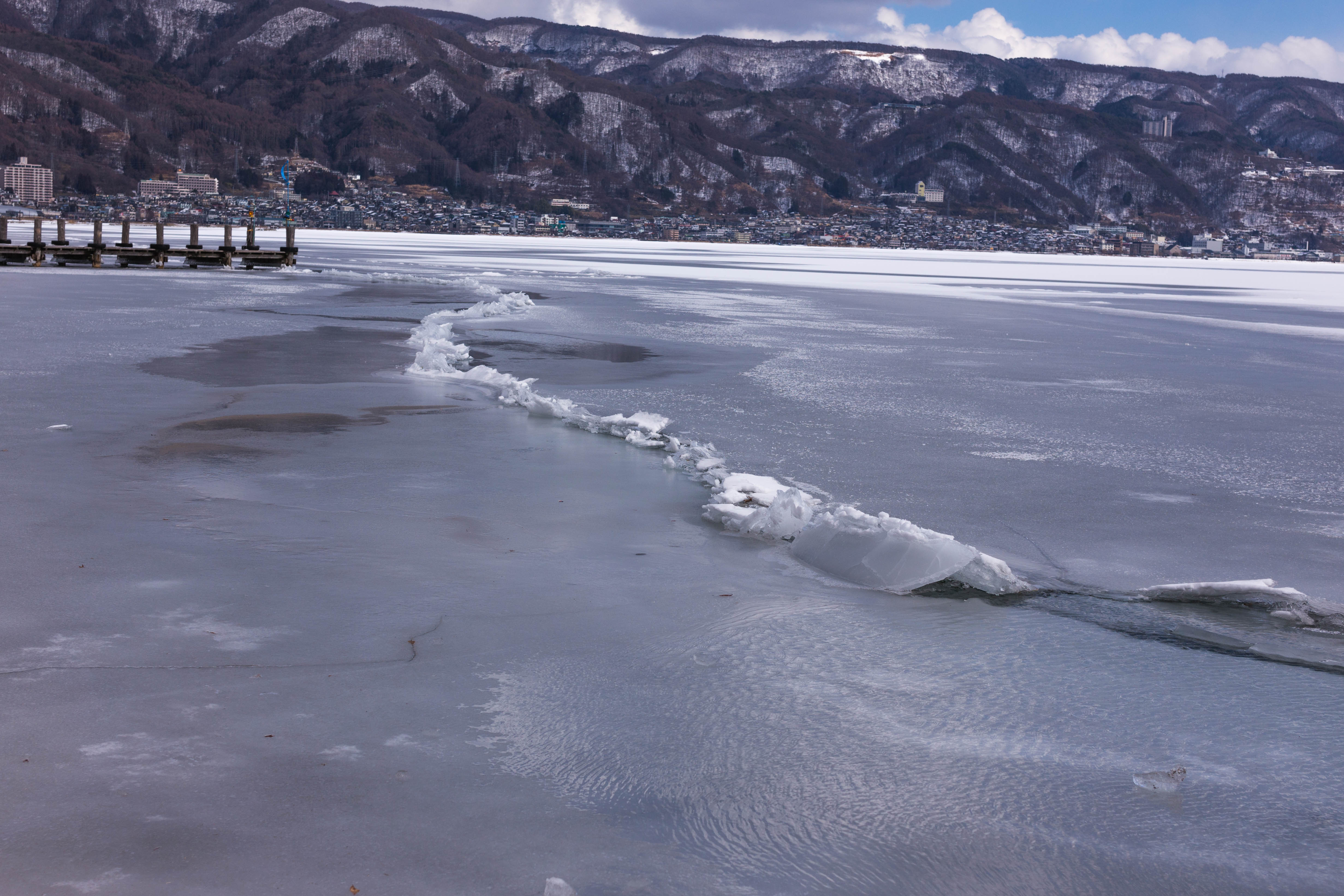
Omiwatari

Cracks and ridges that form on a frozen Lake Suwa during cold winters have traditionally been interpreted as the trail left behind by Suwa Myōjin as he leaves the Upper Shrine and crosses the lake to meet his wife enshrined on the Lower Shrine on the opposite (northern) shore. Called Omiwatari (御神渡 'the god's crossing' or 'the god's pathway'), the cracks were considered to be a good omen for the coming year. The priests of the Grand Shrine of Suwa traditionally used the crack's appearance to divine the quality of the year's harvest. For the locals, the crack also served as a sign that the frozen lake was safe to walk upon. Conversely, the omiwatari's failure to appear at all (明海 ake no umi) or the cracks forming in an unusual way were held to be a sign of bad luck for the year.

Since the late 20th century, the omiwatari has become a much rarer sight than it was in the past due to rising temperatures caused by global warming.

==== As god of war ====
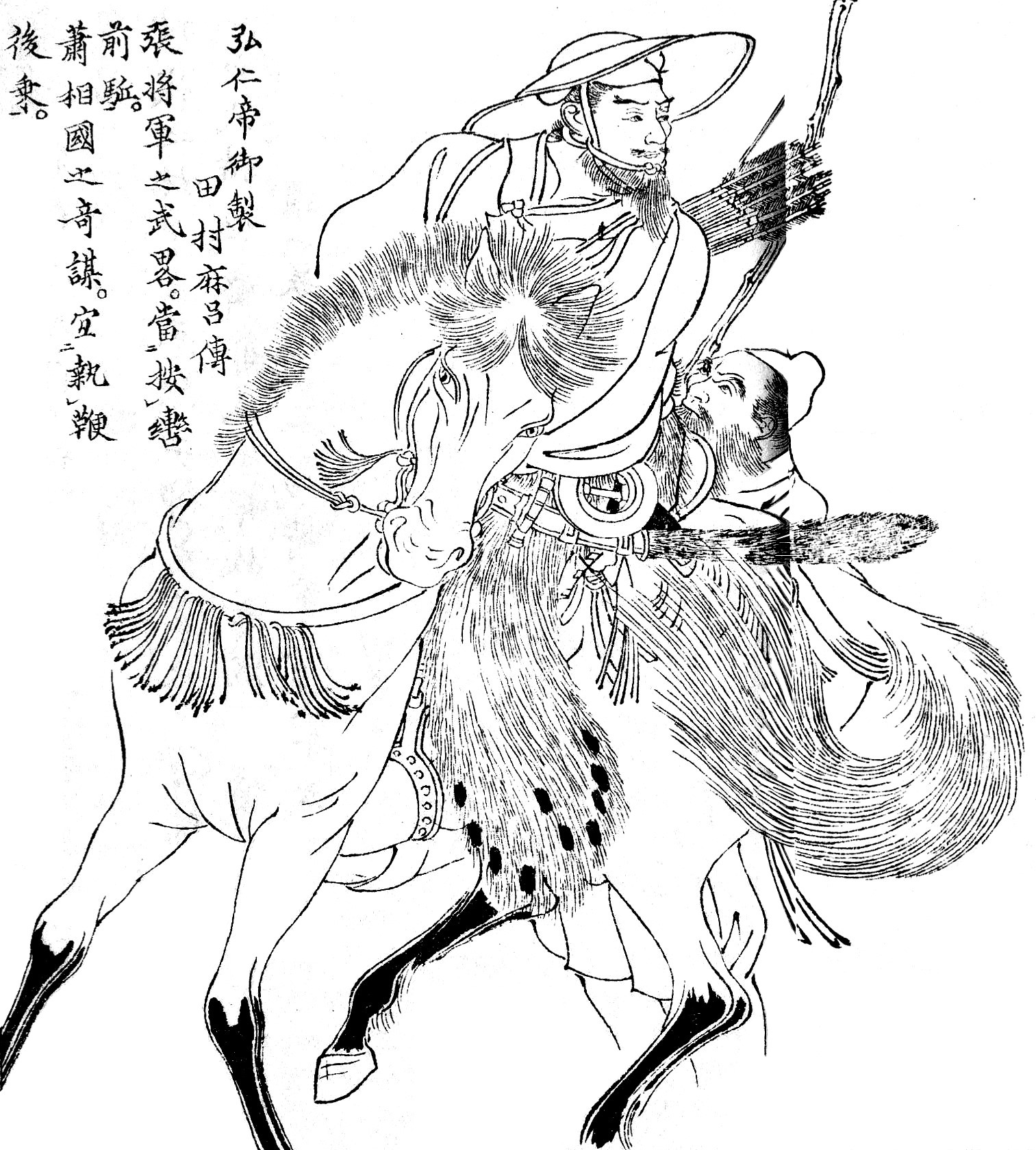
Sakanoue no Tamuramaro is credited with instituting the religious festivities of Suwa Shrine after the god of Suwa came to his aid against the Emishi peoples.

Suwa Myōjin is also considered to be a god of war, one of a number of such deities in the Japanese pantheon. The Ryōjin Hishō compiled in 1179 (the late Heian period) also attest to the worship of the god of Suwa in the capacity of god of warfare at the time of its compilation, naming the shrine of Suwa among famous shrines to martial deities in the eastern half of the country.

These gods of war live east of the barrier: (Note: During the Heian period, the expression 'east of the barrier' (関の東 seki-no-hi(n)gashi, whence derives the term 関東 Kantō) referred to the provinces beyond the checkpoints or barrier stations (関 seki) at the eastern fringes of the capital region, more specifically the land east of the checkpoint at Ōsaka/Ausaka Hill (逢坂 'hill of meeting', old orthography: Afusaka; not to be confused with the modern city of Osaka) in modern Ōtsu, Shiga Prefecture. By the Edo period, Kantō was reinterpreted to mean the region east of the checkpoint in Hakone, Kanagawa Prefecture.)
Kashima, Katori, Suwa no Miya, and Hira Myōjin;
also Su in Awa, Otaka Myōjin in Tai no Kuchi,
Yatsurugi in Atsuta, and Tado no Miya in Ise.

— Ryōjin Hishō, song 258 (Note: 「関より東(ひむかし)の軍神(いくさがみ)、鹿島・香取(かんどり)・諏訪の宮、また比良(ひら)の明神、安房の洲(す)滝(たい)の口や小鷹明神、熱田に八剣(やつるぎ)、伊勢には多度(たど)の宮。」)

During the medieval period, legends claiming Suwa Myōjin to have appeared and provided assistance to eminent figures such as Empress Jingū or the general Sakanoue no Tamuramaro during their respective military campaigns circulated.

The god of Suwa was also credited with the attempted Mongol invasions of Japan under Kublai Khan. The Taiheiki recounts a story where a five-colored cloud resembling a serpent (a manifestation of the god) rose up from Lake Suwa and spread away westward to assist the Japanese army against the Mongols.

On the seventh day, when the Imperial devotions were completed, from Lake Suwa there arose a cloud of many colours, in shape like a great serpent, which spread away towards the west. The doors of the Temple-treasury of Hachiman flew open, and the skies were filled with a sound of galloping horses and of ringing bits. In the twenty-one shrines of Yoshino the brocade-curtained mirrors moved, the swords of the Temple-treasury put on a sharp edge, and all the shoes offered to the god turned towards the west. At Sumiyoshi sweat poured from below the saddles of the four horses sacred to the deities, and the iron shields turned of themselves and faced the enemy in a line.

== Analysis ==
=== Takeminakata in the Kojiki ===
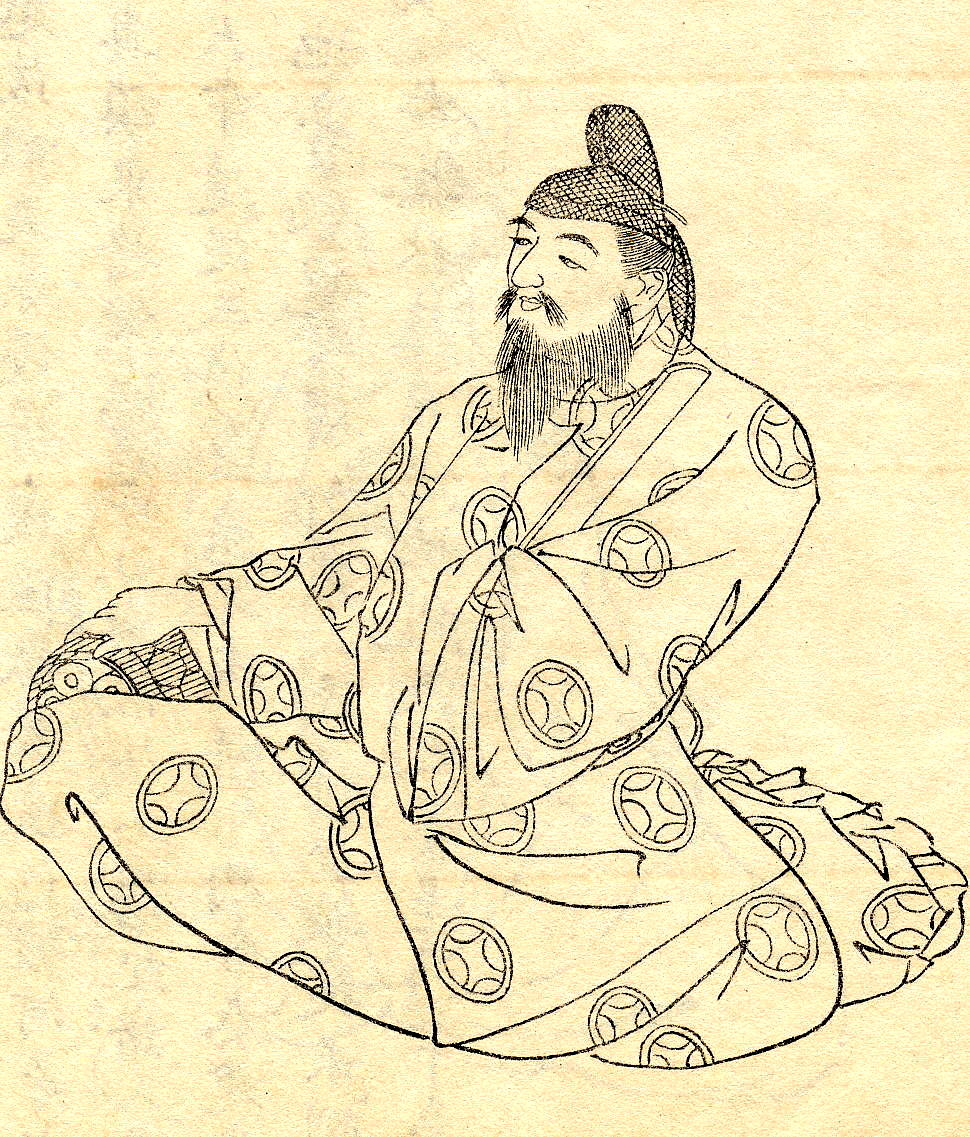
Ō no Yasumaro, the compiler of the Kojiki

Takeminakata's abrupt appearance in the Kojiki's version of the kuni-yuzuri myth has long puzzled scholars, as the god is mentioned nowhere else in the work, including the genealogy of Ōkuninushi's progeny that precedes the kuni-yuzuri narrative proper. Aside from the parallel account contained in the Kuji Hongi (which was itself based on the Kojiki), he is altogether absent from the Nihon Shoki's version of the myth. Early documents from Izumo such as the province's Fudoki also fail to mention any god named '(Take)minakata', nor is there apparently any sign of Takeminakata worship in Izumo in antiquity.

Pre-modern authors such as Motoori Norinaga tended to explain Takeminakata's absence outside of the Kojiki and the Kuji Hongi by conflating the god with certain obscure deities found in other sources thought to share certain similar characteristics (e.g. Isetsuhiko). While a few modern scholars still suppose some kind of indirect connection between the deity and Izumo by postulating that Takeminakata's origins lie either in peoples that migrated from Izumo northwards to Suwa and the Hokuriku region or in Hokuriku itself (the ancient province of Koshi, a region apparently once under Izumo's sphere of influence as can be inferred from the myth of Ōkuninushi's marriage to Nunakawahime), others instead propose that the connection between Takeminakata and Izumo is an artificial construct by the Kojiki's compilers.

The contest between Takeminakata and Takemikazuchi - an element absent in other versions of the kuni-yuzuri myth cycle - is often explained as being either a new myth invented to serve the interests of the imperial court and the Fujiwara clan, descendants of the Nakatomi clan that had worshiped Takemikazuchi as a patron deity (indeed, in other versions it is the god Futsunushi that takes center stage rather than Takemikazuchi, who is believed to have taken on Futsunushi's roles and attributes after the Nakatomi rose to power), or an adaptation/reversal of a myth concerning a battle between an interloping god and a local deity preserved in the Suwa region (see below), with Takeminakata (the invading conqueror in Suwa myth) being recast into the role of the subjugated earthly kami.

=== Suwa Myōjin and Moriya ===
The myth of Takeminakata's (Suwa Myōjin's) arrival in Suwa and his defeat of the god Moriya has been interpreted as the mythicization of a historical event in which a local lineage of chieftains who ruled the Suwa area was subjugated by invading outsiders, who subsequently set themselves up as the new rulers of the region - all the while still retaining the subjugated clan in an important position as the wielder of spiritual and ritual authority. This theory explains the relation between the Suwa (Miwa/Jin) and Moriya priestly families of the Upper Shrine of Suwa as that of the Moriya clan being the regional power supplanted by the newly arrived Miwa (Suwa) clan.

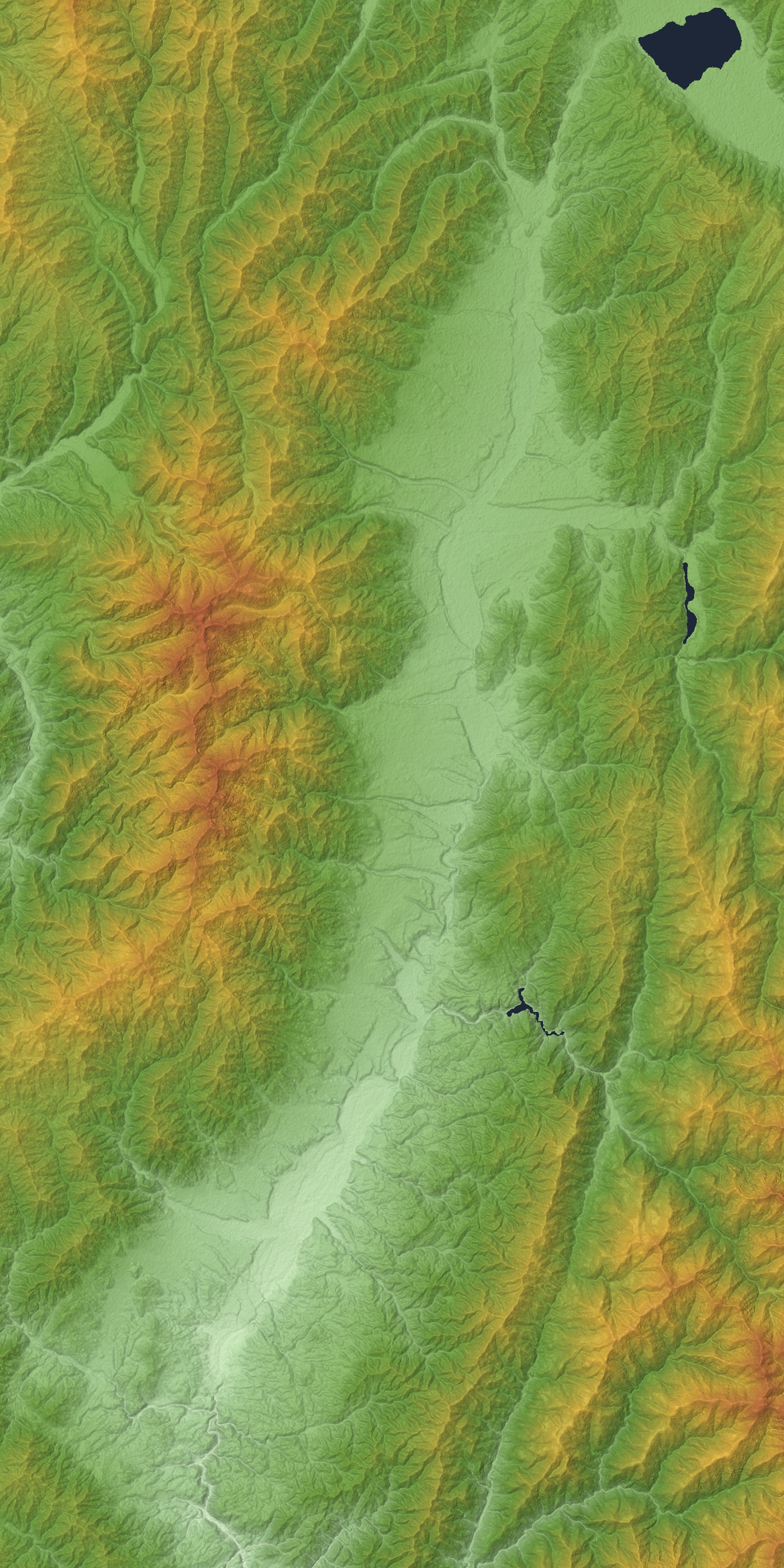
Relief map of the Ina Valley. Lake Suwa can be seen at top right.

While one theory places this event during the end of the Jōmon period, thus portraying the new arrivals as agrarian Yayoi tribes who came into conflict with indigenous Jōmon hunter-gatherers, others instead propose this conflict to have taken place during the late Kofun period (late 6th-early 7th century), when keyhole-shaped burial mounds containing equestrian gear as grave goods - up to this point found mainly in the Shimoina region southwest of Suwa - begin to appear in the Lake Suwa area, replacing the kind of burial that had been common in the region since the early 5th century. This theory thus supposes these migrants to have been a clan allied with the Yamato kingdom that specialized in horse breeding and horseback riding. Indeed, the Yamato polity showed strong interest to Shinano because of its suitability as a place for grazing and breeding horses and considered it a strategic base for conquering the eastern regions. This clan, the Miwa (Suwa), is thought to be related to either the Kanasashi clan (金刺氏), an offshoot of a local magnate clan (kuni no miyatsuko) that later became the high priestly family of the Lower Shrine of Suwa, or the Miwa (Ōmiwa) clan (三輪氏) originally based on the area around Mount Miwa in Yamato Province. The theory suggests based on archaeological evidence that the Miwa (Suwa) came to the Suwa Basin from Shimoina, making their way northwards along the Tenryū River. In conjunction with this hypothesis, it is pointed out that in the Nobushige Gejō (believed to be the earliest attestation of this myth), the Suwa deity is said to have descended from heaven bringing with him bells, a mirror, a saddle and a bridle.

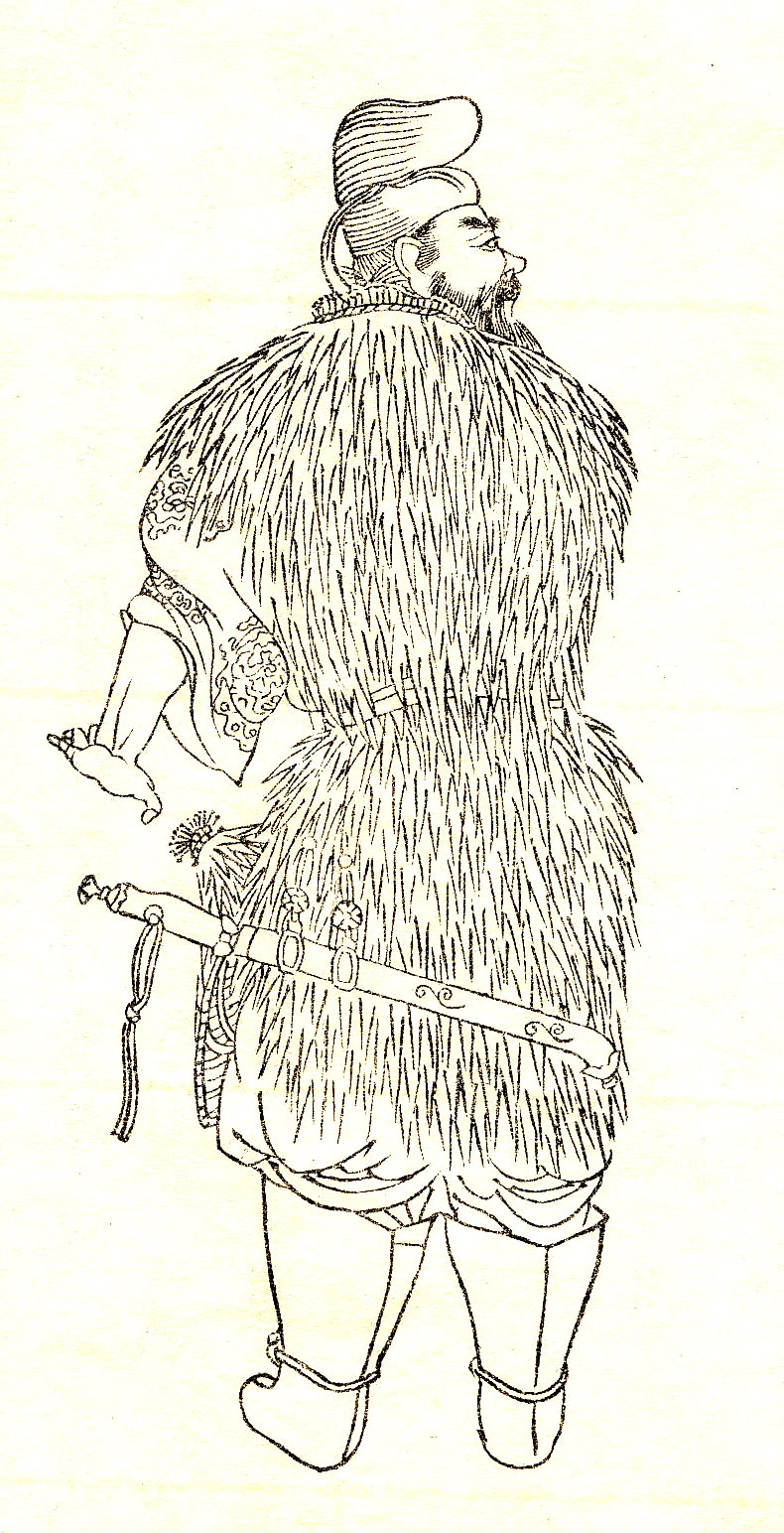
Mononobe no Moriya

This theory that the legend of the Suwa deity's victory over Moriya reflects historical fact has recently come into question. Due to similarities between certain variants of this myth and medieval legends surrounding Prince Shōtoku's defeat of Mononobe no Moriya (e.g. Shōtoku's and Suwa Myōjin's opponents both being named 'Moriya', the deity's manifestation and the foundation of the Upper Shrine being dated to the year 587 - the same year as the battle between the Soga and the Mononobe clans - in some texts), some see the myth as being highly influenced by such stories about Shōtoku (so Ihara, 2008), while others regard it as an outright invention modeled on these legends (Harada, 2018). Aoki (2012) theorizes that the myth developed somewhere during the late Heian and early Kamakura periods, when the deity of Suwa came to be venerated as a warrior god, and cautions against uncritical application of this story to known archaeological data.

=== Takeminakata in imperial sources ===
While the Kojiki does not yet explicitly mention the worship of Takeminakata in Suwa, by the following century, we see the name applied to the god worshipped in what is now the Grand Shrine of Suwa: aside from the Kuji Hongi's (807-936 CE) reference to Takeminakata being enshrined in 'Suwa Shrine in Suwa District' the Shoku Nihon Kōki mentions the deity 'Minakatatomi-no-Kami of Suwa District, Shinano Province' (信濃国諏訪郡 ... 南方刀美神) being promoted from rankless (无位) to junior fifth rank, lower grade (従五位下) by the imperial court in the year 842 CE (Jōwa 9). (Note: 「丁未。奉授信濃國諏方郡无位勳八等南方刀美神從五位下。」)

During the 850-60s, Takeminakata and his shrine rose very rapidly in rank (Montoku Jitsuroku, Nihon Sandai Jitsuroku), being promoted to the rank of junior fifth, upper grade (従五位上) in 850 (Kashō 3), (Note: 「己未。信濃國御名方富命神、健御名方富命前八坂刀賣命神、並加從五位上。」) to junior third (従三位) in 851 (Ninju 1), (Note: 「乙丑。進信濃國建御名方富命、前八坂刀賣命等兩大神階、加從三位。」) to junior (従二位) (Note: 「廿七日甲申。 (...) 信濃國正三位勳八等建御名方冨命神從二位。」) and then senior second (正二位) (Note: 「十一日丁酉。(...) 授信濃國從二位勳八等建御名方富命神正二位。」) in 859 (Jōgan 1), and finally to junior first rank (従一位) in 867 (Jōgan 9). (Note: 「十一日辛亥。信濃國正二位勳八等建御名方富命神進階從一位。」) The influence of the Kanasashi-no-toneri clan is thought to be behind the deity's sudden progress in rank.

After a few decades, the 'Register of Deities' (神名帳 Jinmyōchō) section of the Engishiki (927) speaks of the 'Minakatatomi Shrine(s)' (南方刀美神社) as enshrining two deities and being the two major ('eminent') shrines of Suwa district. (Note: 「諏方郡_{二座 並大} 南方刀美神社_{二座 名神大}」) By 940 (Tengyō 3), the deity had been promoted to the highest rank of senior first (正一位).

== Consort and Offspring ==
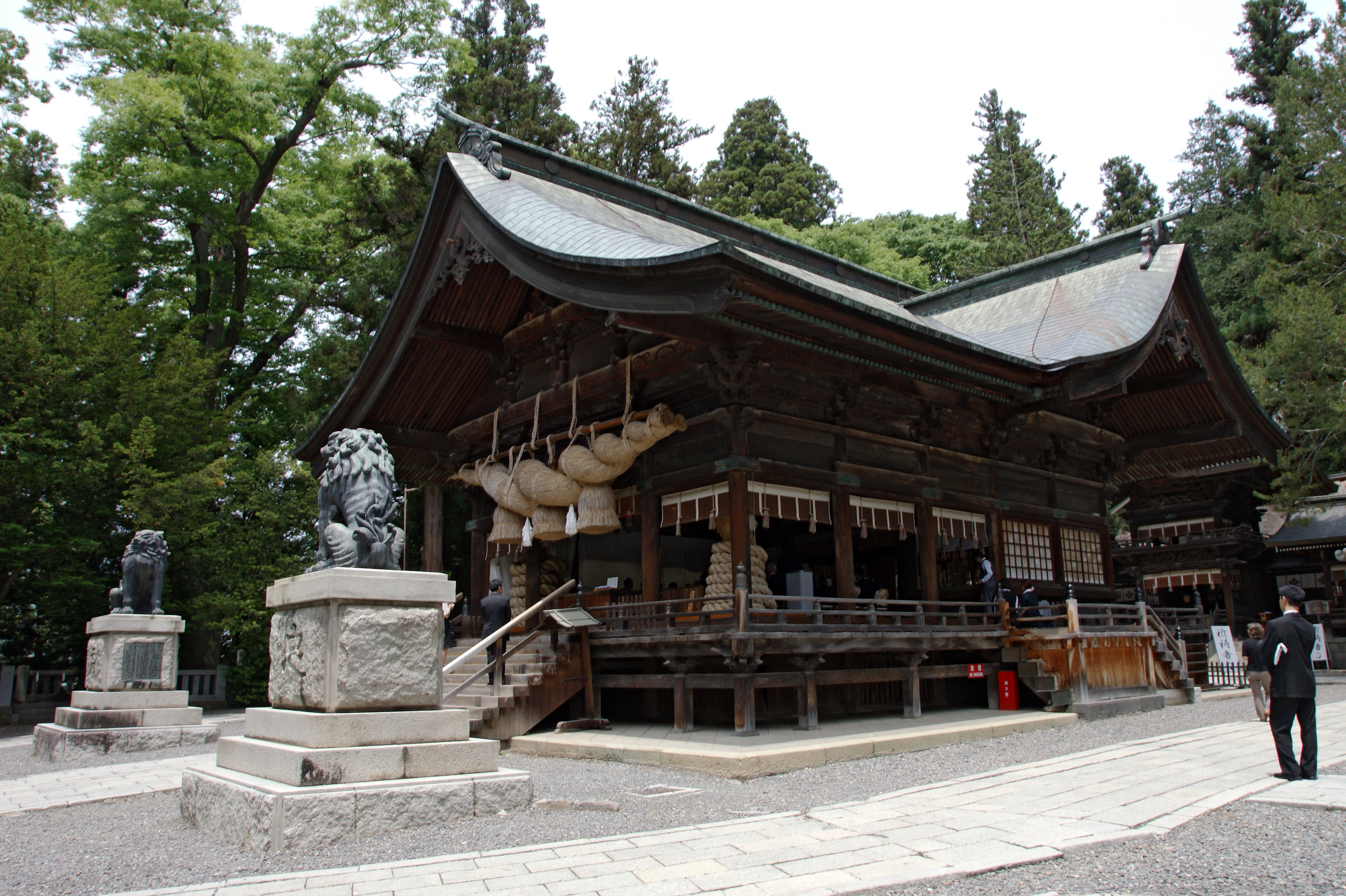
The Akimiya (秋宮) or Autumn Shrine, one of the two component shrines of the Suwa Shimosha

=== Yasakatome ===
Suwa Myōjin's spouse is the goddess Yasakatome-no-Kami (八坂刀売神), most often considered to be the deity of the Lower Shrine of Suwa or the Shimosha. Unlike the relatively well-documented Suwa Kamisha, very little concrete information is available regarding the origins of the Shimosha and its goddess.

Yasakatome's first historical attestation is in the Shoku Nihon Kōki, where the goddess is given the rank of junior fifth, lower grade (従五位下) by the imperial court in the tenth month of Jōwa 9 (842 CE), five months after the same rank was conferred on Takeminakata. (Note: 「奉授安房國從五位下安房大神正五位下。无位第一后神天比理刀咩命神。信濃國无位健御名方富命前八坂刀賣神。阿波國无位葦稻葉神。越後國无位伊夜比古神。常陸國无位筑波女大神竝從五位下。」) As Takeminakata rose up in rank, so did Yasakatome, so that by 867 CE, Yasakatome had been promoted to senior second (正二位). The goddess was finally promoted to senior first rank (正一位) in 1074 (Jōhō 1).

Stories and claims about the goddess are diverse and contradictory. Regarding her parentage for instance, the lore of Kawaai Shrine (川会神社) in Kitaazumi District identifies Yasakatome as the daughter of Watatsumi, god of the sea, which has been seen as hinting to a connection between the goddess and the seafaring Azumi clan (安曇氏). Another claim originating from sources dating from the Edo period is that Yasakatome was the daughter of Ame-no-yasakahiko (天八坂彦命), a god recorded in the Kuji Hongi as one of the companions of Nigihayahi-no-Mikoto when the latter came down from heaven.

The ice cracks that appear on Lake Suwa during cold winters, the omiwatari (see above) are reputed in folklore to be caused by Suwa Myōjin's crossing the frozen lake to visit Yasakatome.

==== Princess Kasuga ====
The Kōga Saburō legend identifies the goddess of the Shimosha with Saburō's wife, whose name is given in some variants of the story as 'Princess Kasuga' (春日姫 Kasuga-hime).

=== Children ===
In Suwa, a number of local deities are popularly considered to be the children of Suwa Myōjin and his consort. Ōta (1926) lists the following gods:

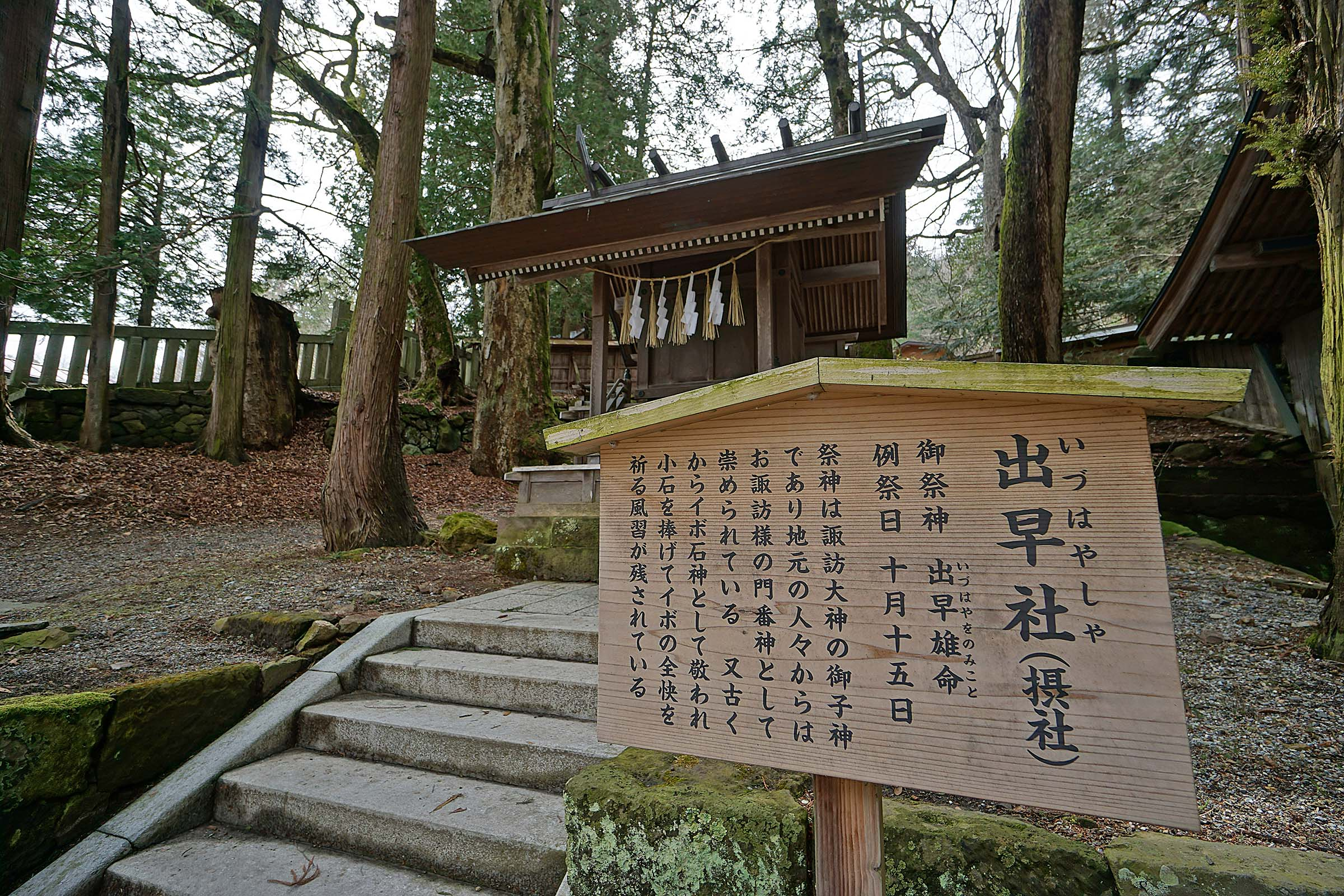
Izuhaya-sha (出早社), an auxiliary shrine in the Kamisha Honmiya dedicated to the god Izuhayao (出早雄命), believed to be one of Suwa Myōjin's offspring

- Hikokamiwake-no-Mikoto (彦神別命)
- Tatsuwakahime-no-Kami (多都若姫神)
- Taruhime-no-Kami (多留姫神)
- Izuhayao-no-Mikoto (伊豆早雄命)
- Tateshina-no-Kami (建志名神)
- Tsumashinahime-no-Kami (妻科姫神)
- Ikeno'o-no-Kami (池生神)
- Tsumayamizuhime-no-mMikoto (都麻屋美豆姫命)
- Yakine-no-Mikoto (八杵命)
- Suwa-wakahiko-no-Mikoto (洲羽若彦命)
- Katakurabe-no-Mikoto (片倉辺命)
- Okihagi-no-Mikoto (興波岐命)
- Wakemizuhiko-no-Mikoto (別水彦命)
- Moritatsu-no-Kami (守達神)
- Takamori-no-kami (高杜神)
- Enatakemimi-no-Mikoto (恵奈武耳命)
- Okutsuiwatate-no-Kami (奥津石建神)
- Ohotsuno-no-Kami (竟富角神)
- Ōkunugi-no-Kami (大橡神)

=== Claimed descendants ===
==== Suwa clan ====
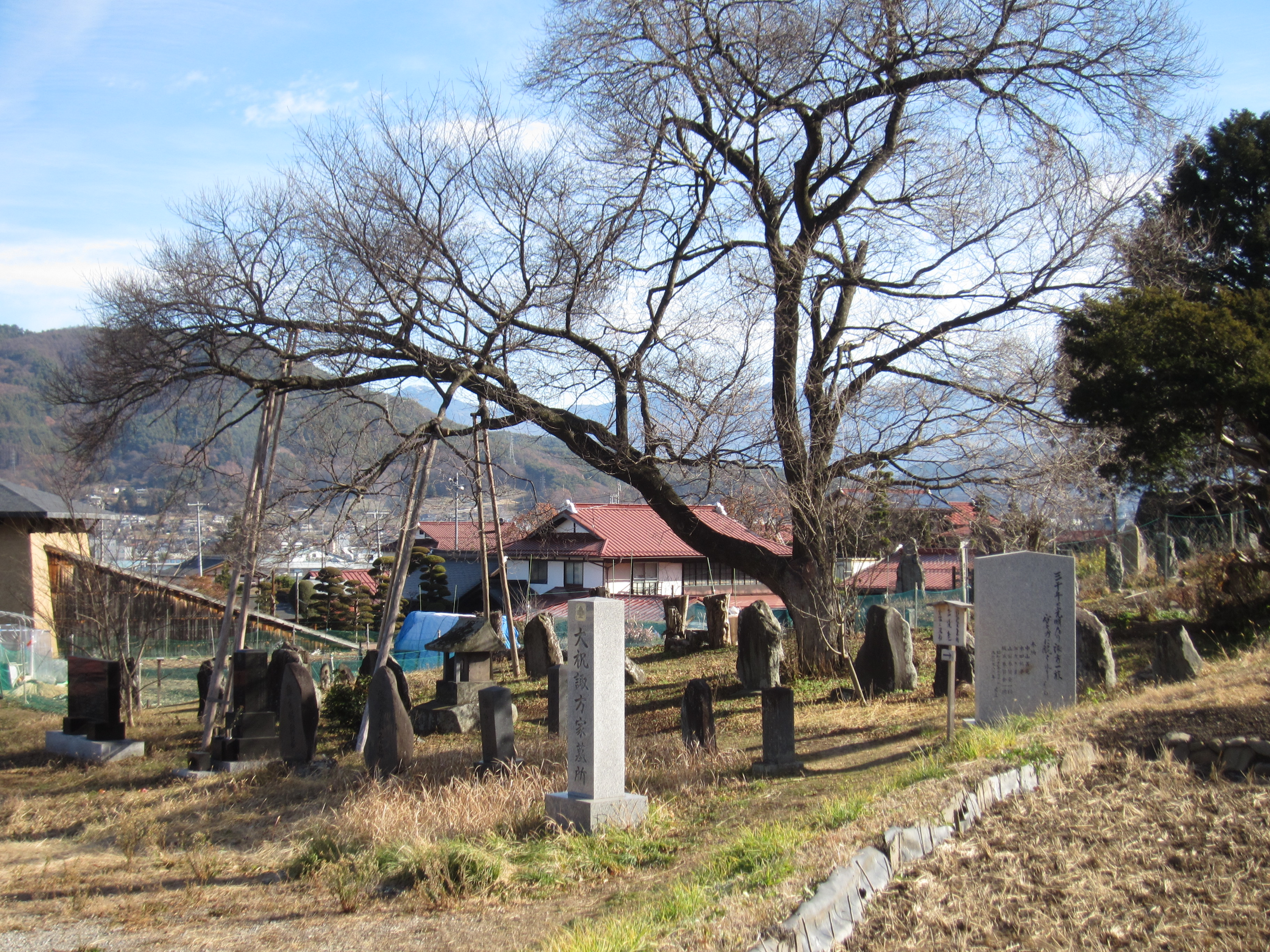
The graves of various Suwa ōhōri within the historical estate grounds of the Moriya clan in Chino, Nagano. Both the Jinchōkan Moriya Historical Museum and the head Mishaguji shrine (sōsha) are located in the same precincts.

The Suwa clan who once occupied the position of head priest or ōhōri of the Suwa Kamisha traditionally considered themselves to be descendants of Suwa Myōjin/Takeminakata, although historically they are probably descended from the Kanasashi-no-toneri clan appointed by the Yamato court to govern the Suwa area in the 6th century (see above).

==== Other clans ====
The Suwa ōhōri was assisted by five priests, some of whom were also considered to be descendants of local deities related to Suwa Myōjin/Takeminakata. One clan, the Koide (小出氏), the original occupants of the offices of negi-dayū (禰宜大夫) and gi-no-hōri (擬祝), claimed descent from the god Yakine. A second clan, the Yajima (八島(嶋)氏 or 矢島氏), which served as gon-no-hōri (権祝), considered the god Ikeno'o to be their ancestor.

== Worship ==
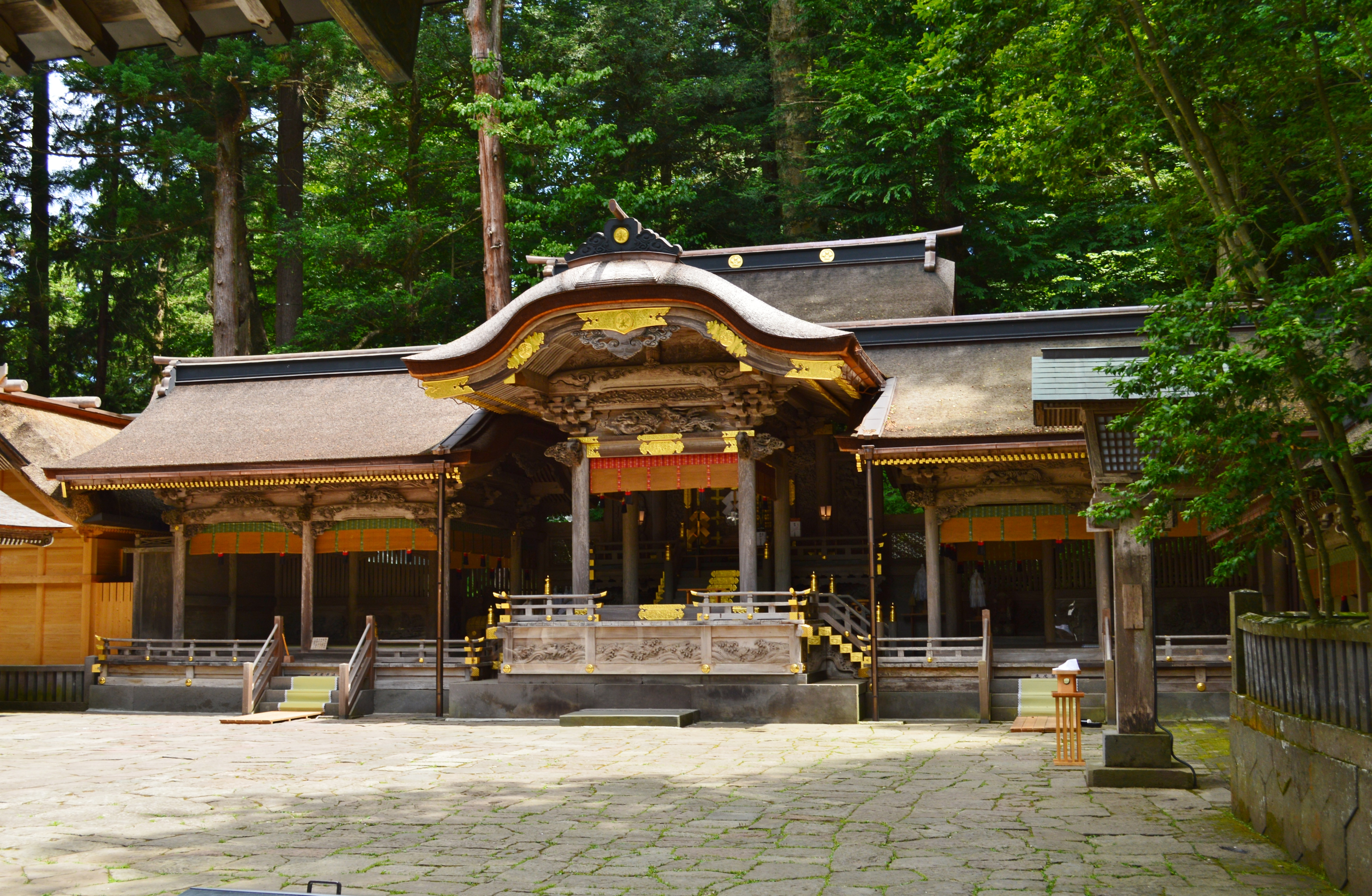
The main shrine or Honmiya (本宮) of the Upper Shrine (上社, Kamisha) of Suwa, one of the two main sites that make up Suwa Grand Shrine. Takeminakata is enshrined in the Upper Shrine located southeast of Lake Suwa, while his consort Yasakatome is worshiped on the Lower Shrine (下社, Shimosha) on the other (northwest) side of the lake.

=== Shrines ===
As the gods of the Grand Shrine of Suwa, Suwa Myōjin/Takeminakata and Yasakatome also serve as the deities of shrines belonging to the Suwa shrine network (諏訪神社 Suwa-jinja) all over Japan.

=== As god of wind and water ===
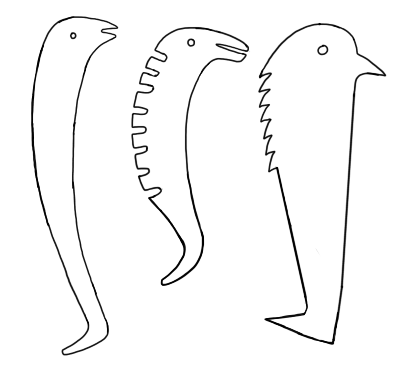
Nagikama

The Nihon Shoki's record of Yamato emissaries worshipping the god of Suwa alongside the gods of Tatsuta Shrine - worshipped for their power to control and ward off wind-related disasters such as droughts and typhoons - implies that the Yamato imperial court recognized the deity as a god of wind and water during the late 7th century. One theory regarding the origin of the name '(Take)minakata' even supposes it to derive from a word denoting a body of water (水潟 minakata; see above).

Snake-shaped iron sickle blades called nagikama (薙鎌) were traditionally used in the Suwa region to ward off strong winds, typhoons and other natural disasters; it was once customary for nagikama to be attached to wooden staves and placed on one corner of the rooftop of the house during the autumn typhoon season. Nagikama are also traditionally hammered onto the trees chosen to become the onbashira of the Suwa Kamisha and Shimosha some time before these are actually felled. In addition to these and other uses, the blades are also distributed to function as shintai for branch shrines of the Suwa shrine network.

=== Association with snakes and dragons ===
Suwa Myōjin's association with the snake or the dragon in many stories featuring the god such as the Kōga Saburō legend (see 'Legends of Suwa Myōjin' above) might be related to his being considered as a deity presiding over wind and water, due to the association of dragons with winds and the rain in Japanese belief. (See also mizuchi.)

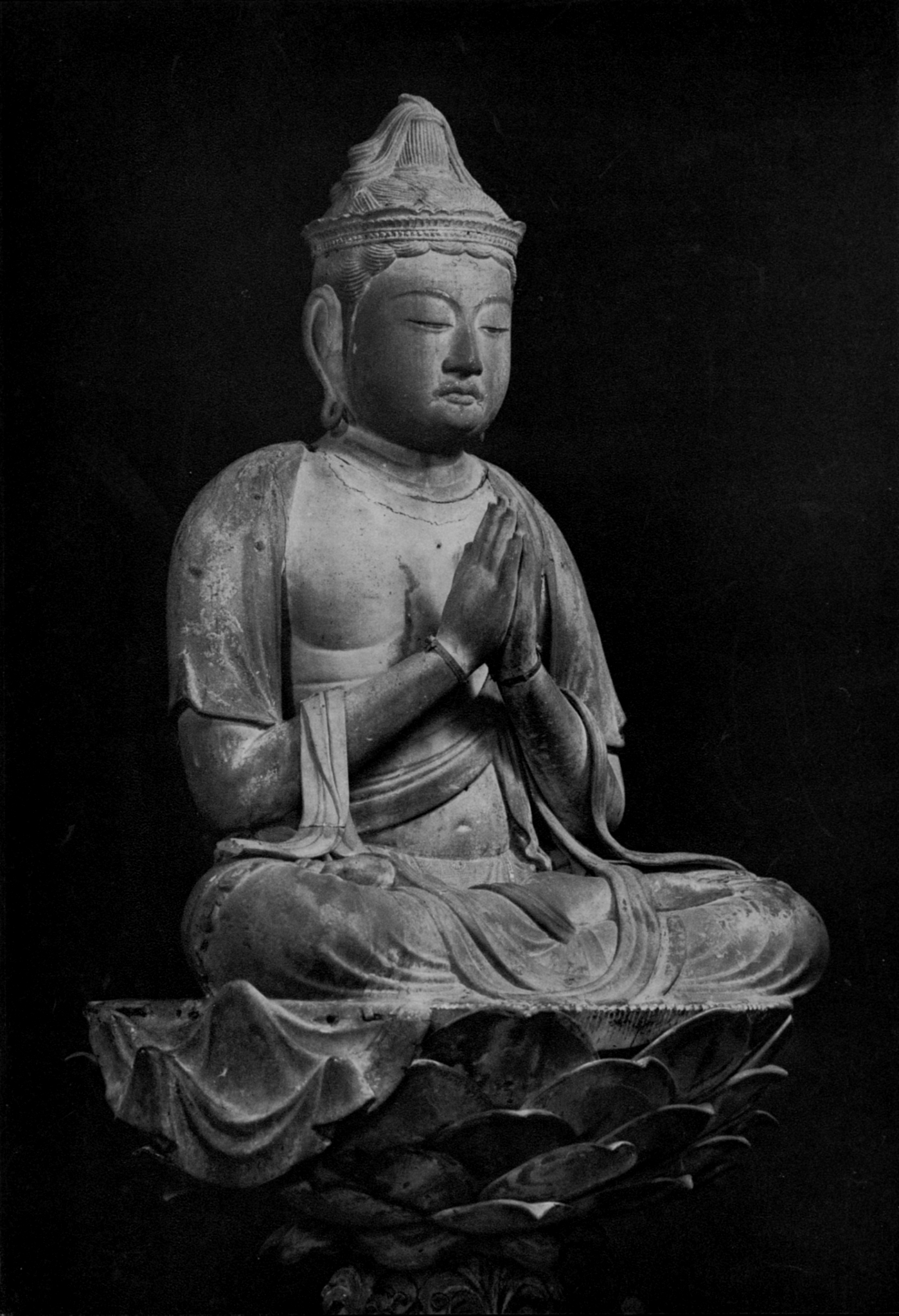
Suwa Myōjin was once believed to be a manifestation (suijaku) of the bodhisattva Samantabhadra.

=== Under shinbutsu-shūgō ===
During the Middle Ages, under the then-prevalent synthesis of Buddhism and Shinto, Suwa Myōjin was identified with the bodhisattva Samantabhadra (Fugen), with the goddess of the Shimosha being associated with the thousand-armed form of the bodhisattva Avalokiteśvara (Senju Kannon). During the medieval period, Buddhist temples and other edifices were erected on the precincts of both shrines, including a stone pagoda called the Tettō (鉄塔 "iron tower") - symbolizing the legendary iron tower in India where, according to Shingon tradition, Nagarjuna was said to have received esoteric teachings from Vajrasattva (who is sometimes identified with Samantabhadra) - and a sanctuary to Samantabhadra (普賢堂 Fugendō), both of which served at the time as the Kamisha's main objects of worship.

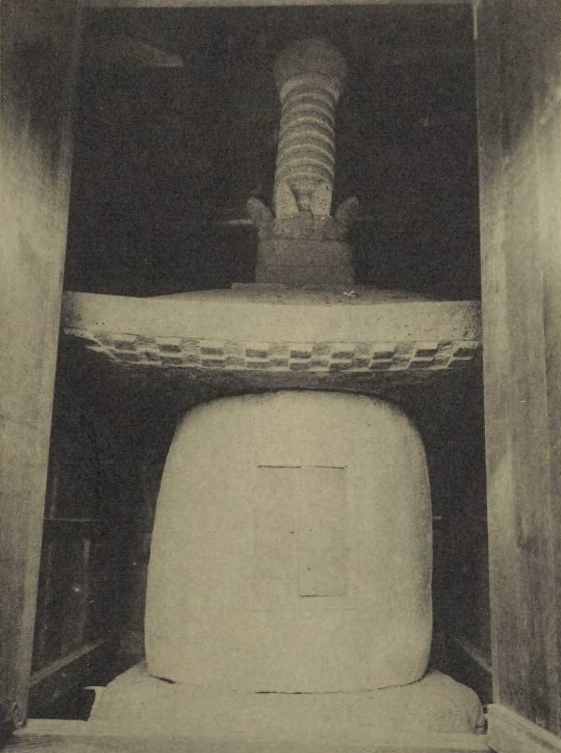
The Kamisha Honmiya's Iron Tower or Tettō photographed during the early 20th century. After the removal or demolition of Buddhist structures in Suwa Shrine following the separation of Buddhism and Shinto, this pagoda was moved to Onsenji Temple (温泉寺) in Suwa City, where it currently resides.

With the establishment of State Shinto after the Meiji Restoration in 1868 and the subsequent separation of Buddhism and Shinto, the shrine monks (shasō) attached to Buddhist temples in the Suwa shrine complex were laicized, with Buddhist symbols and structures being either removed or destroyed; Buddhist ceremonies performed in both the Kamisha and the Shimosha, such as the yearly offering of the Lotus Sutra to Suwa Myōjin (involving the placing of a copy of the sutra inside the Tettō), were discontinued.

=== As god of hunting ===
Suwa Myōjin is also worshipped as a god of hunting; not surprisingly, some of the Kamisha's religious ceremonies traditionally involve(d) ritual hunting and/or animal sacrifice.

For instance, the Frog Hunting Ritual (蛙狩神事 kawazugari shinji) held every New Year's Day involves the shooting (or rather, piercing) of frogs captured from a sacred river or stream within the Kamisha's precincts with miniature arrows. This ritual - which has come under harsh criticism from local activists and animal rights groups for its perceived cruelty to the frogs involved - was traditionally performed to secure peace and a bountiful harvest for the coming year.

Another festival, the Ontōsai (御頭祭) or the Tori no matsuri (酉の祭, so called because it was formerly held on the Day of the Rooster) currently held every April 15, feature the offering of seventy-five stuffed deer heads (a substitute for freshly cut heads of deer used in the past), as well as the consumption of venison and other game such as wild boar or rabbit, various kinds of seafood and other foodstuffs by the priests and other participants in a ritual banquet.

One of the Suwa Kamisha's hunting festivals, the Misayama Festival (御射山祭), formerly held in a field - the kōya (神野 'the god's plain') - at the foot of the Yatsugatake Mountains for five days (from the 26th to the 30th of the seventh month), (Note: Currently three days: from the 26th to the 28th of August.) was one of the grandest festivals in Suwa during the Kamakura period, attracting many of the samurai class from all across Japan who engaged in displays of mounted archery, bouts of sumo wrestling and falconry as part of the festivities, as well as people from all walks of life. The Shimosha also held its own Misayama Festival at the same time as the Kamisha (albeit in a different location), in which various warrior clans also participated.

Suwa Myōjin's association with the mountains and hunting is also evident from the description of the ōhōri as sitting upon a deer hide (the deer being an animal thought to be sacred to Suwa Myōjin) during the Ontōsai ritual as practiced during medieval times.

==== Suwa Myōjin and meat eating ====
At a time when slaughter of animals and consumption of meat was frowned upon due to Mahayana Buddhism's strict views on vegetarianism and the general Buddhist opposition against the taking of life, the cult of Suwa Myōjin was a unique feature in the Japanese religious landscape for its celebration of hunting and meat eating.

A four-line verse attached to the Kōga Saburō legend popularly known as the Suwa no kanmon (諏訪の勘文) encapsulates the justification of meat eating within a Buddhist framework: by being eaten by humans and 'dwelling' inside their bodies, ignorant animals could achieve enlightenment together with their human consumers.

業尽有情 Gōjin ujō
雖放不生 Suihō fushō
故宿人天 Koshuku ninten
同証仏果 Dōshō bukka

Sentient beings who have exhausted their karma:
Even if one sets (them) free, (they) will not live (for long);
Therefore (have them) dwell within humans and gods
(That they may) as well achieve Buddhahood

The Kamisha produced special talismans (鹿食免 kajiki-men "permit to eat venison") and chopsticks (鹿食箸 kajiki-bashi) that were held to allow the bearer to eat meat. Since it was the only one of its kind in Japan, the talisman was popular among hunters and meat eaters. These sacred licenses and chopsticks were distributed to the public both by the priests of the Kamisha as well as wandering preachers associated with the shrine known as oshi (御師), who preached the tale of Suwa Myōjin as Kōga Saburō as well as other stories concerning the god and his benefits.

=== As war god ===
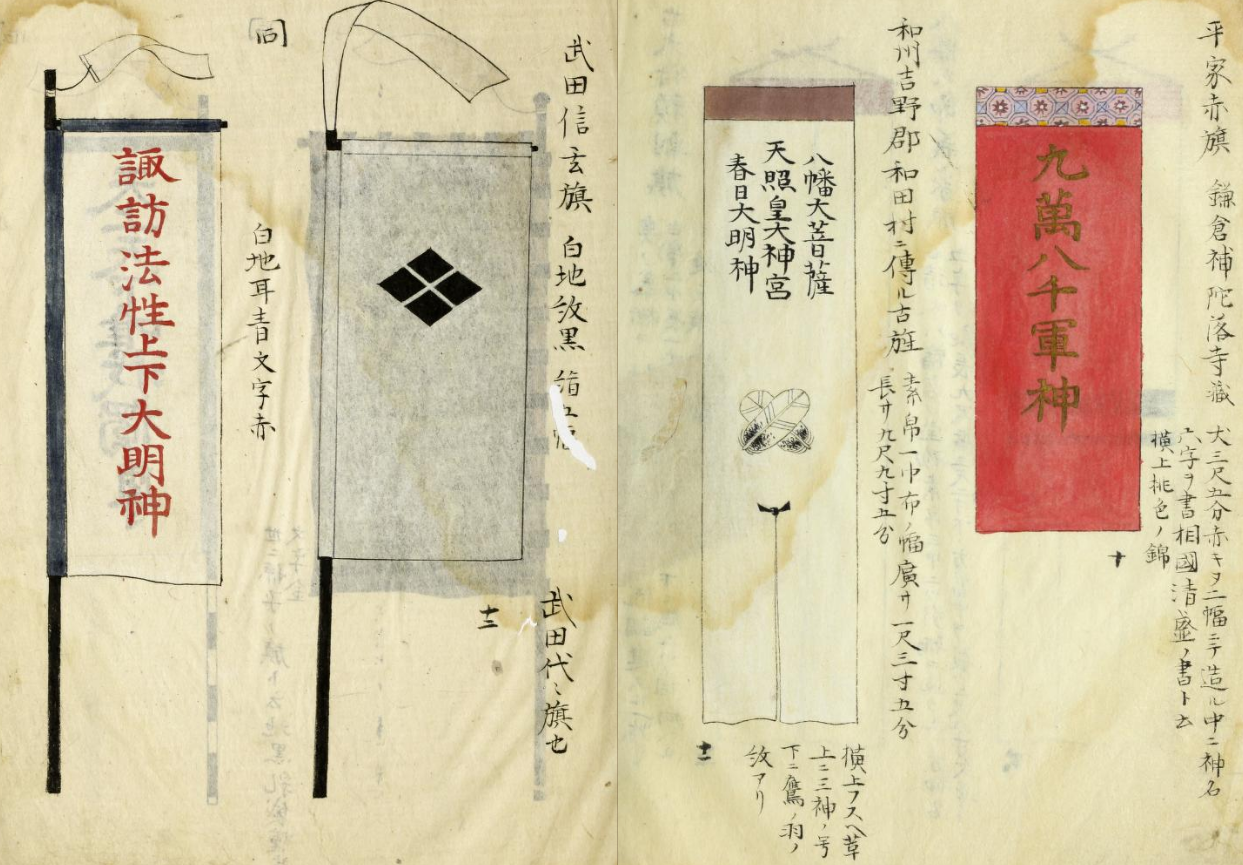
A depiction of war banners used by the Taira clan (right) and Takeda Shingen (left). The leftmost banner (white with blue border and red lettering) carries the inscription Suwa hosshō-kamishimo-daimyōjin (諏訪法性上下大明神).

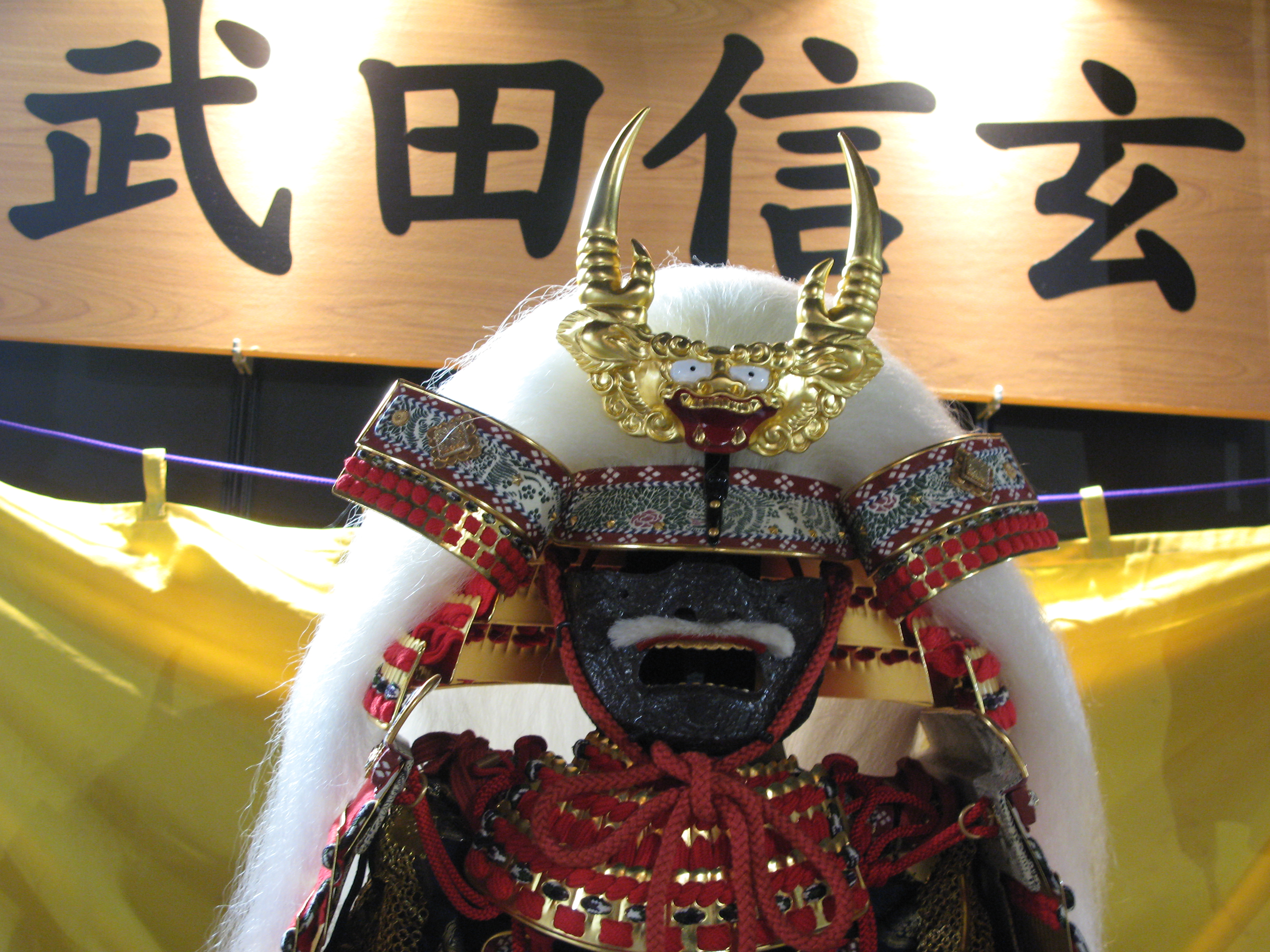
A modern reproduction of Takeda Shingen's helmet

Suwa Myōjin is also considered to be a god of war, one of a number of such deities in the Japanese pantheon. Besides the legend of the god's apparition to Sakanoue no Tamuramaro (see above), the Ryōjin Hishō compiled in 1179 (the late Heian period) also attest to the worship of the god of Suwa in the capacity of god of warfare at the time of its compilation, naming the shrine of Suwa among famous shrines to martial deities in the eastern half of the country.

These gods of war live east of the barrier: (Note: During the Heian period, the expression 'east of the barrier' (関の東 seki-no-hi(n)gashi, whence derives the term 関東 Kantō) referred to the provinces beyond the checkpoints or barrier stations (関 seki) at the eastern fringes of the capital region, more specifically the land east of the checkpoint at Ōsaka/Ausaka Hill (逢坂 'hill of meeting', old orthography: Afusaka; not to be confused with the modern city of Osaka) in modern Ōtsu, Shiga Prefecture. By the Edo period, Kantō was reinterpreted to mean the region east of the checkpoint in Hakone, Kanagawa Prefecture.)
Kashima, Katori, Suwa no Miya, and Hira Myōjin;
also Su in Awa, Otaka Myōjin in Tai no Kuchi,
Yatsurugi in Atsuta, and Tado no Miya in Ise.

— Ryōjin Hishō, song 258 (Note: 「関より東(ひむかし)の軍神(いくさがみ)、鹿島・香取(かんどり)・諏訪の宮、また比良(ひら)の明神、安房の洲(す)滝(たい)の口や小鷹明神、熱田に八剣(やつるぎ)、伊勢には多度(たど)の宮。」)

During the Kamakura period, the Suwa clan's association with the shogunate and the Hōjō clan helped further cement Suwa Myōjin's reputation as a martial deity. The shrines of Suwa and the priestly clans thereof flourished under the patronage of the Hōjō, which promoted devotion to the god as a sign of loyalty to the shogunate. Suwa branch shrines became numerous all across Japan, especially in territories held by clans devoted to the god (for instance, the Kantō region, traditional stronghold of the Minamoto (Seiwa Genji) clan).

The Takeda clan of Kai Province (modern Yamanashi Prefecture) were devotees of Suwa Myōjin, its most famous member, the Sengoku daimyō Takeda Shingen being no exception. His devotion is visibly evident in some of his war banners, which bore the god's name and invocations such as Namu Suwa Nangū Hosshō Kamishimo Daimyōjin (南無諏方南宮法性上下大明神 'Namo Dharma-Nature Daimyōjin of the Suwa Upper and Lower Shrines'). The iconic horned helmet with the flowing white hair commonly associated with Shingen, popularly known as the Suwa-hosshō helmet (諏訪法性兜 Suwa-hosshō-(no)-kabuto), came to be reputed in some popular culture retellings to have been blessed by the god, guaranteeing success in battle to its wearer. Shingen also issued an order for the reinstitution of the religious rites of both the Kamisha and the Shimosha in 1565.

== See also ==
- Moreya
- Mishaguji
- Ōkuninushi
- Onbashira Festival
- Snake worship
- Suwa Daimyōjin Ekotoba
- Suwa taisha
- Takemikazuchi

== Bibliography ==
- Ashkenazi, Michael (2003). Handbook of Japanese Mythology. ABC-CLIO. ISBN 978-1-57607-467-1.
- Aston, George (1896). Nihongi: Chronicles of Japan from the Earliest Times to A.D. 697. London: Kegan Paul, Trench, Trübner & Co.
- A Translation of the "Ko-Ji-Ki," or "Records of Ancient Matters". Translated by Chamberlain, Basil. Yokohama: Lane, Crawford & Co. 1882.
- Fukuda, Akira; Nihonmatsu, Yasuhiro; Tokuda, Kazuo, eds. (2015). 諏訪信仰の中世―神話・伝承・歴史 (Suwa shinkō no chūsei: shinwa, denshō, rekishi). Miyai Shoten. ISBN 978-4838232888. (in Japanese)
- Grumbach, Lisa (2005). Sacrifice and Salvation in Medieval Japan: Hunting and Meat in Religious Practice at Suwa Jinja (PhD). Stanford University.
- J. Hackin (1932). Asiatic Mythology: A Detailed Description and Explanation of the Mythologies of All the Great Nations of Asia. Asian Educational Services. ISBN 978-81-206-0920-4.
- Hara, Naomasa (2012). 龍蛇神: 諏訪大明神の中世的展開 (Ryūjashin: Suwa Daimyōjin no chūseiteki tenkai). Ningensha. ISBN 978-4931388710. (in Japanese)
- Herbert, Jean (2010). Shinto: At the Fountainhead of Japan. Routledge. ISBN 978-1-136-90376-2.
- Ihara, Kesao (March 31, 2008). "鎌倉期の諏訪神社関係史料にみる神道と仏道 : 中世御記文の時代的特質について (Shinto and Buddhism as Depicted in Historical Materials Related to Suwa Shrines of the Kamakura Period : Temporal Characteristics of Medieval Imperial Writings)". Bulletin of the National Museum of Japanese History. 139: 157–185. (in Japanese)
- Imai, Nogiku (1960). 諏訪ものがたり (Suwa monogatari). Kōyō Shobo. (in Japanese)
- Imai, Nogiku (1976). 神々の里 古代諏訪物語 (Kamigami no sato. Kodai Suwa monogatari). Kokusho Kankōkai. (in Japanese)
- Inoue, Takami (2003). "The Interaction between Buddhist and Shinto Traditions at Suwa Shrine." In Rambellli, Fabio; Teuuwen, Mark, eds. (August 29, 2003). Buddhas and Kami in Japan: Honji Suijaku as a Combinatory Paradigm. Routledge. ISBN 978-1134431236.
- Kitazawa, Fusako (January 10, 2020). 諏訪の神さまが気になるの: 古文書でひもとく諏訪信仰のはるかな旅 (Suwa no Kamisama ga ki ni naru no: kobunsho de himotoku Suwa-shinkō no haruka na tabi). Shinano Mainichi Shimbun-sha. ISBN 978-4784073542. (in Japanese)
- Kanai, Tenbi (1982). 諏訪信仰史 (Suwa shinkōshi). Meicho Shuppan. ISBN 978-4626001245. (in Japanese)
- Kodai Buzoku Kenkyūkai, ed. (2017). 古代諏訪とミシャグジ祭政体の研究 (Kodai Suwa to Mishaguji-saiseitai no kenkyū). 日本原初考 (Nihon gensho-kō). Vol. 1. Ningensha. ISBN 978-4908627163. (in Japanese)
- Kodai Buzoku Kenkyūkai, ed. (2017b). 古諏訪の祭祀と氏族 (Ko-Suwa no saishi to shizoku). 日本原初考 (Nihon gensho-kō). Vol. 2. Ningensha. ISBN 978-4908627163. (in Japanese)
- Kodai Buzoku Kenkyūkai, ed. (2018). 諏訪信仰の発生と展開 (Suwa shinkō no hassei to tenkai). 日本原初考 (Nihon gensho-kō). Vol. 3. Ningensha. ISBN 978-4908627170. (in Japanese)
- Maeda, Ryōtarō (August 8, 2019). "『諏方大明神画詞』諏方社祭絵第四、六月晦日条考 : 「藤嶋ノ明神」をめぐるテクストの諸相 ("Suwa Daimyōjin Ekotoba" Suwa-sha-sai-e daiyon, rokugatsu misoka-jō-kō: 'Fujishima no Myōjin' o meguru tekusuto no shosō)". 国語国文研究 (Kokugo Kokubun Kenkyū) (in Japanese). 153. Hokkaido University: 33–45.
- Maeda, Ryōtarō (October 2020). "The Reception of the Sendaikujihongi and the Transformation of Myth: Regarding the Use of Descriptions of Shinto Shrines (『先代旧事本紀』の受容と神話の変奏 : 神社関連記事の利用をめぐって)" (PDF). Kokugakuin Zasshi (The Journal of Kokugakuin University) (in Japanese). 121 (10): 43–57.
- Maeda, Ryōtarō (May 2021). "The Reception and Development of the Biography of Prince Shotoku in the Legend of Suwa Myojin: With a Focus on the "Suwa Daimyojin Koshiki" (諏訪明神縁起における聖徳太子伝の受容と展開)". Kokugakuin Zasshi (The Journal of Kokugakuin University) (in Japanese). 122 (5): 59–75.
- Maeda, Ryōtarō (March 20, 2023). "『諏方大明神画詞』の受容史：国譲り神話の扱いを中心に ("Suwa Daimyojin Ekotoba" no juyōshi: kuni-yuzuri shinwa no atsukai o chūshin ni)". 国語国文研究 (Kokugo Kokubun Kenkyū) (in Japanese). 160. Hokkaido University: 16–30. hdl:2115/91668.
- Miyasaka, Mitsuaki (1992). 諏訪大社の御柱と年中行事 (Suwa taisha no onbashira to nenchu-gyōji). Kyōdo shuppansha. ISBN 978-4-87663-178-0. (in Japanese)
- Miyaji, Naoichi (1931). 諏訪史 第二卷 前編 (Suwa-shi, vol. 2, part 1). Shinano kyōikukai Suwa-bukai. (in Japanese)
- Miyaji, Naoichi (1931b). 諏訪史 第二卷 後編 (Suwa-shi, vol. 2, part 2). Shinano kyōikukai Suwa-bukai. (in Japanese)
- Muraoka, Geppo (1969). 諏訪の祭神 (Suwa no saijin). Tokyo: Yūzankaku-shuppan. (in Japanese)
- Nihonmatsu, Yasuhiro, ed. (January 17, 2019). 諏訪信仰の歴史と伝承 (Suwa shinkō no rekishi to denshō). Miyai Shoten. ISBN 978-4-8382-3344-1. (in Japanese)
- Oh, Amana ChungHae (2011). Cosmogonical Worldview of Jomon Pottery. Sankeisha. ISBN 978-4-88361-924-5.
- Ōta, Akira (1926). 諏訪神社誌 第1巻 (Suwa jinja-shi: Volume 01). Nagano: Kanpei-taisha Suwa-jinja fuzoku Suwa-myōjin-kōsha. (in Japanese)
- Ōwa, Iwao (1990). 信濃古代史考 (Shinano kodaishi-kō). Tokyo: Meicho Shuppan. ISBN 978-4626013637. (in Japanese)
- Suwa, Enchū. Suwa Daimyōjin Ekotoba, in Hanawa, Hokiichi, ed. (1925). 続群書類従 第3輯ノ下 神祇部 (Zoku Gunsho Ruijū, vol. 03, part 02). Tokyo: Zoku Gunsho Ruijū Kanseikai. pp. 494–539. (in Japanese)
- Suwa Kyōikukai, ed. (1938). 諏訪史年表 (Suwa shinenpyō). Nagano: Suwa Kyōikukai.
- Suwa Shishi Hensan Iinkai, ed. (1995). 諏訪市史 上巻 原始・古代・中世 (Suwa Shishi, vol. 1: Genshi, Kodai, Chūsei). Suwa. (in Japanese)
- Tanigawa, Kenichi, ed. (1987). 日本の神々―神社と聖地〈9〉美濃・飛騨・信濃 (Nihon no kamigami: Jinja to seichi, vol. 9: Mino, Hida, Shinano). Hakusuisha. ISBN 978-4-560-02509-3. (in Japanese)
- Terada, Shizuko; Washio, Tetsuta (2010). 諏訪明神―カミ信仰の原像 (Suwa Myōjin: Kami shinkō no genzō). Iwata Shoin. ISBN 978-4-8729-4608-6. (in Japanese)
- Ueda, Masaaki; Gorai, Shigeru; Miyasaka, Yūshō; Ōbayashi, Taryō; Miyasaka, Mitsuaki (1987). 御柱祭と諏訪大社 (Onbashira-sai to Suwa Taisha). Nagano: Chikuma Shobō. ISBN 978-4-480-84181-0. (in Japanese)
- Yazaki, Takenori, ed. (1986). 諏訪大社 (Suwa Taisha). Ginga gurafikku sensho. Vol. 4. Ginga shobō. (in Japanese)
