= Shake (social class) =

Japanese social class that dominates Shinto shrines

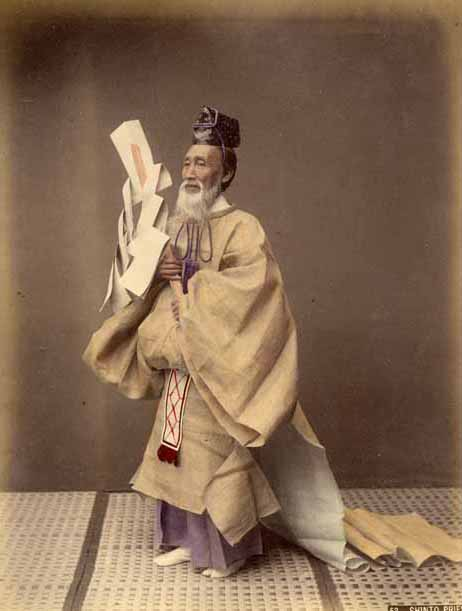
A high priest in 1902, photographed by Kusakabe Kimbei

The Shake (社家) was a Japanese social class and the name for families that dominated Shinto shrines through hereditary government offices and priestly positions. Officially abolished in 1871, with 14 shake families granted hereditary nobility (Kazoku), most shrines were deprived of their power and influence over adepts however a few and prestigious ancient families remained unaffected in terms of succession, as attested by hereditary succession of former shake families continuing to this day. Prominent shake families include the Nakatomi family and the Suwa family.

== History ==
In ancient times, shrine rituals were performed by political leaders and clan heads, whereas in some rural areas villagers took turns serving the village shrine. Eventually, when it became necessary for a priest to work full-time, professional priests were born, and the positions became hereditary.

Since ancient times, the shake families worshipped their ancestral god of the clan. For this reason, most shake families serving ancient shrines were originally Kuni-no-miyatsuko clans.

The shake as an official social class was abolished from the political ideology that a shrine should not belong to one family as part of the Daijō-kan decree in 1871. However, in reality this only applied to Kokuhei-sha-ranked shrines and the hereditary succession of former shake families at rural shrines continued. In addition, 14 shake families were appointed Kazoku hereditary peerage.

== Shake families ==
Some of the most well-known shake families include:

- Nakatomi family of Kasuga Grand Shrine, Katori Shrine, and Kashima Shrine
- Suwa family of Suwa Grand Shrine
- Arakida and Watarai families of Ise Grand Shrine
- Senge and Kitajima families of Izumo Taisha
- Urabe family of Yoshida Shrine
- Aso clan of Aso Shrine
- the Owari clan of Atsuta Shrine
- Munakata clan of Munakata Taisha,
- Amabe clan of Kono Shrine
- Yamato clan of Ōyamato Shrine.
- Tsumori family of Sumiyoshi-taisha

== See also ==
- Shinkan (official)
- Shinto shrine
