= Suwa clan =

Japanese social class and samurai clan

Suwa clan 諏訪氏
- The emblem (mon) of the Suwa clan
- Home province: Shinano Province
- Parent house: Kanasashi clan? Ōmiwa clan?
- Titles: High priest (Ōhōri) of the Upper Suwa Shrine; Daimyō of Takashima Domain
- Founder: Takeminakata (legendary); Historically unknown
- Founding year: Unknown
- Ruled until: 1871 (han system and hereditary priesthood abolished)
- Cadet branches: Suwa clan (諏方氏) (defunct); Takatoo clan (高遠氏); Hoshina clan (保科氏); Chino clan (千野氏)

The Suwa clan (諏訪氏, Suwa-shi), also known as the Jin or Miwa clan (神氏, Miwa uji / Miwa-shi or Jinshi) was a Japanese shake and samurai family. Originating from the area encompassing Lake Suwa in Shinano Province (modern-day Nagano Prefecture), it was originally a family of priests who served at the Upper Shrine of Suwa located on the southwestern side of the lake. By the Kamakura period, it thrived as a prominent samurai clan with close ties to the shogunate.

Surviving the fall of both the Kamakura shogunate and the Southern Imperial Court which it supported, its feud with local rival clans, and frequent clashes with its neighbor in Kai, the Takeda clan, during the Sengoku period (which ended in the extinction of the main family), by the Edo period the clan had split into two branches: one ruling the Suwa Domain of Shinano as daimyō, with the other continuing to serve as priests of Suwa Shrine until the Meiji era.

== Ancestry ==
=== In legend ===
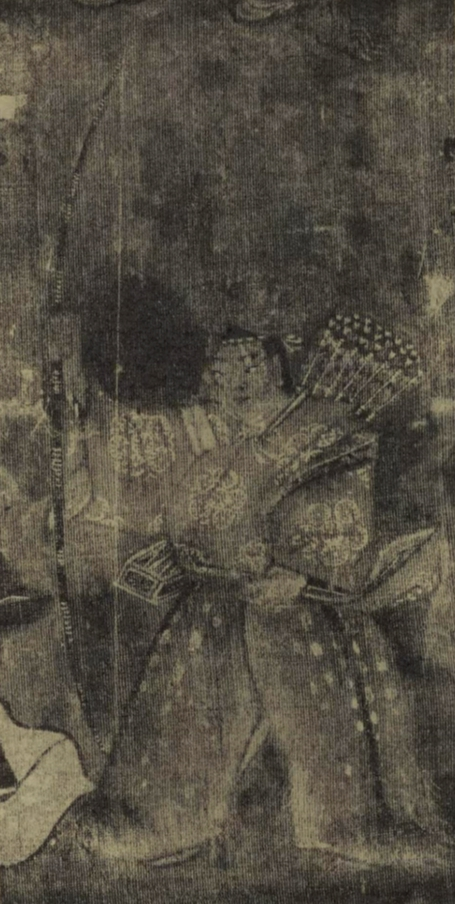
Suwa Daimyōjin (Takeminakata) wearing hunting gear. Religious rites centered around hunting and agriculture were an integral part of Suwa Shrine's ritual calendar in the medieval period.

Although the Suwa, which was the high priestly lineage of the Upper Shrine (上社 Kamisha) of Suwa, one of the component shrines of Suwa Grand Shrine, traditionally regarded themselves to be the descendants of the shrine's deity, Takeminakata (also known as Suwa Daimyōjin), the clan's actual historical origins are shrouded in mystery.

In the Kojiki and the Sendai Kuji Hongi, Takeminakata is portrayed as a son of the god Ōkuninushi who fled to Suwa after his defeat at the hands of the god Takemikazuchi, who was sent by the gods of heaven to claim the land held by his father in the name of the goddess Amaterasu. Other myths (mostly of medieval provenance), however, portray the Suwa deity in a different light. In one story, Suwa Daimyōjin is an interloper who wrested control of Suwa from the indigenous god Moriya, the mythical ancestor of the Moriya (守矢氏) clan, one of the priestly families of the Upper Shrine. In another myth, the god is said to have chosen an eight-year-old boy to become his priest (祝, hōri; historical orthography: hafuri) and living incarnation by clothing the latter with his own garments. This boy is eventually said to have become the founding ancestor of the Suwa clan.

Medieval tradition usually identified a semi-legendary individual named Arikazu (有員), who is said to have lived in the early Heian period during the reigns of the emperors Kanmu (reigned 781-806), Heizei (806-809), and Saga (809-823), to be this child. The Suwa Daimyōjin Ekotoba (1356) for example relates:

At the beginning of the god's manifestation, he took off his robe, put them on an eight-year-old boy, and dubbed him 'great priest' (Ōhōri). The god declared, "I do not have a body and so make this priest (hōri) my body." This [boy] is Arikazu (有員), the priest of the sacred robe (御衣祝 Misogihōri), the founding ancestor of the Miwa (Jin) clan.

However, a brief text attached to a genealogical record of the Suwa clan discovered in the Ōhōri's residence in 1884 instead portrays Arikazu as a descendant of Kumako (神子 or 熊子), a son of a kuni no miyatsuko (provincial governor) of Shinano Province, who is claimed to have founded the Upper Shrine during the reign of Emperor Yōmei (585-587).

When Kumako was eight years old, the revered deity appeared, took off his robe and put them on Kumako. After declaring, "I do not have a body and so make you my body," he disappeared. This [Kumako] is the ancestor of Arikazu of the Miwa (Jin) clan, the Misogihōri. In the second year of Emperor Yōmei, Kumako built a sanctuary at the foot of the mountain at the southern side of the lake.

Another genealogical record, that of the Aso clan (阿蘇氏) of Aso Shrine in Kyushu (discovered in 1956), similarly identifies Otoei (乙頴) - there given the alias 'Kumako' - as the "Ōhōri of the great deity of Suwa" (諏訪大神大祝) and narrates the same legend as those found above. Recent reappraisals of these two genealogies, however, have cast doubt on their authenticity and reliability as historical sources.

Apart from these candidates, the clan has also been claimed to descend from the Seiwa Genji via Minamoto no Mitsuyasu (one of the sons of Minamoto no Tsunemoto).

== The Suwa Ōhōri ==
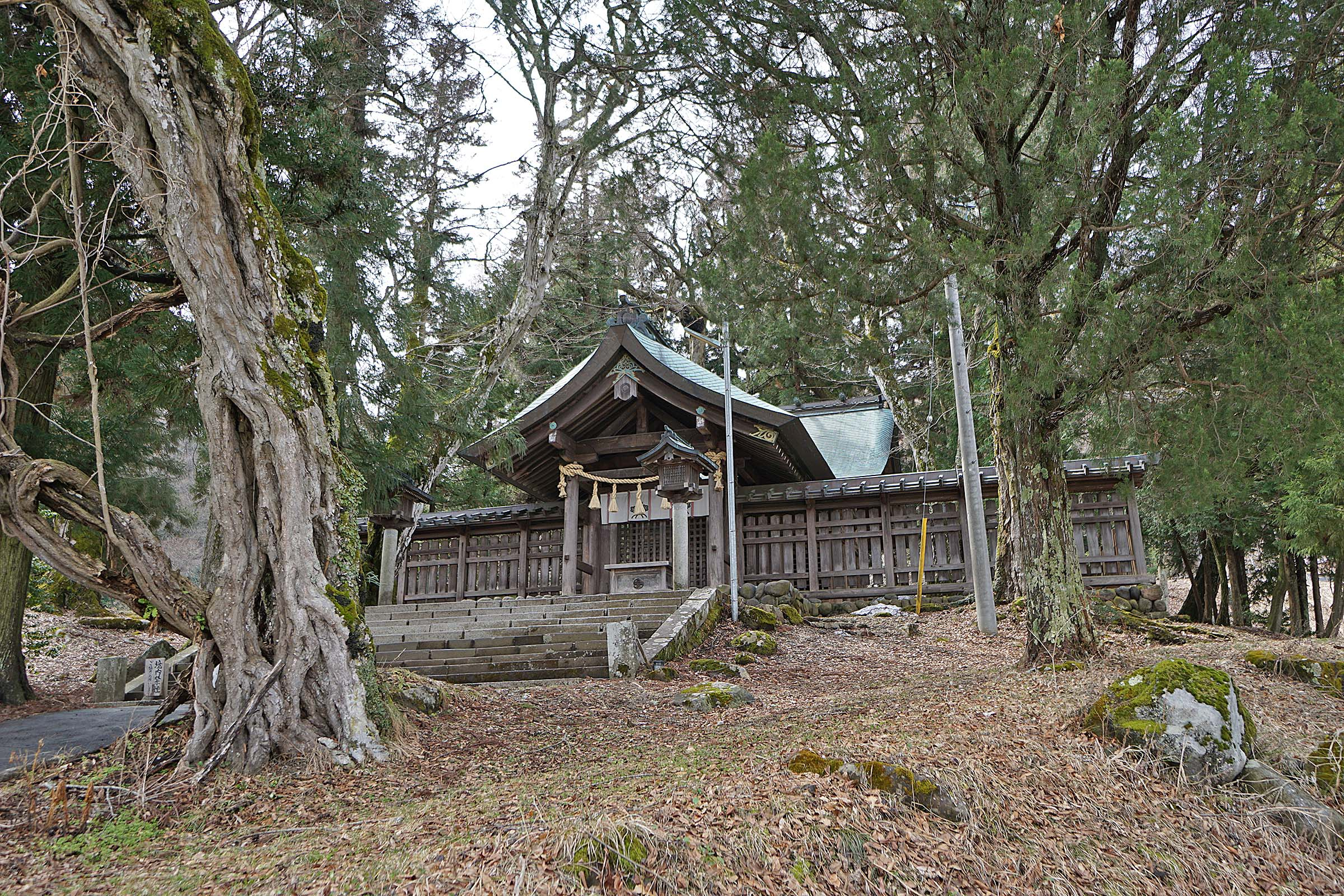
Kamisha Maemiya, one of the two main shrines that comprise the Upper Shrine of Suwa. The Upper Shrine's high priest or Ōhōri resided in this area during the medieval period.

In antiquity, the Suwa clan produced the Upper Shrine (上社 Kamisha) of Suwa's high priest known as the Ōhōri (大祝 'great priest', old orthography: おほはふり Ohohafuri; also rendered as Ōhafuri), who was worshiped as the living avatar of the shrine's deity during his period in office.

The Ōhōri, who traditionally assumed the position at a young age (ideally between the ages of eight and fifteen), was assisted by five priests headed by the Jinchōkan (神長官) of the Moriya clan, who oversaw the Upper Shrine's religious rituals, many of which are centered around the worship of agricultural and fertility god(s) called Mishaguji. The Jinchōkan was believed to have the prerogative to summon the Mishaguji onto individuals and objects whenever its presence was called for.

Though officially the Upper Shrine's chief priest and as incarnate deity, an object of worship, the Suwa Ōhōri had little, if any, actual power over the shrine's affairs, which rested in the hands of the Moriya Jinchōkan, with his unique relationship to the Mishaguji and his knowledge of closely guarded secret traditions passed down via word of mouth only to the heir to the office. In fact, it was due to the Jinchōkan summoning the Mishaguji onto the Ōhōri during the investiture ceremony that the latter became a living deity.

=== Investiture ceremony ===
The full rite of investiture into the office of Ōhōri as practiced in the late medieval period involved the candidate first undergoing a twenty-two day period of strict ritual purification in the Maemiya (前宮 'old shrine'), one of the Upper Shrine's two component shrines. During the day of the ceremony itself, the Jinchōkan led the candidate by the hand before a sacred tree west of the Gōdono (神殿), the Ōhōri's residence during his term located west of the Maemiya, under which was a flat rock known as the kanameishi (要石 'keystone'). During the ceremony, this rock is surrounded a makeshift enclosure or hut and a mat of reeds was placed over it for the boy to sit on.

Inside this enclosure, the Jinchōkan dressed the boy in full ritual attire: traditional makeup (oshiroi, ohaguro, beni and mayuzumi), a dull yellow-green sokutai, a hakama, and a crown (kanmuri). The Jinchōkan then summoned the Mishaguji (who as a nature spirit was believed to manifest on rocks and trees) to the kanameishi via secret incantations. Via the rock, the Mishaguji was then believed to enter the child's body, thereby turning him into a living god.

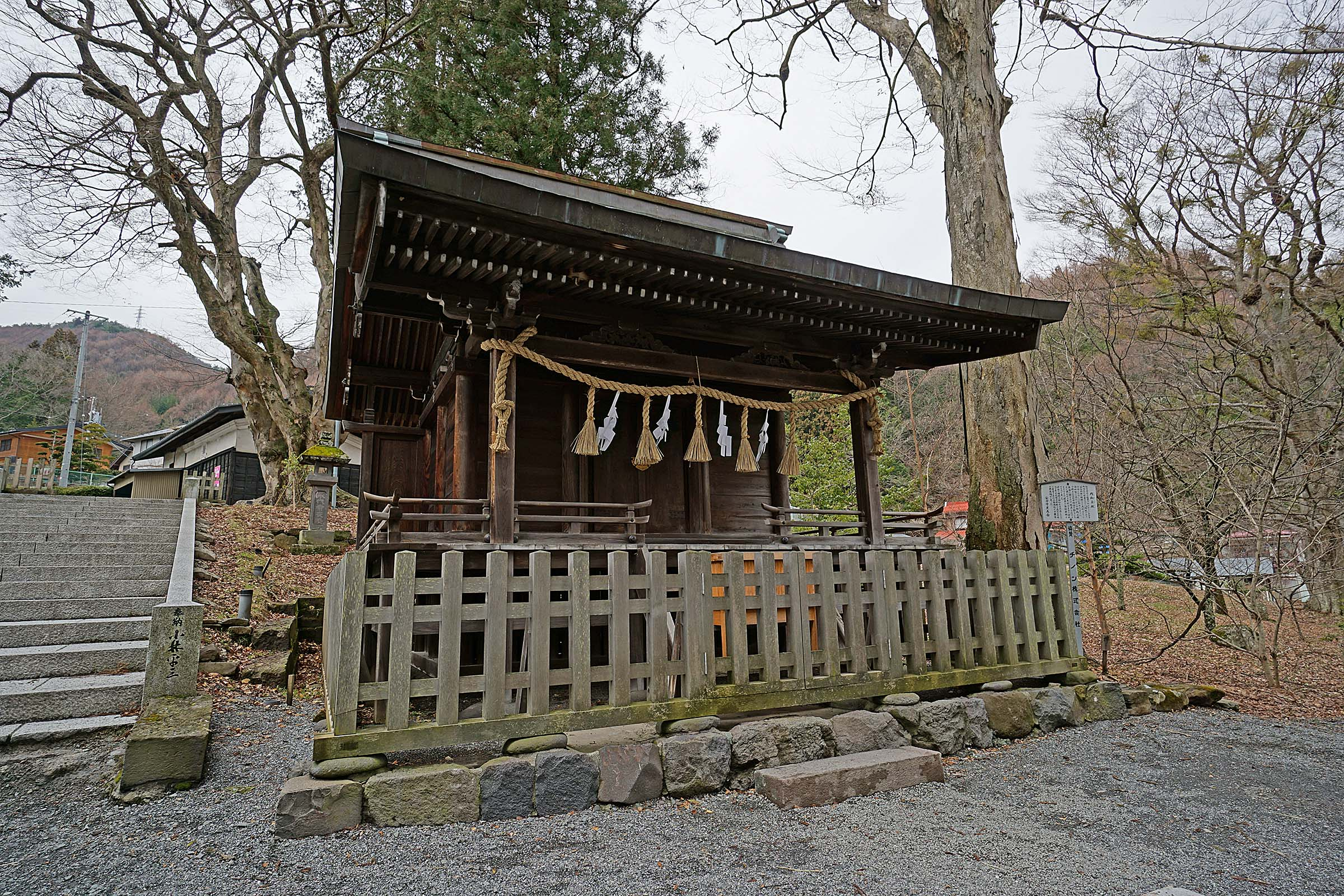
The Uchi-no-mitama-den (内御玉殿)

After being consecrated, the Ōhōri visited the various shrines of the Upper Shrine complex. In another shrine in the Maemiya area, the Uchi-no-mitama-den (内御霊殿), wherein was kept the sacred treasures of the Upper Shrine (a bell, a mirror, a bit and a saddle) that were supposedly brought to the region by Suwa Daimyōjin himself, the Ōhōri made a ritual declaration (申立 mōshitate) that he has become the god's new 'body' and will henceforth avoid impurity.

As time went on the ritual became increasingly simplified and later, was supposedly even omitted altogether, with the ōhōri simply assuming the position without any ceremony.

=== Role ===
During his term, the incumbent Ōhōri was treated as the physical manifestation of Suwa Daimyōjin. In 1186, Minamoto no Yoritomo officially recognized the Ōhōri as the god's incarnation in a letter to his subordinates, declaring that the Ōhōri's orders are those of the god himself.

The Ōhōri was expected to live a life of ritual purity and was also forbidden to step outside the boundaries of Suwa region under pain of divine punishment.

During his term of office, the Ōhōri originally resided in a building near the Suwa Maemiya known as the Gōdono (神殿). Reflecting its being the residence of an incarnate deity, the Maemiya area and its vicinity was known during the Middle Ages as the Gōbara (神原), the 'god's field'.

Should an incumbent Ōhōri die while in office, his corpse was immediately brought before the Uchi-no-mitama-den where he was ceremonially retired - the idea being that the Ōhōri's spirit was temporarily deposited in the shrine until a new candidate was chosen. Originally, the deceased priest was buried wearing hunting attire (such as that supposedly worn by Suwa Daimyōjin) and with hair and beard kept unshaven. However, in 1465, with the death of then Ōhōri Yorinaga (頼長), the local priesthood began to adopt the Buddhist custom of cremation.

By the early 17th century, the Ōhōri's residence was moved from the Maemiya to a place in what is now Nakasu, Suwa City.

== History ==
=== From the Heian period to the Sengoku period ===
In the meantime, other male members of the clan aside from the ōhōri - who cannot step outside the boundaries of the region, as well as come into contact with sources of impurity such as the flesh and blood of men or horses - began to pursue military careers.

One of the first recorded warriors from the clan was Tamenaka (為仲), a son of then ōhōri Tamenobu (為信). Tamenaka served under Minamoto no Yoshiie during the Zenkunen War (1051-1063) under the orders of his father, who could not participate himself due to his priestly status. He then also served again under Yoshiie in the later Gosannen War of the 1080s, this time despite opposition from his family due to him already inheriting the position of ōhōri from Tamenobu in the interim between the two wars. Tamenaka's eventual suicide out of shame after his subordinates had a violent quarrel with Minamoto no Yoshimitsu's men during a feast held by the latter was considered to be divine punishment for his violation of the ban.

Due to the circumstances of his father's death, Tamenaka's son, Tamemori (為盛) did not inherit the office of ōhōri, it instead passing in succession to Tamenaka's three younger brothers, two of whom died within mere days of their investiture. It would be the youngest brother, Tamesada (為貞), who would turn out to successfully pass down the priesthood to his progeny.

By the Kamakura period, the clan - now renowned as being both a priestly and a warrior clan - rose to national prominence as vassals (gokenin) of the shogunate and later, flourished greatly under the patronage of the Hōjō clan. The clan's fortunes waned with the fall of the Kamakura shogunate and the defeat of the Southern Imperial Court (which the clan supported) during the Nanboku-chō period.

During the Muromachi period, the Suwa were involved both in a feud with the Kanasashi clan of the Shimosha which supported the Northern Court, and interclan strife between the head family (惣領家 sōryō-ke) and the ōhōri-ke (大祝家), a branch of the clan that had come to assume the priestly duties. With the defeat of the Kanasashi and the head family's reattainment of the position of ōhori, the clan became a regional power, clashing with the Takeda clan - originally their allies - during the Sengoku period. The clan again suffered a setback with Suwa Yorishige's defeat in the hands of Takeda Shingen (who was, ironically, a staunch devotee of Suwa-myōjin) in 1542 and with his suicide in 1544, the extinction of the main family; his cousin Yoritada (諏訪頼忠, 1536-1606), who succeeded Yorishige's younger brother Yoritaka (諏訪頼高, 1528-1542) as ōhōri, was spared. After the Takeda was destroyed by an alliance of Oda Nobunaga and Tokugawa Ieyasu, Yoritada allied himself with the latter, who eventually reinstated Yoritada in his family domain in 1601.

=== Edo period onwards ===
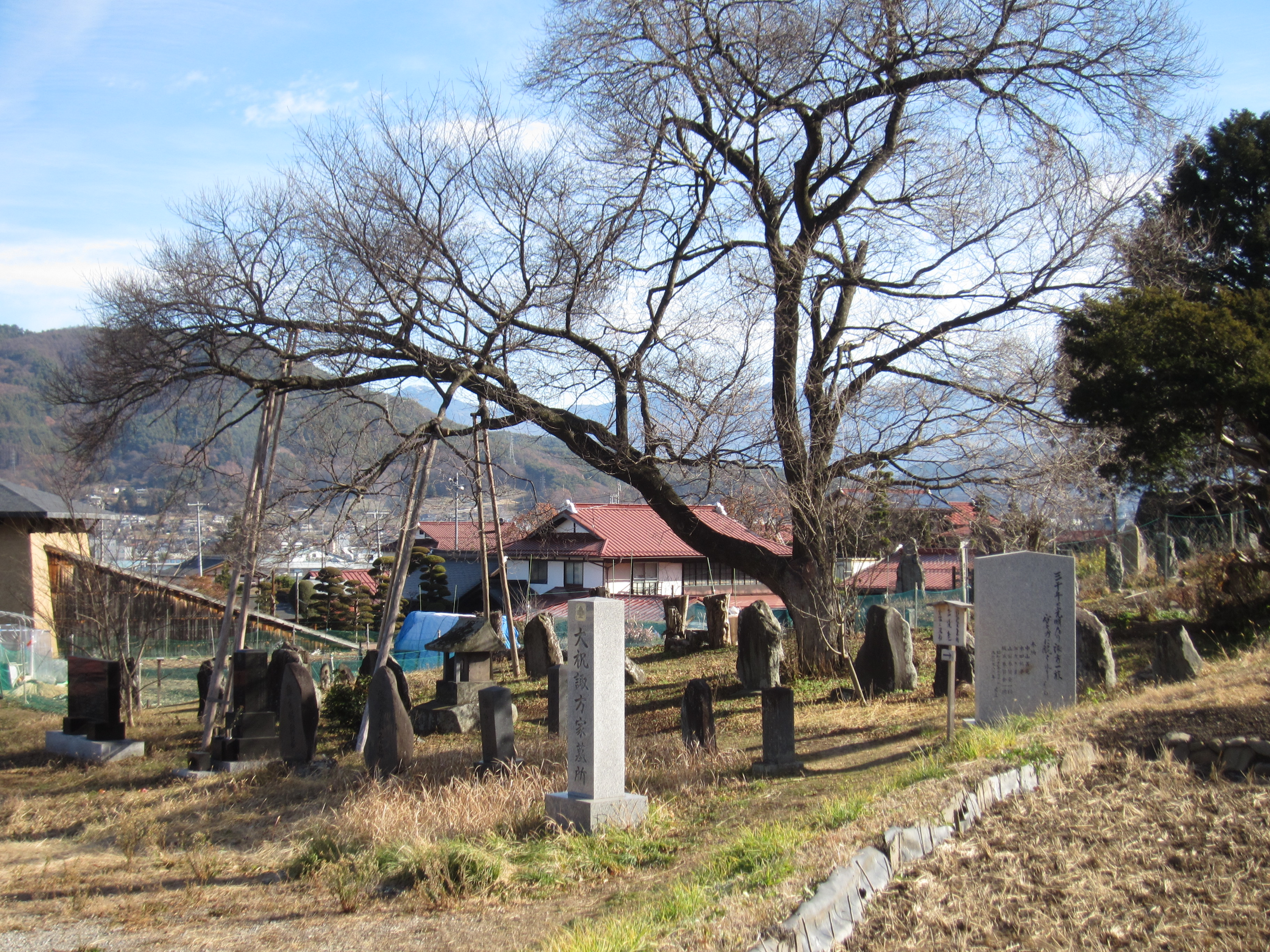
The graves of various Suwa ōhōri within the Moriya clan's estate grounds in Chino City, Nagano.

Yoritada's eldest son, Yorimizu (頼水, 1571-1641) became the first daimyō to rule Suwa Domain, with the office of ōhōri passing down to his fourth son, Yorihiro (頼広). With this, the clan effectively split into two branches: the daimyō line and the ōhōri line. To distinguish themselves from the daimyō line, the priestly line altered one of the Chinese characters of their surname (from 諏訪 to 諏方).

All in all, ten generations served as daimyō of Suwa Domain until the abolition of the han system during the Meiji era.

Meanwhile, the establishment of State Shinto abolished the tradition of hereditary succession among Shinto priesthood, including that of Suwa Grand Shrine. Local clans such as the Suwa lost control of the shrine's traditional priestly offices (which in turn became defunct) as government appointees began to manage the shrine, which passed under state control.

The last Suwa ōhōri, the fifteenth since Yorihiro, died in 2002 with no heirs.

== See also ==
- Mishaguji
- Moreya
- Suwa Domain
- Suwa Taisha
- Suwa Province
- Takeda Shingen
- Takeminakata
