= Suwa Daimyōjin Ekotoba =

Best

The Suwa Daimyōjin Ekotoba (諏方大明神画詞 or 諏訪大明神絵詞 "Illustrated Record of Suwa Daimyōjin (Shrine)"), also known as Suwa Daimyōjin Go-engi Shidai (諏訪大明神御縁起次第 "Order of Legends (Engi) of Suwa Daimyōjin (Shrine)") or Suwa(-sha) Engi Emaki (諏方（社）縁起絵巻 "Illustrated Legends of Suwa (Shrine)"), was a twelve (originally ten) volume set of emakimono or painted handscrolls completed in 1356 (Enbun 1), during the Nanboku-chō period. Originally describing and depicting legends concerning the Suwa Grand Shrine in Shinano Province (modern-day Nagano Prefecture) and its deity as well as its various religious festivals as performed during the Middle Ages, the original scrolls containing the illustrations were eventually lost, with only the text being preserved in various manuscripts.

== Historical overview ==
The Ekotoba was created under the supervision of Suwa (or Kosaka) Enchū (諏訪（小坂）円忠, 1295–1364), a member of a cadet branch of the Suwa clan, originally a priestly lineage of one of the component shrines of the Grand Shrine of Suwa, the Upper Shrine or Kamisha that had, by the Kamakura period, took up arms and became a clan of warriors.

Enchū was originally an officer or bugyō under the Hōjō clan, which the Suwa served as vassals or miuchibito at the time. After the fall of the Hōjō, Enchū moved from Kamakura to Kyoto, where he served under Emperor Go-Daigo's court as a yoriudo (寄人) or clerk in the Court of Pleas (雑訴決断所 Zasso Ketsudansho, also 'Court of Miscellaneous Claims'), which handled minor lawsuits.

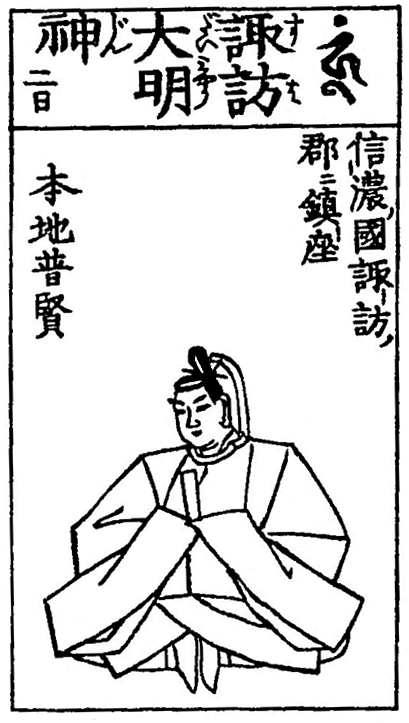
Suwa Daimyōjin as depicted in the Butsuzōzui (originally published 1690).

=== Suwa Shrine in the Kamakura period ===
The deity of the Suwa Kamisha, Suwa (Dai)myōjin (諏訪（大）明神), commonly identified with the god Takeminakata recorded in both the Kojiki (720 CE) and the later Sendai Kuji Hongi (807-936 CE, aka Kujiki), was worshipped as a god of warfare since the Heian period, as attested to by a 12th-century song anthology, the Ryōjin Hishō. A popular legend claimed that the god appeared to the 8th-century general Sakanoue no Tamuramaro and assisted him in his subjugation of the Emishi peoples who lived in what is now the Tōhoku region; in thanksgiving, Tamuramaro was said to have instituted the religious festivities of the shrines of Suwa. Some medieval sources, including the Ekotoba itself, also credit Suwa Myōjin with having assisted Empress Jingū during her legendary military campaign on the Korean peninsula, alongside similar claims made of Hachiman and Sumiyoshi Myōjin in works such as the Heike Monogatari and the Hachiman Gudōkun, further reinforcing the god's character as a deity of war.

During the Kamakura period, the Suwa clan's association with the shogunate and the Hōjō clan helped further cement Suwa Myōjin's reputation as a war god. The shrines of Suwa and the priestly clans thereof flourished under the patronage of the Hōjō, which promoted devotion to the god as a sign of loyalty to the shogunate. For their part, the Hōjō, a clan of obscure origins who lacked an ancestral kami (ujigami) of their own, looked upon Suwa Myōjin as the closest thing they had to a guardian deity. Suwa branch shrines became numerous all across Japan, especially in territories held by clans devoted to the god (for instance, the Kantō region, traditional stronghold of the Minamoto (Seiwa Genji) clan). The Suwa were themselves regarded as the most influential among the shogunate's vassals.

=== The Suwa clan and the fall of the Kamakura shogunate ===
The Suwa clan suffered a heavy setback at the downfall of the Hōjō and the shogunate itself in 1333, when Ashikaga Takauji, a chief general of the Hōjō, switched sides and began to support Emperor Go-Daigo against the shogunate.

Testifying to the close connections between the warrior families of the Suwa region and the Hōjō is the fact that many members of the Suwa clan present in Kamakura during the siege of the city in 1333 committed suicide alongside Hōjō Takatoki. Takatoki's son, the young Tokiyuki, sought refuge in Shinano with Suwa Yorishige (諏訪頼重, not to be confused with the Sengoku period daimyō of the same name) and his son, Tokitsugu (時継), the Suwa Kamisha's ōhōri or high priest believed to be the physical manifestation of Suwa Myōjin during his term of office.

In July–August 1335, the Suwa and other clans who remained loyal to the Hōjō, led by Tokiyuki, instigated an armed rebellion with the intention of reestablishing the Kamakura shogunate, which was quashed by Takauji; Yorishige, Tokitsugu, and some others who participated in this uprising – later known as the Nakasendai Rebellion (中千代の乱) - all committed suicide in Kamakura. Tokitsugu's son who inherited the office of ōhōri, Yoritsugu (頼継), was stripped from his position and replaced by Fujisawa Masayori (藤沢政頼), who hailed from a cadet branch of the clan. Now declared an enemy of the imperial throne, Yoritsugu went into hiding.

Upon his successful retaking of Kamakura, Takauji began to turn against Go-Daigo, granting land to his retainers without the approval of the emperor. In 1336, Takauji defeated pro-imperialists Nitta Yoshisada and Kusunoki Masashige in the Battle of Minatogawa and drove Go-Daigo out of Kyoto. Setting up his own military government in the capital, Takauji then installed a new emperor in opposition to Go-Daigo's court. Thus began a conflict that would lead to the rise of two rival imperial courts.

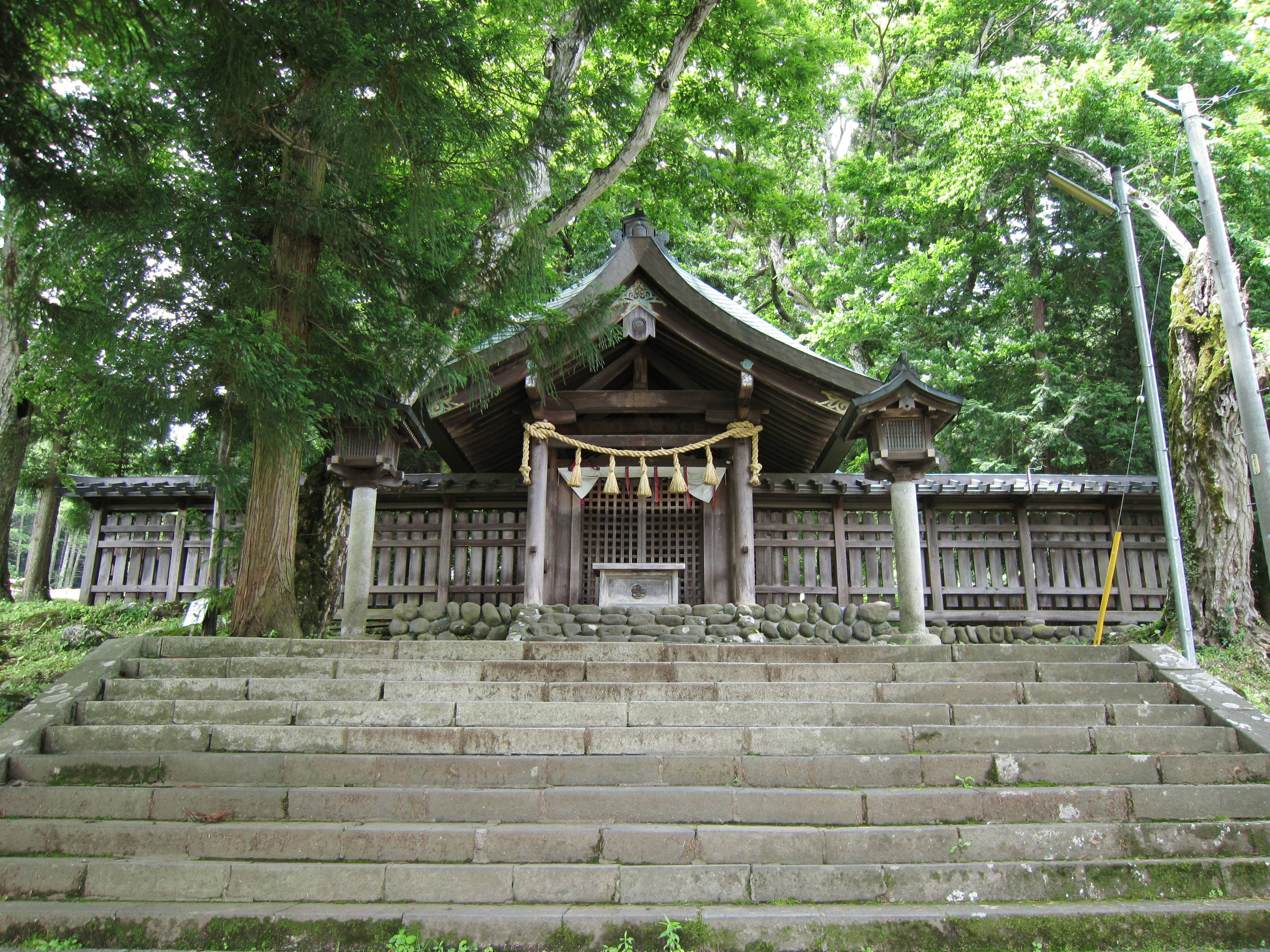
The Maemiya (前宮), one of the two sub-shrines of the Upper Shrine (Kamisha) of Suwa.

=== Enchū's promotion of the Suwa cult ===
Enchū, naturally, apparently found himself in a difficult position during this turbulent period due to a conflict of interest, his position at the court clashing with his familial ties as a member of the Suwa clan. Leaving Kyoto to go to his ancestral land, he set about redeeming the good name of the Upper Shrine's ōhōri and ensuring that the prestige the shrines of Suwa enjoyed in the past be revived and continue under the new state of affairs. Enlisting the help of both the Ogasawara clan of Shinano and the Takeda clan of Kai, he deposed Masayori from the high priesthood and put Yoritsugu's younger brother, Nobutsugu (信嗣), in his place. Enchū strove to secure the Ashikaga shogunate's support of the shrines of Suwa and to get back shrine landholdings that had been appropriated by disaffected samurai.

By 1338 (Ryakuō 1), Enchū was back in Kyoto, Zen master Musō Soseki (adviser and close confidant to the two Ashikaga brothers, Takauji and Tadayoshi) securing him a position within the Ashikaga shogunate. While in the capital, Enchū continued to promote devotion to Suwa Myōjin. In 1339, he was appointed overseer of the construction of Tenryū-ji, which was meant to function as a mortuary temple (bodaiji) for Go-Daigo, who died that year.

At Soseki's persuasion, Takauji had a temple (Ankoku-ji, "Temple for National Pacification") and a pagoda built in every province in Japan. It is thought that Enchū exerted an influence over the location of Shinano Province's Ankoku-ji: rather than being situated in the provincial capital (the modern city of Matsumoto), the temple was instead built near one of the two sub-shrines of the Kamisha, the Maemiya (modern Chino City), where the Suwa ōhōri then resided.

=== Compiling the Suwa Engi ===
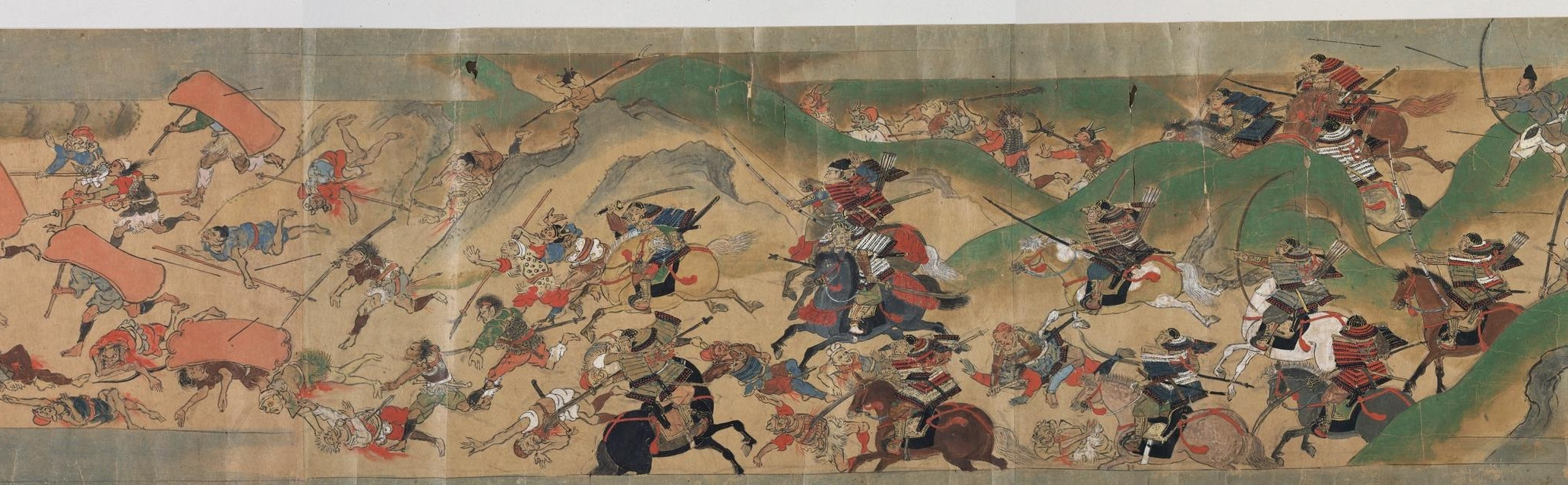
Detail from a scene in the Kiyomizu-dera Engi Emaki (清水寺縁起絵巻) showing Sakanoue no Tamuramaro's forces fighting against Ezo troops. Illustrated scrolls (emaki) that narrate and portray the origins (engi) of prominent shrines and temples such as this one were popular during the medieval period.

Illustrated scrolls (emakimono) depicting the respective foundation legends (engi) of various important shrines and temples and related anecdotes (setsuwa) were popular in medieval Japan. Intended to showcase the history and/or the religious rites of the shrine or temple in question as well as to advertise the powers and benefits of the god or buddha enshrined there, such picture scrolls were produced either by patrons or worshipers or the religious institutions themselves and were at times even considered to be sacred.

Suwa Shrine originally also had an emaki of its own that apparently depicted the shrine's religious ceremonies; this scroll (or scrolls), however, have already disappeared during the 14th century. Enchū, who have been thinking of another means to promote devotion to the god of Suwa and his shrine, thus decided to commission a new set of engi emaki as a replacement for these lost scrolls.

In composing the main text, Enchū researched both the official chronicles, namely the Nihon Shoki and the Sendai Kuji Hongi (at the time still considered to be of venerable antiquity on par with the Nihon Shoki and the Kojiki), as well as local sources. He also made use of various tales and legends concerning Suwa Shrine. He was assisted in this task by Yoshida Kanetoyo (吉田兼豊), then senior assistant director (神祇大輔 jingi taifu) of the Department of Divinities, via a friend in the court, aristocrat and statesman Tōin Kinkata (洞院公賢, 1291–1360).

The actual scrolls themselves were written and illustrated by some of the best high-ranking calligraphers and artists of the age such as Prince Son'en (尊円親王, 1298–1356), son of Emperor Fushimi and abbot of Shōren-in in Kyoto. Emperor Go-Kōgon of the Northern Court inscribed the title on the labels (外題 gedai) of each scroll, while Ashikaga Takauji wrote afterwords at the end of each volume.

The ten-volume work was finally completed in 1356 (Enbun 1) after ten years of production.

=== Later history and disappearance ===
The scrolls were kept in Kyoto under the possession of Enchū's descendants. In mid-1442 (Kakitsu 2), Enchū's fourth-generation descendant, Suwa Shōgen Chūsei (諏訪将監忠政), exhibited these to courtier Nakahara Yasutomi (中原康富) and certain others. Later the same year, the scrolls were temporarily loaned to be shown to the then Fushimi-no-miya and his son, Emperor Go-Hanazono. Records from this time such as Nakahara's diary consistently refer to the Suwa Engi as comprising twelve volumes, suggesting that two more scrolls were added to the work in the interim.

A possible passing reference to the Suwa Engi still being in Kyoto occurs in 1585 (Tenshō 14), after which they completely vanish from the historical record. However, one copy of the text made in 1601 may suggest that the work was still extant as late as the beginning of the 17th century.

== Contents ==
The work originally spanned ten scrolls: the first three were devoted to the engi of Suwa Shrine, while the other seven described the yearly religious festivals of the shrine (mostly that of the Kamisha) by season. Some time afterwards, a further two scrolls of engi – the fourth and fifth volumes – were added to the collection, for a total of twelve.

1. Legends (Engi), First Volume (縁起 上巻)
2. Legends, Second Volume (縁起 中巻)
3. Legends, Third Volume (縁起 下巻)
4. Legends, Volume 04 (縁起 第四)
5. Legends, Volume 05 (縁起 第五)
6. Festivals (Matsuri), Volume 01: Spring, part 01 (祭一 春上)
7. Festivals, Volume 02: Spring, part 02 (祭二 春下)
8. Festivals, Volume 03: Summer, part 01 (祭三 夏上)
9. Festivals, Volume 04: Summer, part 02 (祭四 夏下)
10. Festivals, Volume 05: Autumn, part 01 (祭五 秋上)
11. Festivals, Volume 06: Autumn, part 02 (祭六 秋下)
12. Festivals, Volume 07: Winter (祭七 冬)

The surviving text of the Matsuri (festival) volumes documents Suwa Shrine's hunting-related doctrines and rites, including the kajikimen talismans, which absolved the bearer of the ritual impurity of eating venison, and the oshitate mikari rite, the latter also mentioned in the Shintōshū.

== Manuscripts and printed editions ==
=== Manuscripts of the text ===
While the original twelve scrolls containing the illustrations are now lost, the text is preserved in a number of manuscripts. Some of these are:

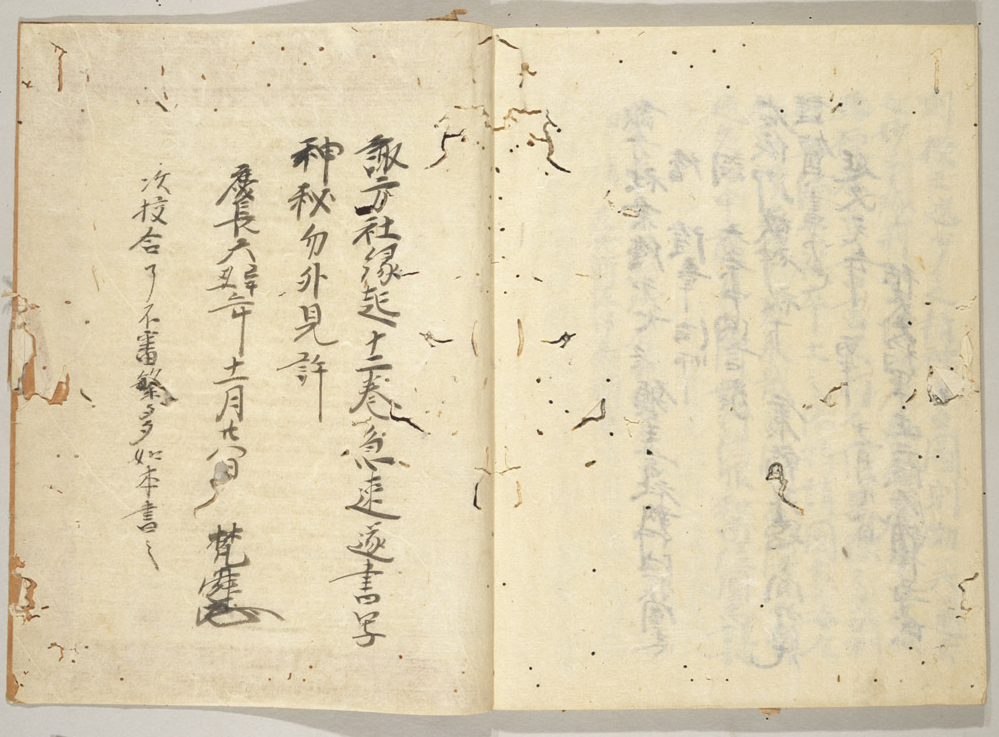
Colophon of the Bonshun manuscript of the Ekotoba. The title Suwa-sha Engi (諏方社縁起) can be seen in the rightmost column, with the date of copying and Bonshun's name (慶長_{辛丑}六年十一月廿八日 梵舜) on the third column from the right.

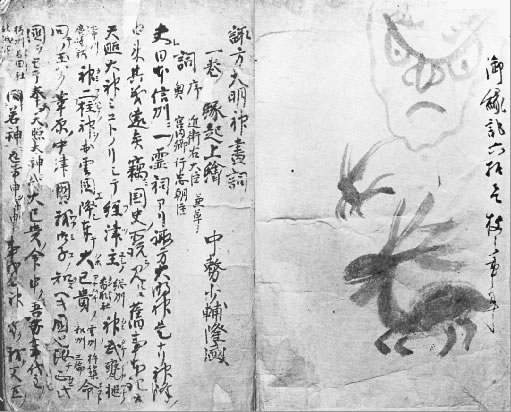
The first pages of the Gon-hōri-bon. The title of the work is given here as Suwa Daimyōjin Ekotoba (Kyūjitai: 諏方大明神畫詞).

- Bonshun-bon (梵舜本): Written in 1601 (Keichō 6) by a monk named Bonshun (梵舜), currently in the possession of Tokyo National Museum. The text exhibits certain characteristics which suggest it was copied directly from the actual scrolls. This copy is entitled Suwa Engi Emaki (諏方縁起絵巻), thought to be the work's original title.
- Gon-hōri-bon (権祝本): Written in 1472 (Bunmei 4) by Sōjun (宗詢), a monk from the Ina district of Shinano who transcribed a two-volume handwritten copy of the text made by a monk of Shicchi-in Temple in Mount Kōya, Jōen (盛円), who was a native of Suwa. This particular manuscript came into the possession of the Yajima clan, who served as gon-hōri (one of the five assistant priests to the ōhōri) of the Suwa Kamisha. From the Yajima, the Gon-hōri-bon passed into the ownership of the Moriya clan (another priestly family of the Suwa Kamisha) in 1847.
  The oldest surviving manuscript of the text (albeit one generation removed from it), the Gon-hōri-bon is the source for all other surviving copies and most printed editions. The work's more well-known title, Suwa Daimyōjin Ekotoba (諏方大明神画詞), derives from this manuscript.
  At some point before the early to mid-19th century, certain pages in the latter half of the Matsuri section have been rebound in incorrect order. Copies of the Gon-hōri manuscript text from the 1830s onwards and printed editions based on them reflect this error.
- Jinchō-bon (神長本): A copy of the Gon-hōri-bon made during the Muromachi period. The Jinchō manuscript notably features a different, more detailed version of the Matsuri portion of the text, suggesting that this section was edited for use by the Moriya jinchōkan, the priest responsible for overseeing the religious rites of the Suwa Kamisha. The title is given in this copy as Suwa Daimyōjin Go-engi Shidai (諏訪大明神御縁起次第).
- Takei-hōri-bon (武居祝本): A copy written by Kanasashi (Imai) Nobuhisa (金刺（今井）信古, died 1859), Takei-hōri of the Lower Shrine (Shimosha) of Suwa, during the late Edo period, based on the text passed down in his family collated with the Gon-hōri-bon and the Jinchō-bon.
- Ōhōri-bon (大祝本): One of two copies of the Gon-hōri manuscript text made by gon-hōri Yajima Tsunamasa (矢島綱政, died 1657) and passed down within the Suwa ōhōri line. The Engi section of this manuscript is arranged in a different order from that of the Gon-hōri-bon.

=== In print ===
The earliest printed edition of the Ekotoba is that included in the Zoku Gunsho Ruijū, volume 73. This edition is based on late copies of the Gon-hōri-bon that reflect the defective page order of the original. The text of the Gon-hōri-bon itself has been published in a number of anthologies, with the defect in the manuscript usually corrected. The Bonshun manuscript, meanwhile, is the basis for the text published by Koten Bunko in 1971.

Kanai (1982) features the text of the Bonshun and Gon-hōri manuscripts compared with each other.

== Related texts ==
A Shinto-Buddhist liturgical eulogy (講式 kōshiki) to the god of Suwa known as the Suwa Daimyōjin Kōshiki (諏方大明神講式), surviving in a late 15th century manuscript transcribed in Kōzan-ji in Kyoto, is believed to have been composed by Enchū around the same time as the Ekotoba.

== See also ==
- Japanese painting
- Moreya

== Bibliography ==
- Kanai, Tenbi (1982). 諏訪信仰史 (Suwa-shinkō-shi) (in Japanese). Meicho Shuppan. ISBN 978-4626001245.
- Muraoka, Geppo (1969). 諏訪の祭神 (Suwa no saijin) (in Japanese). Tokyo: Yūzankaku-shuppan.
- Shintō Taikei Hensankai, ed. (1982). 神道大系 神社編３０ 諏訪 (Shintō Taikei Jinja-hen, 30: Suwa) (in Japanese). Tokyo: Shintō Taikei Hensankai.
- Suwa Shishi Hensan Iinkai, ed. (1995). 諏訪市史 上巻 原始・古代・中世 (Suwa Shishi, vol. 1: Genshi, Kodai, Chūsei) (in Japanese). Suwa.
- Yazaki, Takenori, ed. (1986). 諏訪大社 (Suwa Taisha). Ginga gurafikku sensho (in Japanese). Vol. 4. Ginga shobō.
