= Moreya =

Japanese god

Moriya-no-Kami (Moreya-no-Kami)
- Indigenous kami of the Lake Suwa area
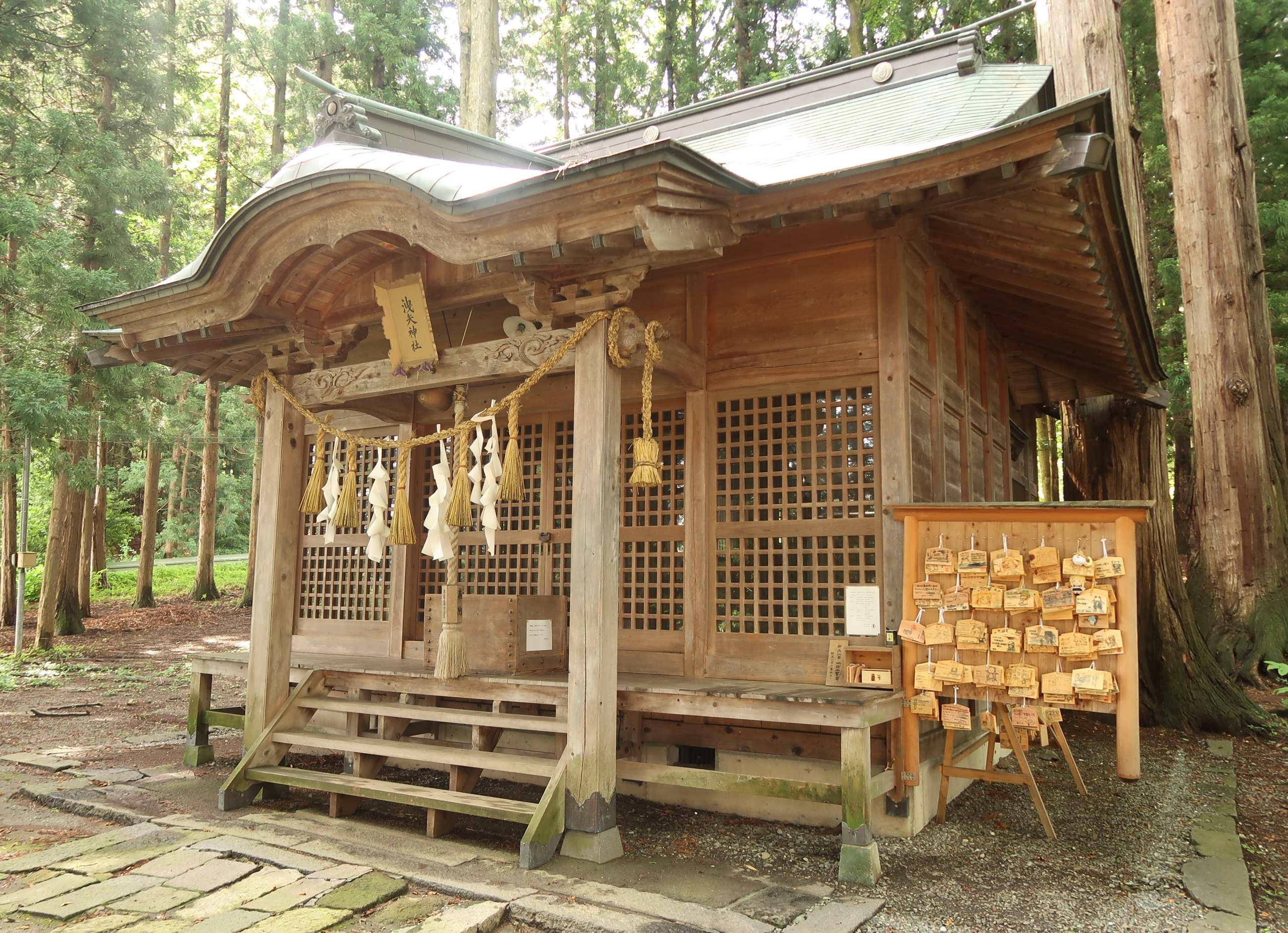
- Moriya Shrine in Okaya, Nagano Prefecture
- Other names: Moriya (Moreya)-no-Ōkami (洩矢大神); Moriya Daimyōjin (洩矢大明神 / 守屋大明神) "Minister Moriya" (守屋大臣, Moriya Daijin) "Moriya the wicked outlaw" (洩矢の悪賊, Moriya no akuzoku)
- Japanese: 洩矢神, 守矢神, 守屋神, 守宅神
- Major cult center: Moriya Shrine
- Texts: Suwa Daimyōjin Ekotoba, Suwa Nobushige Gejō, Jinchō Moriya-shi Keifu

Genealogy
- Children: Moriya / Morita (son; Jinchō Moriya-shi Keifu); Tamaruhime (daughter; Jinchō Moriya-shi Keifu); Chikatō (son; local legend - grandson in the Jinchō Moriya-shi Keifu)

Moreya or Moriya (洩矢神, Moriya- / Moreya-no-Kami) is a Japanese god who appears in various myths and legends of the Suwa region in Nagano Prefecture (historical Shinano Province). The most famous of such stories is that of his battle against Takeminakata, the god of the Grand Shrine of Suwa (Suwa Taisha).

Moriya is regarded as the mythical ancestor of the Moriya clan (守矢氏), a priestly family that formerly served in the Upper Suwa Shrine (上社, Kamisha), one of the two sub-shrines that make up Suwa Taisha. In addition, he is venerated as a local tutelary deity (ubusunagami) in a shrine in Okaya City near the Tenryū River, which in later variants of the aforementioned myth is identified as the place where Takeminakata and Moriya fought each other.

Whereas local historians have traditionally interpreted the myth as a mythologized account of a historical struggle between a powerful local polity in the Lake Suwa region and its environs, associated with the Moriya, and an incoming group identified with the Suwa clan, the high priestly lineage of the Upper Suwa Shrine, alternative interpretations have questioned this historical reading. One view holds that the myth was gradually influenced by medieval traditions concerning the historical conflict between Prince Shōtoku and the anti-Buddhist ōmuraji Mononobe no Moriya. Another proposes that the myth is of comparatively late origin and was constructed on the basis of this Shōtoku–Moriya narrative, with Mononobe no Moriya serving as the model for the local deity Moriya.

== Name ==
What is currently the most commonly used rendering of Moriya's name in kanji, 洩矢, appear in sources such as the Suwa Daimyōjin Ekotoba (1356) and the genealogical record of the Moriya family compiled during the early Meiji period (late 19th century) known as the Jinchō Moriya-shi Keifu (神長守矢氏系譜, "Genealogy of the Jinchō Moriya Clan"). It is also the rendering adopted by Moriya Shrine (洩矢神社) in Okaya City in Nagano, where the deity is enshrined. A number of other texts (see below) meanwhile refer to the god as Moriya Daijin (守屋大臣), an epithet more often used for the historical Mononobe no Moriya in medieval and later sources.

== Background ==
=== Suwa Shrine and its priesthood ===
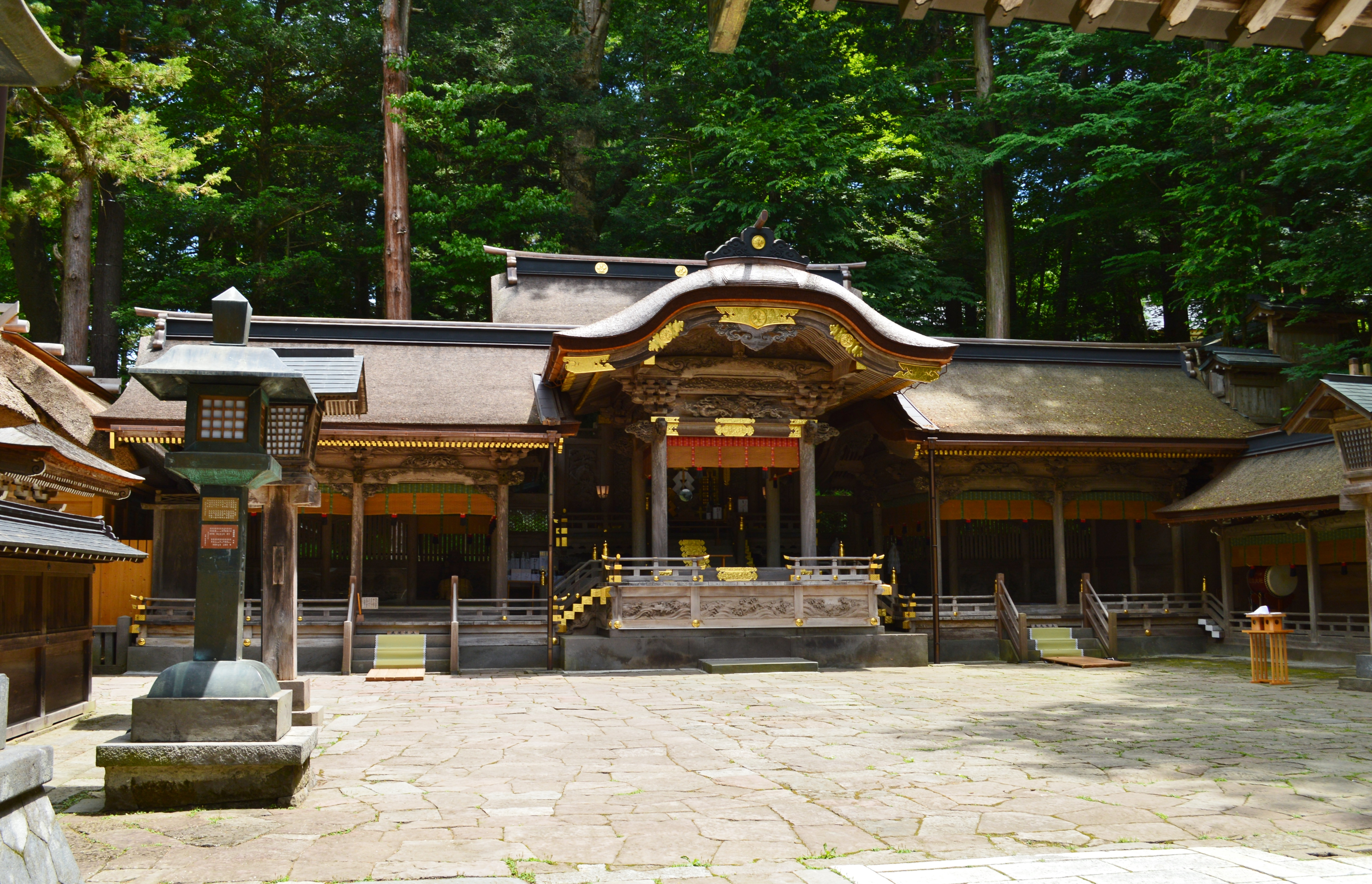
The Upper Shrine of Suwa's Main Shrine (上社本宮, Kamisha Honmiya), located in Suwa City

The Grand Shrine of Suwa (Suwa Taisha) in Nagano Prefecture consists of four shrines grouped into two sites: the Upper Shrine (上社, Kamisha), located southeast of Lake Suwa, in the cities of Chino and Suwa, and the Lower Shrine (下社, Shimosha), located in the town of Shimosuwa in the northern side of the lake. Historically, the Upper and Lower Suwa Shrines essentially functioned as two separate entities, each with its own set of shrines, religious ceremonies, and priests.

Before the rise of State Shinto in the Meiji period, the position of head priest or Ōhōri (大祝) in the Upper Shrine was occupied by members of the Suwa clan (諏訪氏, Suwa-shi), also known as the Miwa or Jin (神氏, Jinshi / Miwa-shi). The Suwa clan traditionally traced its lineage either to the shrine's deity Takeminakata, also known as Suwa Daimyōjin (諏訪大明神), the "Great Deity of Suwa," or through his chosen first priest, usually given the name 'Arikazu' (有員) in medieval texts. The holder of the highest priestly office was regarded as a deity manifested in human form (arahitogami), the living manifestation or "divine body" (shintai) of Suwa Daimyōjin.

The second-highest priestly office was that of the Kan-no-Osa or Jinchō (神長), later known as the Jinchōkan (神長官), a hereditary position held by the Moriya clan, who regarded themselves as the ritual successors and heirs of the god Moriya. The officeholder presided over ceremonies at the Upper Shrine, including the investiture of the Ōhōri, and consequently occupied a prominent position in the shrine hierarchy. He also had the prerogative of summoning and installing the Mishaguji (divine spirits associated with certain Upper Shrine rites) in objects that served as their vessels (yorishiro), and of dismissing them when the rites were concluded.

== Mythology ==
=== Moriya and Suwa Daimyōjin ===
The most famous story involving Moriya is that of his battle against Takeminakata / Suwa Daimyōjin, who is said to have come to the Suwa region seeking to dwell there or to conquer it. One version of this myth involves the Suwa deity or his subordinate defeating Moriya, described as armed with an iron ring or hook, using only a wisteria (藤, fuji) branch or vine. Another variant has Suwa Daimyōjin and/or his companion or avatar, the boy Arikazu, defeating Moriya in battle.

==== In the Suwa Daimyōjin Ekotoba ====
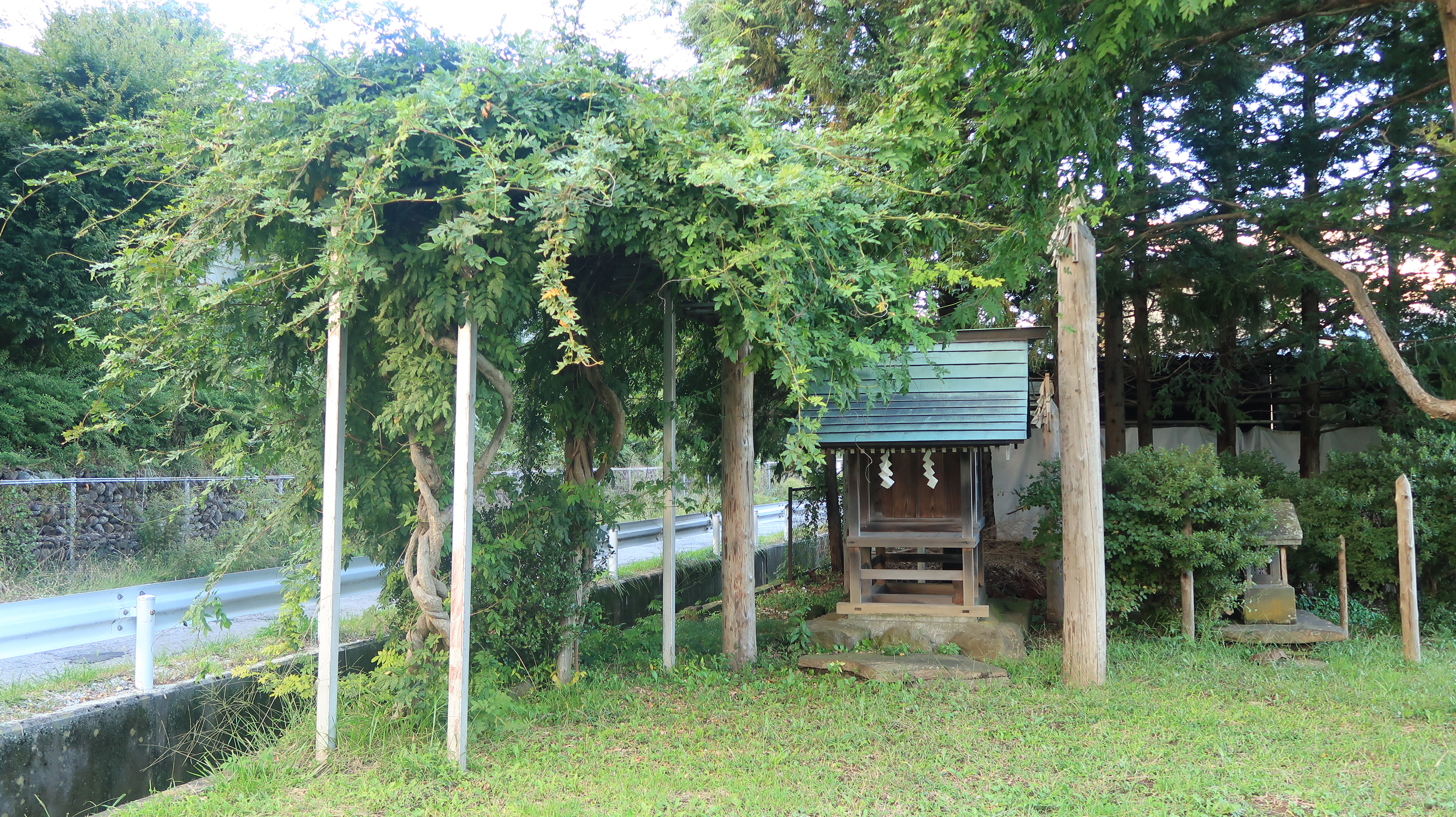
Fujishima Shrine (藤島社) in Nakasu, Suwa, one of the Upper Shrine of Suwa's auxiliary shrines

What is perhaps the most well-known version of the story is found in the 1356 text Suwa Daimyōjin Ekotoba, where it is recorded as the origin myth of Fujishima Shrine (藤島社, Fujishima-sha) in Suwa City, one of the Upper Shrine's auxiliary shrines where its yearly rice-planting ceremony is traditionally held.

Now, as for the deity of Fujishima [Shrine] (藤嶋ノ明神, Fujishima no Myōjin):
In ancient times, when the venerable god (尊神, sonjin, i.e. Suwa Myōjin) first manifested himself, Moriya the wicked outlaw (洩矢ノ惡賊, Moriya no akuzoku), seeking to prevent the divine occupation of the land, took up an iron ring (鐵輪) to fight him, but the Myōjin picked up a wisteria branch and subdued [Moriya]. In the end, he cast down the evil ring (邪輪, jarin) and caused the true Dharma (正法, shōbō) to flourish. When the Myōjin made a vow and threw the wisteria branch [to the ground], immediately it took root, its branches and leaves flourished, and its flowers bloomed brilliantly, leaving the battlefield as a sign for all generations to come. For this reason he is known as the Myōjin of Fujishima ('Wisteria Island'). (Note: 抑コノ藤嶋ノ明神ト申ハ、尊神垂迹ノ昔、洩矢ノ惡賊神居ヲサマタケントセシ時、洩矢ハ鐵輪ヲ持シテアラソヒ、明神ハ藤枝ヲトリテ是ヲ伏シ給フ。ツイニ邪輪ヲ降シテ正法ヲ興ス。 明神誓ヲ發テ、藤枝ヲナケ給シカハ、則根ヲサシテ枝葉ヲサカヘ、花蘂アサヤカニシテ、戰場ノシルシヲ萬代ニ殘ス。藤嶋ノ明神ト号スル此ユヘナリ。)

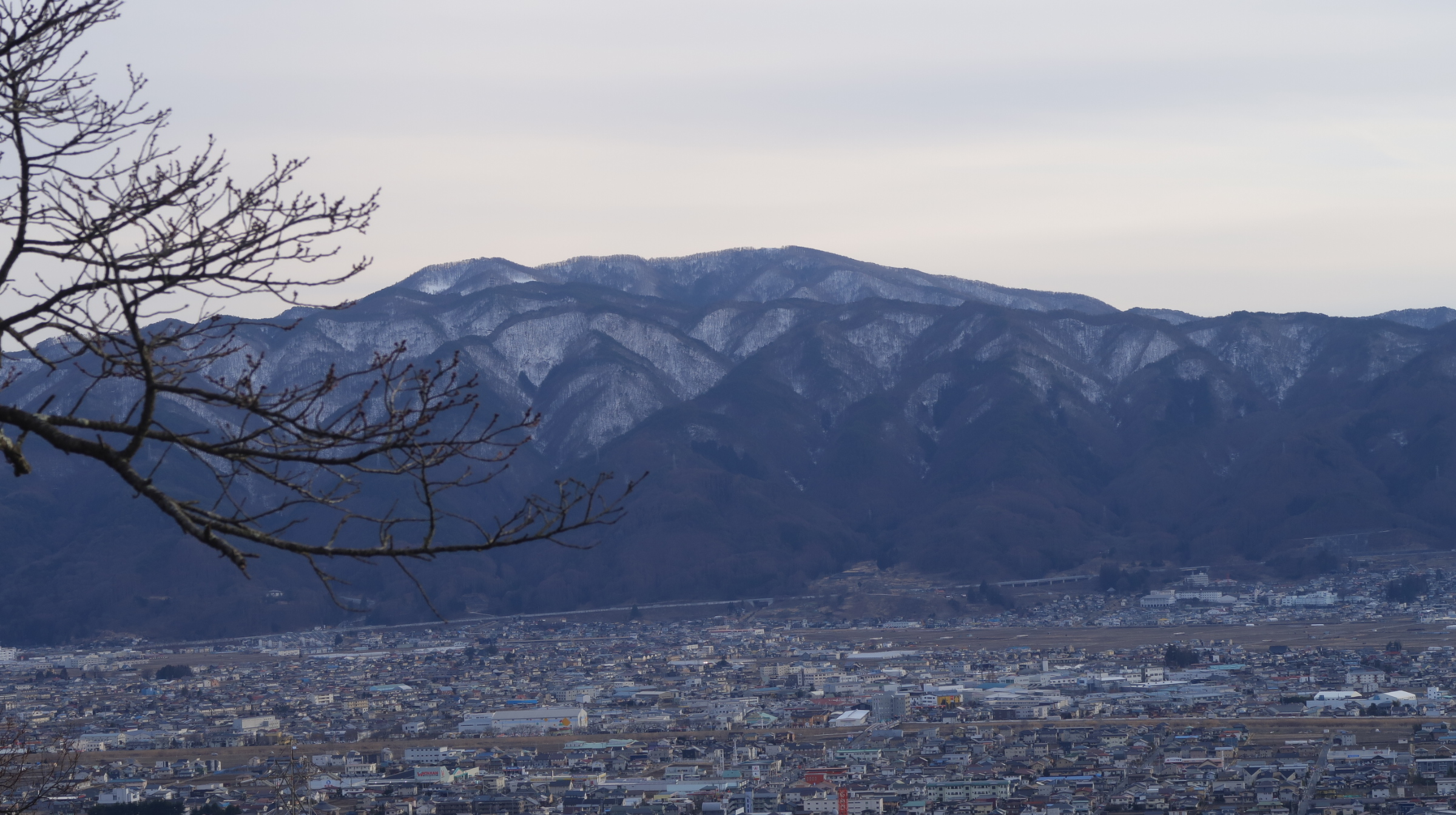
Mount Moriya as seen from Tateishi Park (立石公園) in Suwa City

The myth also appears in the Suwa Daimyōjin Kōshiki (諏方大明神講式), a Shinto-Buddhist liturgical eulogy (講式, kōshiki) attributed to Suwa (Kosaka) Enchū (1295–1364), the author of the Ekotoba. The text incorporates the story into a medieval legend in which the deity is said to have been an Indian king who attained enlightenment and later manifested as a kami in Japan. Moriya is identified as an incarnation of the demon king (魔王, Maō), who opposed him first in India in the form of a rebellious vassal and later in Japan as “Moriya the evil outlaw” (洩矢惡賊). After his defeat, Moriya fled to Moriyagatake (洩矢ヶ嶽, “Moriya’s peak”), known today as Mount Moriya. The work then draws a parallel between the deity and Mononobe no Moriya, prefiguring the later conflation of the two figures:

Mononobe no Moriya was an enemy of Buddhism. Prince Jōgū (Shōtoku) executed him, causing the Sun of Wisdom to shine over the village of Wakaki (若木郷, lit. "Village of Young Trees"). [Likewise,] this Yamabe (?) no Moriya (山家洩矢) is the nemesis of the divine. The Deity of this shrine punished him, causing his majesty to be displayed splendidly throughout the realm of Fusō. Though these rebels differ in outward form, their names are uncannily alike.

==== In the Suwa Nobushige Gejō ====
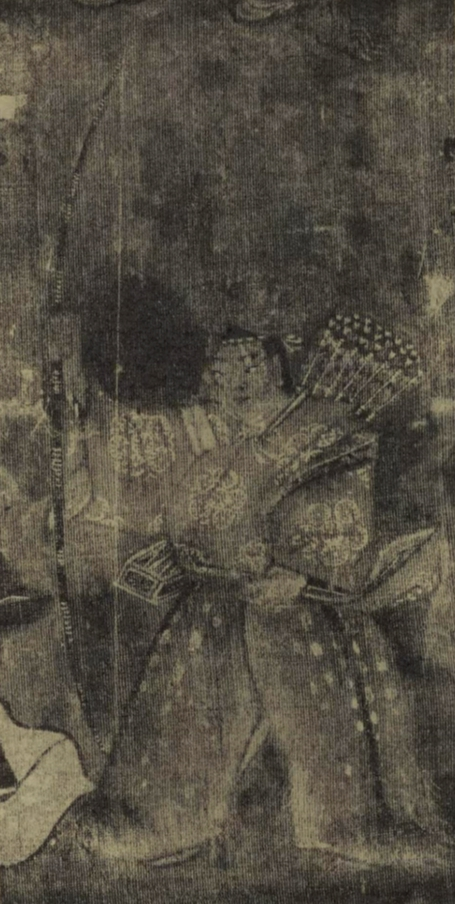
Suwa Daimyōjin as a warrior in hunting gear

The Suwa Nobushige Gejō (諏訪信重解状, “Petition of Suwa Nobushige”) is purportedly a formal petition submitted to the Kamakura shogunate in 1249 (Hōji 3) by Suwa Nobushige, then Ōhōri of the Upper Suwa Shrine, and contains a somewhat different version of the myth. The document is now generally regarded as apocryphal, with its composition dated to no earlier than the following (14th) century.

On the [Deity's] Manifestation at the Foot of Mount Moriya (守屋山麓御垂跡事)

Upon reverent examination of ancient traditions (舊貫), [it appears that] this place (砌, migiri) was once the domain of the Minister Moriya (守屋大臣, Moriya Daijin). When the great god (大神, i.e. Suwa Myōjin) came down from heaven, the Minister attempted to prevent the Myōjin from residing here, striving to repel him. The Myōjin, in turn, devised a secret plan to make this land his own. This led to disputes, and then to outright battles, with neither side able to claim victory.

Hereupon, the Myōjin brought forth a wisteria hook (藤鎰), while the Minister wielded an iron hook (鐵鎰). Anchoring them into the [contested] ground, they pulled [against one another]; the Myōjin, with his wisteria hook, emerged victorious in this martial contest. He then cast out and punished Minister Moriya.

From the time he chose this shrine as his abode until now, hundreds of years have passed, during which the fame of our god has spread throughout the land. The traces [of his miraculous deeds] remain fresh even today.

The Myōjin planted the wisteria hook in front of this shrine, and it grew and flourished, becoming known as the "Forest of Fujisuwa" (藤諏訪之森). Twice a year, sacred rites are performed there. Since then, this district has been named 'Suwa' (諏方). (Note: 一 守屋山麓御垂跡事 右謹檢舊貫、當砌昔者守屋大臣之所領也、大神天降御之刻、大臣者奉禦明神之居住、勵制止之方法、明神者廻可爲御敷地之祕計、或致諍論、或及合戰之處、兩方難決雌雄、爰明神者持藤鎰、大臣者以鐵鎰、懸此所引之、明神即以藤鎰令勝得軍陣之諍論給、而間令追罰守屋大臣、卜居所當社以來、遙送數百歲星霜、久施我神之稱譽天下給、應跡之方々是新哉、明神以彼藤鎰自令植當社之前給、藤榮枝葉號藤諏訪之森、毎年二ヶ度御神事勤之、自尓以來以當郡名諏方、)

==== In other late medieval texts ====
The Jinshi Keizu (神氏系図, “Genealogy of the Jin [Miwa] Clan”), a Suwa clan genealogy attributed to Suwa Sadamichi (諏訪貞通), Enchū’s third great-grandson and the copyist of the extant Kōshiki manuscript, records a tradition recounting how the Suwa deity and the eight-year-old Arikazu (有員), the legendary founder of the Suwa priestly lineage, defeated “Moriya” (守屋) at Mount Moriya during the reign of Emperor Yōmei (585–587), closely paralleling the historical conflict between Prince Shōtoku and Mononobe no Moriya.

The Deity's arrival in Suwa District of Shinano Province occurred during the reign of the 32nd human sovereign, Emperor Yōmei. At that time, there was an eight-year-old boy (later styled Arikazu) who accompanied the Myōjin. Moriya (守屋) opposed the great god, and a battle took place at Mount Moriya. The boy, leading divine troops, routed Moriya. Then, at the foot of that mountain, he established a sanctuary. (Note: 神幸信州諏方郡者、人皇卅二代用明天皇御宇也。于時、有八歳童子_{後字有員}而令隨遂明神守屋奉諍。大神至守屋山、有御合戰。童子率神兵、追落守屋。則于彼山麓構社壇。)

The same legend is found in another genealogical text titled the Miwa-ke / Jinke Keizu (神家系図, "Genealogy of the House of Miwa / Jin") or the Ōhōri-ke Keizu (大祝家系図, "Genealogy of the Ōhōri House"), (Note: "During the reign of Emperor Yōmei, when the Daimyōjin manifested in Suwa District of Shinano Province, he took the form of a child named Arikazu and had him accompany him. At that time, Moriya, the minister of the same district, opposed him. When the Daimyōjin arrived and proceeded to Mount Moriya, the minister engaged him in battle. Arikazu accompanied the Daimyōjin and took part in the fighting, ultimately driving the minister away. A sanctuary was then established at the foot of Mount Moriya, where Suwa Daimyōjin manifested. Arikazu thereafter became the first priest (祝, hōri) and performed rites of worship. It is said that the Daimyōjin was an incarnation of Samantabhadra, while Arikazu was an incarnation of Mañjuśrī." (用明天皇御宇、大明神影向信濃國諏方郡之時、爲有員童子形体、令御共也。爰同郡守屋大臣奉諍。大明神御來臨之間、至守屋山、彼大臣與大明神在御合戰。于時、有員令御共致合戰、忠追落大臣。則於守屋山麓構社壇、令化現諏訪大明神。即有員始而爲祝奉成祭禮者也。豈大明神者普賢、有員者文殊師利菩薩化身云々。)) and the Ten'in Goroku (天陰語録), a Muromachi period work authored by the Rinzai monk Ten'in Ryūtaku (天隠龍沢, 1422-1500). (Note: "When the deity manifested in Shinano Province, it was during the reign of the thirty-second sovereign, Emperor Yōmei, at the time when Buddhism was spreading eastward. There was an eight-year-old boy named Arikazu who accompanied the deity to Shinano. The minister Moriya opposed them. The boy, leading divine troops, fought vigorously and defeated Moriya, who abandoned his armor and fled. The boy pursued him as far as the foot of Moriya's stronghold." (神之顯於科野國者。人皇卅二代用明天皇佛法東流之時也。有八歲童子。其名爲有員。隨神以信州也。大臣守屋拒之。童子率兵神以力戰。守屋敗績。弃甲以走。童子追之。就守屋城下。)) These two works name Suwa Daimyōjin's opponent 'Minister Moriya' (守屋大臣 / 大臣守屋), in agreement with the Nobushige Gejō.

==== In Edo period texts ====
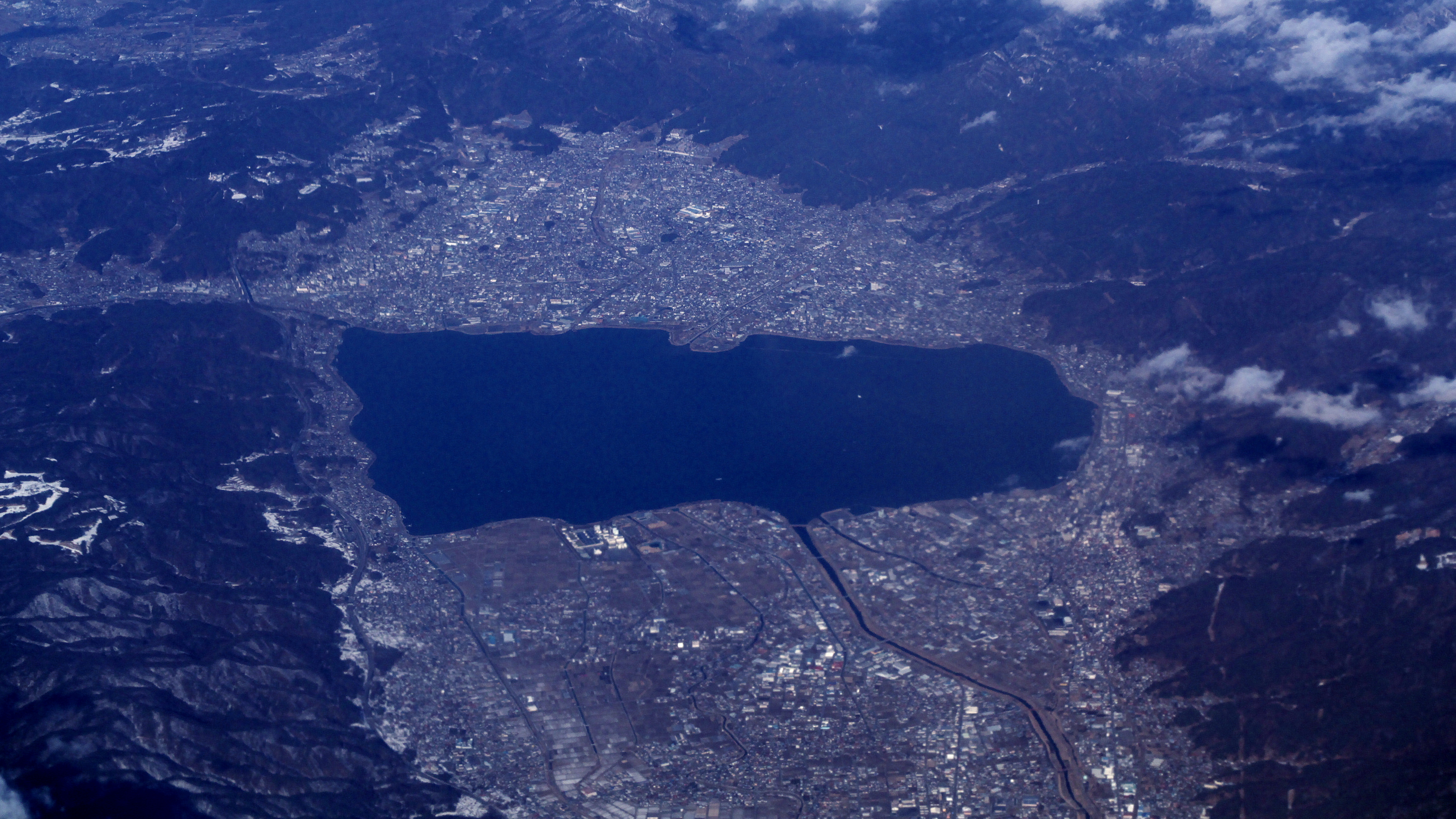
Lake Suwa

A kōshiki from Suwa Shrine surviving in three late 17th century manuscripts titled Suwa Kō-no-shiki (諏方講之式 / 諏訪講之式) presents a version of the myth closely resembling that found in the Nobushige Gejō, in which 'Minister Moriya' (守屋ノ大臣) and the Suwa deity compete in a contest using hooks (鑰, kagi) of wisteria and iron. The text also provides an etymology for the name 'Suwa'.

When [the Suwa deity] first manifested at this shrine, there was in this district of Yamabe (?) (山家郡) a local tutelary deity called Minister Moriya (守屋ノ大臣, Moriya no Daijin). [The deity] disputed with the Minister over possession of this land. The Myōjin possessed a wisteria hook (藤鑰), while the Minister had an iron hook (鐵鑰). They agreed to settle the matter by a contest using these, with the victor becoming the lord of the land. They then pulled on the hook and chain, and the wisteria hook emerged victorious. The Myōjin then said, "Ah (suwa (Note: Historical orthography: suha (すは). A cry of amazement, surprise or wonder.)), I have won!" For this reason, the name of the district was changed from Yamabe (?) to Suwa.
The wisteria hook was then planted in that place. It has never withered, and is therefore called Fujishima Myōjin. Its flowers are five-colored and exceptionally beautiful. They reveal [the deity's] original nature and demonstrates the unchanging nature of his sacred manifestation. Its beauty will endure for ten thousand years—what a marvel it is! (Note: 當社御垂跡ノ初 於_{二}此山家郡_{一}本有_{二}一リノ地主_{一} 号_{二}守屋ノ大臣ト_{一} 與_{二}大臣_{一}相諍_{三}領_{二}此地_{一} 然則明神有_{二}藤鑰_{一} 大臣ニ有_{二}鐵鑰_{一} 以_{二}兩鑰_{一}决シ_{二}於雌雄_{一} 任テ_{二}其勝負ニ_{一}擬_{二}定領主タランコトヲ_{一} 時ニ鈎鏁牽シ已ニ得タリ_{二}藤鑰勝ツヲ_{一} 明神□_{レ}時須和吾勝ヌト云 因_{レ}之ニ改_{二}山家ノ名_{一}即号_{二}諏訪郡_{一} 彼以二藤鑰_{一}立タリ_{二}于其地トコロニ_{一} 於_{レ}今不_{二}枯槁_{一} 號_{二}藤嶋明神_{一} 華ハ五色ニ乄而濃艶タリ 是則表_{二}本色質_{一} 而以彰ス_{二}聖化不改_{一} 万歳ノ粧明ケン焉可_{二}思議_{一})

A version of the myth is recounted in a mid-19th century work by merchant and kokugaku scholar Matsuzawa Yoshiakira (1791-1861), the Ken'yū Hongi (顕幽本記, "Fundamental Records of the Visible and Invisible [Realms]"). It portrays Moriya (守屋神) as the original ruler of Suwa, who resists the arrival of Suwa Daimyōjin until he is defeated by Fujishima Daimyōjin, the deity's emissary.

The deity called Fujishima Daimyōjin is so named because, when the Great Deity (大御神) designated this place to be his inner province (内縣) and was considering constructing a great shrine (or 'palace') there, there was already a deity called Moriya-no-Kami (守屋神) who had long held dominion over this land. When Moriya obstructed and resisted the Great Deity, refusing to allow him to enter, the Great Deity ordered Fujishima Daimyōjin to defeat him. Moriya, unable to withstand his power, submitted to him and departed for another place. (Note: 藤島大明神と稱(タタフ)るは 大御神此地を内縣と定め玉ひ 大宮造り爲玉はむと思ほし食し時 守屋神といふ神元より此地を領ウシはきて在けるか 大御神を入れ奉らしと距(コバ)み防き奉りしかは 藤島大明神に詔(ノリ)玉ひて其を伐しめ玉ひけれは守屋神力及はて從ひ奉りて他所(ヨソ)に去れり)

A text preserved in the Moriya family archives titled "The Origin of Suwa Daimyōjin" (諏訪大明神由来, Suwa Daimyōjin Yurai) describes the god Takeminakata as displaying his strength to the warrior deities Futsunushi and Takemikazuchi during their mission to secure the transfer of Ashihara-no-Nakatsukuni to the heavenly deities. He eventually agrees to cede the land, after which the three travel to Suwa and defeat Moriya. This reflects a broader reinterpretation of the imperial kuni-yuzuri ("transfer of the land") myth in late medieval and early modern sources associated with Suwa Shrine, beginning with the Suwa Daimyōjin Ekotoba and Suwa Daimyōjin Kōshiki. These two texts, in contrast to the original version of the myth found in the Kojiki and the Sendai Kuji Hongi, present Takeminakata as voluntarily establishing his domain at Suwa. This reinterpretation was reflected in many Edo-period Suwa texts, including the Yurai.

==== In the Jinchō Moriya-shi Keifu ====
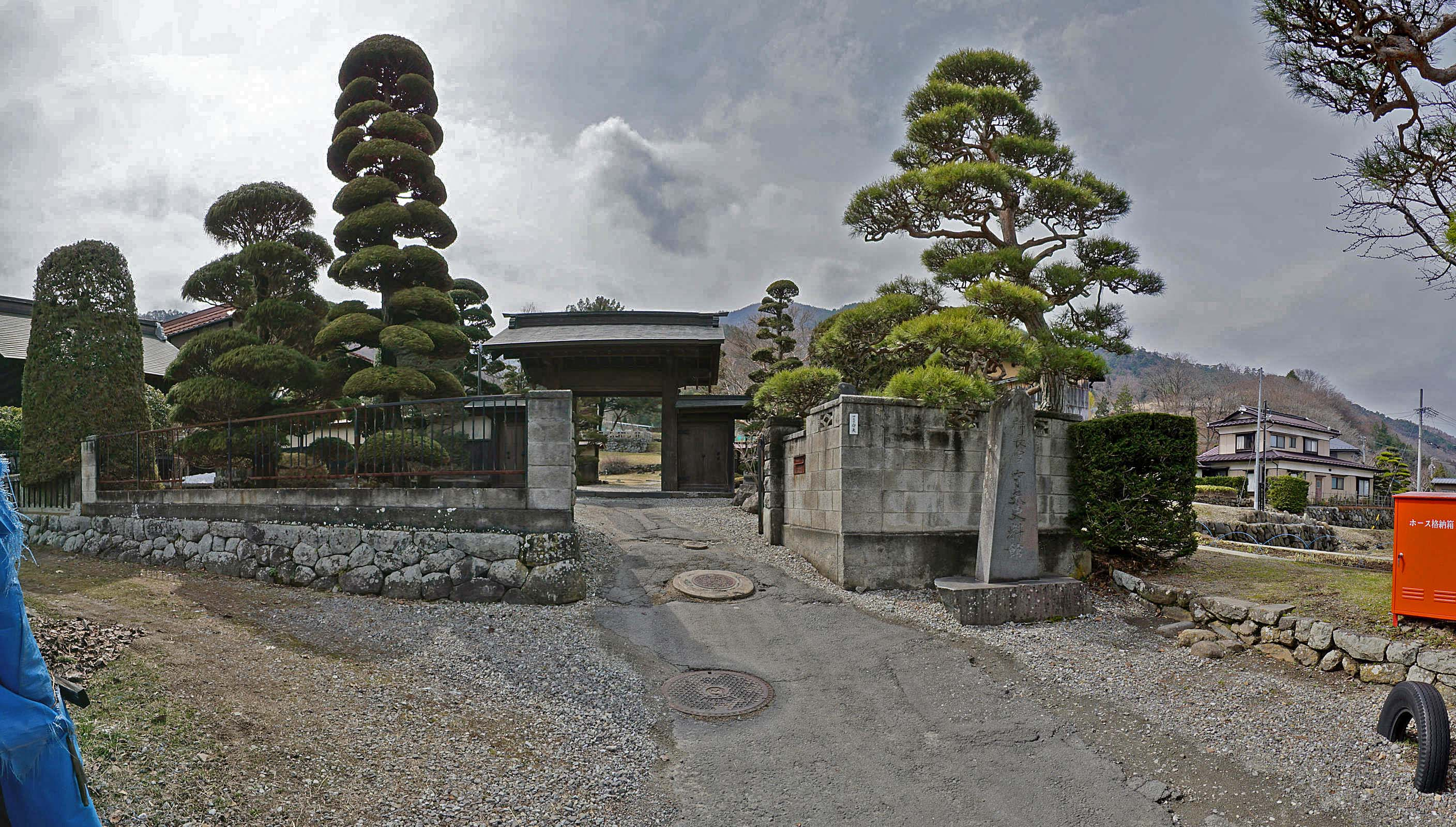
Entrance to the Moriya family estate and the Jinchōkan Moriya Historical Museum in Miyagawa, Chino City

In the late 19th century, Moriya Saneyoshi (守矢実久), the 76th Moriya clan head and the last person to serve at the Upper Shrine as Jinchōkan (hereditary priesthood having been abolished by the government in 1871), compiled a genealogy titled the Jinchō Moriya-shi Keifu (神長守矢氏系譜, "Genealogy of the Jinchō Moriya Clan"), which traces the family and their priestly office back to the mythic past.

The text notably weaves together the imperial kuni-yuzuri narrative and the local Moriya myth, as had already occurred in the earlier Suwa Daimyōjin Yurai. However, whereas the Yurai portrays Takeminakata as a powerful deity who sides with the heavenly messengers Futsunushi and Takemikazuchi and defeats Moriya alongside them, the Keifu describes 'Minakatatomi-no-Mikoto' as having "fled" to Suwa from the land of Izumo in accordance with the Kojiki (which first became known in Suwa during the early modern period).

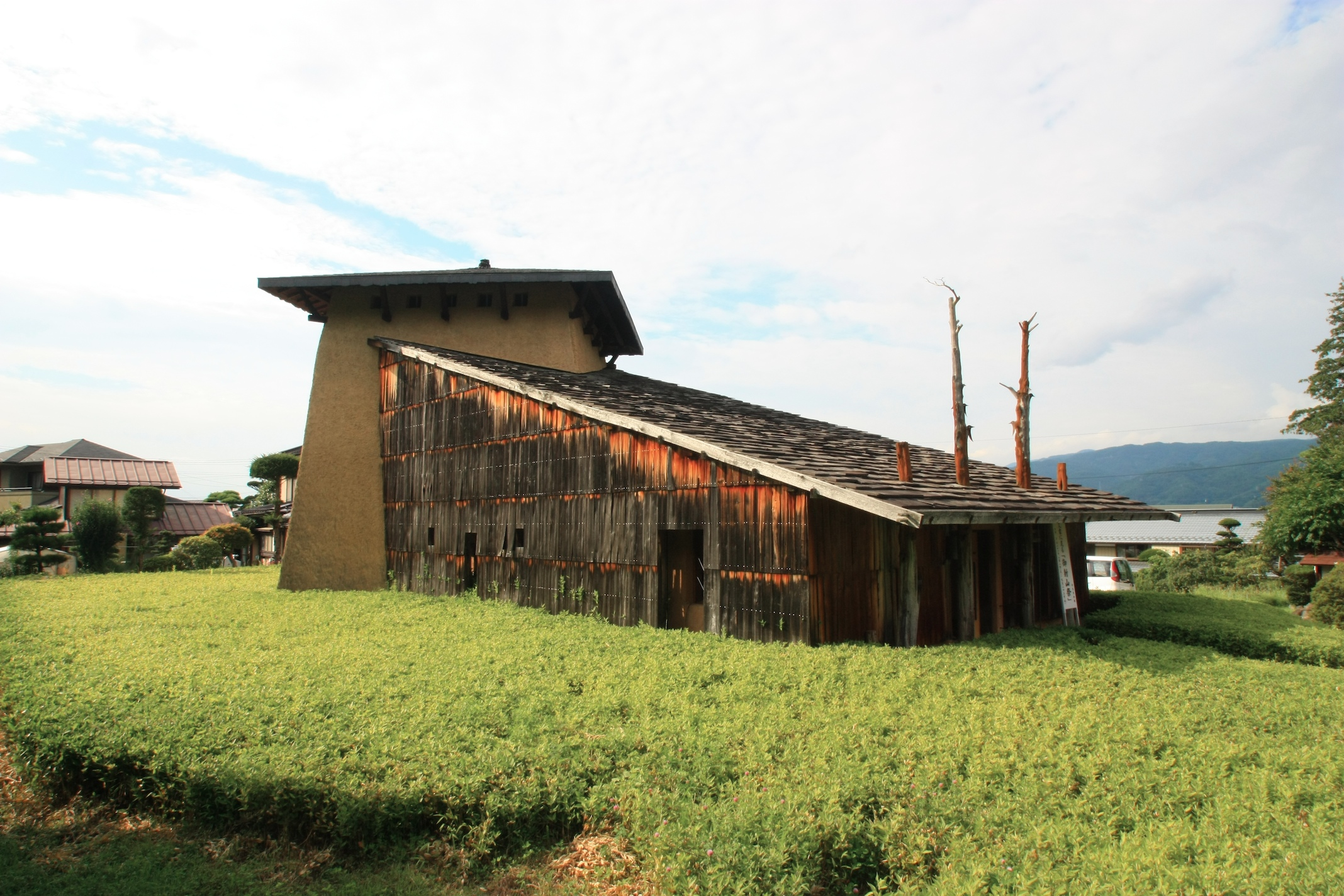
The Jinchōkan Moriya Historical Museum, built by architect Terunobu Fujimori

Moriya-no-Kami (洩矢神)

When Minakatatomi-no-Mikoto (御名方刀美命) fled from Izumo to the sea of Suwa, there was a god named Moriya who dwelt by its shores (a shrine to him exists in Hashibara Village (Note: Modern Hashibara District (part of Kawagishi-Higashi), Okaya City)) who opposed him. Although they fought each other using hooks of wisteria and iron (藤鑰鐵鑰), [Moriya] eventually submitted to the august might of Minakatatomi-no-Mikoto, declaring: "I shall offer up this land to my lord and forever be responsible for its religious rites and governance." Minakatatomi-no-Mikoto then recited the following song:

Kagoyumi no / mayumi o mochite / miya mamori / yatakegokoro ni / tsukau matsureyo
("Wielding your bow / made of spindle wood, / protect my dwelling (or 'shrine') / and attend to me / stout-heartedly!")

He then planted the wisteria [on the ground], which later grew and became known as the Forest of Fujisuwa (藤洲羽森). (Note: 洩矢神：御名方刀美命、逃出雲到于洲羽海之時、有洩矢神者居海畔(橋原村社有)拒之、藤國鑰鐵鑰以雖有互相爭事、遂服御名方富命御稜威、誓曰奉乎地永主命之祭政。御名方刀美命歌曰、鹿兒弓乃眞弓乎持弖宮滿茂里矢竹心爾仕布麻都連與。揷彼藤、後繫茂弖曰藤洲羽森。)

=== Other myths ===
==== Moriya and Yatsukao / Ganigawara ====
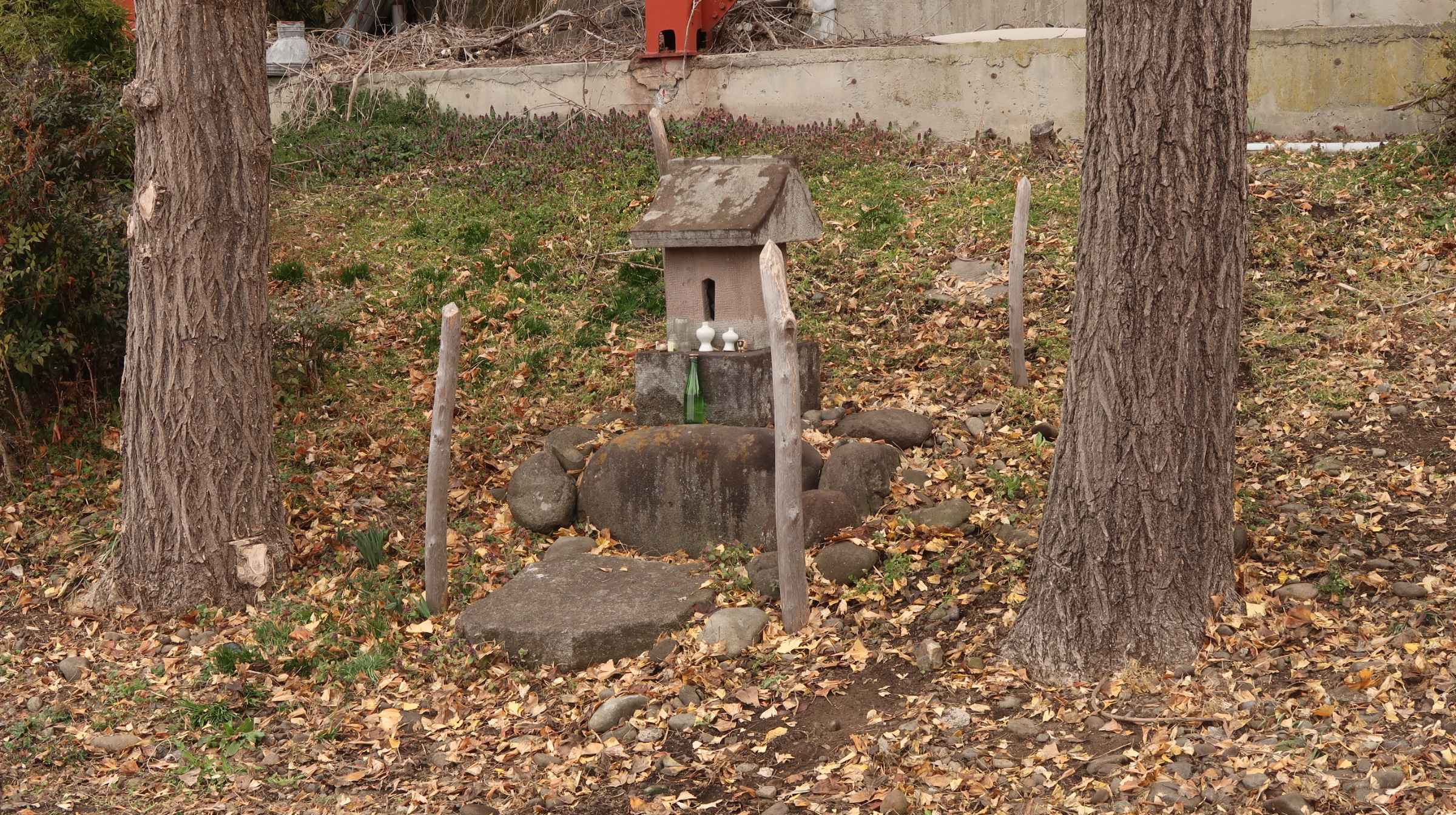
Tenpaku-Shime Shrine (天白七五三社) in Chinomachi, Chino City

A story found in a late source claims that Takeminakata and/or Moriya (Moreya) fought another local deity named Yatsukao-no-Mikoto (矢塚男命), who died during the conflict.

In the history of Tenpaku-Shime Shrine (天白七五三社) in the village of Eimei (永明村, part of modern Chinomachi, Chino), it is said:
An oral tradition relates that the shrine's deity, Yatsukao-no-Mikoto, dwelt in a cave in this area. When Takeminakata-no-Mikoto came to this land, he (Yatsukao?) fought against Moriya-no-Kami using his bow and arrow. When Yatsukao was struck by the arrow and was about to die, he said to Takeminakata-no-Mikoto: "I submit to you, O great god! I have a daughter whom I offer to you." Having said this, he died. (Note: 永明村天白七五三社由緒ニ、字宮渡祭神矢塚男命此地ニ穴居ス、健御名方命此國ニ到リシ時洩矢神ト弓矢を以テ戦フ、矢塚男其矢ニ中リテ死セントシ、建御名方命ニ云フ、我ハ大神ニ随フベシ、一女アリ献ラムト言ヒ終テ死ストノ口傳アリ (下畧))

A version of the story as retold by local author Nogiku Imai portrays Yatsukao, alias 'Ganigawara no Chōja' (蟹河原の長者), as a chieftain and horse breeder whose might and influence rivaled that of Moreya (Note: Imai's preferred reading of 洩矢.), one of the powerful chiefs of the region. After Moreya swore fealty to Takeminakata after his defeat, Ganigawara held Moreya in contempt for choosing to surrender and had his servants publicly revile him as a coward. Although their insults went unheeded at first, Ganigawara's men eventually resorted to violence, shooting arrows at the palace Moreya and other deities were erecting for Takeminakata. In retaliation, Takeminakata raised up an army and launched an all-out attack against Ganigawara with Moreya at his side. Ganigawara, mortally wounded by an arrow in the ensuing skirmish, repents in his deathbed and entrusts his youngest daughter to Takeminakata. Takeminakata gives her hand in marriage to a god who was injured by Ganigawara's messengers while guarding his palace.

==== The rain god of Mount Moriya ====
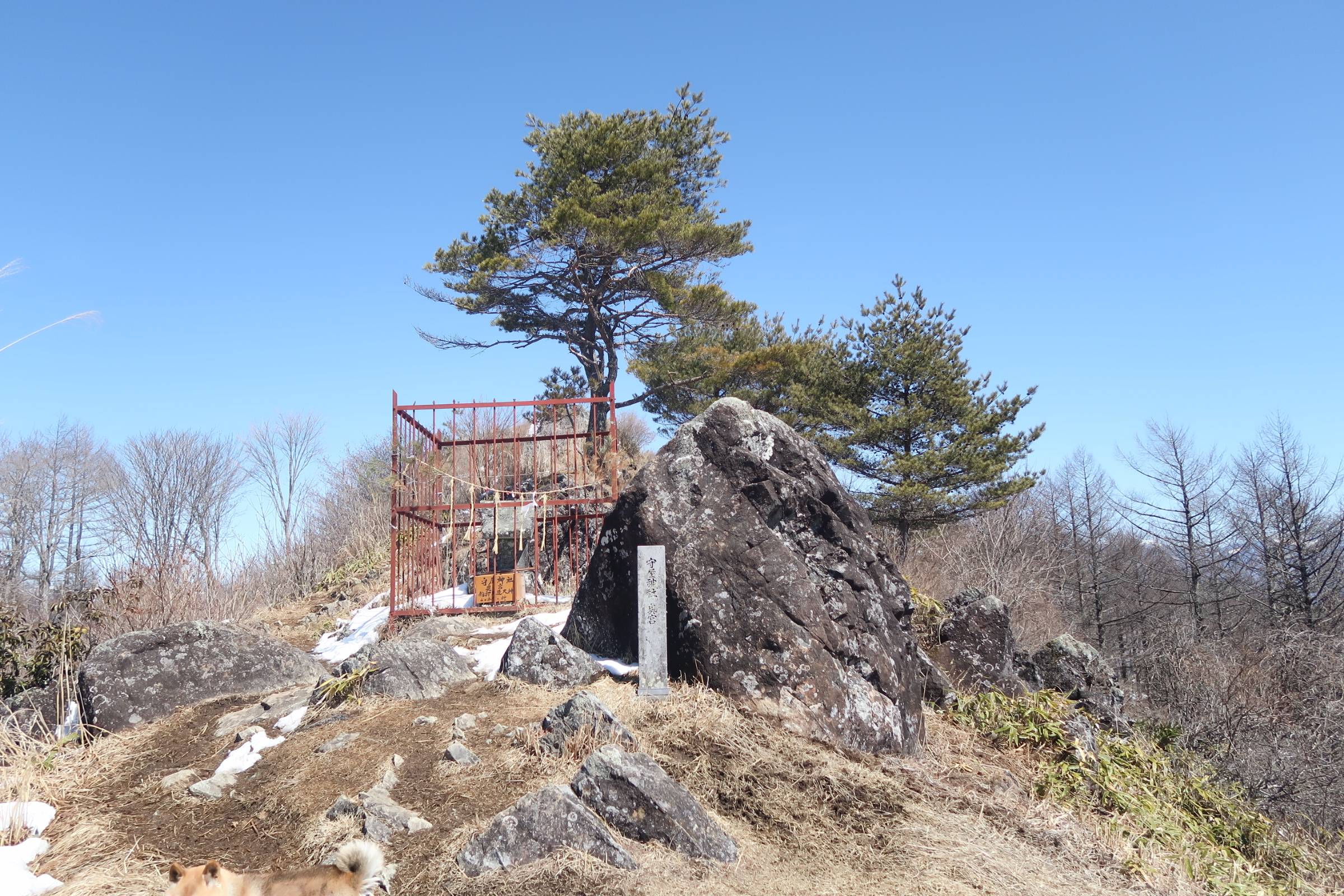
A hokora (fenced by a barricade) in the eastern peak of Mount Moriya dedicated to the deity 'Moriya Daijin', commonly identified with Mononobe no Moriya. The hokora was formerly subjected to ritual desecration by locals when rain was needed.

Behind the Upper Shrine, straddling the border between the cities of Suwa and Ina, stands the 1,650 metre-high Mount Moriya. On its eastern peak stands a miniature shrine or hokora enshrining a deity referred to in old documents as 'Moriya Daijin' (守矢大臣 or 守矢大神). The deity has been identified either with the Moriya of Suwa legend or the deified Mononobe no Moriya. The latter is enshrined on the southern side of the mountain at a shrine in the former town of Takatō (now part of Ina), whose shrine regards the summit hokora as its oku-no-miya (奥宮, lit. "inner shrine" or "rear shrine" (Note: Certain Shinto shrines - especially those dedicated to mountain deities - are composed of two or more sanctuaries, one of which, the satomiya (里宮, lit. "village shrine"), is located in or near civilization, with the other, the okumiya, being situated in a remote location such as higher up the mountain.)).

Moriya Daijin is considered to be a weather deity who causes rain to fall when angered. Local rainmaking rituals once involved provoking the god into sending rain by vandalizing the hokora or throwing it down the mountain side.

Popular belief holds that rain falls whenever clouds gather around the mountain top. A folk song advises people to prepare to mow the fields whenever the following signs of incoming rain are observed:

於自理皮礼 守矢敞雲乎 巻上而 百舌鳥義智奈哿婆 鎌遠登具倍斯 (Man'yōgana)
(おじり晴れ 守矢へ雲を 巻き上げて もずぎち鳴かば 鎌をとぐべし)
Ojiri hare / Moriya e kumo o / maki agete / mozu gichi nakaba / kama o togu beshi
"When the sun at Ojiri / pushes clouds / towards (Mount) Moriya / and the shrike (mozu) chatters / sharpen your sickles."

=== Offspring ===
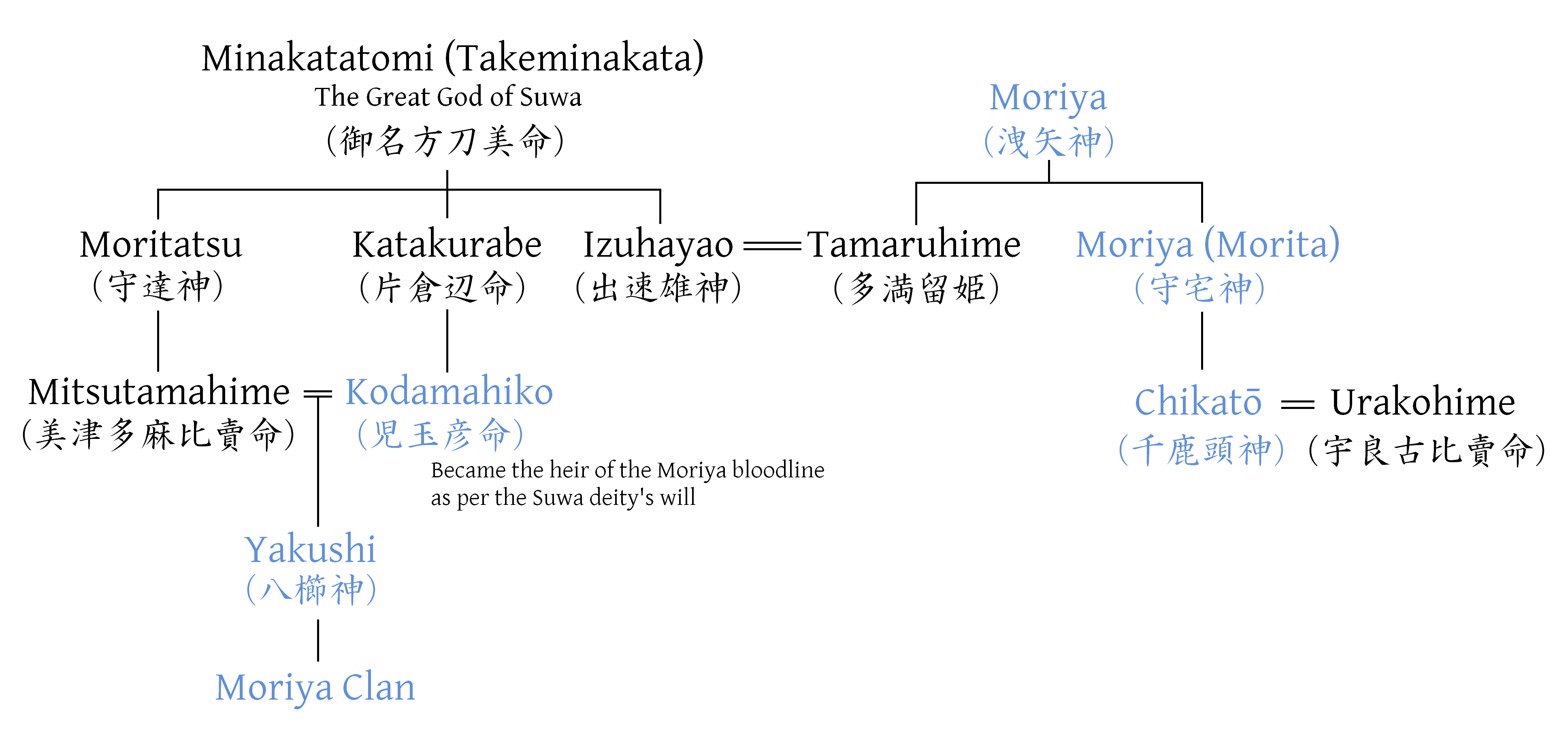
The first five generations of the Moriya clan according to the Jinchō Moriya-shi Keifu

One local tradition identifies Moriya as the father of the god Chikatō (千鹿頭神, also 'Chikato'), an obscure deity worshiped in a handful of shrines in the Suwa basin (specifically the cities of Chino and Suwa) and the neighboring municipalities of Tatsuno and Matsumoto.

The Jinchō Moriya-shi Keifu meanwhile claims him to have had two children, a daughter named Tamaruhime (多満留姫) and a son named Moriya (守宅神). (Note: "Moriya-no-Kami: Born with extraordinary spiritual powers and strength. He took up the bow and arrows on behalf of his father and accompanied the Great Deity on a hunt, obtaining a thousand deer. He had one son, whom he named Chikatō-no-Kami." (守宅神：生弖有靈異幹力、代父弖負弓矢、從大神遊獵得千鹿。有一男、名之曰千鹿頭神。)) Tamaruhime married Izuhayao (出速雄神), one of Takeminakata's sons, (Note: 洩矢神 (...) 有一男一女、女曰多滿留姫、嫁大神御子出速雄神。) while the younger Moriya had a son named Chikatō. Chikatō in turn married Urakohime (宇良古比売命), the goddess of Mount Urako (宇良古山), identified with Chikatō Shrine (千鹿頭神社) in Kanda / Satoyamabe, Matsumoto. (Note: "Chikatō Shrine: Enshrined at Aruga (有賀, part of modern Suwa City), Uehara (上原, modern Chino), Harada (原田, Chino), Yokobuki (横吹, modern Fujimi), and Yasumido (休戸, Fujimi) within Suwa District, and at Kanda (神田) and Hayashi (林) in Higashichikuma District (modern Matsumoto). He is also enshrined on Mount Urako in the same area. In ancient times, [Chikatō] was the tutelary deity of more than thirty villages in the district. According to oral tradition, the deity's consort was called Urakohime-no-Mikoto; there is a shrine dedicated to her in the same locality." (千鹿頭社 諏訪郡ノ内鎭座 有賀 上原 原田 横吹 休戸 東筑摩郡 神田 林 同地宇良古山ニ鎭座ス往古ハ郡内三十餘村ノ祭神ナリ 后神ヲ宇良古比賣命ト云口碑ニ傳フ由同地ニ命ノ社アリ))

The genealogy distinguishes the Moriya priestly lineage from Moriya's biological descent: his bloodline ends with Chikatō, after which the succession passes to Kodamahiko (児玉彦命), Takeminakata's grandson who became the successor to Moriya's legacy at Takeminakata's behest. (Note: "Kodamahiko-no-Mikoto: The son of Katakurabe-no-Mikoto, the son of the Great Deity. In accordance with the Great Deity's command, he became successor to the lineage of Chikatō-no-Kami and took charge of the rites and governance. He married Mitsutamahime-no-Kami, daughter of Moritatsu-no-Kami, and fathered Yakushi-no-Kami."<rf/>(兒玉彦命：大神御子片倉邊命之御子也。大神之御言之隨、千鹿頭神之跡乎繼弖主祭政。守達神御子、美都多麻比賣神乎娶弖、八櫛神乎生。))

== Analysis ==
=== Setting ===
The Nobushige Gejō states that the Suwa deity descended from heaven to the foot of Mount Moriya. Other texts likewise associate the mountain with the conflict; the Suwa Daimyōjin Kōshiki, for instance, states that Moriya fled into the mountain after being defeated.

Moreover, beside this shrine there is a mountain peak known since ancient times as 'Moriya's Peak' (洩矢嶽). It is said to be the place where the wicked enemy, after ceasing his resistance, suddenly disappeared from sight. For this reason, so as not to let the glorious deeds of former ages be forgotten, a trace of the event was preserved as an example for generations to come, and a mound was left within the shrine precincts.

In many earlier texts, the battle between Suwa Daimyōjin and Moriya is presented as the origin legend of Fujishima Shrine, an auxiliary shrine (sessha) of the Upper Suwa Shrine located about 500 metres north of the Upper Shrine's main shrine (Kamisha Honmiya). This shrine serves as the site of the sacred rice field (御作田, misakuda) where the Upper Shrine's annual rice-planting ritual (御田植祭, otaue matsuri) is performed. The rice planted there is traditionally believed to mature unusually quickly and is considered to be one of the Seven Wonders of Suwa Taisha.

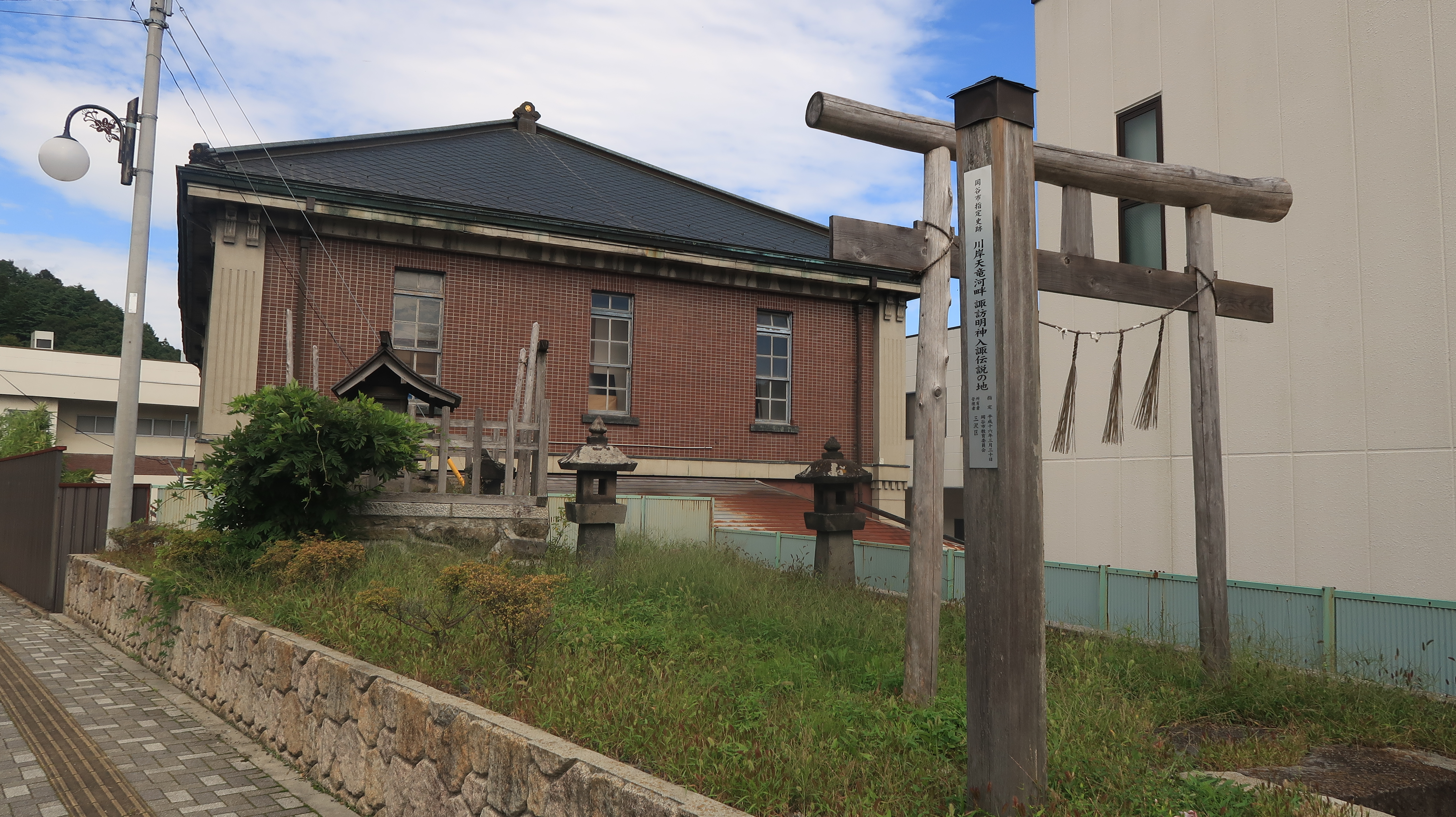
Fujishima Shrine (藤島神社) in Okaya Originally a burial mound dating from the late 6th- / early 7th-century that became associated with the Moriya myth due to its proximity to Moriya Shrine

By the Edo period, a new tradition had arisen identifying the 'Fujishima Shrine' mentioned in these texts with a shrine beside the Tenryū River in what is now Misawa, Kawagishi-Kami, Okaya City. The shrine stands on the site of a 6th- or early 7th-century burial mound called Kōjinzuka (荒神塚, “Kōjin Mound”), later associated with Sanbō Kōjin. Local legend holds that Moriya Shrine in the village of Hashibara (part of modern Kawagishi-Higashi, Okaya), where the god Moriya is enshrined, once stood on the opposite bank before it was moved to its current location. Later retellings of the myth consequently came to identify the area around the two shrines as the place where the two gods fought.

=== Historicity of the myth ===
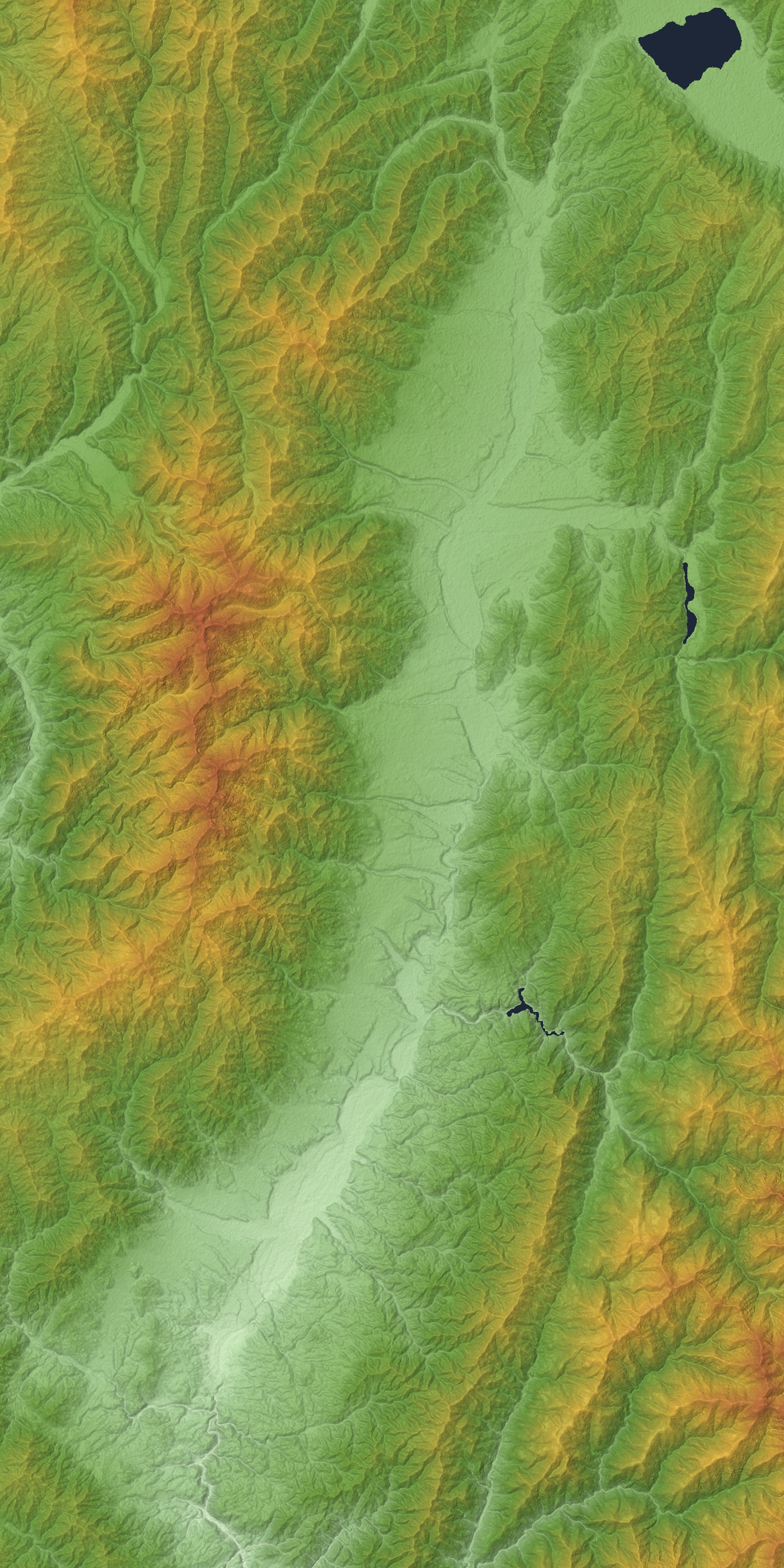
Relief map of the Ina Valley. Lake Suwa can be seen at top right.

The myth of Takeminakata’s (Suwa Myōjin’s) arrival in Suwa and his defeat of Moriya has often been interpreted as a mythologized account of a shift in political authority. In this view, the Moriya, a powerful local lineage in the Lake Suwa region, was defeated by an incoming clan, the Suwa, which then established the worship of the kami Takeminakata. The Moriya nevertheless retained an important ritual role under the new order, producing a bipartite religious system: the Suwa clan provided the Ōhōri, the living embodiment of their deity, while the Moriya retained authority over religious rites, including the Ōhōri's investiture. Their prerogative over Mishaguji-related rituals has likewise been interpreted as a survival of their earlier position as leaders of Suwa’s indigenous religious tradition. From this perspective, Mishaguji worship represented a pre-existing local cult subsequently incorporated into the religious system centered on Takeminakata and the Ōhōri.

Fune Kofun (フネ古墳), the earliest known tomb in Suwa, thought to date to the early 5th century. The ritualistic nature of some of its grave goods, such as wave-bladed ceremonial swords (蛇行剣, dakōken), and its proximity to the Kamisha Honmiya have led to speculation that the burial belonged to elite figures connected to religious traditions that later developed around Suwa Taisha.

One theory places the conflict between these two opposing groups at the end of the Jōmon period, interpreting it as a clash between incoming agrarian Yayoi groups and indigenous Jōmon hunter-gatherers. Another dates it to the late Kofun period (late 6th–early 7th century), when keyhole-shaped burial mounds containing equestrian gear began appearing in the Lake Suwa region, replacing earlier local burial practices exemplified by the early 5th-century Fune Kofun (フネ古墳), the oldest known tomb in the area located near the Kamisha Honmiya. This has been taken as evidence for the arrival of a horse-breeding group allied with the Yamato kingship, possibly migrating northward from the Shimoina region along the Tenryū River. Proponents of this hypothesis also cite the Nobushige Gejō, which describes the Suwa deity as descending from heaven with bells, a mirror, a saddle, and a bridle. This imagery has been interpreted as reflecting the arrival of people who introduced horizontal stone-chamber tombs and horse-breeding technology to the Suwa region.

The view that the myth reflects an historical event has, however, been challenged by more recent scholarship. Similarities between it and medieval legends concerning Prince Shōtoku's defeat of Mononobe no Moriya—including the name 'Moriya' itself and the dating of the event to Emperor Yōmei's reign in some texts—have led some scholars to suggest that the Suwa legend was highly influenced by or even modeled on these stories. Takayuki Aoki (2012) dates the formation of the legend to the late Heian or early Kamakura period, when the cult of the Suwa deity as a warrior god was gaining prominence, and criticizes attempts to correlate the myth directly with archaeological evidence.

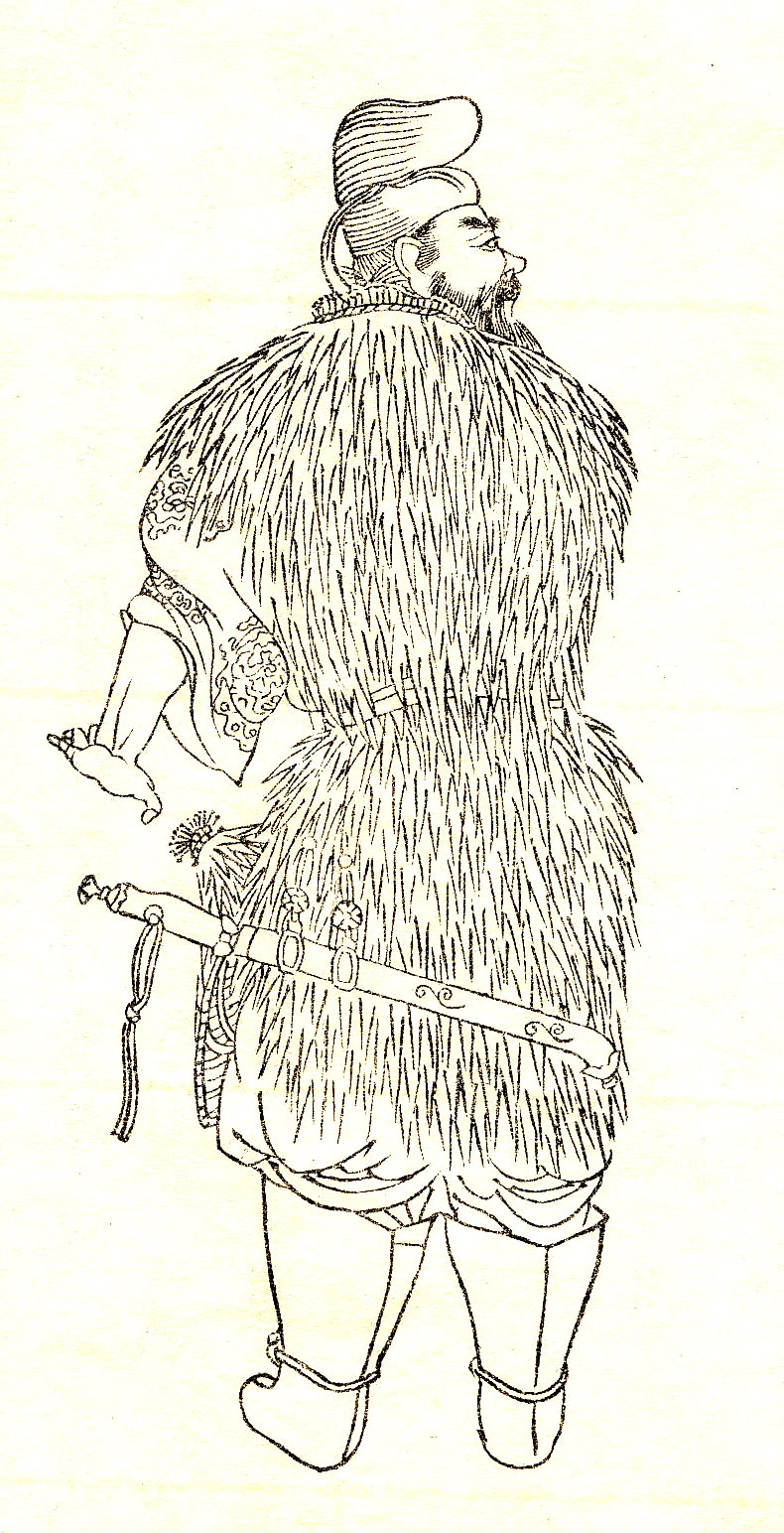
Mononobe no Moriya by Kikuchi Yōsai

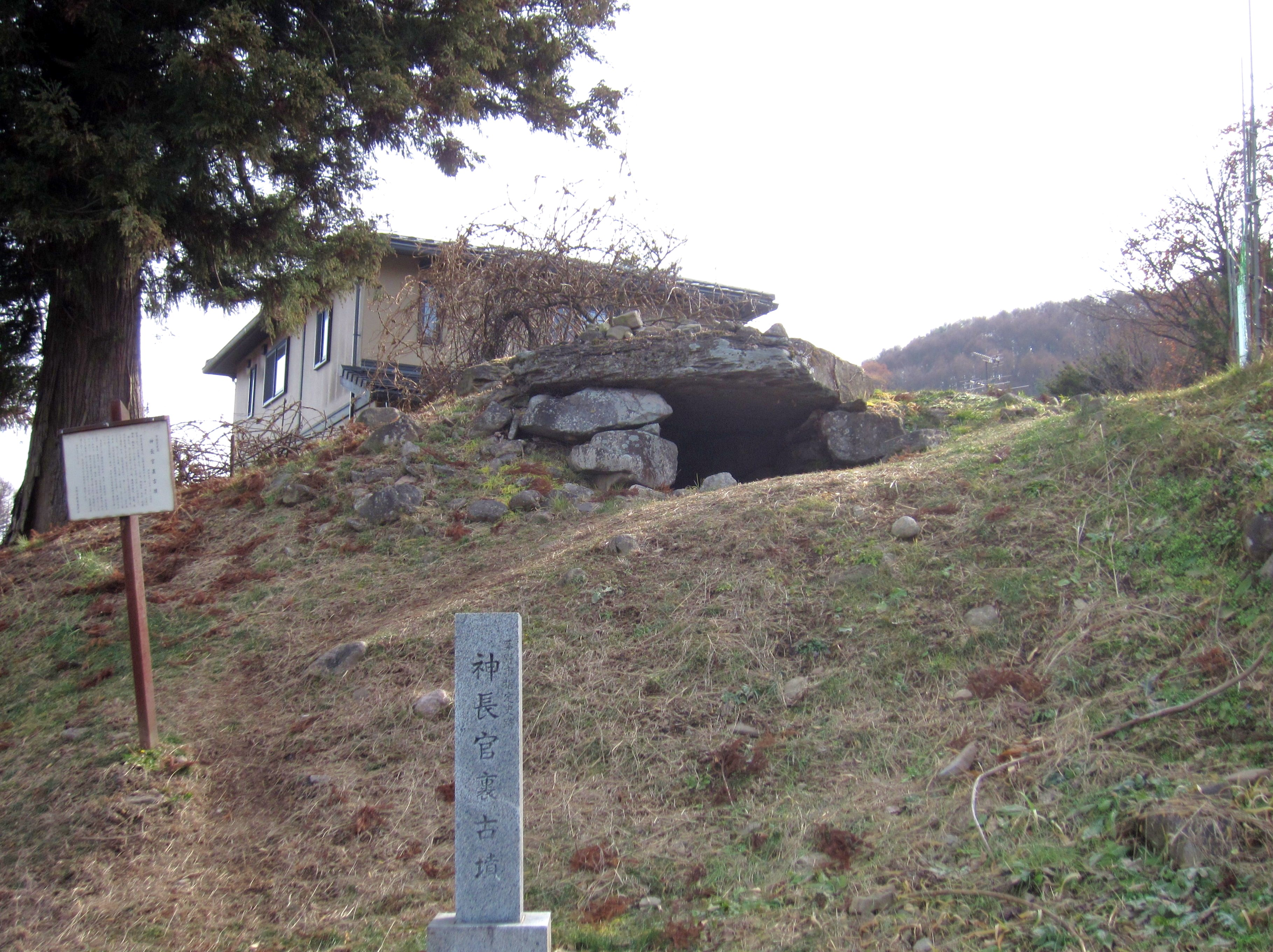
The Jinchōkan-ura Kofun (神長官裏古墳) in the Moriya estate in Chino, Nagano. The 7th century tomb is linked with Mononobe no Moriya's supposed son Takemaro in family lore.

=== Moreya, the Moriya clan and Mononobe no Moriya ===
The similarity between the names of both Moreya/Moriya and the 6th century Ōmuraji Mononobe no Moriya, who opposed the introduction of Buddhism to Japan, had led to a long-standing conflation of the two figures (cf. Moreya being called Moriya Daijin in medieval texts).

The Jinchō Moriya-shi Keifu recounts a legend that a son of Mononobe no Moriya, named either Takemaro (武麿) or Otogimi (弟君), survived the defeat of the Mononobe in the Battle of Mount Shigi in 587 and fled to Suwa, where he married into the Moriya clan. (Note: 「武麿 (一云弟君): 三十一代用命天皇御宇 物部守屋大連_{守屋大臣ハ饒速日命苗裔 尾輿大連ノ子}爲國殞身河内國澁川館兒孫逃匿葦原或逃、亡長子雄君入美濃、次子武麿入于信濃洲羽來弖娶神氏女嗣長職。」) A small mound in the Moriya clan's historical estate in Chino dated to the 7th century is claimed in family lore to be Takemaro's tomb.

Ōwa (1990) believes this story to be modelled after the biography of Mononobe no Masara (物部麻佐良), who according to the Sendai Kuji Hongi married Imoko (妹古), the daughter of an unidentified 'Suwa-no-Atai' (須羽直) during the reign of Emperor Buretsu in the late 5th century, yet sees it as at least being inspired by a real-life connection between the Mononobe clan and Shinano Province.

Moriya Shrine in Okaya City where Moreya is worshipped currently denies any connection between the god and the Mononobe chancellor.

== Shrine ==
A single shrine to Moreya, Moriya Shrine (洩矢神社 Moriya-jinja), stands in Okaya City, Nagano, near the Tenryū River. On the opposite bank stands Fujishima Shrine (藤島神社 Fujishima-jinja), where legend says Suwa Myōjin stood or encamped during the battle. The other Fujishima Shrine (藤島社 Fujishima-sha), where the wisteria Suwa Myōjin used during the battle was supposedly planted and sprouted, is in Nakasu, Suwa City.

== See also ==
- Mishaguji
- Mononobe no Moriya
- Suwa Daimyōjin Ekotoba
- Suwa taisha
- Takeminakata

== Bibliography ==
- Aoki, Takayuki (March 2012). "世的神話世界の形成 : 諏訪上社大祝と『諏訪大明神絵詞』をめぐって (Seteki shinwa sekai no keisei: Suwa Kamisha Ōhōri to Suwa Daimyōjin Ekotoba o megutte)". 長野県立歴史館研究紀要 (Bulletin of the Nagano Prefectural Museum of History) (in Japanese). 18. Nagano Prefectural Museum of History: 24–35.
- Fukuda, Akira; Nihonmatsu, Yasuhiro; Tokuda, Kazuo, eds. (2015). 諏訪信仰の中世―神話・伝承・歴史 (Suwa shinkō no chūsei: shinwa, denshō, rekishi). Miyai Shoten. ISBN 978-4838232888. (in Japanese)
- Imai, Nogiku (1960). 諏訪ものがたり (Suwa monogatari). Kōyō Shobō (甲陽書房). (in Japanese)
- Grumbach, Lisa (2005). Sacrifice and Salvation in Medieval Japan: Hunting and Meat in Religious Practice at Suwa Jinja (PhD). Stanford University.
- Hara, Masanao (2018). "守屋山の習俗と伝承 (Moriyasan no shūzoku to denshō)". In Yamamoto, Hiroko (ed.). 諏訪学 (Suwagaku). Kokusho Kankōkai. ISBN 978-4-3360-6254-3. (in Japanese)
- Harada, Minoru (2018). "守矢家文書". 偽書が描いた日本の超古代史 (Gisho ga egaita Nihon no chō-kodaishi) (in Japanese). Kawade Shobō Shinsha. ISBN 978-4309485027.
- Ihara, Kesao (2008-03-31). "鎌倉期の諏訪神社関係史料にみる神道と仏道 : 中世御記文の時代的特質について (Shinto and Buddhism as Depicted in Historical Materials Related to Suwa Shrines of the Kamakura Period : Temporal Characteristics of Medieval Imperial Writings)". Bulletin of the National Museum of Japanese History. 139: 157–185. (in Japanese)
- Inoue, Takami (2003). "The Interaction between Buddhist and Shinto Traditions at Suwa Shrine". In Rambellli, Fabio; Teuuwen, Mark (eds.). Buddhas and Kami in Japan: Honji Suijaku as a Combinatory Paradigm. Routledge. ISBN 978-1134431236.
- Kanai, Tenbi (1982). 諏訪信仰史 (Suwa shinkō shi). Meicho Shuppan. ISBN 978-4626001245. (in Japanese)
- Kodai Buzoku Kenkyūkai, ed. (2017b). 古代諏訪の祭祀と氏族 (Kodai Suwa no saishi to shizoku). Ningen-sha (人間社). ISBN 978-4908627163. (in Japanese)
- Kodai Buzoku Kenkyūkai, ed. (2018). 諏訪信仰の発生と展開 (Suwa shinkō no hassei to tenkai). 日本原初考 (Nihon gensho-kō). Vol. 3. Ningensha. ISBN 978-4908627170. (in Japanese)
- Maeda, Ryōtarō (2019-08-08). "『諏方大明神画詞』諏方社祭絵第四、六月晦日条考 : 「藤嶋ノ明神」をめぐるテクストの諸相 ("Suwa Daimyōjin Ekotoba," Suwa-sha-sai e daiyon, rokugatsu misoka jō kō: 'Fujishima no Myōjin' o meguru tekusuto no shosō)". 国語国文研究 (Kokugo Kokubun Kenkyū). 153. Hokkaido University Japanese Language and Literature Society: 33–45. hdl:2115/76709. (in Japanese)
- Maeda, Ryōtarō (May 2021). "The Reception and Development of the Biography of Prince Shotoku in the Legend of Suwa Myojin: With a Focus on the "Suwa Daimyojin Koshiki" (諏訪明神縁起における聖徳太子伝の受容と展開)". Kokugakuin Zasshi (The Journal of Kokugakuin University) (in Japanese). 122 (5): 59–75.
- Maeda, Ryōtarō (2023-03-20). "『諏方大明神画詞』の受容史：国譲り神話の扱いを中心に ("Suwa Daimyojin Ekotoba" no juyōshi: kuni-yuzuri shinwa no atsukai o chūshin ni)". 国語国文研究 (Kokugo Kokubun Kenkyū) (in Japanese). 160. Hokkaido University: 16–30. hdl:2115/91668.
- Miyasaka, Mitsuaki (1987). "強大なる神の国―諏訪信仰の特質 (Kyōdai naru kami no kuni: Suwa-shinkō no tokushitsu)". 御柱祭と諏訪大社 (Onbashira-sai to Suwa-taisha). By Ueda, Masaaki; Gorai, Shigeru; Miyasaka, Yūshō; Ōbayashi, Taryō; Miyasaka, Mitsuaki. Nagano: Chikuma Shobō. ISBN 978-4-480-84181-0. (in Japanese)
- Miyasaka, Mitsuaki (1992). 諏訪大社の御柱と年中行事 (Suwa-taisha no onbashira to nenchu-gyōji). Kyōdo shuppansha. ISBN 978-4-87663-178-0. (in Japanese)
- Miyaji, Naokazu (1931). 諏訪史 第二卷 前編 (Suwa shi, vol. 2, part 1). Shinano kyōikukai Suwa-bukai. (in Japanese)
- Miyaji, Naokazu (1937). 諏訪史 第二卷 後編 (Suwa shi, vol. 2, part 2). Shinano kyōikukai Suwa-bukai. (in Japanese)
- Moriya, Sanae (1991). "守矢神長家のお話し (Moriya Jinchō-ke no ohanashi)". In Jinchōkan Moriya Historical Museum (ed.). 神長官守矢資料館のしおり (Jinchōkan Moriya Shiryōkan no shiori) (Rev. ed.). (in Japanese)
- Nihonmatsu, Yasuhiro, ed. (2019). 諏訪信仰の歴史と伝承 (Suwa shinkō no rekishi to denshō). Miyai Shoten. ISBN 978-4-8382-3344-1. (in Japanese)
- Ogura, Kōji (1941). 神道叢話 (Shinto Sōwa). Kinseisha. (in Japanese)
- Oh, Amana ChungHae (2011). Cosmogonical Worldview of Jomon Pottery. Sankeisha. ISBN 978-4-88361-924-5.
- Ōta, Akira (1926). 諏訪神社誌 第1巻 (Suwa-jinja shi: Volume 01) (in Japanese).
- Ōwa, Iwao (1990). 信濃古代史考 (Shinano kodaishi kō). Tokyo: Meicho Shuppan. ISBN 978-4626013637. (in Japanese)
- Shintō Taikei Hensankai, ed. (1982). "諏方大明神講式 (Suwa Daimyōjin Kōshiki)". 神道大系 神社編30 諏訪 (Shintō Taikei Jinja-hen, 30: Suwa). Tokyo: Shintō Taikei Hensankai. (in Japanese)
- Suwa Kyōikukai, ed. (1938). 諏訪史年表 (Suwa shinenpyō). Nagano: Suwa Kyōikukai. (in Japanese)
- Suwa Shishi Hensan Iinkai, ed. (1995). 諏訪市史 上巻 原始・古代・中世 (Suwa-shi shi, vol. 1: genshi, kodai, chūsei). Suwa. (in Japanese)
- Takabe Rekishi Hensan Iinkai, ed. (2006). 続・高部の文化財 (Zoku: Takabe no bunkazai). Miyagawa, Chino, Nagano. (in Japanese)
- Terada, Shizuko; Washio, Tetsuta (2010). 諏訪明神 カミ信仰の原像 (Suwa Myōjin: Kami shinkō no genzō). Iwata Shoten. ISBN 978-4-87294-608-6. (in Japanese)
- Yamada, Hajime (1929). 諏訪大明神 (Suwa Daimyōjin). 信濃郷土叢書 (Shinano Kyōdo Sōsho). Vol. 1. Shinano Kyōdo Bunka Fukyūkai. (in Japanese)
- Yazaki, Takenori (Mōhaku), ed. (1986). 諏訪大社 (Suwa-taisha). Ginga gurafikku sensho. Vol. 4. Ginga shobō. (in Japanese)
