= Shimosuwa Aozuka Kofun =

Kofun period burial mound in Shimosuwa, Nagano, Japan

- 下諏訪青塚古墳 (Japanese)
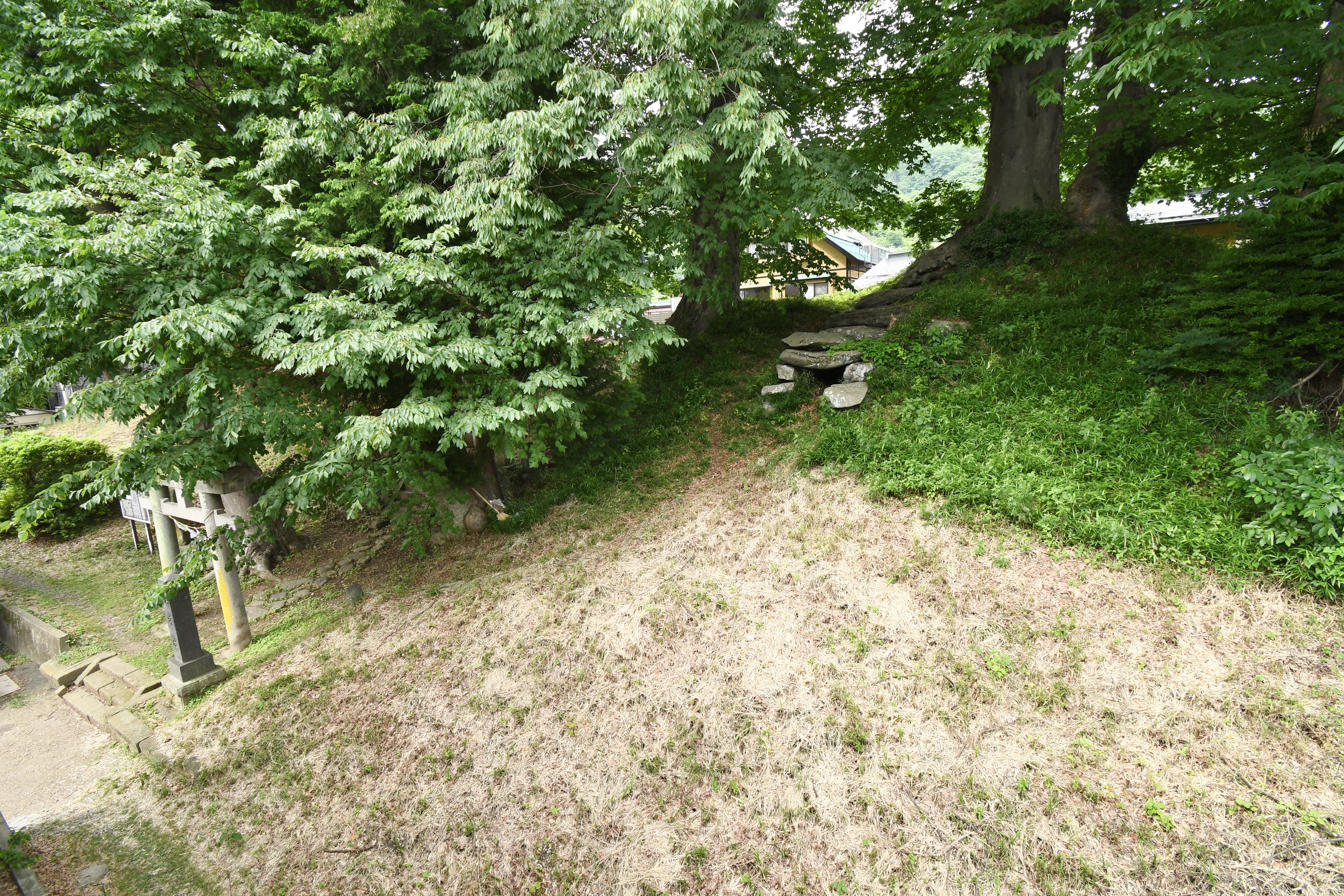
- Shimosuwa Aozuka Kofun

- Shimosuwa Aozuka Kofun Shimosuwa Aozuka Kofun (Japan)
- 36°4′34.97″N 138°5′20.68″E
- Type: Kofun
- Periods: Kofun period
- Location: Yokomachi, Suwa District, Shimosuwa, Nagano, Japan
- Region: Chūbu region

History
- Built: late 6th century

Site notes
- Public access: Yes (no facilities)
- Nagano Prefecture Historic Site

Shimosuwa Aozuka Kofun (下諏訪青塚古墳) is a Kofun period keyhole-shaped burial mound, located in the Yokomachi neighborhood of the town of Shimosuwa, Nagano Prefecture in the Chūbu region of Japan. The tumulus was designated a Nagano Prefecture Historic Site in 1965.

== Overview ==
The Shimosuwa Aozuka Kofun is a zenpō-kōen-fun (前方後円墳), which is shaped like a keyhole, having one square end and one circular end, when viewed from above. It is located on the tip of a hill jutting out to the west in the Shimosuwa region north of Lake Suwa. It is located near the Shimosuwa post town on the early modern Nakasendō road and the Shimosha Akimiya shrine of Suwa Grand Shrine. The area around the mound (especially the eastern side) has been leveled by development. Currently surrounded by houses, only the north side is open by a road, but it is in a narrow area. The mound itself is protected by large zelkova trees.The Aozuka-sha, an outlying shrine of Suwa Grand Shrine, is built on the western side of the constricted section.

The tumulus is orientated to the north-northwest. Cylindrical haniwa clay figures can be seen on the outer surface of the mound. According to Edo period records, a 120-cm warrior-figure haniwa was unearthed and subsequently reburied, but recent investigations have found nothing but cylindrical haniwa. The existence of a surrounding moat is unclear. The burial facility is a double-chambered horizontal-entry stone burial chamber in the posterior circular section orientated perpendicular to the mound, and opening to the west. The chamber measures approximately 5.5 meters in length and 2.15 meters in width at the back wall. The floor of the burial chamber is located approximately five meters higher than the base of the burial mound. Natural andesite stones were used for construction, and the chamber was built using a random stone masonry technique. The upper part of the side walls is corbelled. The ceiling stones are flat pyroxene andesite stones, which are exposed as the mound's earth has eroded away. It was already open during the Edo period and had been looted in antiquity so no grave goods are known, other than a Sue ware cup and a few small beads.

The tumulus is approximately a ten minute walk from the JR East Chūō Main Line Shimo-Suwa Station Haniwa fragments from the tumulus are on display at the Hoshigato Museum, Yanoneya. . From the construction method and haniwa, the tumulus is estimated to have been constructed during the latter half of the 6th century, in the late Kofun period. It is the only keyhole-shaped burial mound in the Suwa region and is thought to have a connection to the Kanasashi clan, the hereditary kannushi of the Lower Shrine of Suwa Grand Shrine.

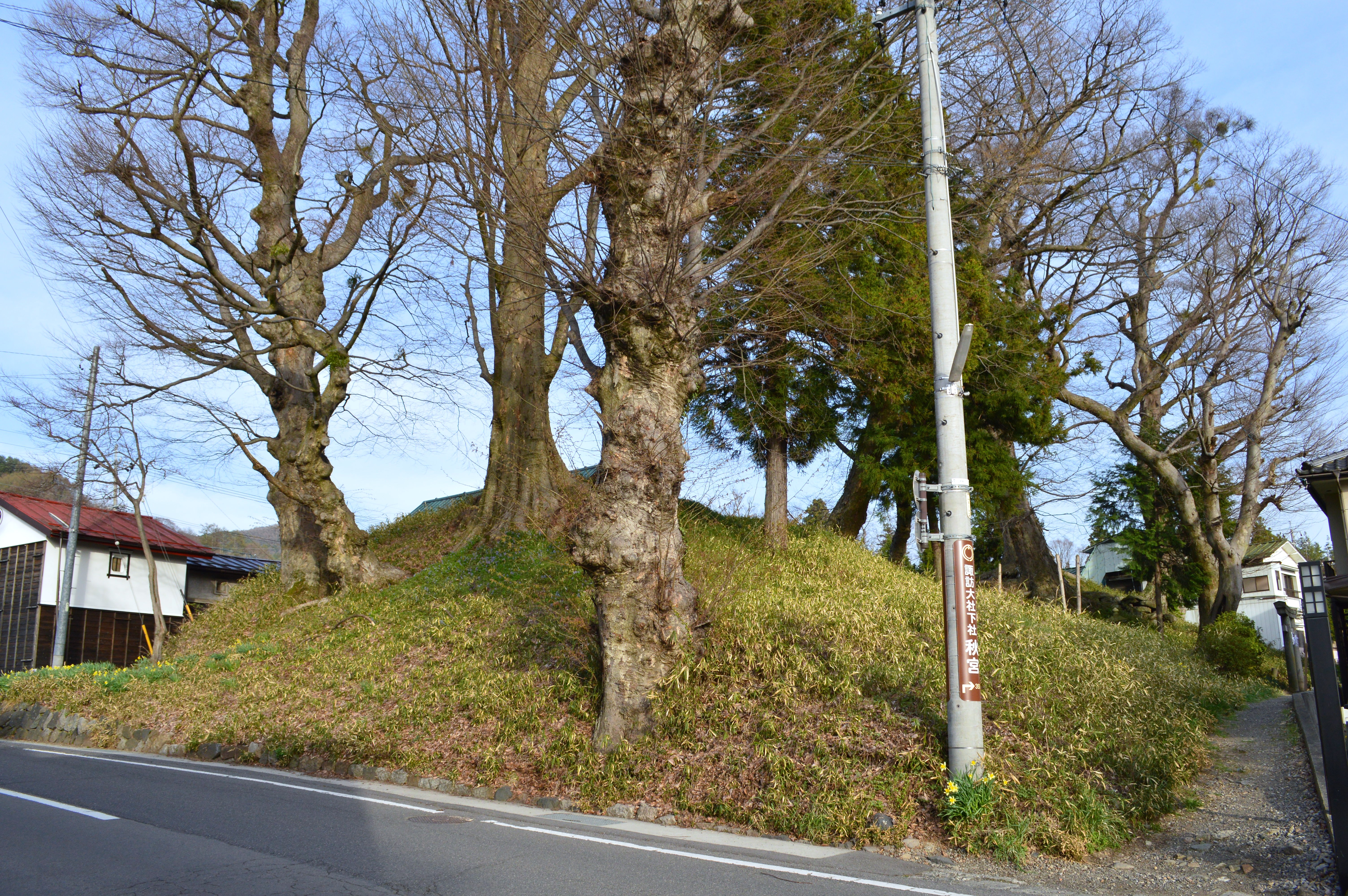
Overview

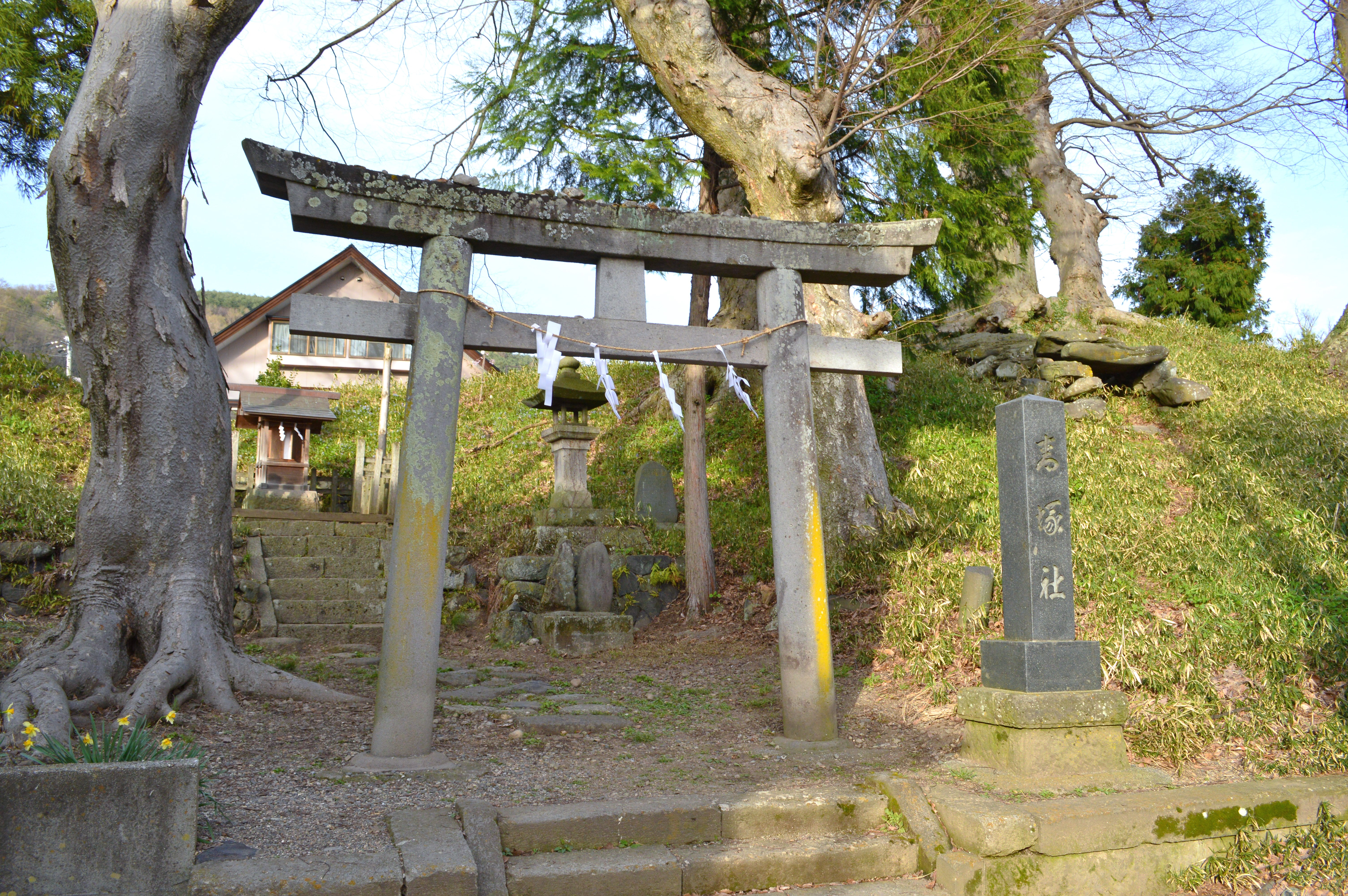
Aozuka-sha

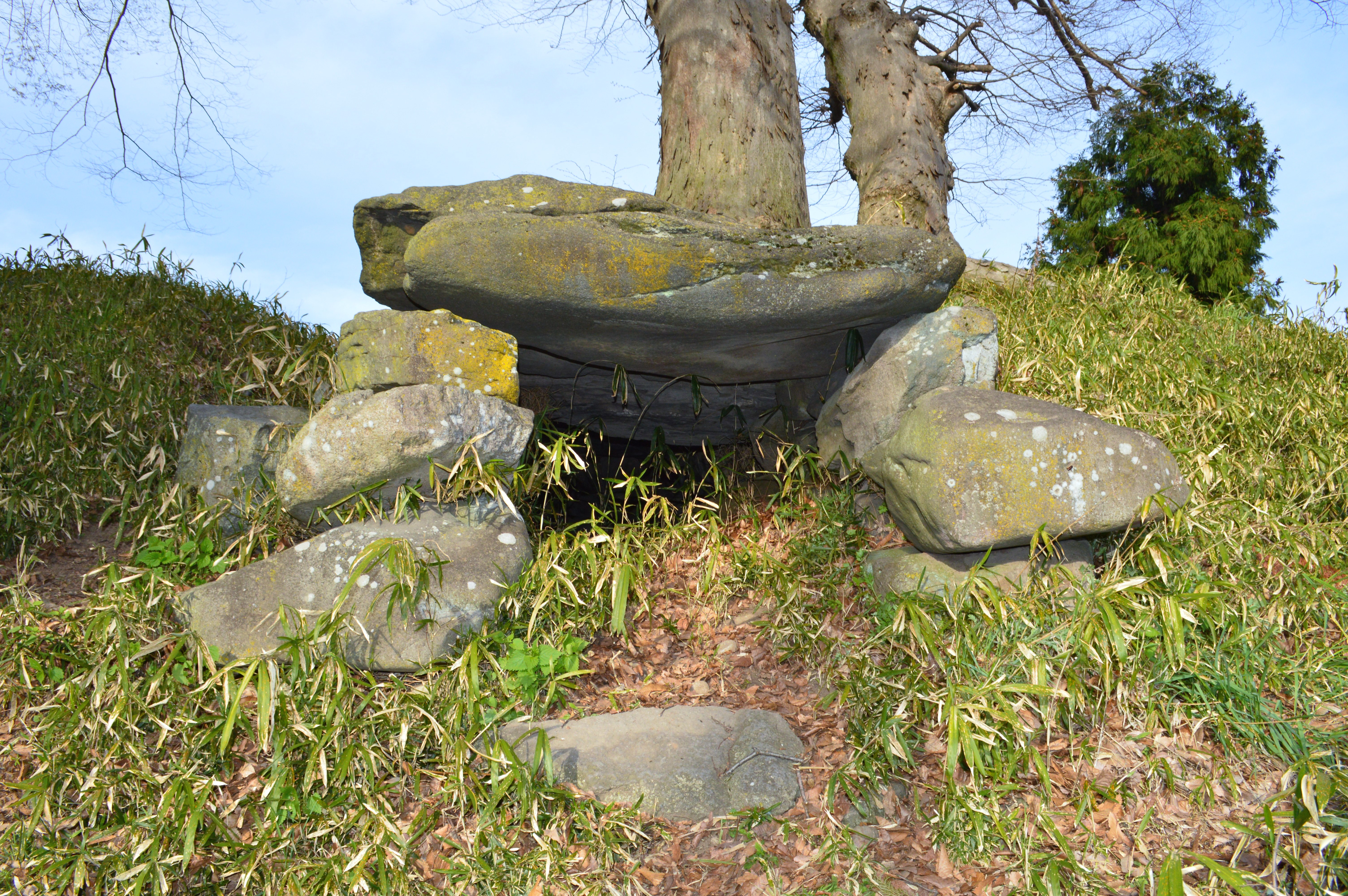
Exposed burial chamber

Total length
67 meter (estimated original length; current 59 meters)
Anterior rectangular portion
43 meters wide, 6 meters high
Posterior circular portion
33 meter diameter (estimated original length; current 24 meters), 7.7 meters high

== See also ==
- List of Historic Sites of Japan (Nagano)
