= A View of Mount Fuji Across Lake Suwa =

Japanese woodblock print by Hokusai

- 信州諏訪湖 (Japanese), Shinsu Suwako (Japanese)
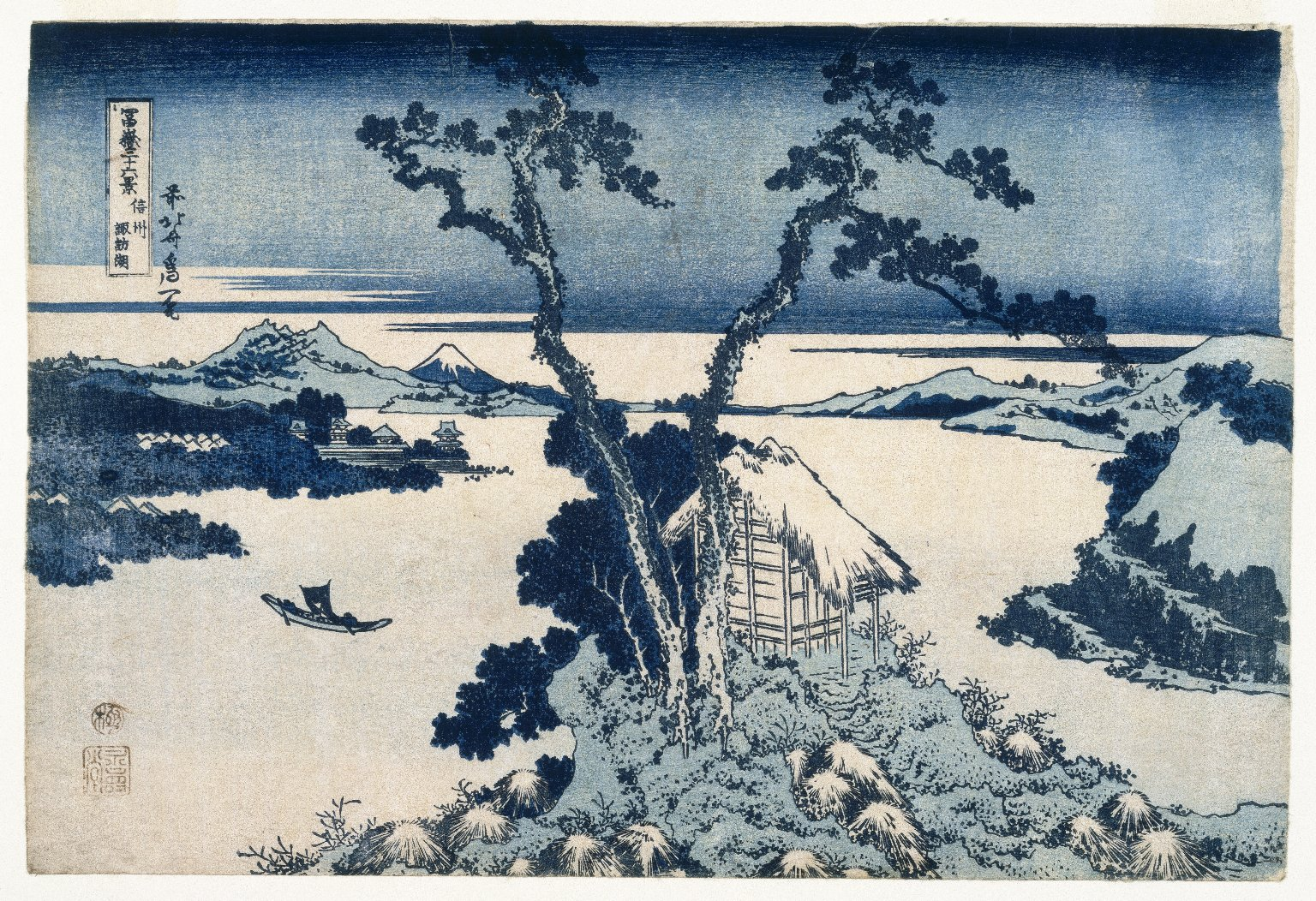
- Artist: Katsushika Hokusai
- Year: c. 1830–1832
- Type: Ukiyo-e woodblock print
- Dimensions: 25.72 cm × 38 cm (10.125 in × 15 in)

A View of Mount Fuji Across Lake Suwa (Shinsu Suwako) is a woodblock print by the Japanese ukiyo-e artist Hokusai.

It was produced as one of the Thirty-six Views of Mount Fuji series which was published from c. 1830 to 1832 in the late Edo period.

The image depicts Lake Suwa from above with Mount Fuji barely visible in the distance. Centered in the foreground atop a hill is a hut, possibly a shrine, overshadowed by two large trees. To the left a boat heads towards a village nestled in dense vegetation, possibly Shiwo Suwa. Presently well inland, Takashima Castle is depicted on a promontory just below Fuji.

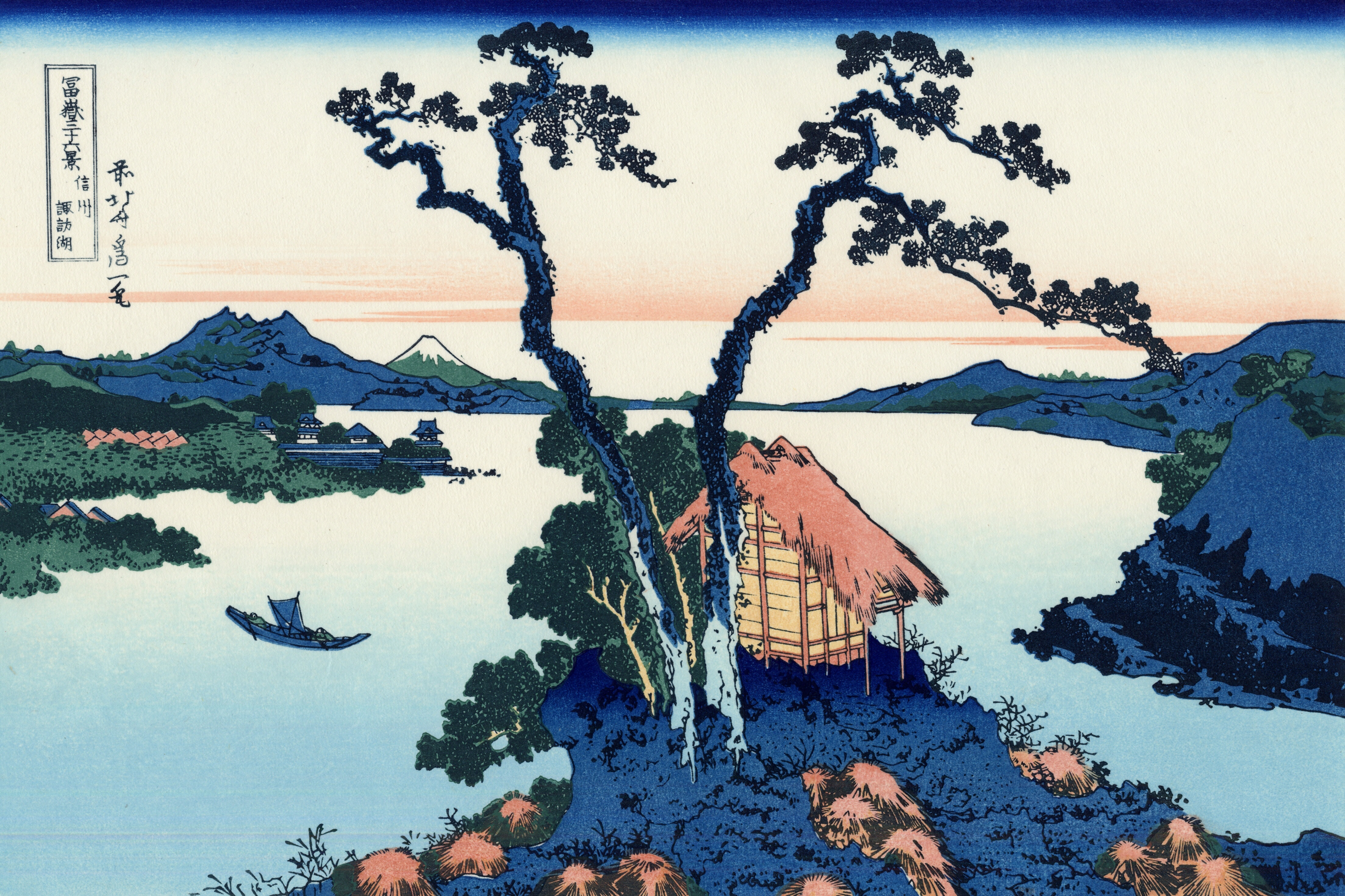
Later impression with more colours, c. 1930

The original print is rendered in blue tones (aizuri-e) so the scene appears to be set just before dawn. All later impressions introduce various colours. The blue sky on the horizon is replaced with an orange tone which shifts the time forward to the morning or early evening. Fuji and many of the trees are rendered in shades of green. The timber of the hut and some branches are picked out in yellow tones.
