= Thirty-six Views of Mount Fuji (Hiroshige) =

Series of 19th-century woodblock prints by Hiroshige

View of Mount Fuji from Satta Point in the Suruga Bay
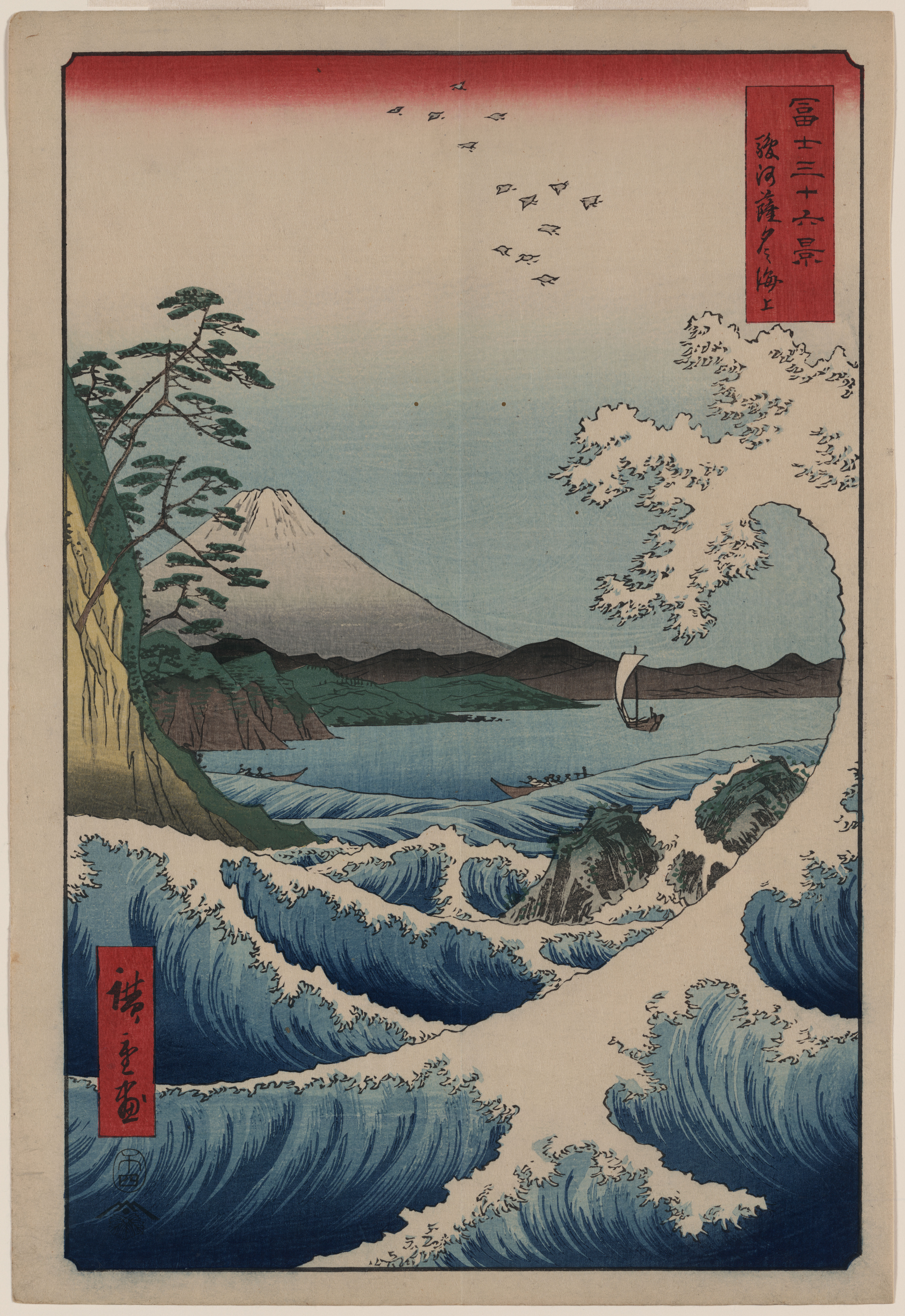
- Artist: Hiroshige
- Year: 1858
- Type: coloured woodcut

Thirty-six Views of Mount Fuji (Japanese: 富士三十六景, Hepburn: Fuji Sanjū-Rokkei) is the title of two series of woodblock prints by Japanese ukiyo-e artist Hiroshige, depicting Mount Fuji in differing seasons and weather conditions from a variety of different places and distances. The 1852 series, published by Sanoya Kihei, are in landscape orientation using the chūban format, while the 1858 series are in the portrait ōban format and were published by Tsutaya Kichizō. The same subject had previously been dealt with by Hokusai in two of his own series, Thirty-six Views of Mount Fuji, produced from c. 1830 to 1832, and One Hundred Views of Mount Fuji, published in three volumes from 1834 to 1849.

== Prints ==
Note: All locations use the modern place names.

=== 1852 series ===
This series was published by Sanoya Kihei. The images are shown in the order as determined by the Yamanashi Prefectural Museum. There is an alternate numbering scheme that corresponds to that given by Edmond de Goncourt in his work on Hokusai.

№	Image	Japanese title	Translated title	Location	Notes
2		東都目黒千代が崎; Tōto meguro chiyogasaki	Chiyo Promontory at Meguro in the Eastern Capital	東京都目黒区; Meguro, Tokyo	
4		相模七里か濱風波; Sagami shichirigahama fūha	Rough Sea at Shichirigahama ("Seven Ri Beach") in Sagami Province	神奈川県鎌倉市; Kamakura, Kanagawa	
11		大江戸市中七夕祭; Ōedo shichū tanabata matsuri	Tanabata Festival in Edo	東京都千代田区; Chiyoda, Tokyo	
15		東都両国橋下; Tōto ryōgokubashi shita	Below Ryōgoku Bridge in the Eastern Capital	東京都墨田区・台東区; Sumida/Taitō, Tokyo	
16		東都青山; Tōto aoyama	Aoyama in the Eastern Capital	東京都港区・渋谷区; Minato/Shibuya, Tokyo	
17		武蔵多満川; Musashi tamagawa	Tama River in Musashi Province	東京都日野市; Hino, Tokyo	
18		相模川; Sagamigawa	Sagami River	神奈川県海老名市・厚木市; Ebina/Atsugi, Kanagawa	
24		東都木下川田甫; Tōto Kinegawa tanbo	Field in Kinegawa	東京都葛飾区・墨田区; Katsushika/Sumida, Tokyo	
26		東海道大森縄手; Tōkaidō Ōmori Nawate	Path through Rice Fields at Ōmori (or Ōiso) on the Tōkaidō Road	東京都大田区大森; Ōmori, Ōta, Tokyo	
29		相模大山来迎谷; Sagami ōyama raigōdani	Valley of Approach at Ōyama in Sagami Province	神奈川県伊勢原市; Isehara, Kanagawa	
32		甲斐犬目峠; Kai inume tōge	Inume ("Dog Eye") Pass in Kai Province	山梨県上野原市; Uenohara, Yamanashi	
33		甲斐夢山裏富士; Kai yumeyama urafuji	Back View of Fuji from Dream Mountain in Kai Province	山梨県甲府市; Kōfu, Yamanashi	

=== 1858 series ===
This series was published by Tsutaya Kichizō.

№	Image	Japanese title	Translated title	Location	Notes
0		表紙目録	Table of contents		
1		東都一石ばし; Tōto ichikokubashi	Ichikoku Bridge in the Eastern Capital	東京都中央区八重洲・中央区日本橋本石町; Yaesu/Hongoku, Nihonbashi, Chūō, Tokyo	
2		東都駿河町; Tōto Surugachō	The Suruga District in the Eastern Capital	東京都千代田区駿河台; Surugadai, Chiyoda, Tokyo	
3		東都数奇屋河岸; Tōto sukiyagashi	Sukiyagashi in the Eastern Capital	東京都中央区; Chūō, Tokyo	
4		東都佃沖; Tōto tsukuda oki	Off Tsukuda Island in the Eastern Capital	東京都中央区佃; Tsukuda, Chūō, Tokyo	
5		東都御茶の水; Tōto ochanomizu	Ochanomizu in the Eastern Capital	東京都千代田区駿河台・文京区湯島; Surugadai, Chiyoda/Yushima, Bunkyō, Tokyo	
6		東都両ごく; Tōto ryōgoku	Ryōgoku in the Eastern Capital	東京都墨田区両国; Ryōgoku, Sumida, Tokyo	
7		東都墨田堤; Tōto sumida tsutsumi	The Sumida Embankment in the Eastern Capital	東京都墨田区向島; Mukōjima, Sumida, Tokyo	
8		東都あすか山; Tōto asukayama	Mt. Asuka in the Eastern Capital	東京都北区王子; Ōji, Kita, Tokyo	
9		雑司かや不二見茶や; Zōshigaya fujimi chaya	The Teahouse with the View of Mt. Fuji at Zōshigaya	東京都豊島区雑司が谷; Zōshigaya, Toshima, Tokyo	
10		東都目黒夕日か岡; Tōto Meguro Yūhi-ga-oka	Twilight Hill at Meguro in the Eastern Capital	東京都目黒区目黒; Meguro, Tokyo	
11		鴻之臺戸根川; Kōnodai tonegawa	Wild Goose Hill and the Tone River	千葉県市川市国府台; Kōnodai, Ichikawa, Chiba	
12		武蔵小金井; Musashi koganei	Koganei in Musashi Province	東京都小金井市; Koganei, Tokyo	
13		武蔵玉川; Musashi tamagawa	The Tama River in Musashi Province	東京都日野市; Hino, Tokyo	
14		武蔵越が谷在; Musashi koshigaya zai	Koshigaya in Musashi Province	埼玉県越谷市; Koshigaya, Saitama	
15		武蔵野毛横濱; Musashi noge yokohama	Noge and Yokohama in Musashi Province	神奈川県横浜市; Yokohama, Kanagawa	
16		武蔵本牧のはな; Musashi honmoku no hana	Cherry Blossoms at Honmoku in Musashi Province	神奈川県横浜市中区本牧; Honmoku, Naka-ku, Yokohama	
17		相州三浦之海上; Sōshū miura no kaijō	The Sea off the Miura Peninsula in Sagami Province	神奈川県三浦市; Miura-shi, Kanagawa-ken	
18		さがみ川; Sagamigawa	The Sagami River	神奈川県海老名市・厚木市; Ebina/Atsugi, Kanagawa	
19		相摸七里か濱; Sagami shichirigahama	The Seven Ri Beach in Sagami Province	神奈川県鎌倉市; Kamakura, Kanagawa	
20		相摸江之島入口; Sagami enoshima iriguchi	The Entrance gate at Enoshima in Sagami Province	神奈川県藤沢市; Fujisawa, Kanagawa	
21		はこ根の湖すい; Hakone no kosui	Lake at Hakone	神奈川県箱根町; Hakone, Kanagawa	
22		伊豆の山中; Izu no sanchū	The Izu Mountains	静岡県伊豆市; Izu, Shizuoka	Jōren Falls
23		駿河薩タ之海上; Suruga satta no kaijō	The Sea off Satta in Suruga Province	静岡県静岡市清水区; Shimizu-ku, Shizuoka	
24		駿河三保之松原; Suruga miho no matsubara	The Pine Forest of Miho in Suruga Province	静岡県静岡市清水区; Shimizu-ku, Shizuoka	Miho no Matsubara
25		東海堂左り不二; Tōkaidō hidari fuji	Fuji on the left of the Tōkaidō Road	静岡県富士市依田橋; Yodabashi, Fuji, Shizuoka	
26		駿遠大井川; Sun'en ōigawa	The Ōi River between Suruga and Totomi Provinces	静岡県島田市; Shimada, Shizuoka	
27		伊勢二見か浦; Ise futamigaura	Futami Bay in Ise Province	三重県伊勢市; Ise, Mie	
28		信州諏訪之湖; Shinshū suwa no mizuumi	Lake Suwa in Shinano Province	長野県諏訪市; Suwa, Nagano	
29		信濃塩尻峠; Shinano shiojiritōge	Shiojiri Pass in Shinano Province	長野県岡谷市・塩尻市; Okaya/Shiojiri, Nagano	
30		甲斐御坂越; Kai misikagoshi	Misaka Pass in Kai Province	山梨県富士河口湖町; Fujikawaguchiko, Yamanashi	
31		甲斐大月の原; Kai ōtsukinohara	The Ōtsuki Plain in Kai Province	山梨県大月市; Ōtsuki, Yamanashi	
32		甲斐犬目峠; Kai inumetōge	Dog Eye Pass in Kai Province	山梨県上野原市; Uenohara, Yamanashi	
33		下総小金原; Shimōsa koganehara	Kogane Plain in Shimōsa Province	千葉県松戸市; Matsudo, Chiba	
34		上総黒戸の浦; Kazusa kuroto no ura	Kuroto Bay in Kazusa Province	千葉県木更津市; Kisarazu, Chiba	
35		上総鹿埜山; Kazusa kanōzan	Mt. Kanō in Kazusa Province	千葉県君津市; Kimitsu, Chiba	
36		房州保田ノ海岸; Bōshū hota no kaigan	The Hota Coast in Awa Province	千葉県鋸南町; Kyonan, Chiba	

== See also ==
- Thirty-six Views of Mount Fuji by Hokusai
