= Thunderstorm Beneath the Summit =

Japanese woodblock print by Hokusai

- 山下白雨 (Japanese), Sanka Hakuu (Japanese)
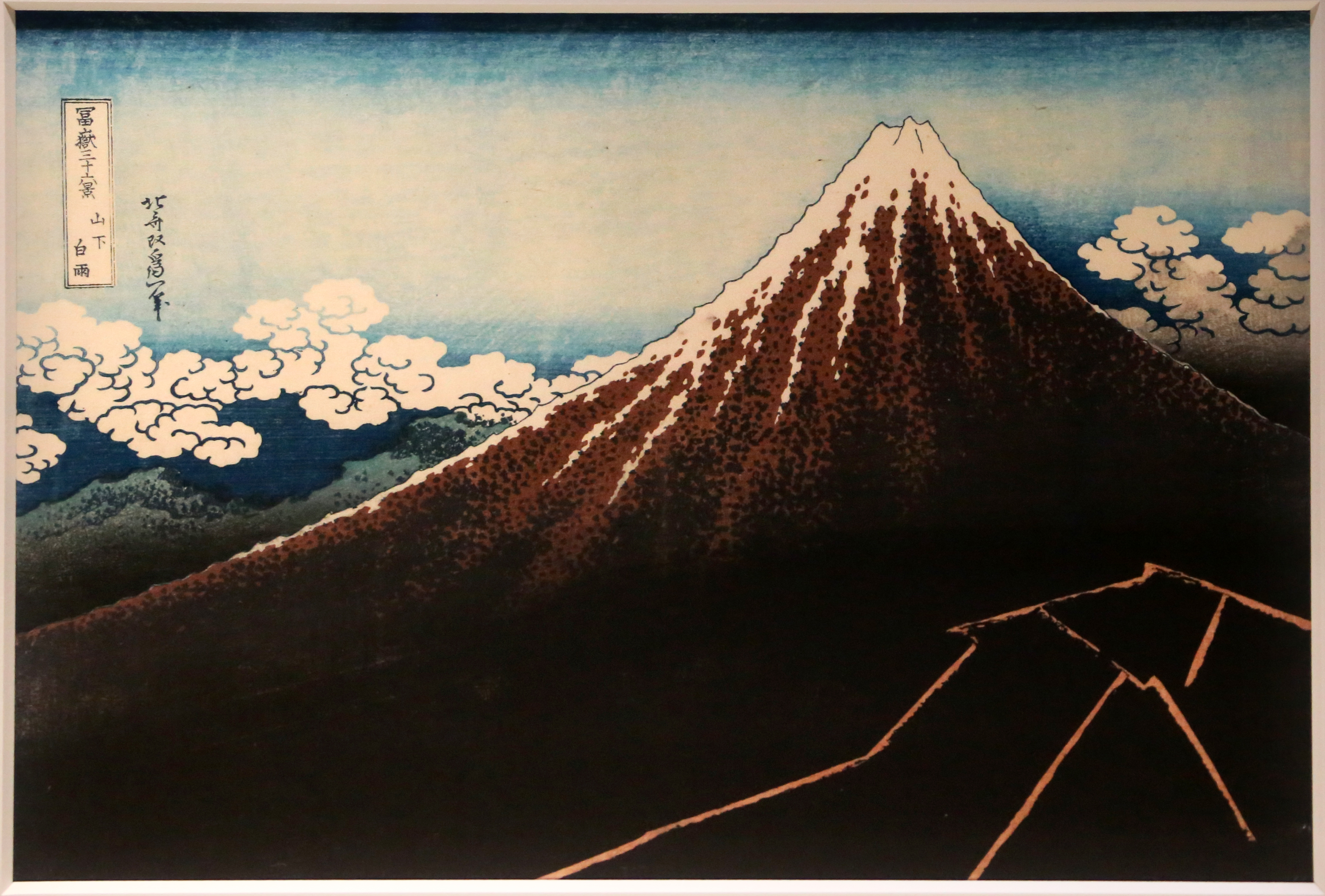
- Artist: Katsushika Hokusai
- Year: c. 1830–1832
- Type: Ukiyo-e woodblock print
- Dimensions: 25.72 cm × 38 cm (10.125 in × 15 in)

Thunderstorm Beneath the Summit (Japanese: 山下白雨, Hepburn: Sanka hakuu), also known as Rainstorm Beneath the Summit, or sometimes Black Fuji (黒富士 Kurofuji) is a woodcut print by the Japanese ukiyo-e master Hokusai (1760–1849). It is one of the most famous prints from his celebrated Thirty-six Views of Mount Fuji series, published c. 1830–1832.

== Description ==
The composition is very similar to that of Fine Wind, Clear Morning (or Red Fuji) from the same series, but the atmosphere is markedly different. Here, instead of a hazy and serene view, Mount Fuji is rendered ominously in strong heavy tones. The contours of the mountainside are more textured and defined. The snowy cap rises sharply over a darkly menacing base which has been split by a bolt of lightning rendered with powerful, almost abstract, zigzag lines. As with Fine Wind, Clear Morning, a thin line of Prussian blue is used in the upper portion of the sky, but here the clouds have a smoke-like quality and appear to cling to the mountain. The three peaks at the summit suggest that this view is of the back of Fuji (i.e. seen from the West), another contrast with the Red Fuji print.

== Impressions ==
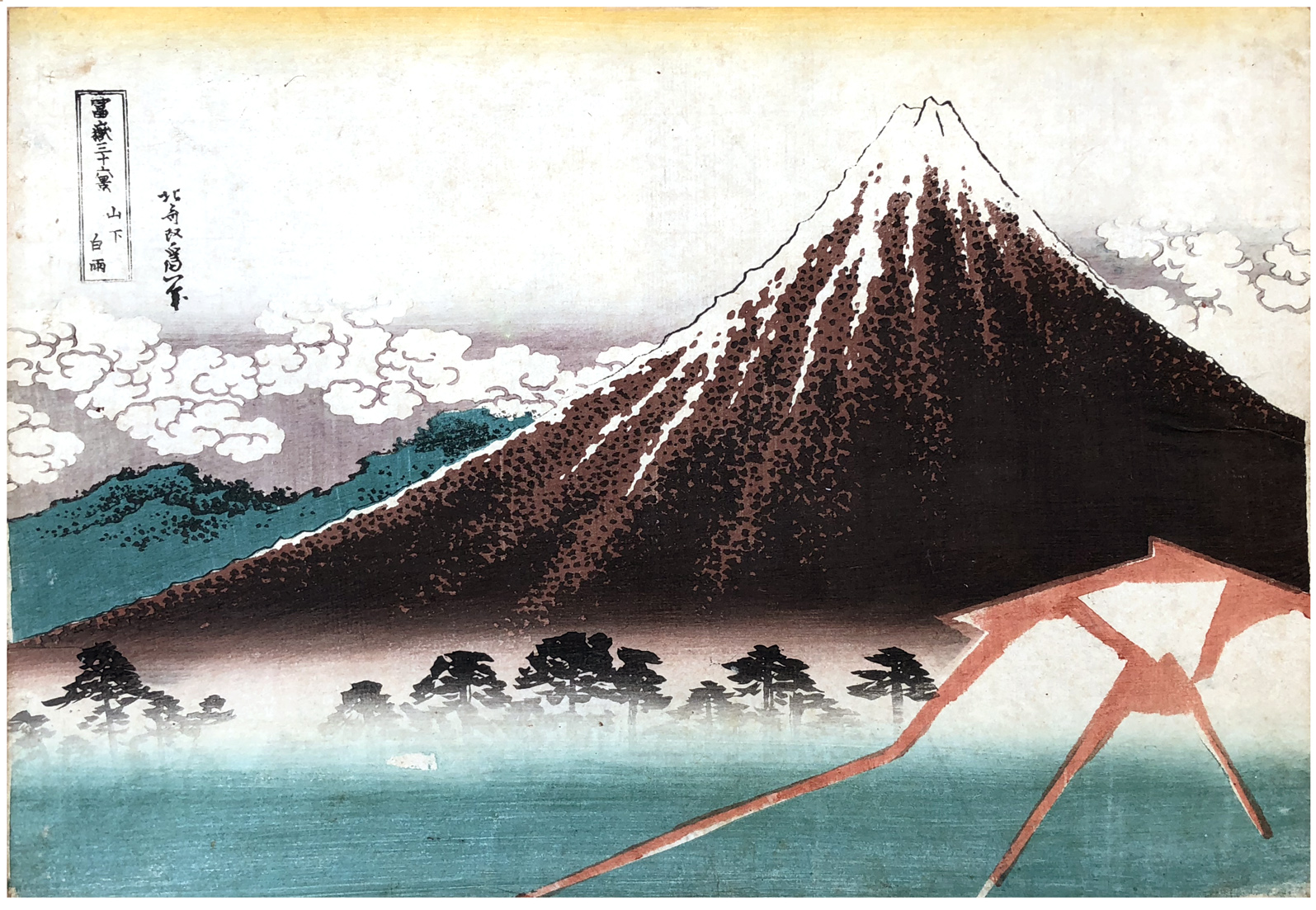
Thunderstorm Beneath the Summit later variation

Soon after publication the blocks were slightly damaged with the loss of one of the brown dots below the summit and the end of the 'hitsu' ('brush of') character from Hokusai's signature. Impressions made before this have "continuous blue down the sky, wiped lighter across the middle, so making clear the entire shapes of the cumulonimbus clouds - rather than leaving a wide band of un-inked sky across the centre and thereby losing their tops."

In a later impression the publisher introduced some significant changes. The sky is now rendered in purplish greyish with a band of yellow at the top. The flash of the lightning bolt vividly silhouettes a group of pine trees at the foot of the mountain, cut from a new block, making them appear close to the viewer.
