= Hoshigatō obsidian mine site =

Jōmon period archaeological site in Japan

- 星ヶ塔黒曜石原産地遺跡 (Japanese)
- Hoshigatō obsidian mine site Hoshigatō obsidian mine site (Japan)
- 36°06′12″N 138°06′36″E
- Periods: Jōmon period
- Location: Shimosuwa, Nagano, Japan
- Region: Chūbu region

Site notes
- Elevation: 1,500 m (4,900 ft)
- Public access: none

The Hoshigatō obsidian mine site (星ヶ塔黒曜石原産地遺跡, Hoshigatō kokuyōseki gensanchi iseki) is a Jōmon period archaeological site consisting of 193 shallow interconnected pits over a 35,000 square meter area, from which obsidian had been mined, located in what is now part of the town of Nagawa in the Chūbu region Japan. It has been protected as a National Historic Site since 2015.

== Overview ==
The Hoshigatō site is located northwest of slope of Mount Kirigamine at an elevation of 1500 meters, within the Higashimata National Forest in the northeastern part of Shimosuwa. Obsidian, or "volcanic glass" was frequently used for stone tools and weapons in the Japanese Paleolithic period as it could be fractured by lithic reduction to produce sharp blades or arrowheads, and frequently occurs in volcanic formation around Japan. Archaeological excavations have found that obsidian was extracted from this location from the early Jōmon period (about 5700 years ago) through the late Jōmon period (2000–1000 BCE). Physicochemical analysis has found that obsidian from this site was supplied to settlements distributed across an extremely wide range from Tōhoku to the Tōkai region, indicating long distance trade. The site was discovered in 1920, and was excavated from 1959-1961, and again in 1997.

There are no public facilities at the site and access is controlled by the Shimosuwa Town Board of Education.

== See also ==
- List of Historic Sites of Japan (Nagano)
