= Hineno Takayoshi =

Hineno Takayoshi (日根野 高吉, 1539 – August 5, 1600) was a Japanese samurai of the Sengoku period, and first daimyō of Suwa Domain under the Tokugawa Shogunate.

== Career ==
Hineno was originally in the service of Saitō Dōsan of Mino Province; however, after the fall of the Saito, he changed his allegiance to Oda Nobunaga, and subsequently, to Toyotomi Hideyoshi. In 1590, for his services in storming Yamanaka Castle during the Siege of Odawara, he was awarded a 28,000 koku holding at Takashima in Shinano Province. Over the next seven years, he constructed Takashima Castle, otherwise known as the "floating castle of Suwa (ja: 諏訪の浮城). During the invasion of Korea, he remained on guard duty at Nagoya in Hizen Province. In 1600, during the Battle of Sekigahara, he supported the eastern Army under Tokugawa Ieyasu.

== Death ==
He died shortly before the Battle of Sekigahara at the age of 62. His grave is at the temple of Jiun-ji in Suwa, Nagano.
