= Thirty-six Views of Mount Fuji =

Woodblock prints by Katsushika Hokusai

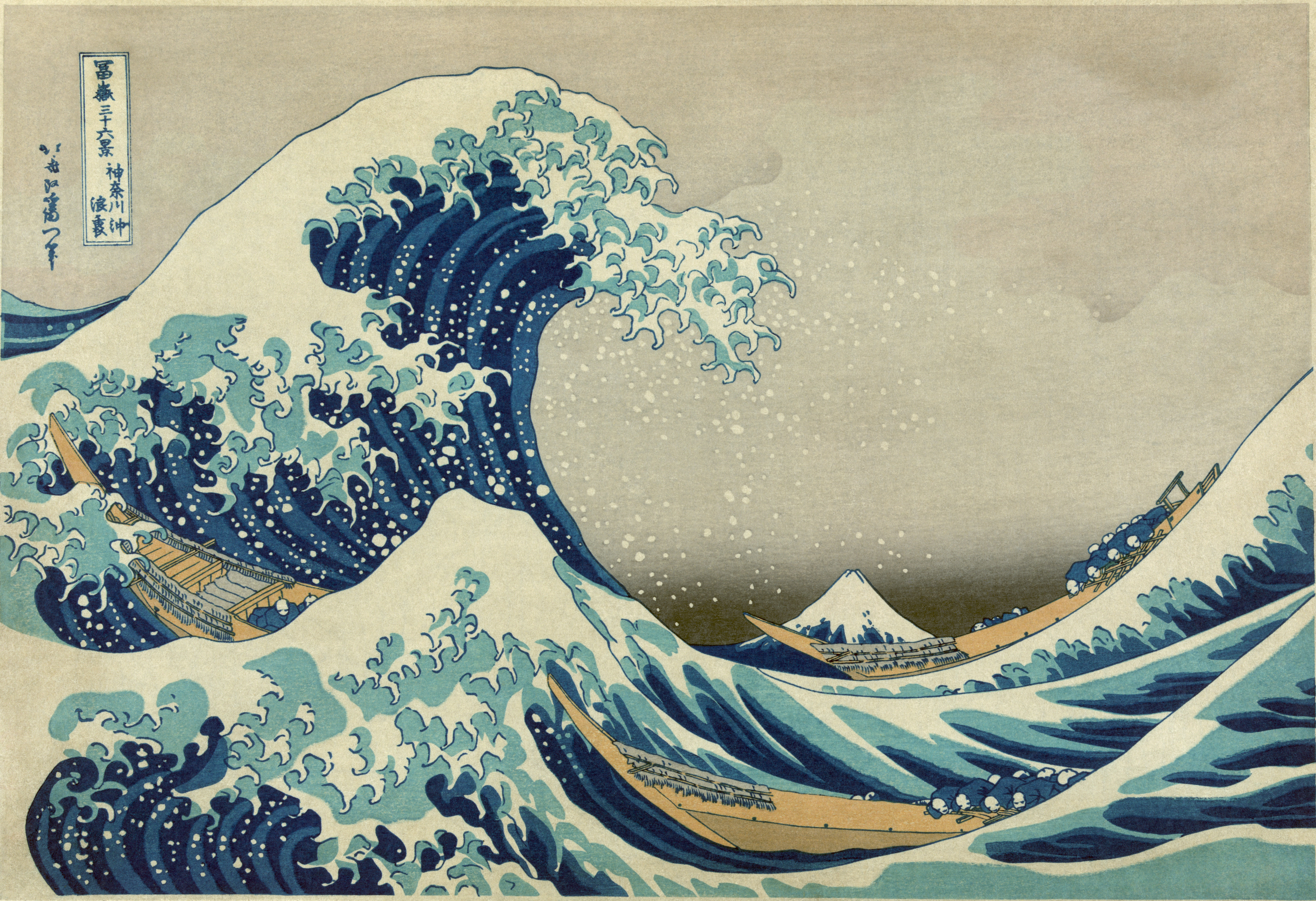
The Great Wave off Kanagawa, the best known print in the series (20th century reprint). Mount Fuji is in the center distance.

Thirty-six Views of Mount Fuji (Japanese: 富嶽三十六景, Hepburn: Fugaku Sanjūrokkei) is a series of landscape prints by the Japanese ukiyo-e artist Hokusai (1760–1849). The series depicts Mount Fuji from different locations and in various seasons and weather conditions. The immediate success of the publication led to another ten prints being added to the series.

The series was produced from c. 1830 to 1832, when Hokusai was in his seventies and at the height of his career, and published by Nishimura Yohachi. Among the prints are three of Hokusai's most famous: The Great Wave off Kanagawa, Fine Wind, Clear Morning, and Thunderstorm Beneath the Summit. The lesser-known Kajikazawa in Kai Province is also considered one of the series' best works. The Thirty-six Views has been described as the artist's "indisputable colour-print masterpiece".

== History ==
Mount Fuji is a popular subject for Japanese art due to its cultural and religious significance. This belief can be traced to The Tale of the Bamboo Cutter, where a goddess deposits the elixir of life on the peak. As the historian Henry Smith explains, "Thus from an early time, Mt. Fuji was seen as the source of the secret of immortality, a tradition that was at the heart of Hokusai's own obsession with the mountain."

Each image was made through a process whereby Hokusai's drawing on paper was glued to a woodblock to guide the carving. The original design is therefore lost in the process. The block was then covered with ink and applied to paper to create the image (see Woodblock printing in Japan for further details). The complexity of Hokusai's images includes the wide range of colors he used, which required the use of a separate block for each color appearing in the image.

The earliest prints in the series were made with largely blue tones (aizuri-e), including the key blocks which provide an image's outlines. Prussian blue pigment had not long before been introduced to Japan from Europe and Hokusai used it extensively, ensuring its popularity. Once the publisher, Nishimura, was sure of the series' success, prints were made with multiple colours (nishiki-e). Nishimura had planned to expand the series to more than a hundred prints, but publication stopped at forty-six.

The most famous single image from the series is widely known in English as The Great Wave off Kanagawa. It is Hokusai's most celebrated work and is often considered the most recognizable work of Japanese art in the world. Another iconic work from Thirty-six Views is Fine Wind, Clear Morning, also known as Red Fuji, which has been described as "one of the simplest and at the same time one of the most outstanding of all Japanese prints".

=== Influence ===
While Hokusai's Thirty-six Views of Mount Fuji is the most famous ukiyo-e series to focus on Mount Fuji, there are several other works with the same subject, including Hiroshige's later series Thirty-six Views of Mount Fuji and Hokusai's subsequent book One Hundred Views of Mount Fuji (published 1834–1835).

In his 1896 book on Hokusai, French art critic Edmond de Goncourt wrote that despite its "rather crude colors", it was, "the album which inspires the landscapes of the impressionists of the present moment." The French artist Henri Rivière (1864–1951) published the set of color lithographs "Thirty-six views of the Tour Eiffel" in 1902, inspired by the seminal print set of Hokusai, one of the many influences of Japanese art on late 19th century and early 20th century French art (Japonism, known as "Japonisme" in French)

== Prints ==
=== Original thirty-six ===
No.	Image	English title	Japanese title
1		The Great Wave off Kanagawa	神奈川沖浪裏 Kanagawa oki nami-ura
2		Fine Wind, Clear Morning, also known as South Wind, Clear Sky or Red Fuji	凱風快晴 Gaifū kaisei
3		Thunderstorm Beneath the Summit	山下白雨 Sanka hakuu
4		Under Mannen Bridge at Fukagawa	深川万年橋下 Fukagawa Mannen-bashi shita
5		Sundai, Edo	東都駿台 Tōto Sundai
6		The Cushion Pine at Aoyama	青山円座松 Aoyama Enza-no-matsu
7		Senju (state station) in Musashi Province	武州千住 Bushū Senju
8		Tama River in Musashi Province	武州玉川 Bushū Tama-gawa
9		Inume Pass in Kai Province	甲州犬目峠 Kōshū Inume-tōge
10		Fujimigahara Field in Owari Province	尾州不二見原 Bishū Fujimigahara
11		Asakusa Hongan Temple in Edo	東都浅草本願寺 Tōto Asakusa Hongan-ji
12		Tsukuda Island in Edo	武陽佃島 Buyō Tsukuda-jima
13		Shichirigahama in Sagami Province	相州七里浜 Soshū Shichirigahama
14		Umezawa in Sagami Province (near present-day Ninomiya, Kanagawa)	相州梅沢左 Soshū Umezawa-no-hidari
15		Kajikazawa in Kai Province	甲州石班沢 Kōshū Kajikazawa
16		Mishima Pass in Kai Province (near present-day Kagosaka Pass)	甲州三嶌越 Kōshū Mishima-goe
17		A View of Mount Fuji Across Lake Suwa (Lake Suwa in Shinano Province)	信州諏訪湖 Shinshū Suwa-ko
18		Ejiri in Suruga Province	駿州江尻 Sunshū Ejiri
19		In the Mountains of Tōtōmi Province	遠江山中 Tōtōmi san-chū
20		Ushibori in Hitachi Province (present-day Itako, Ibaraki)	常州牛堀 Jōshū Ushibori
21		A Sketch of the Mitsui Shop in Suruga in Edo (present-day Muromachi, Tokyo)	江都駿河町三井見世略図 Kōto Suruga-cho Mitsui-mise ryakuzu
22		Sunset Across Ryōgoku Bridge from Ommayagashi (present-day Kuramae, Taitō, Tokyo)	御厩川岸より両国橋夕陽見 Ommayagashi yori Ryōgoku-bashi yūhi-mi
23		Sazaidō at Gohyakurakan Temple	五百らかん寺さざゐどう Gohyakurakan-ji Sazaidō
24		Morning After a Snowfall at Koishikawa	礫川雪の旦 Koishikawa yuki no ashita
25		Shimomeguro	下目黒 Shimomeguro
26		Watermill at Onden	隠田の水車 Onden no suisha
27		Enoshima in Sagami Province	相州江の島 Soshū Enoshima
28		Sketch of Tago Bay, Ejiri Along the Tōkaidō	東海道江尻田子の浦略図 Tōkaidō Ejiri Tago-no-ura ryakuzu
29		Yoshida Along the Tōkaidō	東海道吉田 Tōkaidō Yoshida
30		Kazusa Province Sea Route	上総の海路 Kazusa no kairo
31		Nihonbashi in Edo	江戸日本橋 Edo Nihonbashi
32		Sekiya Village on the Sumida River (near present-day Keisei Sekiya Station)	隅田川関屋の里 Sumida-gawa Sekiya-no-sato
33		Noboto Bay (present-day Chūō-ku, Chiba)	登戸浦 Noboto-ura
34		Hakone Lake in Sagami Province	相州箱根湖水 Sōshū Hakone-kosui
35		Reflection from Misaka Pass in Kai Province (in Lake Kawaguchi)	甲州三坂水面 Kōshū Misaka suimen
36		Hodogaya Along the Tōkaidō	東海道保土ケ谷 Tōkaidō Hodogaya

=== Additional 10 ===
No.	Image	English title	Japanese title
1 (37)		Tate River from the Timberyard at Honjo (in present-day Sumida, Tokyo)	本所立川 Honjo Tatekawa
2 (38)		A View of Mount Fuji from the Pleasure District at Senju (state station)	従千住花街眺望の不二 Senju Hana-machi yori chōbō no Fuji
3 (39)		Gotenyama, Shinagawa Along the Tōkaidō	東海道品川御殿山の不二 Tōkaidō Shinagawa Goten'yama no Fuji
4 (40)		Nakahara in Sagami Province (in present-day Hiratsuka, Kanagawa)	相州仲原 Sōshū Nakahara
5 (41)		Dawn at Isawa in Kai Province	甲州伊沢暁 Kōshū Isawa no Akatsuki
6 (42)		The Back of Fuji from the Minobu River (possibly actually the Fuji River near present-day Minobu, Yamanashi)	身延川裏不二 Minobu-gawa ura Fuji
7 (43)		Ōno Field in Suruga Province	駿州大野新田 Sunshū Ōno-shinden
8 (44)		Tea Plantation at Katakura in Suruga Province (near present-day Nakano, Fuji, Shizuoka)	駿州片倉茶園の不二 Sunshū Katakura-chaen no Fuji
9 (45)		Kanaya Along the Tōkaidō	東海道金谷の不二 Tōkaidō Kanaya no Fuji
10 (46)		Climbing on Fuji	諸人登山 Shojin tozan

== Exhibitions ==
There are fewer than 10 complete sets of the Thirty-six Views of Mount Fuji, with prominent pieces held at the Metropolitan Museum of Art, MFA Boston, the British Museum, and the Bibliothèque nationale de France. A collection of Thirty-six Views of Mount Fuji prints contained in the wellness spa of the Costa Concordia was lost when the ship sank on January 13, 2012.

In the spring of 2012, all forty-six prints (the original thirty-six plus the ten additions) were featured in the exhibition Hokusai: 36 Views of Mount Fuji at the National Museum of Asian Art in Washington, D.C..

The Thirty-six Views of Mount Fuji prints were displayed at the Museum of Fine Arts, Boston as part of a Hokusai exhibit from 5 April to 9 August, 2015.

The Thirty-six Views of Mount Fuji prints were displayed at the National Gallery of Victoria in Melbourne, Australia as part of a Hokusai exhibit from 21 July through 22 October 2017. The exhibit featured two copies of The Great Wave off Kanagawa, one from the NGV and one from Japan Ukiyo-e Museum.

From 20 October 2026 to 17 January 2027, the Dulwich Picture Gallery exhibited Thirty-six Views of Mount Fuji plus the additional 10 prints from The Iuchi Collection (currently on deposit at the National Museum of Western Art, Tokyo).

== Markets ==
Thirty-six Views of Mount Fuji is often sold in prominent auction houses focused on Japanese art, such as that of Christie's, Sotheby's, Bonhams, etc.

In 2002, a complete set sold at Sotheby's went for $1.47 million, through an anonymous buyer.

In 2013, another complete set was assembled by Dr. Jitendra V. Singh, a professor from Wharton School, who was inspired by Mt. Fuji from seeing the mountain on flights to Japan as well as his previous Hindu pilgrimages to Mount Everest and Mount Kailash. He purchased Fuji Seen From Kanaya on the Tokaido first, with the iconic pieces acquired from 2014 to 2016, the final print was acquired in January 2023.

On 19 March 2024, the Singh collection went onto auction at Christie's, which then sold for $3.559 million from an estimated bid of $3–5 million. The proceeds has gone into Singh's trust.

== See also ==
- One Hundred Views of Mount Fuji
- Three Views of Japan
- Thirty-six Views of Mount Fuji by Hiroshige
