= Shimosuwa =

Shimosuwa 下諏訪町
- Town
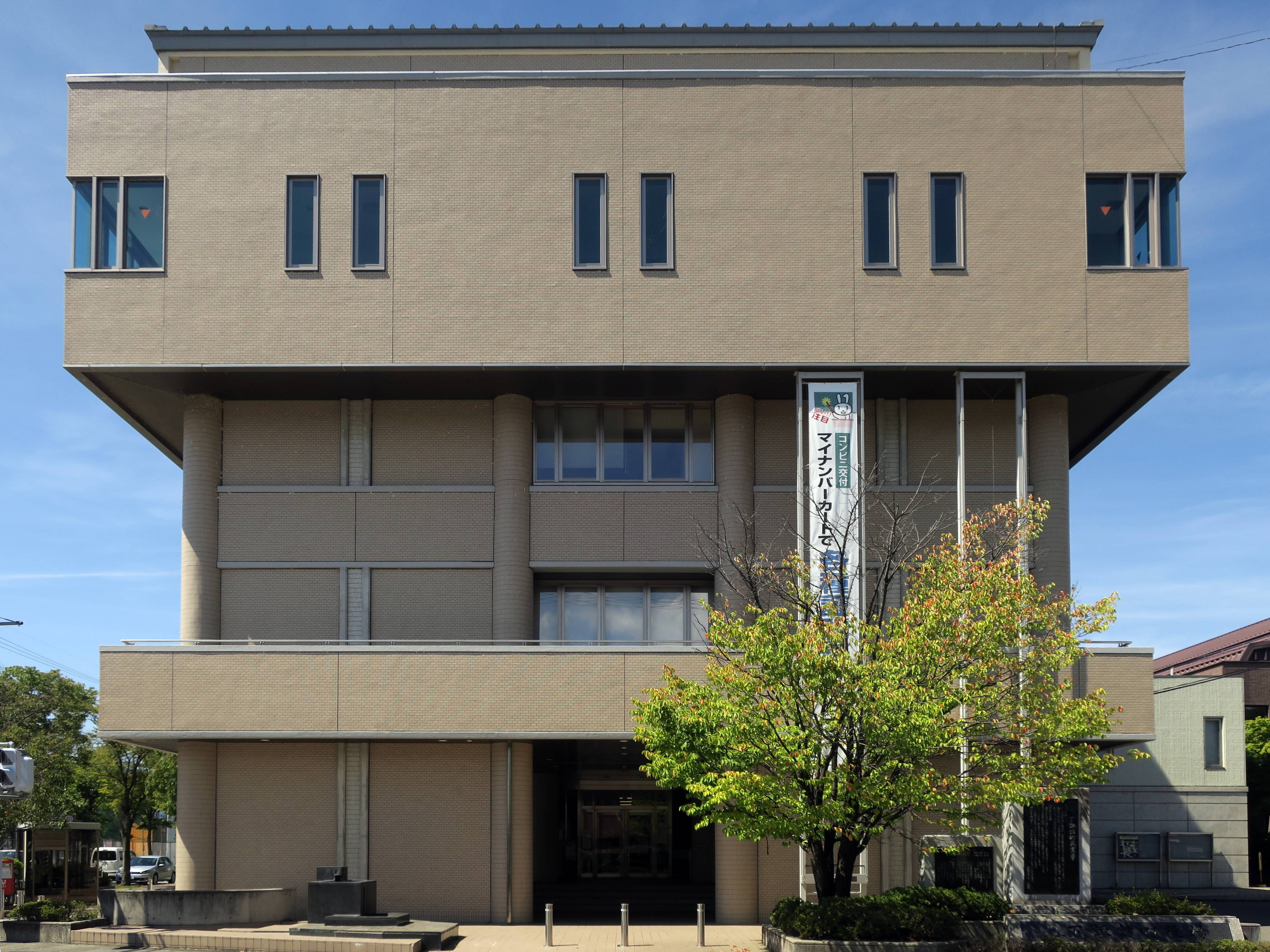
- Shimosuwa Town Hall

- Flag Seal

- Location of Shimosuwa in Nagano Prefecture

- Coordinates: 36°4′10.4″N 138°4′48.7″E
- Country: Japan
- Region: Chūbu (Kōshin'etsu)
- Prefecture: Nagano
- District: Suwa

Area
  - Total: 66.87 km^{2} (25.82 sq mi)

Population (April 2019)
  - Total: 20,055
  - Density: 299.9/km^{2} (776.8/sq mi)
- Time zone: UTC+9 (Japan Standard Time)
- Symbols
  - Tree: Sakura
  - Flower: Azalea
- Phone number: 0266-27-1111
- Address: 4613-8 Nishitakanochō, Shimosuwa-machi, Suwa-gun, Nagano-ken 393-8501
- Website: Official website

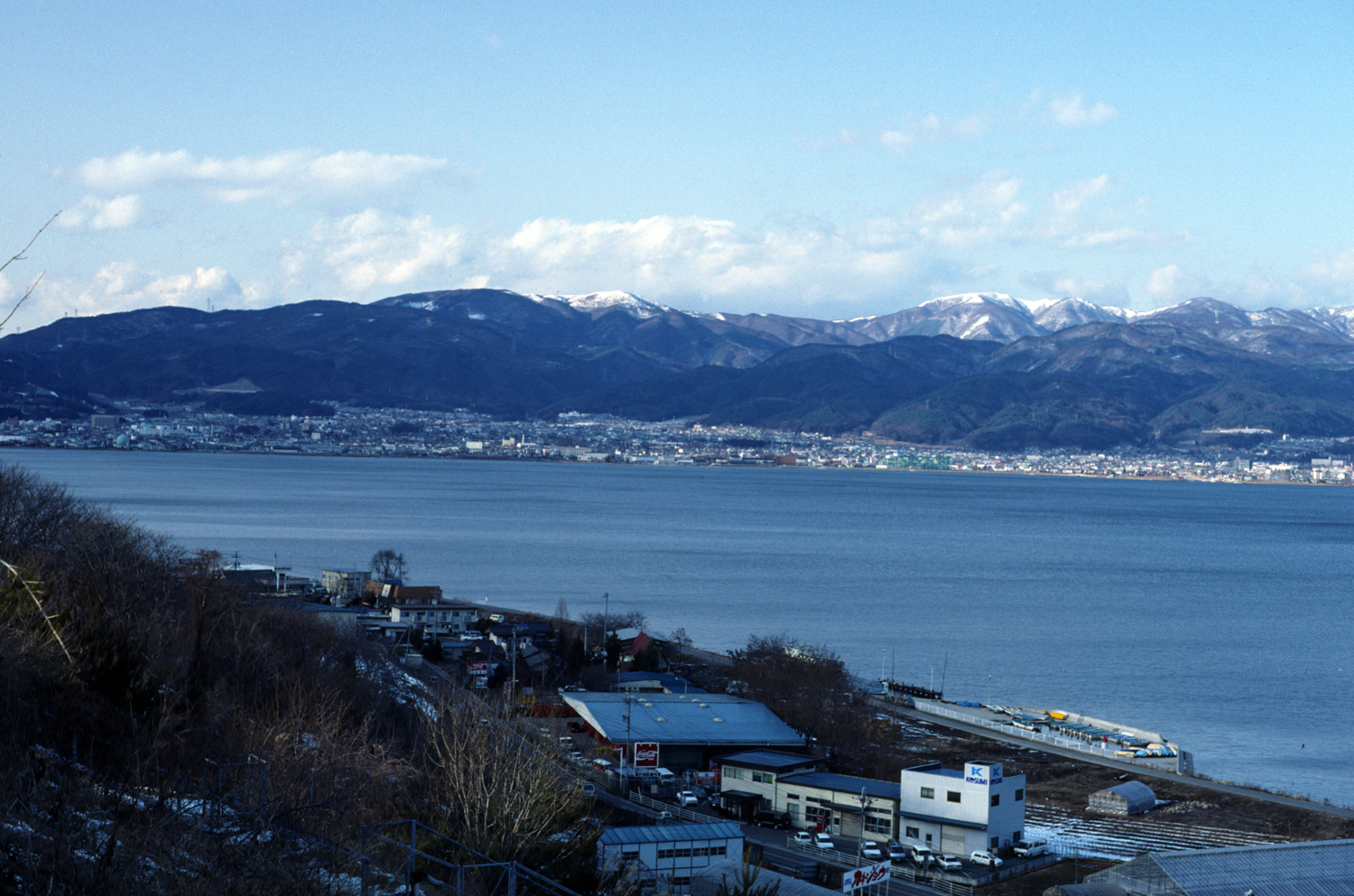
Lake Suwa from Shimosuwa town

Shimosuwa (下諏訪町, Shimosuwa-machi) is a town located in Nagano Prefecture, Japan. As of 1 April 2019, the town had an estimated population of 20,055 in 8864 households, and a population density of 300 persons per km^{2}. The total area of the town is 66.87 square kilometres (25.82 sq mi).

== Geography ==
Shimosuwa is located in central Nagano Prefecture, approximately 50 kilometers from the prefectural capital of Nagano city and 200 kilometers from Tokyo. The town is bordered on the south by Lake Suwa. The town has an altitude of 760 meters at the town center, and is 82% forested.

=== Surrounding municipalities ===
- Nagano Prefecture
  - Matsumoto
  - Nagawa
  - Okaya
  - Suwa

=== Climate ===
The town has a humid continental climate characterized by warm and humid summers, and cold winters (Köppen climate classification Dfb). The average annual temperature in Shimosuwa is 7.3 °C. The average annual rainfall is 1540 mm with September as the wettest month. The temperatures are highest on average in August, at around 20.2 °C, and lowest in January, at around -5.1 °C.

== Demographics ==
Per Japanese census data, the population of Shimosuwa has been declining at a low but accelerating rate over the past 50 years.

Historical population
Year	Pop.	±%
1940	17,619	—
1950	18,798	+6.7%
1960	22,602	+20.2%
1970	26,932	+19.2%
1980	26,574	−1.3%
1990	25,519	−4.0%
2000	23,930	−6.2%
2010	21,504	−10.1%
2020	19,155	−10.9%

== History ==
The area of present-day Shimosuwa was part of ancient Shinano Province, and was administered as part of the territories of Suwa Domain under the Tokugawa shogunate. During the Edo period, Shimosuwa-shuku developed as the 29th station on the 59-station Nakasendō highway connecting Edo with Kyoto and was also a post station on the Kōshū Kaidō.

The village of Shimosuwa was created with the establishment of the modern municipalities system on April 1, 1889, and was raised to town status on June 30, 1893.

== Education ==
Shimosuwa has two public elementary schools and two public middle schools operated by the town government, and one high school operated the Nagano Prefectural Board of Education.

== Transportation ==
=== Railway ===
- East Japan Railway Company - Chūō Main Line
  - Shimo-Suwa

=== Highway ===
- National Route 20
- National Route 142

== International relations ==
- – Kaifeng, Henan, China

== Local attractions ==
Shimosuwa is the location of two of the shrines that make up the famous Suwa Taisha or Suwa Grand Shrine. The Harumiya (春宮) and Akimiya (秋宮) shrines are symbolically renewed every seven years during the Onbashira festival. Huge trees are cut in a Shinto ceremony, then the logs are dragged from the mountains down to the shrines.

Shimosuwa is also the site of several onsen or natural hot spring spas.

The Hoshigatō obsidian mine site, a Jomon period trace and National Historic Site is located in Shimosuwa, but there are no public facilities or access.

== Notable people from Shimosuwa ==
- Yasuyuki Kazama, racing driver
- Shinpei Takagi, actor, movie director
