= Takashima Castle =

Japanese castle

Coordinates: 36°2′23.25″N 138°6′43.27″E

- 高島城
- Suwa, Nagano Prefecture, Japan
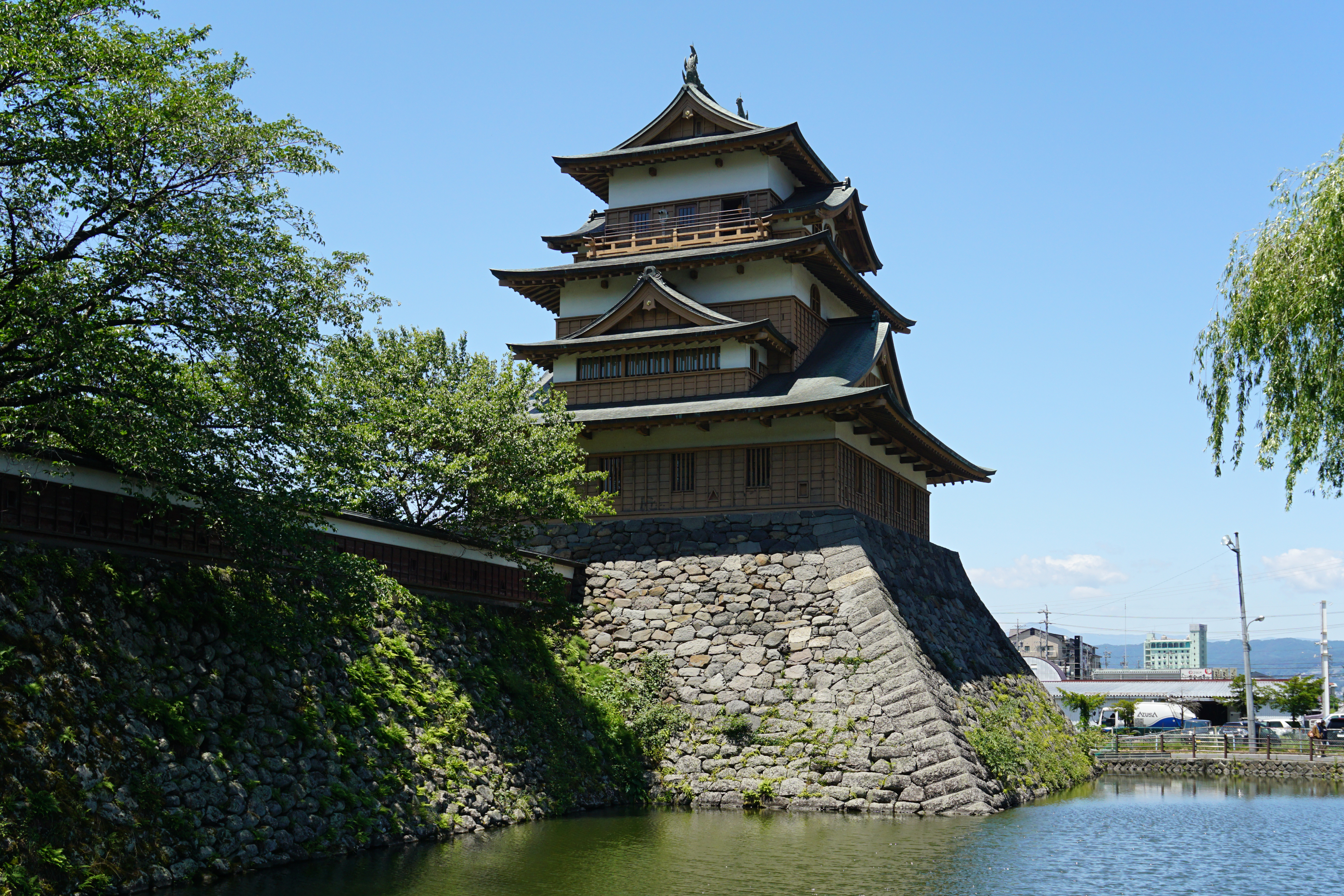
- reconstructed donjon of Takashima Castle

Site information
- Type: flatland-style Japanese castle
- Open to the public: yes
- Condition: partially reconstructed

Location

Site history
- Built: 1592
- Built by: Hideno Takayoshi
- In use: Edo period
- Demolished: 1875

Takashima Castle (高島城, Takashima-jō) is a Japanese castle located in Suwa, central Nagano Prefecture, Japan. At the end of the Edo period, Takashima Castle was home to the Suwa clan, daimyō of Takashima Domain. The castle is also known as The Floating Castle of Suwa (諏訪の浮城, Suwa-no-uki-shirō) or Shimazaki Castle (島崎城, Shimazaki-jō)

== Situation ==
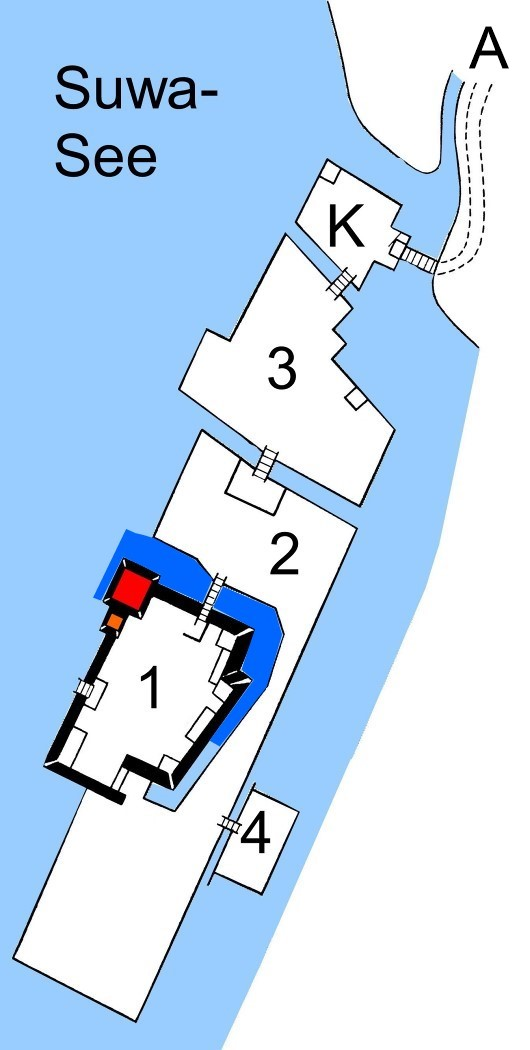
Plan of Takashima Castle

Takashima Castle is originally built on a peninsula extending into Lake Suwa, with the lake itself forming part of its moats. This meant that only the side facing the shore had to have strong ramparts. The Main Bailey (Honmaru) [1] was connected to the Second Bailey (Ni-no-maru) [2] and Third Bailey (San-no-Maru) [3] by bridges, with the Main Bastion (Koromo-no-nami kuruwa (衣之波曲輪 )) [K] containing the Main Gate (Ōtemon) [A] facing the shore. During the Edo period, increasing sedimentation of Lake Suwa left the castle surrounded by land, and the site is now located the middle of the modern city of Suwa.

Today, the area is a public park. Only the north and east side of the moat has been preserved. In 1970, some of the castle structures were reconstructed, but are not historically accurate. The castle was listed as one of the Continued Top 100 Japanese Castles in 2017.

== History ==
The area around Lake Suwa had been under the control of the Suwa clan since at least the early Heian period; however, the Suwa were conquered in the Sengoku period by Takeda Shingen, who annexed the area to his territories. Takashima Castle was ruled by a succession of Takeda generals (beginning with Itagaki Nobukata) until the defeat and annihilation of the Takeda clan at the Battle of Nagashino in 1575.

The area then came under the control of Oda Nobunaga, who assigned it to one of his generals, Kawajiri Hidetaka. After Nobunaga was assassinated in the Honnō-ji incident, the territory came under the control of Toyotomi Hideyoshi, who assigned Hineno Takayoshi as daimyō of Suwa Domain. Hineno Takayoshi began a complete reconstruction of the castle, which was completed by his son, Hineno Yoshiakira. The Hineno were reassigned in 1601, and the domain was returned to the hands of the Suwa clan by Tokugawa Ieyasu. The Suwa remained in control of the castle until the Meiji restoration.

Following the establishment of the Meiji government and the abolition of the han system, the remaining structures of the castle were dismantled in 1875, leaving only the stone foundations. A Shinto Shrine dedicated to the war dead was established within the grounds in 1900 and the area of the Second and Third Baileys was built over as a residential district. The present donjon, yagura and gates are all reconstructions, which were completed in 1970.

== Literature ==
- De Lange, William (2021). An Encyclopedia of Japanese Castles. Groningen: Toyo Press. pp. 600 pages. ISBN 978-9492722300.
- Takada, Tōru: Takashima-jo in: Miura, Masayuki (ed.): Shiro to Jinya. Tokoku-hen. Gakken, 2006. ISBN 978-4-05-604378-5, S. 100th
- Nishigaya, Yasuhiro (ed.): Takashima-jo. In: Nihon Meijo Zukan, Rikogaku-sha, 1993. ISBN 4-8445-3017-8 .
- Schmorleitz, Morton S. (1974). Castles in Japan. Tokyo: Charles E. Tuttle Co. pp. 144–145. ISBN 0-8048-1102-4.
- Motoo, Hinago (1986). Japanese Castles. Tokyo: Kodansha. p. 200 pages. ISBN 0-87011-766-1.
- Mitchelhill, Jennifer (2004). Castles of the Samurai: Power and Beauty. Tokyo: Kodansha. p. 112 pages. ISBN 4-7700-2954-3.
- Turnbull, Stephen (2003). Japanese Castles 1540-1640. Osprey Publishing. p. 64 pages. ISBN 1-84176-429-9.
