= Sundai, Edo =

Woodblock print by Hokusai

- Japanese: Tōto Sundai (東都駿台)
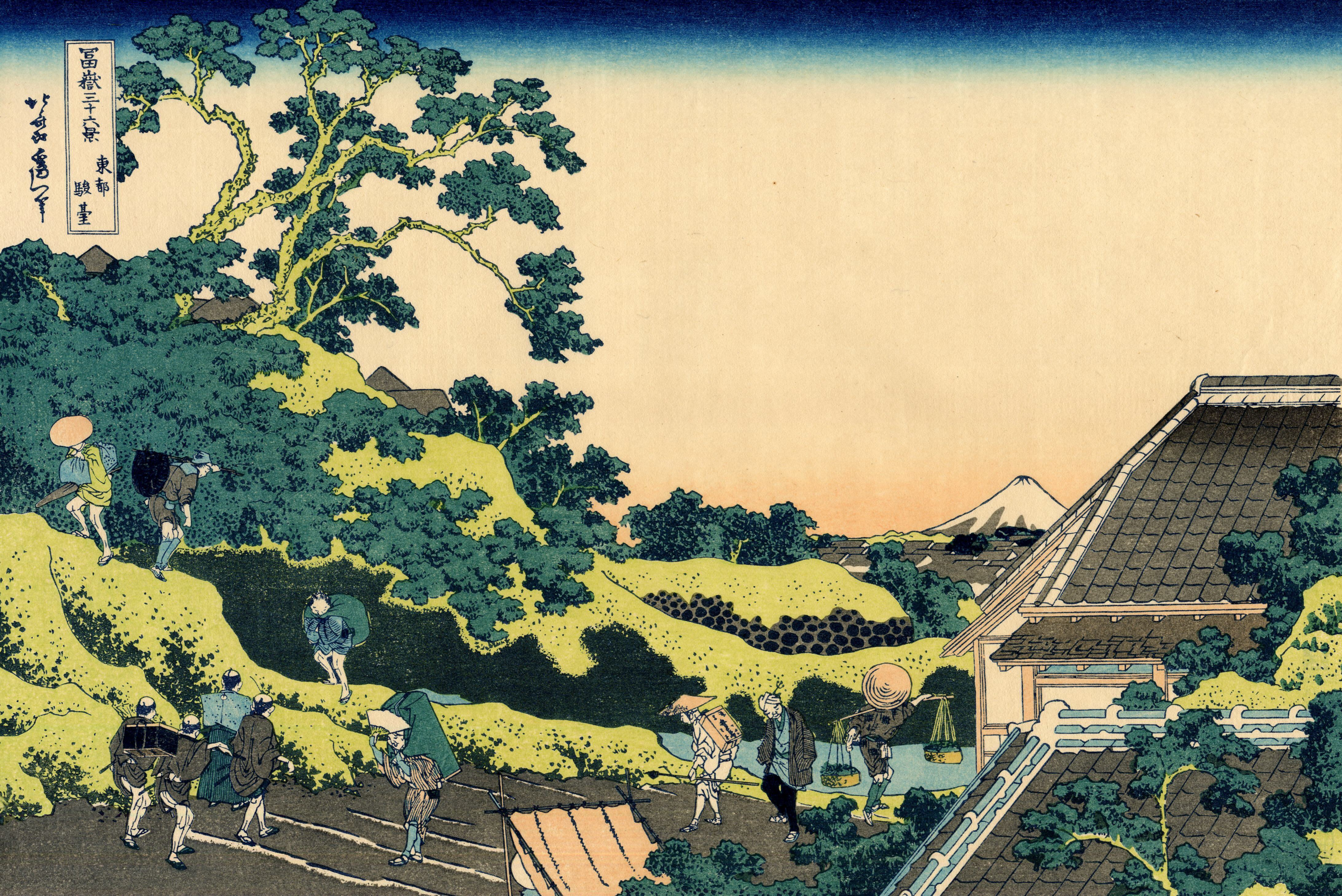
- Artist: Hokusai
- Year: c. 1830–32
- Medium: Woodblock print
- Dimensions: 24.8 cm × 36.5 cm (9.8 in × 14.4 in)
- Location: Metropolitan Museum of Art
- Website: Sundai, Edo

Sundai, Edo is a woodblock print by the Japanese ukiyo-e artist Hokusai. It was produced as the fifth print in the series Thirty-six Views of Mount Fuji from c. 1830 to 1832 in the late Edo period.

== Image ==
=== Description ===
This print is a yoko-e, that is, a landscape format produced to the ōban size, about 25 cm high by 37 cm wide.

It is a polychrome woodblock print, composed of ink and color on paper.

The composition is made up of travelers and workers on a road, with a large pine tree on the left side, the corner of a house on the right, and Mount Fuji in the distance.
