= Suwa Domain =

Suwa Domain 諏訪藩
- under Tokugawa shogunate Japan
- 1590–1871
- Capital: Takashima Castle
- Area
  - Coordinates: 36°2′23.25″N 138°6′43.27″E
- Government
  - Type: Daimyō
- Historical era: Edo period
  - Established: 1590
  - Disestablished: 1871
- Today part of: part of Nagano Prefecture

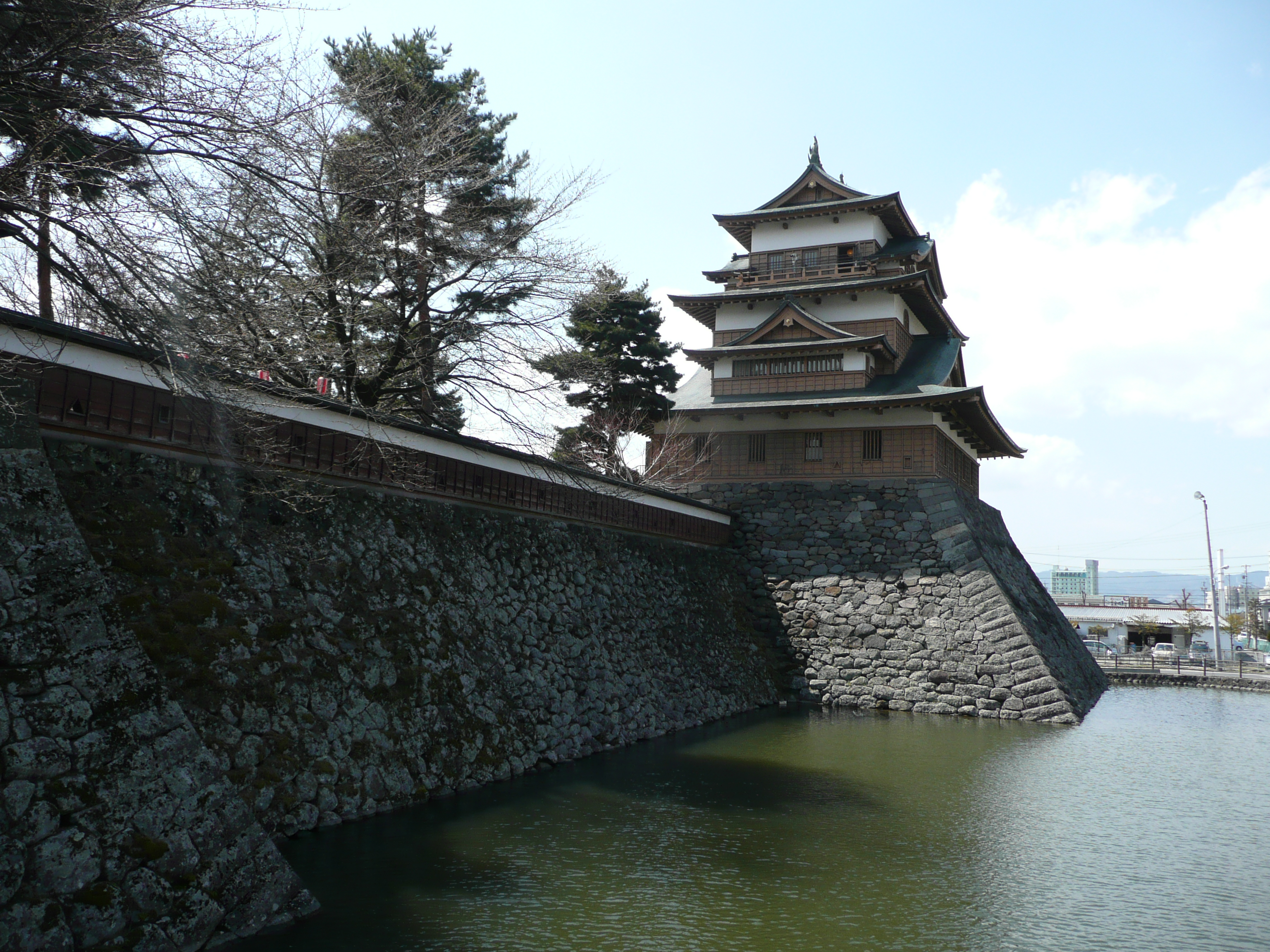
Takashima Castle, administrative centre of Suwa Domain

Suwa Domain (諏訪藩, Suwa-han) was a feudal domain under the Tokugawa shogunate of Edo period Japan. It was located in Shinano Province, Honshū. The domain was centered at Takashima Castle, located in what is now part of the town of Suwa in Nagano Prefecture. It was also known as Takashima Domain (高島藩, Takashima-han).

== History ==
The Suwa clan had ruled the area around Lake Suwa in Shinano Province since ancient times. The clan was defeated by Takeda Shingen in 1542. The final Suwa ruler, Suwa Yorishige was forced to commit seppuku; however, his nephew, Suwa Yoritada was spared as hereditary kannushi of Suwa Shrine. After the Takeda clan was destroyed by an alliance of Oda Nobunaga and Tokugawa Ieyasu, Suwa Yoritada went into the service of the Tokugawa. Following the Siege of Odawara (1590), he was elevated to the status of daimyō with Sōja Domain, a 10,000 koku holding in Kōzuke Province. This was subsequently raised to 27,000 koku. In the meanwhile, Toyotomi Hideyoshi assigned the former Suwa territories in Shinano Province to Hineno Takayoshi. Hineno Takayoshi built Takashima Castle; however, in 1601, his son Hineno Yoshiaki, was demoted to Mibu Domain in Shimotsuke Province as his grandfather, Hineno Hironari had defected to the Osaka forces. The same year, Suwa Yoritada's son, Suwa Yorimizu, was allowed to reclaim his clan's ancestral lands as daimyō of Suwa Domain. His son, Suwa Tadatsune, was granted a 5000 koku increase for services during the Siege of Osaka, but his son, Suwa Tadaharu, gave 2000 koku away to his two younger brothers. The Suwa clan remained in control of the domain to the Meiji restoration.

During the Boshin War, the domain supported the imperial side, and participated in the Battle of Kōshū-Katsunuma, Battle of Hokuetsu and Battle of Aizu. In July 1871, with the abolition of the han system, Suwa Domain briefly became Takashima Prefecture, and was merged into the newly created Nagano Prefecture. Under the new Meiji government, Suwa Tadamasa, the next-to-last daimyō of Suwa Domain was given the kazoku peerage title of shishaku (viscount).

== Bakumatsu period holdings ==
As with most domains in the han system, Suwa Domain consisted of several discontinuous territories calculated to provide the assigned kokudaka, based on periodic cadastral surveys and projected agricultural yields.

- Shinano Province
  - 11 villages in Chikuma District
  - 150 villages in Suwa District

== List of daimyō ==
| # | Name | Tenure | Courtesy title | Court Rank | kokudaka | Notes |
|---|---|---|---|---|---|---|
Hineno clan (tozama) 1590-1601
| 0 | Hineno Takayoshi (日根野高吉) | 1590-1600 | Oribe-no-tsukasa (織部正) | Junior 5th Rank, Lower Grade (従五位下) | 27,000 koku | pre-Tokugawa |
| 1 | Hineno Yoshiaki (日根野吉明) | 1600-1601 | Oribe-no-tsukasa (織部正) | Junior 5th Rank, Lower Grade (従五位下) | 27,000 koku | transfer to Mibu Domain |
Suwa clan (fudai) 1601-1871
| 1 | Suwa Yorimizu (諏訪頼水) | 1601-1640 | Inaba-no-kami (因幡守) | Junior 5th Rank, Lower Grade (従五位下) | 27,000 koku | transfer from Sōja Domain |
| 2 | Suwa Tadatsune (諏訪忠恒) | 1640-1657 | Izumo-no-kami (出雲守) | Junior 5th Rank, Lower Grade (従五位下)) | 27,000 -> 32,000 koku | |
| 3 | Suwa Tadaharu (諏訪忠晴) | 1657-1695 | Inaba-no-kami (因幡守) | Junior 5th Rank, Lower Grade (従五位下)) | 32,000 -> 30,000 koku | |
| 4 | Suwa Tadatora (諏訪忠虎) | 1695-1731 | Aki-no-kami (安芸守) | Junior 5th Rank, Lower Grade (従五位下) | 30,000 koku | |
| 5 | Suwa Tadatoki (諏訪忠林) | 1731-1763 | Inaba-no-kami (因幡守) | Junior 5th Rank, Lower Grade (従五位下) | 30,000 koku | |
| 6 | Suwa Tadaatsu (諏訪忠厚) | 1763-1781 | Aki-no-kami (安芸守) | Junior 5th Rank, Lower Grade (従五位下)) | 30,000 koku | |
| 7 | Suwa Tadakata (諏訪忠粛) | 1781-1816 | Ise-no-kami (伊勢守) | Junior 5th Rank, Lower Grade (従五位下) | 30,000 koku | |
| 8 | Suwa Tadamichi (諏訪忠恕) | 1816-1840 | Ise-no-kami (伊勢守) | Junior 5th Rank, Lower Grade (従五位下)) | 30,000 koku | |
| 9 | Suwa Tadamasa (諏訪忠誠) | 1840-1868 | Inaba-no-kami (因幡守) | Junior 4th Rank, Lower Grade (従四位下) | 30,000 koku | |
| 10 | Suwa Tadaaya (諏訪忠礼) | 1868-1871 | Ise-no-kami (伊勢守) | Junior 5th Rank, Lower Grade (従五位下) | 30,000 koku | Domainal governor |

=== Suwa Yorimizu ===
Suwa Yorimizu (諏訪頼水; January 18, 1571 – February 23, 1642) was an early Edo period daimyō and hereditary chieftain of the Suwa clan. In 1577, at the age of six, he succeeded his father as head kannushi of the Suwa Shrine. In 1590, his father fought in the retinue of Tokugawa Ieyasu during the Siege of Odawara and when Toyotomi Hideyoshi ordered Tokugawa Ieyasu to exchange his domains for new territories in the Kantō region he was forced to abandon his ancestral lands in Shinano Province and accompany his liege to Musashi. He was subsequently raised to the status of daimyō of Sōja Domain in Kōzuke Province (10,000 koku). Yorimizu succeeded his father as daimyō in 1601. However, later that year Ieyasu permitted him to return to the ancestral Suwa lands in Shinano with an increase in kokudaka to 27,000 koku. The marked the creation of Suwa Domain under the Tokugawa shogunate. and he participated in the second Siege of Ueda with Tokugawa Hidetada. In 1614, during the Siege of Osaka, he was ordered to defend Kōfu Castle and his son Suwa Tadatsune was sent to the front lines to command the Suwa forces in his place. Despite his lack of accomplishments in battle, he was highly regarded by Shogun Tokugawa Iemitsu, and was entrusted by the shogunate as jailor to the disgraced Matsudaira Tadateru. He retired in 1640 and died the following year at the age of 72. Although noted as an enlightened ruler who restored waste land and opened considerable new rice lands and who improved the lot of his peasants, Yorimizu also had a rougher side. When a criminal took refuge in the Suwa clan temple of Himei-ji, the monks refused to surrender him to secular authorities, citing the special privileges of the clergy. An enraged Yorimizu ordered that the temple be burned down and cut off the heads of the criminal and the offending monks. He built Raigaku-ji as a new clan temple in 1631 in what is now the city of Chino, Nagano. Yorimizu was married to a daughter of Honda Yasushige of Okazaki Domain.

=== Suwa Tadatsune ===
Suwa Tadatsune (諏訪忠恒; May 13, 1595 – November 4, 1657) was the 2nd daimyō of Suwa and hereditary chieftain of the Suwa clan. Tadatsune was the eldest son of Suwa Yorimizu. In 1607, the Shōgun Tokugawa Hidetada presided over his genpuku ceremony, giving him a sword and the kanji for "Tada" in his name. he was initially named "Tadayori" (忠頼), but changed his name to Tadanobu (忠澄) and later to Tadatsune. During the Siege of Osaka he led Suwa forces into battle under the overall command of Sakakibara Yasukatsu, and was at the Battle of Yao and Battle of Tennōji. as a reward for his services in combat, he received 5000 koku in Chikuma District, Shinano. He became daimyō on the retirement of his father in 1640, and continued his father's policies of developing new rice lands. He ruled to his death in 1657. He was married to a daughter of Inaba Norimichi of Usuki Domain.

=== Suwa Tadaharu ===
Suwa Tadaharu (諏訪忠晴; September 18, 1639 – April 14, 1695) was the 3rd daimyō of Suwa and hereditary chieftain of the Suwa clan. Tadaharu was the eldest son of Suwa Tadatsune and became daimyō on the death of his father in 1657. At that time, he gave 1000 koku of his domains to each of his two younger brothers, reducing the kokudaka of Suwa Domain from 32,000 to 30,000 koku. In terms of domain politics, he conducted a through survey of his territories. he was also an artist in the Kano school and noted for his literary efforts. He held a number of minor positions within the Shogunal administration. He ruled to his death in 1695 at the age of 57. He was married to a daughter of Naitō Tadaoki of Iwakitaira Domain.

=== Suwa Tadatora ===
Suwa Tadatora (諏訪忠虎; April 22, 1666 – August 4, 1731) was the 4th daimyō of Suwa and hereditary chieftain of the Suwa clan. Tadatora was the third son of Suwa Tadaharu and was noted for his scholarship at an early age. Shōgun Tokugawa Ietsuna personally acted as his tutor. He became daimyō on the death of his father in 1695. However, his tenure was marred by the destruction of the clan's Edo residence in the 1703 Genroku earthquake, the rebuilding of which plunged they domain into debt. He died in 1731 at the age of 69. He was married to a daughter of Matsudaira Masakatsu of the short-lived Matsuoka Domain in Echigo.

=== Suwa Tadatoki ===
Suwa Tadatoki (諏訪忠林; September 22, 1703 – June 20, 1770) was the 5th daimyō of Suwa and hereditary chieftain of the Suwa clan. Tadatoki was the son of Suwa Yoriatsu, a hatamoto descendant of Suwa Yorimizu's younger son and Edo Machi-bugyō. He married a daughter of Suwa Tadatora shortly before the latter's death and was adopted as heir, as the only son of Takatora had pre-deceased his father. He became daimyō on Tadatora's death in 1731. Although noted for his scholarship and poetry, he was in poor health and left much of the domain's administration to his retainers. He retired in 1763 and died in 1770 at the age of 68.

=== Suwa Tadaatsu ===
Suwa Tadaatsu (諏訪忠厚; November 12, 1746 – July 25, 1812) was the 6th daimyō of Suwa and hereditary chieftain of the Suwa clan. Tadaatsu was the fourth son of Suwa Tadatoki, and became daimyō on Tadatoki's retirement in 1763. He attempted to reform the domain's finances, but only succeeded in splitting his senior retainers into pro-reform and anti-reform factions. This resulted in an O-Ie Sōdō which further paralyzed the domain administration. Tadakatsu was forced into retirement in 1781, and several members of the pro-reform faction were forced to commit seppuku the following year. Tadaatsu died in 1812 at the age of 67. He was married to a daughter of Abe Masayoshi of Fukuyama Domain.

=== Suwa Tadakata ===
Suwa Tadakata (諏訪忠粛; May 19, 1768 – August 14, 1822) was the 7th daimyō of Suwa and hereditary chieftain of the Suwa clan. Tadakata was the eldest son of Suwa Tadaatsu, and became daimyō on his father's forced retirement in 1781. He continued the domain's time-honored policies of opening new rice lands, accurate surveying, and promoted the production of carpentry tools as a clan monopoly. In 1803, he opened a han school to teach rangaku western sciences, and invited a doctor trained in western medicine from Nagasaki. Tadakata retired in 1816 and died in 1822 at the age of 55. He was married to a daughter of Matsudaira Norisada of Nishio Domain.

=== Suwa Tadamichi ===
Suwa Tadamichi (諏訪忠恕; November 26, 1800 – May 21, 1851) was the 8th daimyō of Suwa and hereditary chieftain of the Suwa clan. Tadakata was the eldest son of Suwa Tadakata, and became daimyō on his father's retirement in 1816. He continued his father's policies, but also encouraged sericulture and increasing irrigation canals from Lake Suwa. However, his tenure was beset by disasters, including crop failures and the loss of the clan's Edo residence due to fire. In 1824, the domain had the only peasant uprising in its history. He retired in 1840 and died in 1851 at the age of 52. He was married to a daughter of Matsudaira Sadanobu of Shirakawa Domain.

=== Suwa Tadamasa ===
Suwa Tadamasa (諏訪忠誠; June 7, 1821 – February 19, 1898) was the 9th daimyō of Suwa and hereditary chieftain of the Suwa clan.

=== Suwa Tadaaya ===
Suwa Tadaaya (諏訪忠礼; February 20, 1853 – October 10, 1878) was the 10th (and final) daimyō of Suwa and hereditary chieftain of the Suwa clan. Tadaaya was the younger son of Suwa Tadamichi's third son, and was selected by his uncle Suwa Tadamasa as heir. He became daimyō on Tadamasa's retirement in 1868 and was appointed imperial governor by the new Meiji government in 1869. Following the abolition of the han system in 1871, he relocated to Tokyo, where he died in 1878 at the age of 26. The clan chieftainship reverted to Suwa Tadamasa.

== See also ==
List of Han
