= Suwa Tadamasa =

Japanese daimyo (1821–1898)

Suwa Tadamasa 諏訪忠誠
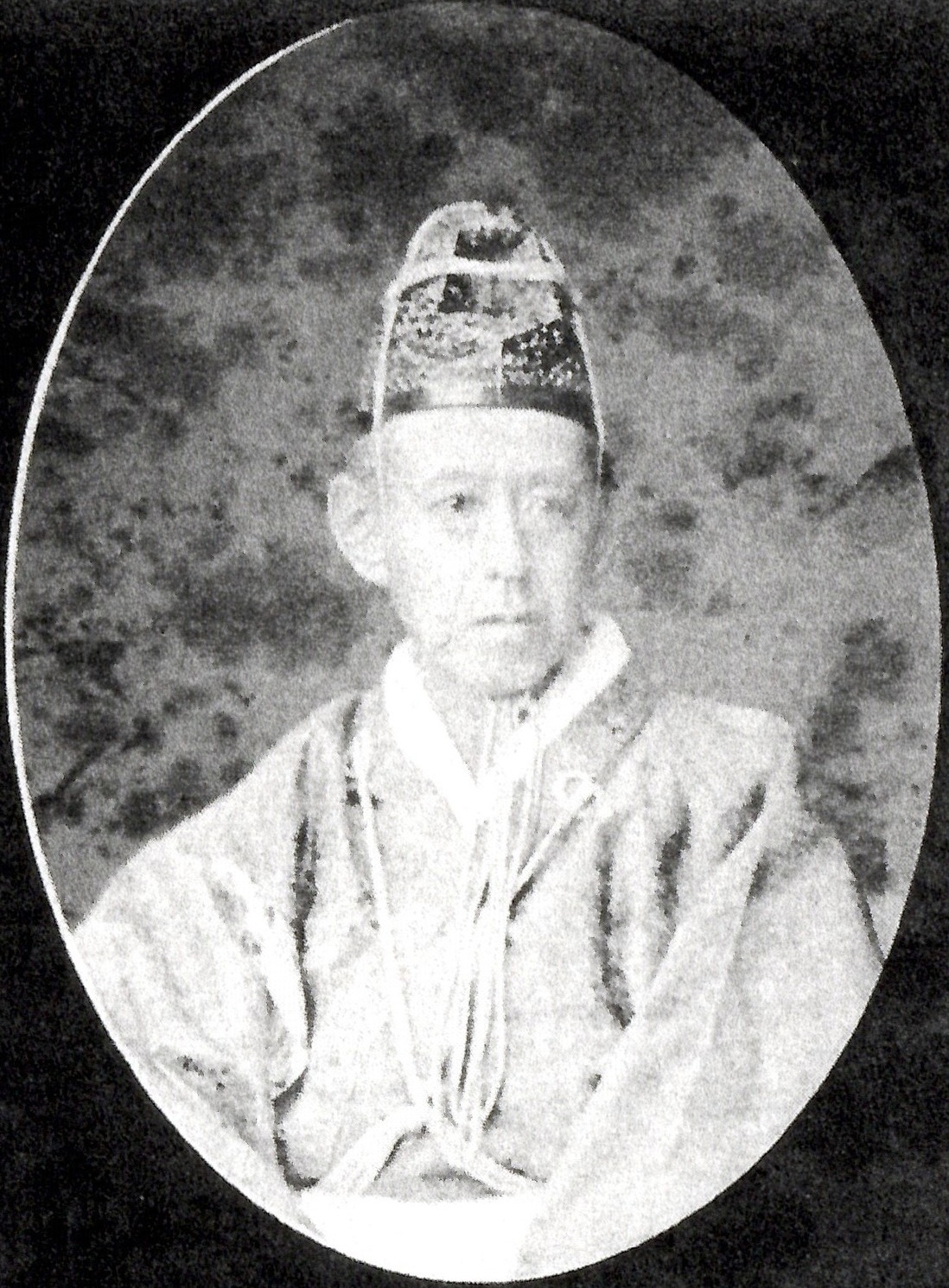
- Born: June 21, 1821
- Died: February 19, 1898 (aged 76)
- Occupation: Daimyō of Suwa Domain (1840-1868)
- Father: Suwa Tadamichi

Suwa Tadamasa (諏訪忠誠; June 7, 1821 – February 19, 1898) was the 9th daimyō of Suwa Domain in Shinano Province, Honshū, Japan (modern-day Nagano Prefecture) and hereditary chieftain of the Suwa clan. His courtesy titles before the Meiji restoration were Inaba-no-kami and Jijū, and his Court rank was Junior Fourth Rank, Lower Grade, which was posthumously raised to Third Rank.

== Biography ==
Suwa Tadamasa was the eldest son of Suwa Tadamichi and became daimyō in 1840 on the retirement of his father. He was strongly supported by his uncle, Matsudaira Sadanobu and rose to the post of wakadoshiyori in 1860, jisha-bugyō in 1862 and rōjū in 1864. As this was during the tumultuous Bakumatsu period, during which time the Tokugawa shogunate was forced to sign treaties with the Western powers to end Japan's self-imposed national isolation policy, Yorimasa played a role in the negotiations. Together with fellow rōjū, Makino Tadayuki of Nagaoka Domain, he strenuously opposed the Second Chōshū expedition, and resigned his posts when the shogunate proceed with the punitive campaign against Chōshū Domain. In 1868, he also retired as daimyō in favor of his nephew, Suwa Tadaaya.

Suwa Domain played no role in the Boshin War, and after the Meiji restoration and the abolition of the han system in 1871, he relocated to Tokyo. From 1874 to 1879, he was appointed kannushi of the Shiba Tōshō-gū, a Shinto Shrine dedicated to the previous Shoguns of the Tokugawa clan in Tokyo. After the death of Suwa Tadaaya in 1878, he resumed his position as chieftain of the Suwa clan. He was reappointed kannushi of the Shiba Tōshō-gū from 1882 to 1889. In 1884 he became a viscount (shisaku) under the kazoku peerage system. His court rank was increased to Senior Fourth Rank in 1887. From 1891 to 1895, he returned to Suwa and became the head kannushi of Suwa Shrine. He then returned to his post at the Shiba Tōshō-gū until his death in 1898.

His wife was a daughter of Matsudaira Norihiro of Nishio Domain and 38th Kyoto Shoshidai. After her death, he remarried to a daughter of Matsudaira Yasutō and 40th Kyoto Shoshidai. His third wife was a daughter of Kutsuki Tsuneeda of Fukuchiyama Domain. His grave is at the Suwa clan temple of Kisshō-ji in Bunkyo, Tokyo.

Preceded by Suwa Tadamichi	9th Daimyo of Suwa; 1840-1868	Succeeded by Suwa Tadaaya
