= Fine Wind, Clear Morning =

Woodblock print by Hokusai

- 凱風快晴 (Gaifū kaisei) (Japanese)
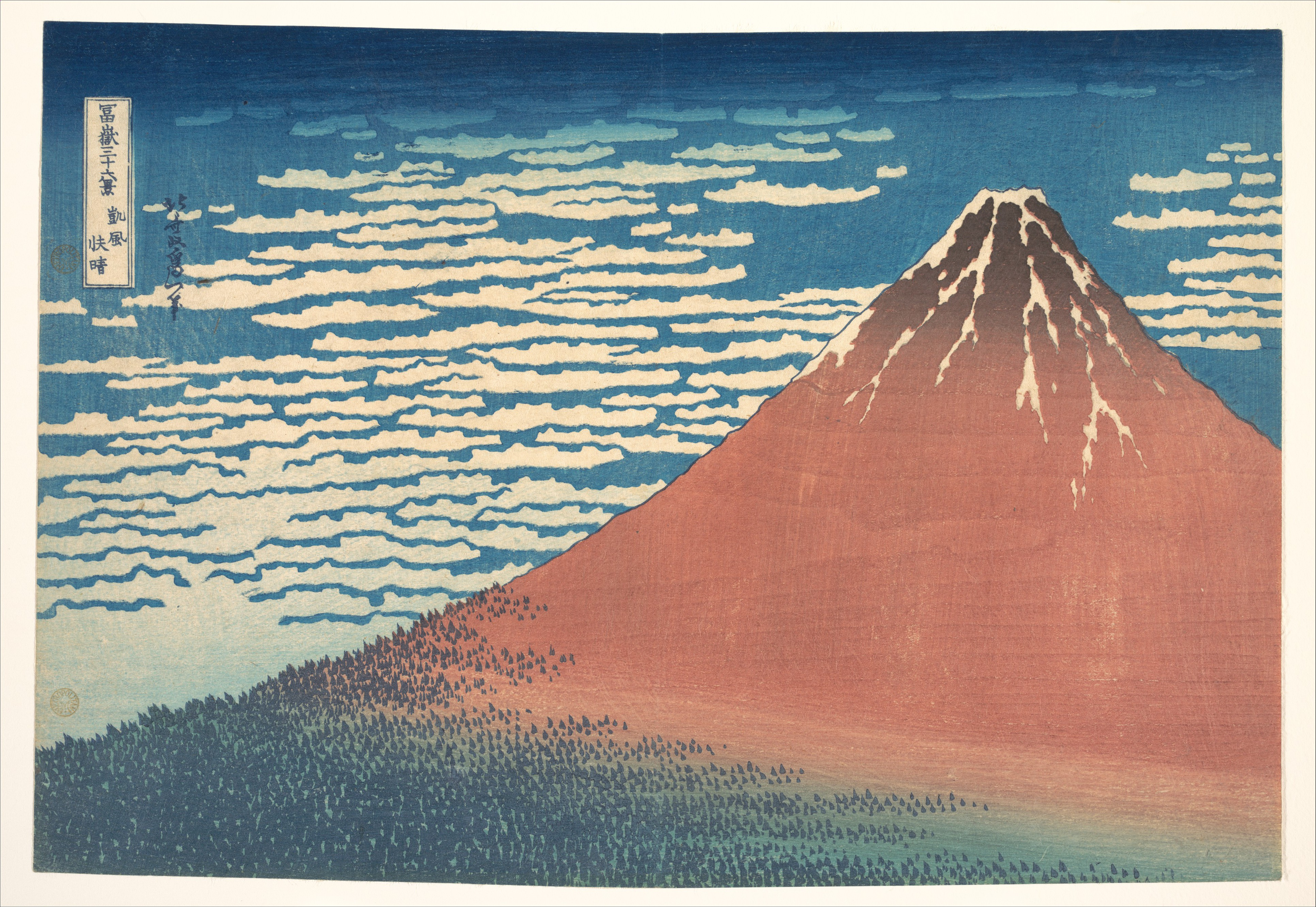
- Artist: Katsushika Hokusai
- Year: c. 1830–1832
- Type: Ukiyo-e woodblock print
- Dimensions: 24.4 cm × 35.6 cm (9.6 in × 14.0 in)

Fine Wind, Clear Morning (Japanese: 凱風快晴, Hepburn: Gaifū kaisei; literally South Wind, Clear Sky) (Note: Also translated as Fine Breezy Day or Clear Day with a Southern Breeze.), also known as Red Fuji (赤富士, Akafuji), is a woodblock print by Japanese artist Hokusai (1760–1849), part of his Thirty-six Views of Mount Fuji series, dating from c. 1830 to 1832. The work has been described as "one of the simplest and at the same time one of the most outstanding of all Japanese prints".

== Description ==
In early autumn when, as the title describes, the wind is southerly and the sky is clear, the rising sun can turn Mount Fuji red. Hokusai captures this moment with compositional abstraction but meteorological specificity, especially when compared to the rest of the series. The three shades of deepening blue of the sky mirror the three hues of the mountain. The lingering remnants of snow at the peak of the mountain and dark shadows encompassing the forest at its base place it very precisely in time. Mount Fuji's solidly symmetrical shape on the right half of the image is balanced by the delicate clouds to the left, for a striking composition.

There is however no specific location name unlike his other works, so the location from where the view was taken is a mystery.

== Impressions ==
The earliest impressions appear faded when compared to the versions usually seen, but are closer to Hokusai's original conception. They are known as Pink Fuji prints and are very rare. The early prints have a deliberately uneven blue sky, which increases the sky's brightness and gives movement to the clouds. The peak is brought forward with a halo of Prussian blue. Subsequent prints have a strong, even blue tone, and the printer added a new block, overprinting the white clouds on the horizon with light blue. Later prints also typically employ a strong benigara (Bengal red) pigment, which has given the painting its common name of Red Fuji. The green block color was re-cut, lowering the meeting point between forest and mountain slope.

An alternative impression of the print was made with a completely different color-scheme. In this version, the clouds are only just visible in the upper portion. The sky is mostly rendered in a flat pale blue with a thin strip of grey at the top, and a graduated strip of Prussian blue along the horizon which extends up the slope of the mountain.

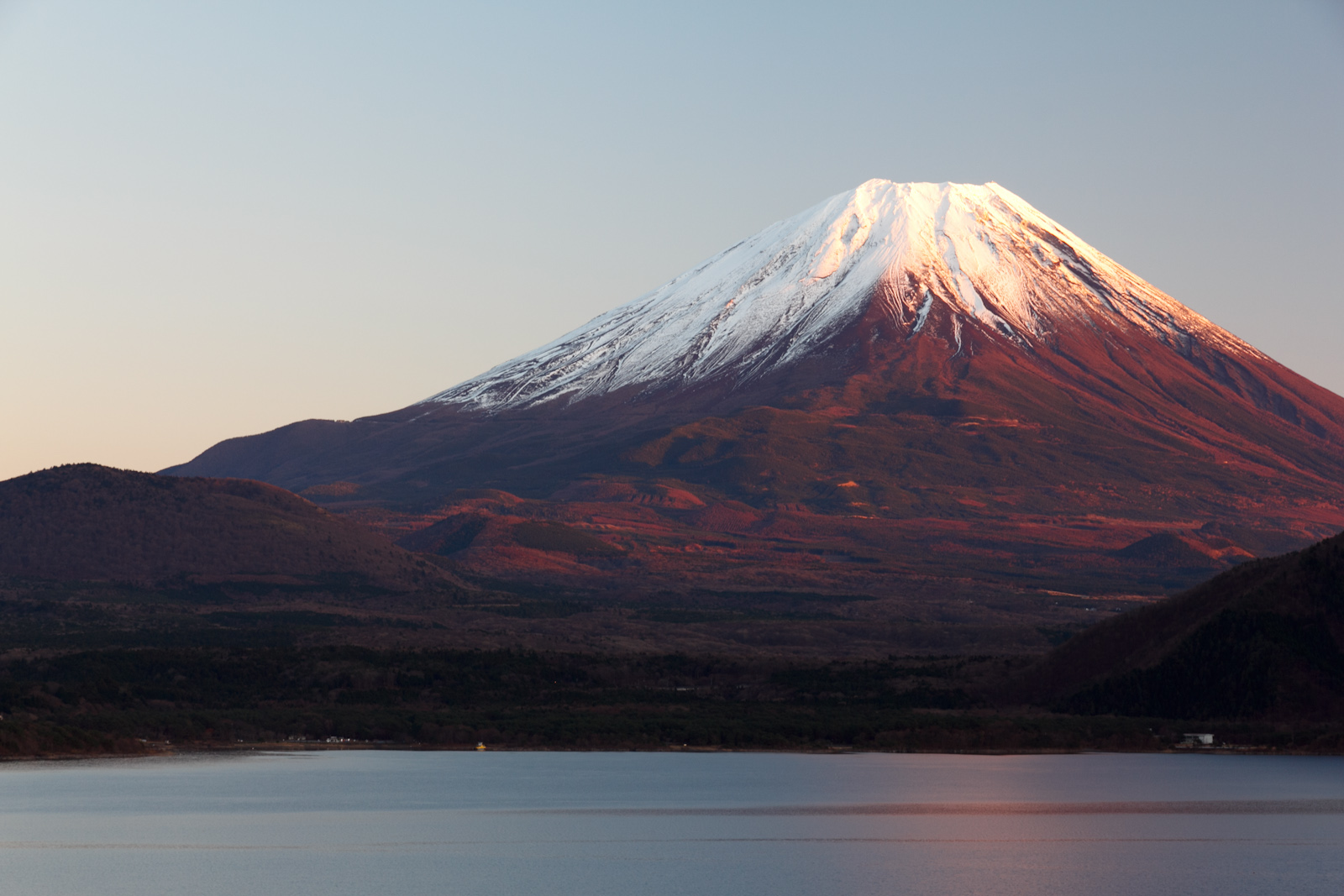
Photograph of Mount Fuji turned red by the rising sun

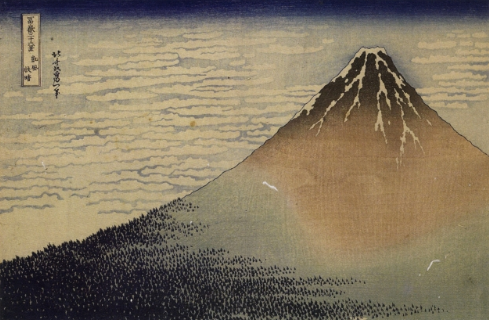
Early impression, sometimes known as Pink Fuji (c. 1830)

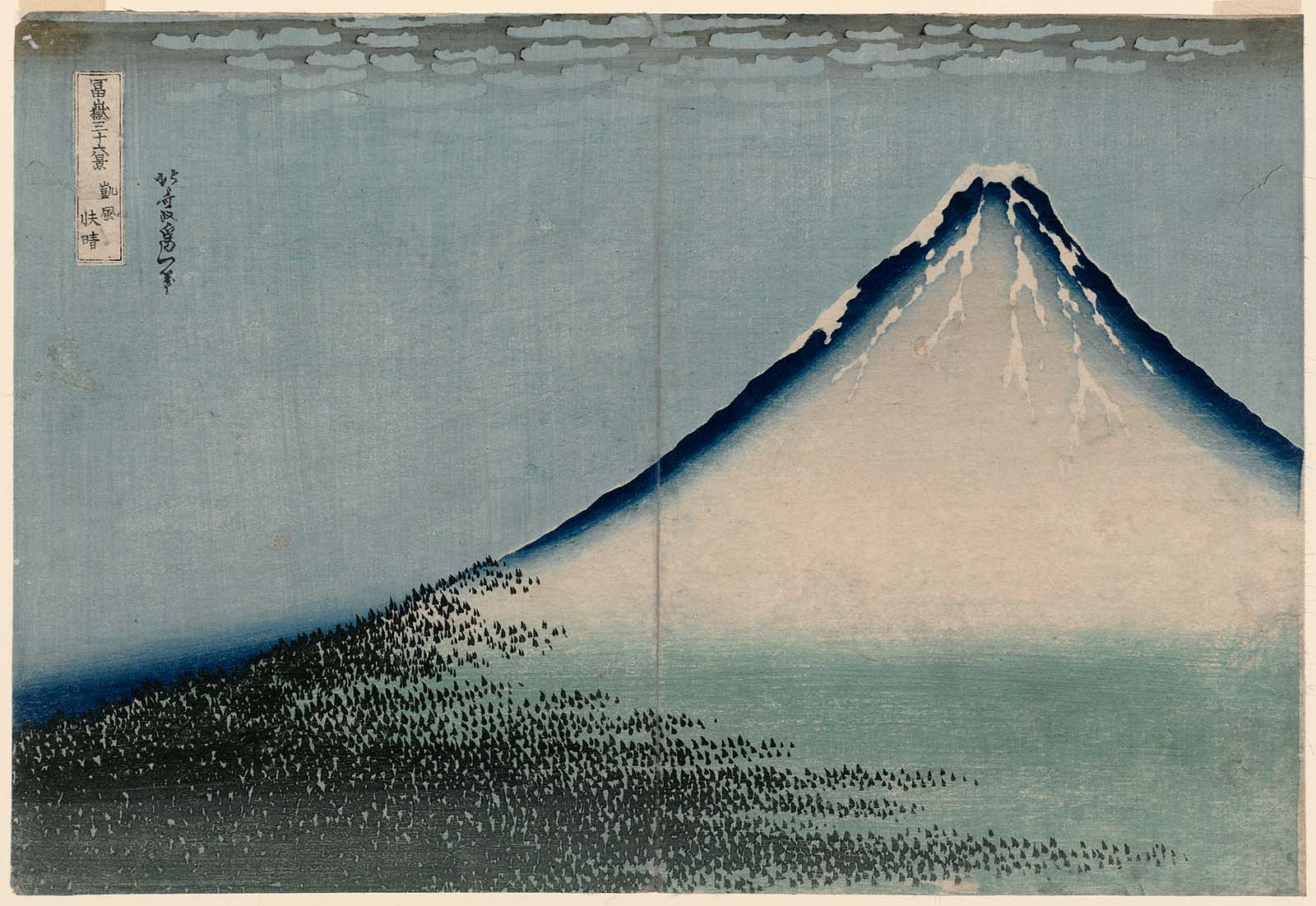
Variant impression (c. 1830)

== Historical information ==
Fine Wind, Clear Morning, along with Hokusai's other prints from his acclaimed Thirty-six Views of Mount Fuji series, in particular The Great Wave off Kanagawa, are perhaps the most widely recognized pieces of Japanese art in the world. Both are superb examples of the Japanese art of ukiyo-e, "pictures of the floating world". Although ukiyo-e can depict anything from contemporary city life to classical literature, and Hokusai's notebooks show that his own interests spanned an equally wide range, it was landscapes like this that earned him his fame. The saturated colors and stylized forms in such prints helped inspire the Impressionist and Post-Impressionist movements decades later. The Red Fuji is more highly esteemed and appreciated in Japan than the Great Wave, which is more well-known abroad, and it inspired Akira Kurosawa's Mount Fuji in Red.

Prints can be found in museums worldwide including the British Museum, the Metropolitan Museum of Art, the Museum of Fine Arts, Boston, and the Indianapolis Museum of Art.

In March 2019, a print of Fine Wind, Clear Morning was sold for $507,000 at an auction in New York.
