= Lake Suwa =

Lake in Nagano prefecture, Japan

- 諏訪湖 (Japanese); suwa-ko (Japanese)
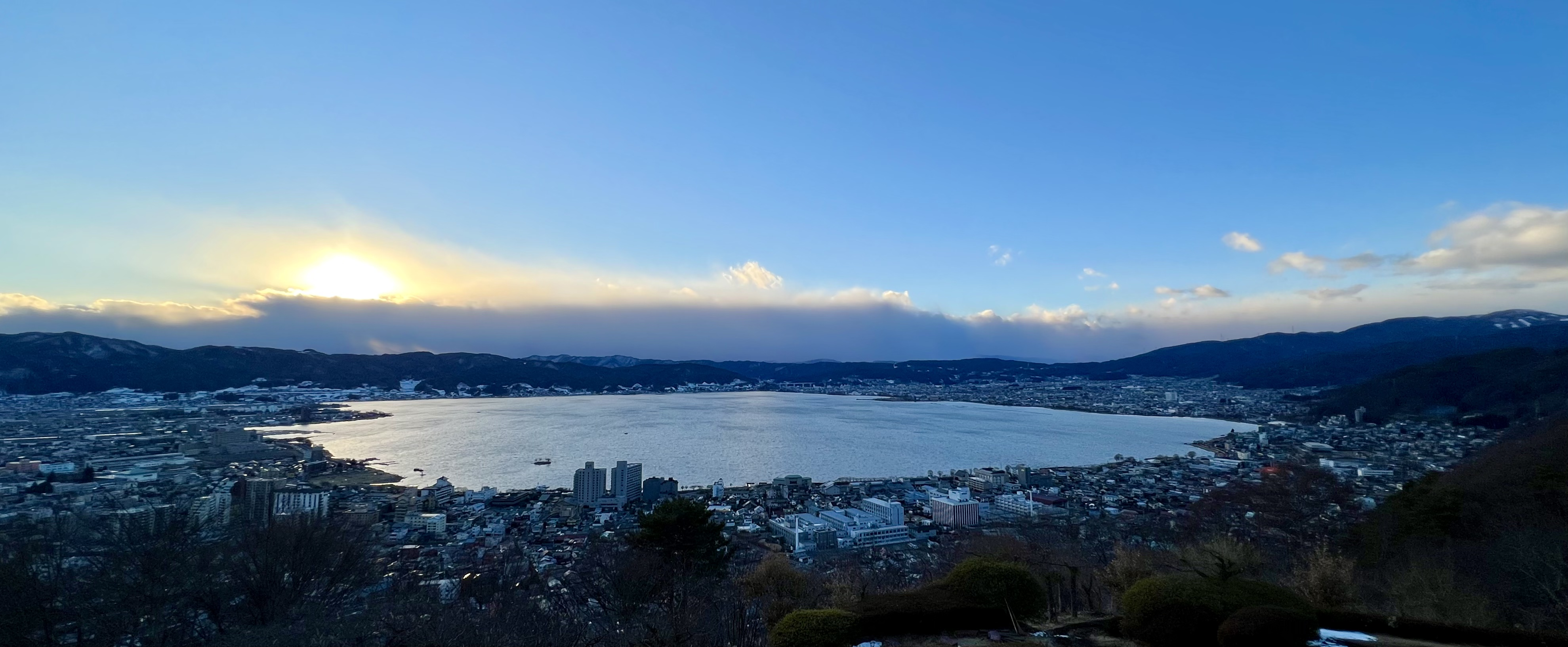

- Location in Japan Lake Suwa (Nagano Prefecture)
- Location: Nagano prefecture
- Coordinates: 36°02′54″N 138°05′03″E
- Primary inflows: 31 small rivers of the Kiso Mountains
- Primary outflows: Tenryū River
- Basin countries: Japan
- Surface area: 13.3 km^{2} (5.1 sq mi)
- Average depth: 4.7 m (15 ft)
- Max. depth: 7.2 m (24 ft)
- Shore length^{1}: 15.9 km (9.9 mi)
- Surface elevation: 759 m (2,490 ft)
- Settlements: Okaya, Suwa, Shimosuwa
- ^{1} Shore length is not a well-defined measure.

Lake Suwa (諏訪湖, Suwa-ko) is a lake in the Kiso Mountains, in the central region of Nagano Prefecture, Japan.

== Geography ==
Lake Suwa is the source of the Tenryū River. It ranks 24th in lake water surface area in Japan. The cities of Suwa and Okaya and the town of Shimosuwa are located on the shores of Lake Suwa.

=== Miwatari ===
Lake Suwa is the site of a natural phenomenon known as the miwatari, in recent years with an "o" added to the beginning, meaning "God's Crossing" (御神渡り, o-miwatari), large cracks that form in the winter across the surface of the frozen lake. A vertical temperature gradient results in ice pressure ridges forming in the surface ice, reaching heights of 30 centimetres (1 ft) or more, although much greater heights were recorded in the past.

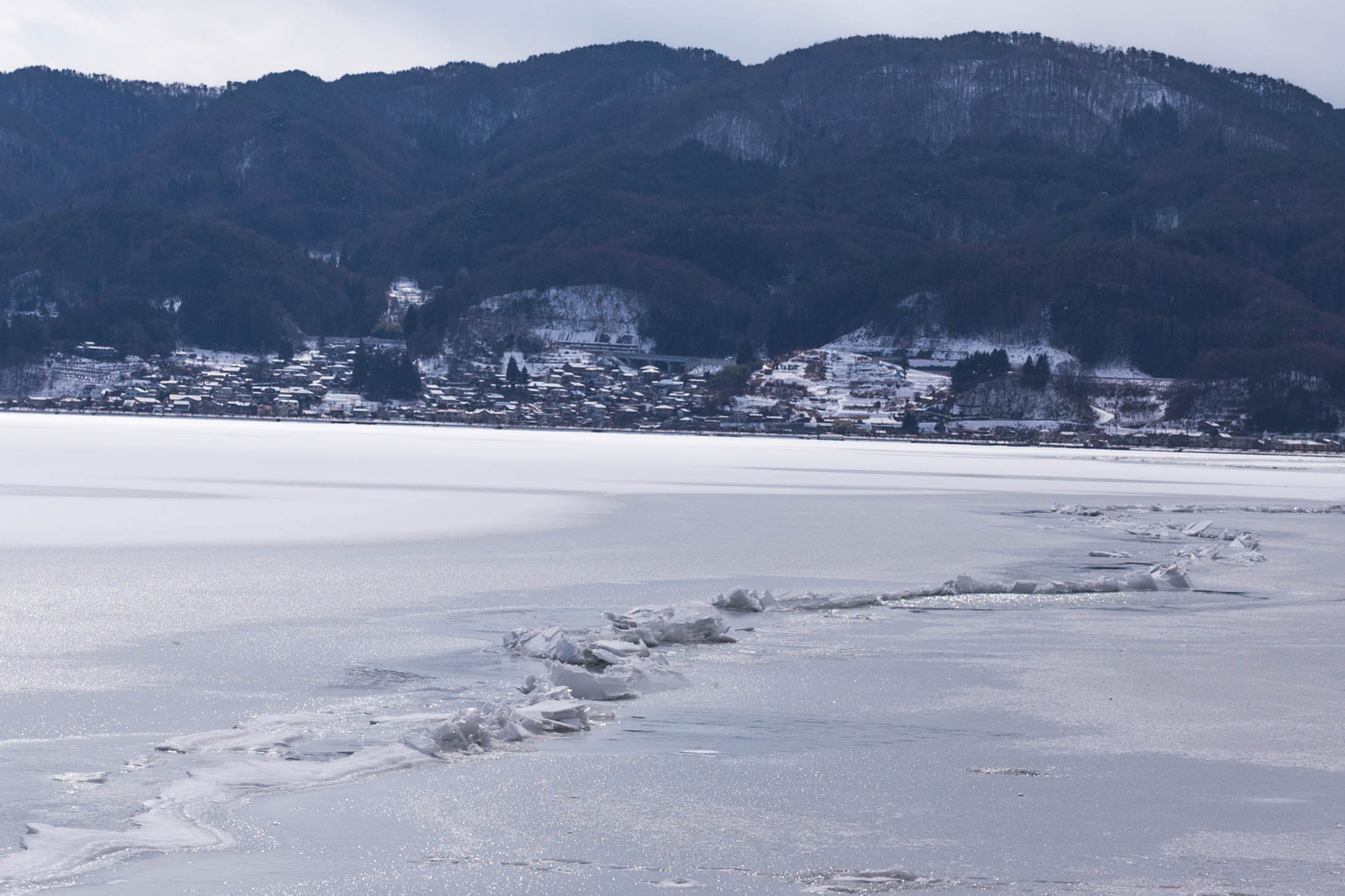
Omiwatari in 2018

Local Shinto tradition holds that the ridges are formed by the gods crossing the lake when traveling between the various buildings of the Suwa Grand Shrine. Folklore says it is the guardian god of Suwa, Takeminakata-no-kami, leaving his sanctuary to meet with his wife, the goddess Yasakatome, joining the opposite bank by walking on frozen water. The record of this crossing is the oldest-known human-observed climate record. This record has been used by scientists to study the impact of sunspots, human development and anthropogenic CO_{2} emissions on lake ice formation.

The lake has a natural hot spring under its surface. Recreational development in the 1950s resulted in increased output from this underwater geyser. Since 1945, complete ice cover is considered to be achieved when the entire surface is frozen except for the opening in the ice for the geyser.

As a shallow lake, Lake Suwa is highly sensitive to climatic variation. Recent studies have shown that Suwa's ice-free years correlate to increasing atmospheric CO_{2} levels. Research on ice breakup at Suwa and at the mouth of the Torne River in Finland suggest that climate change is driving the changes in seasonal ice cover. As a result, Lake Suwa may remain ice-free for almost the entirety of the 21st century's winters.

As of 2025, the last time Lake Suwa had developed the miwatari was 2018, and the ridge that developed was only a few inches high. Records of the appearance of the miwatari date to 1443; a gap of seven years was last recorded in the 16th century. During the 17th century, it only failed to appear twice. As of 2025 the lake had failed to freeze over in 18 of the past 25 years and has failed to freeze over regularly since the 1980s.

== Cultural history ==
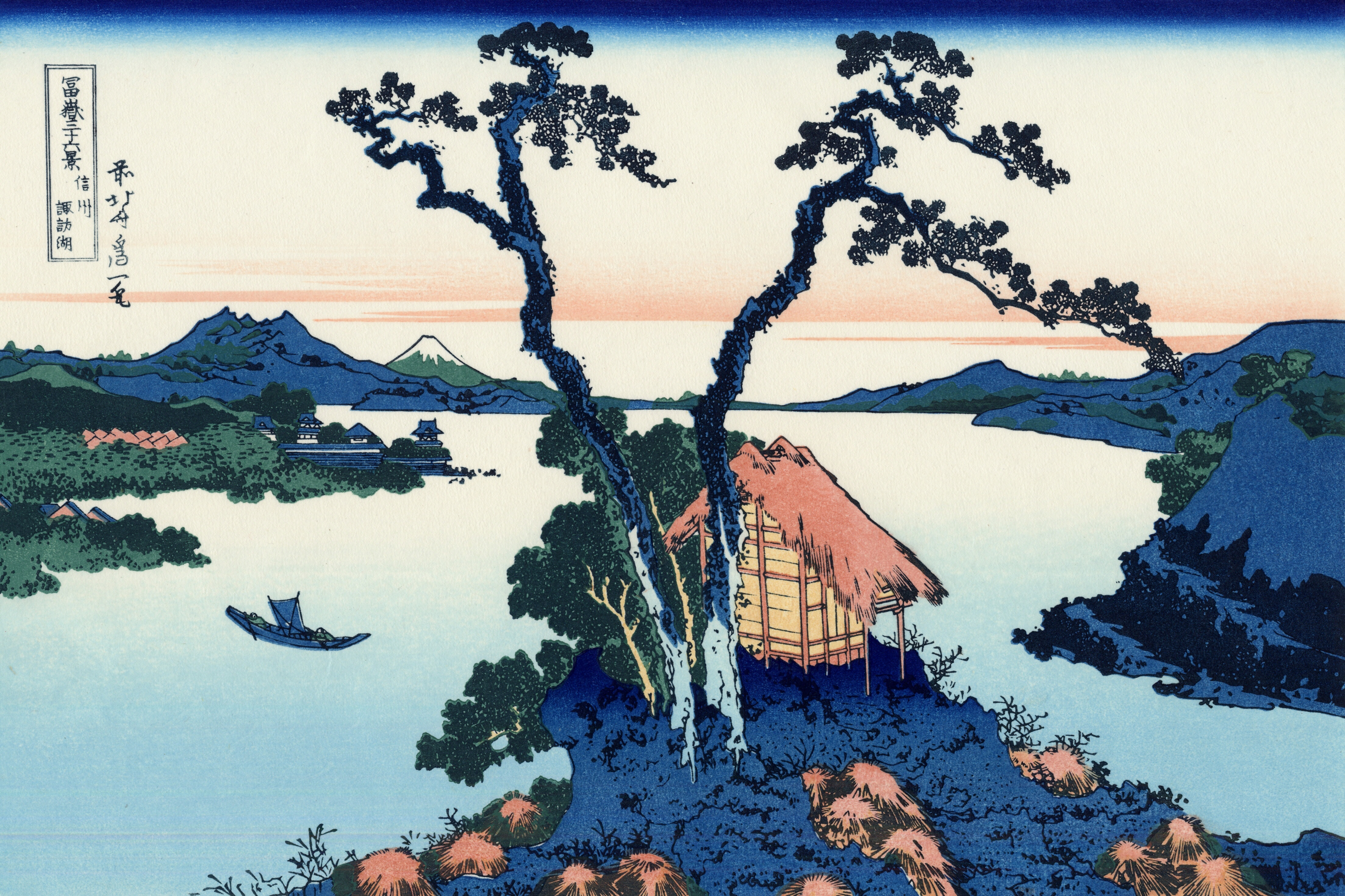
A View of Mount Fuji Across Lake Suwa (Shinshū Suwako), from the series Thirty-six Views of Mount Fuji (Fugaku sanjūrokkei) ca. 1830–32

Lake Suwa hosts two major shrines, the Tenaga Jinja and Suwa-taisha. Major festivals include the Onbashira and Setsubun.

Hokusai included Lake Suwa in his famous Thirty-six Views of Mount Fuji (Fugaku sanjūrokkei) series of woodblock prints.

Epson, a global technology company, was founded and is headquartered in Suwa.

== Water sports ==
In 2020, in advance of the scheduled Tokyo 2020 Summer Olympics, a new rowing boathouse and training facility was established in Shimosuwa.

== See also ==
- List of lakes in Japan
- Onbashira
